= Woodhaven Boulevard station (IND Queens Boulevard Line) =

New York City Subway station in Queens

Woodhaven Blvd
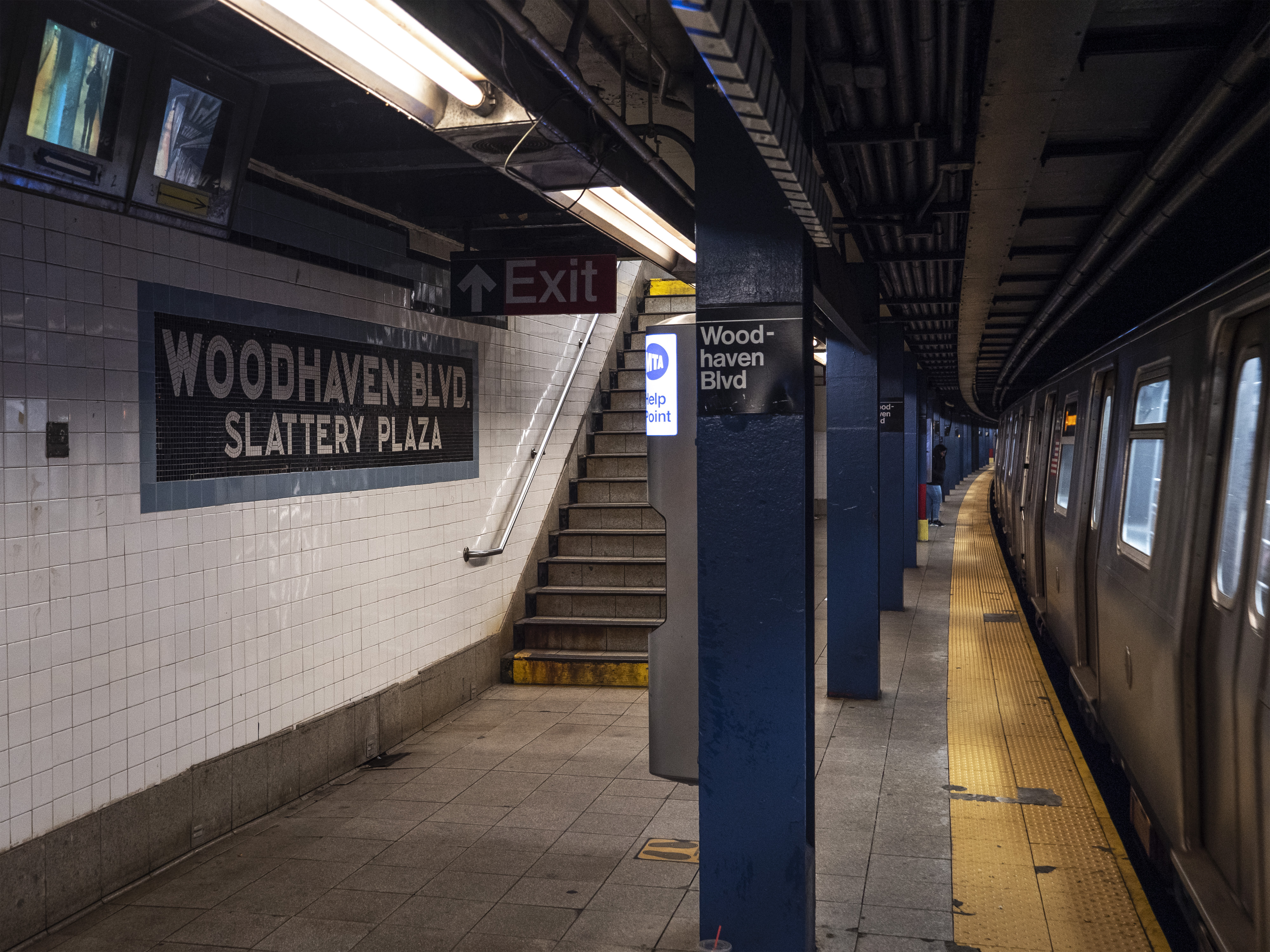
- Southbound platform with an R160 R train at the station

Station statistics
- Address: Woodhaven Boulevard & Queens Boulevard; Elmhurst, New York
- Borough: Queens
- Locale: Elmhurst
- Coordinates: 40.73347°N 73.870397°W
- Division: B (IND)
- Line: IND Queens Boulevard Line
- Services: E (late nights); F (late nights); M (weekdays during the day); R (all times except late nights)
- Transit: NYCT Bus: Q14, Q29, Q59, Q88, Q98; MTA Bus: Q11, Q52/Q53 SBS, Q60, QM10, QM11, QM12, QM40, QM42
- Structure: Underground
- Platforms: 2 side platforms
- Tracks: 4

Other information
- Opened: December 31, 1936; 89 years ago
- Accessible: No; under construction
- Former/other names: Woodhaven Boulevard–Slattery Plaza; Woodhaven Boulevard–Queens Mall

Traffic
- 2025: 4,227,526 ▲6.2%
- Rank: 69 out of 423
Services
Preceding station	New York City Subway	Following station
Grand Avenue–Newtown E F M R via 36th Street	Local	63rd Drive–Rego Park E F M R toward Forest Hills–71st Avenue
does not stop here
Location
Location within New York City Subway
Location within New York City
Location within New York
Track layout
Street map
Station service legend
Symbol	Description
Stops all times except late nights	Stops all times except late nights
Stops late nights only	Stops late nights only
Stops weekdays during the day	Stops weekdays during the day

The Woodhaven Boulevard station is a local station on the IND Queens Boulevard Line of the New York City Subway, consisting of four tracks. Located in Elmhurst, Queens, it is served by the M train on weekdays, and by the R train at all times except late nights, when the E and F trains take over service. The station serves the adjacent Queens Center Mall, as well as numerous bus lines.

Woodhaven Boulevard was opened on December 31, 1936, as Woodhaven Boulevard–Slattery Plaza. At the time, the station was part of the Independent Subway System. The plaza was demolished in the 1950s, but the name tablets displaying the station's original name were kept. In the 1980s, the Woodhaven Boulevard station was renamed after Queens Center, an adjacent shopping mall. The station was renovated in the 1990s.

== History ==
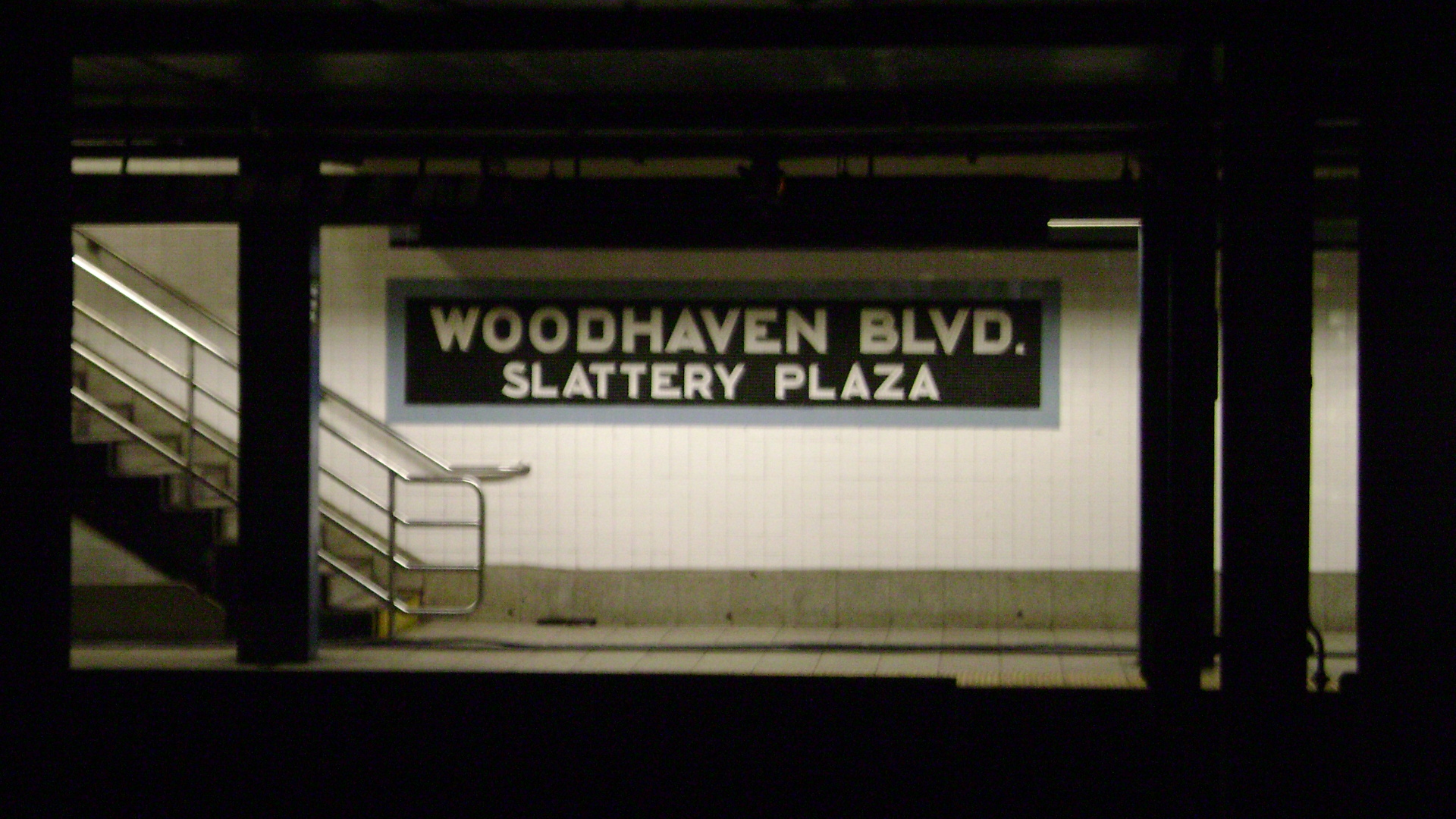
Mosaic name tablet

=== Construction and opening ===
The Queens Boulevard Line was one of the first built by the city-owned Independent Subway System (IND), and was planned to stretch between the IND Eighth Avenue Line in Manhattan and 178th Street and Hillside Avenue in Jamaica, Queens, with a stop at Woodhaven Boulevard. The line was first proposed in 1925. Construction of the line was approved by the New York City Board of Estimate on October 4, 1928. The line was constructed using the cut-and-cover tunneling method, and to allow pedestrians to cross, temporary bridges were built over the trenches.

The first section of the line opened on August 19, 1933 from the connection to the Eighth Avenue Line at 50th Street to Roosevelt Avenue in Jackson Heights. Later that year, a $23 million loan was approved to finance the remainder of the line, along with other IND lines. The remainder of the line was built by the Public Works Administration. In 1934 and 1935, construction of the extension to Jamaica was suspended for 15 months and was halted by strikes. Construction was further delayed due to a strike in 1935, instigated by electricians opposing wages paid by the General Railway Signal Company. By August 1935, work had resumed on the Woodhaven Boulevard station and three other stations on the Queens Boulevard Line.

During the station's construction, the main road of Queens Boulevard was depressed into underpasses at the intersections with Woodhaven Boulevard and Horace Harding Boulevard (also known as Nassau Boulevard). The easternmost underpass now carries Queens Boulevard below the Long Island Expressway (LIE), which replaced Horace Harding Boulevard.

In August 1936, tracks were installed all the way to 178th Street, and the stations to Union Turnpike were completed. On December 31, 1936, the IND Queens Boulevard Line was extended by eight stops, and 3.5 miles (5.6 km), from its previous terminus at Roosevelt Avenue to Union Turnpike. As a result of the extension, areas in Elmhurst were accessible by subway. The E train, which initially served all stops on the new extension, began making express stops in April 1937, and local GG trains began serving the extension at the time.

=== Later years ===
The station was originally named "Woodhaven Blvd–Slattery Plaza", after Slattery Plaza, the area where four main Queens thoroughfares (Eliot Avenue and Horace Harding, Woodhaven, and Queens Boulevards) intersected. The plaza, which no longer exists, featured several "mom-and-pop" small businesses. The plaza and subway station were named after Colonel John R. Slattery, former New York City Board of Transportation chief engineer who died in 1932 while supervising the construction of the IND Eighth Avenue Line. The construction of the LIE along the Horace Harding corridor in the 1950s resulted in the demolition of Slattery Plaza, although the name tablets retained the original name even after the plaza's demolition. (Note: For more information on the current tablets that state "Woodhaven Blvd–Slattery Plaza", see the following sources: Schneider 2000.; Karni, Annie (October 7, 2012). "Subway stations retain signs listing places and streets that no longer exist". nypost.com. New York Post.; Walsh, Kevin (July 29, 2014). "Ely Around in Queens". queens.brownstoner.com. Blank Slate Factory, Inc.)

==== Renovation ====
Queens Center Mall first opened in 1973, but the name convention on subway maps was not in use until the mid-to-late 1980s. (Note: According to scans of 1980s subway maps: "1983 Subway Map". New York City Transit Authority. 1983. Archived from the original on September 18, 2016. "Woodhaven Blvd–Slattery Plaza"; "1987 Subway Map". New York City Transit Authority. 1987. Archived from the original on September 18, 2016. "Woodhaven Blvd–Queens Center") The station became dilapidated by the 1980s due to lack of maintenance over the years, and in 1981, the Metropolitan Transportation Authority (MTA) listed the station among the 69 most deteriorated stations in the subway system. The station was also heavily used, serving 15,000 passengers per weekday by 1993.

In April 1991, the entrance at the north side of Queens Boulevard near an overpass of the Long Island Expressway was closed, along with fifteen other entrances across the subway system to reduce crime. In June 1992, subway riders held a protest rally, demanding the reopening of the entrance. In 1993, the Woodhaven Boulevard station began a three-year renovation project as part of a general refurbishment of seventy New York City Subway stations. The refurbishment added a new token booth, new signage and platform edge strips, replaced platform tiles, staircase components, and lighting, and restored the station's restrooms. Four new turnstiles were added at the east end of the station, a new east-end staircase was added to the north side of Queens Boulevard and the west-end staircase was widened. A new public address system was added to the station, the west end token booth was moved closer to the turnstiles and turnstiles equipped for the Automated Fare Collection system were installed. The project was expected to be completed in September 1996. After the renovation, the station retained the now out-of-date "Woodhaven Blvd–Slattery Plaza" name tablets.

In 2019, as part of an initiative to increase the accessibility of the New York City Subway system, the MTA announced that it would install elevators at the Woodhaven Boulevard station as part of the MTA's 2020–2024 Capital Program. In November 2022, the MTA announced that it would award a $965 million contract for the installation of 21 elevators across eight stations, including Woodhaven Boulevard. A joint venture of ASTM and Halmar International would construct the elevators under a public-private partnership. The station is currently undergoing renovations to install elevators at the station.

== Station layout ==
There are four tracks and two side platforms; the two center express tracks are used by the E and F trains at all times except late nights. The E and F trains serve the station at night, the M train serves the station on weekdays during the day, and the R train serves the station at all times except late nights. The station is between Grand Avenue–Newtown to the west and 63rd Drive–Rego Park to the east.

Fixed platform barriers, which are intended to prevent commuters falling to the tracks, are positioned near the platform edges. At either end of both platforms are bellmouth provisions to allow conversion into an express station. The tunnel wall extends outward to allow space for the two side platforms to be replaced with island platforms, and for the local tracks to be relocated outside the island platforms. The station would have accommodated a major system expansion, with additional service coming from the Roosevelt Avenue Terminal station and the former LIRR Rockaway Line. Requests to convert the station were also put forward by the local community shortly after the station opened, due to heavy bus traffic feeding into the station and overcrowding at the Roosevelt Avenue express stop.

The name tablets on this station still retain the original name of Woodhaven Boulevard–Slattery Plaza. The tilework in this station consists of blue tile bands with a black border, similar to the tilework found at the Elmhurst Avenue stop, two stations west. The tile band was part of a color-coded tile system used throughout the IND. The tile colors were designed to facilitate navigation for travelers going away from Lower Manhattan. As such, the blue tiles used at the Woodhaven Boulevard station are also used at Jackson Heights–Roosevelt Avenue, the next express station to the west, while a different tile color is used at Forest Hills–71st Avenue, the next express station to the east. Blue tiles are similarly used at the other local stations between Roosevelt Avenue and 71st Avenue. Near the edges of the platforms, I-beam piers are located every 15 feet (4.6 m) and support girders above the platforms. The roof girders are also connected to columns in the walls adjoining each platform.

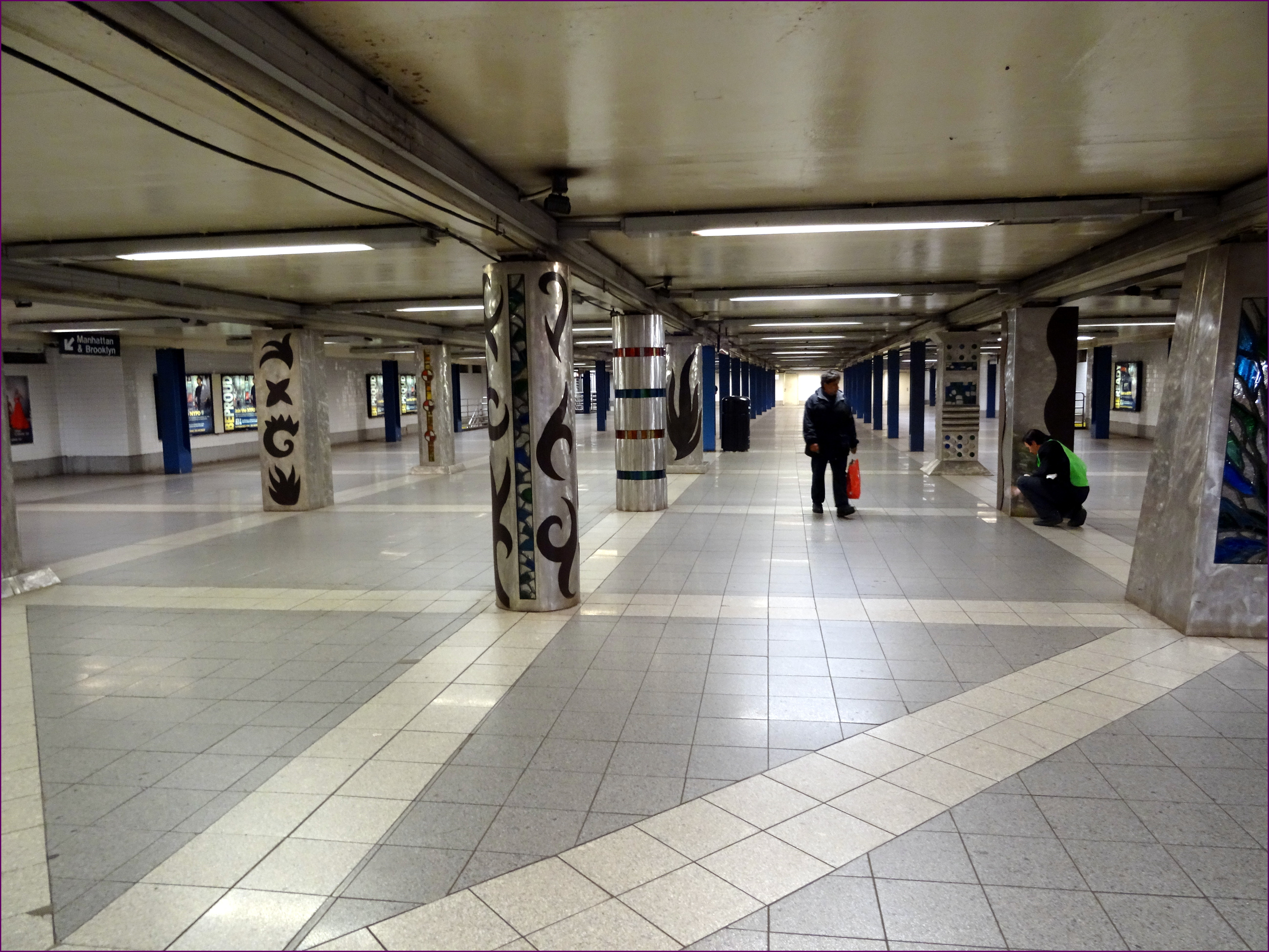
Mezzanine, with In Memory of The Lost Battalion artwork

The station's full-length mezzanine allows crossover from any of the station's four staircases from each platform, with a total of eight staircases from the mezzanine to platform level. There is no direct indoor access to the Queens Center Mall's entrance at the northwest corner of Queens Boulevard and 59th Avenue from the mezzanine. The 1996 artwork here is called In Memory of The Lost Battalion by Pablo Tauler. It uses nine support beams in the station's mezzanine wrapped in different materials— including glass, iron, and stainless steel—to honor the soldiers who served in the 77th Infantry Division during World War I.

The tunnel is covered by a U-shaped trough that contains utility pipes and wires. The outer walls of this trough are composed of columns, spaced approximately every 5 feet (1.5 m) with concrete infill between them. There is a 1-inch (25 mm) gap between the tunnel wall and the platform wall, which is made of 4-inch (100 mm)-thick brick covered over by a tiled finish. The columns between the tracks are also spaced every 5 feet (1.5 m), with no infill.

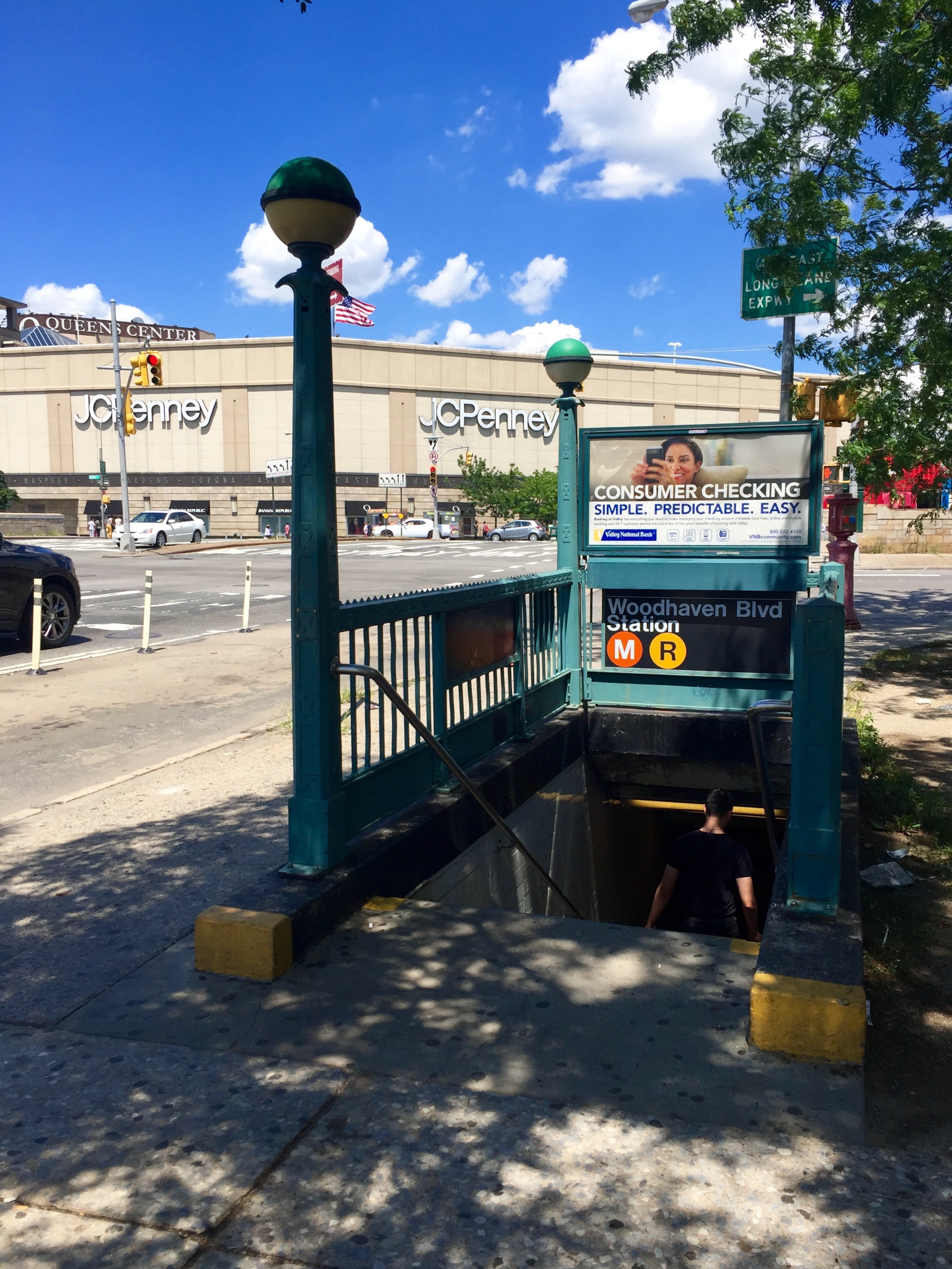
One of the "orphaned" station entrances, at the southeast corner of Woodhaven Boulevard and Queens Boulevard

=== Exits ===
The full-time side at the west end of the mezzanine has three street stairs. One leads to the northeast corner of Queens Boulevard and 59th Avenue, the closest to the mall. The other two staircases are through a long passageway to both southern corners of Queens Boulevard and Woodhaven Boulevard, acting as a pedestrian underpass outside of fare control. These staircases date back to the station's original opening. There is an entrance to the southeast corner of Woodhaven and Queens Boulevards that, as a result of the construction of the Long Island Expressway in the mid-1950s, leads only to a sidewalk isolated between two entrance ramps to the expressway, requiring passengers to cross traffic signals on all sides.

The part-time portion at the former Horace Harding Boulevard on the east end has a closed and removed booth and one street stair to the north side of Queens Boulevard at 92nd Street. This entrance abuts two expressway ramps and leads to the former Horace Harding Boulevard, now replaced by the LIE exit ramp. This exit still has a directional mosaic pointing to it, listing the exit as 60th Avenue and 92nd Street on the north side of Queens Boulevard. The construction of the Long Island Expressway removed this intersection. This is also a staircase that dates to the station's opening.

There is a closed exit to the south side of Queens Boulevard underneath the Long Island Expressway, between the ramp to the eastbound expressway and Eliot Avenue. It is covered with a trapdoor.

== Bus service ==
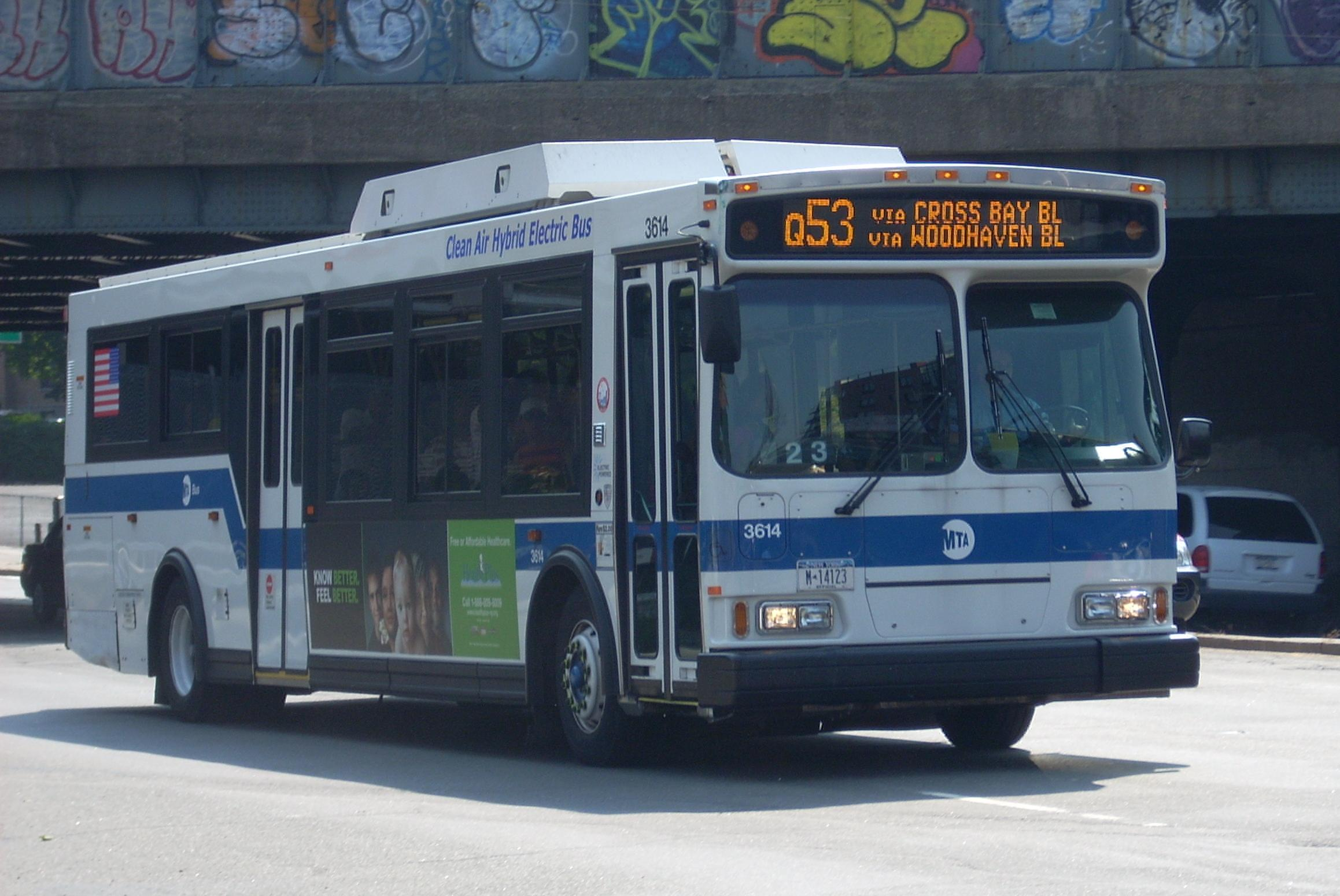
Q53 Limited Bus via Woodhaven and Cross Bay Boulevards prior to its 2017 conversion to a Select Bus Service route

The station and the nearby Queens Center Mall are served by nine local MTA Regional Bus Operations routes and three express bus routes. Two of the three Woodhaven Boulevard bus lines (Q11 and Q52 SBS) terminate at the station, with the Q53 SBS bus continuing westward towards the Woodside – 61st Street Station. Except for the Q88, Rego Park-bound Q59, South Jamaica-bound Q60, Flushing-bound Q98, and East Elmhurst-bound Q14, all northbound buses stop at the mall entrance, while all southbound buses as well as the QM10, QM40, and QM11 express buses stop at Hoffman Drive adjacent to Hoffman Park. The Q88 terminates at 92nd Street, in between the two halves of the mall.

Route	Stop location	North/West Terminal	South/East Terminal	via	notes
Local Bus Routes
Q11	Queens Boulevard (northbound); Hoffman Drive (southbound)	Woodhaven Boulevard	Old Howard Beach or Hamilton Beach	Woodhaven and Cross Bay Boulevards	
Q14	59th Avenue; Hoffman Drive	Ridgewood (Forest Avenue Station)	East Elmhurst	Forest Avenue, Eliot Avenue, 57th/59th Avenues, 99th Street, 102nd/103rd/104th Streets	
Q29	Queens Boulevard (northbound); Hoffman Drive (southbound)	Jackson Heights (82nd Street Station)	Glendale (81st Street and Myrtle Avenue)	90th/92nd Streets, Dry Harbor Road, 80th Street	Some AM rush northbound service terminates here.
Q52	Queens Boulevard (northbound); Hoffman Drive (southbound)	Woodhaven Boulevard	Edgemere	Q53 trips: Broadway and Queens Boulevard; All trips: Woodhaven and Cross Bay Boulevards, Rockaway Beach Boulevard	Select Bus Service
Q53	Queens Boulevard (northbound); Hoffman Drive (southbound)	Woodside (61st Street Station)	Rockaway Park (Beach 116th Street Station)	Q53 trips: Broadway and Queens Boulevard; All trips: Woodhaven and Cross Bay Boulevards, Rockaway Beach Boulevard	Select Bus Service
Q59	Queens Boulevard	Williamsburg, Brooklyn	Rego Park (63rd Drive Station)	Grand Street and Grand Avenue, Queens Boulevard	
Q60	Queens Boulevard	East Midtown, Manhattan	South Jamaica	Queensboro Bridge, Queens Boulevard, Sutphin Boulevard	
Q88	92nd Street and 59th Avenue	92nd Street	Queens Village (Queens Village LIRR Station)	Horace Harding Expressway, 188th Street, 73rd Avenue, Springfield Boulevard	
Q98	Queens Boulevard	Ridgewood Intermodal Terminal	Flushing	Fresh Pond Road, Grand Avenue, Queens Boulevard, Horace Harding Expressway, College Point Boulevard	
Express Bus Routes
QM10 and QM40	Woodhaven Boulevard (near Hoffman Drive)	Midtown Manhattan	Rego Park / Elmhurst Loop (Drop-off Only)	3rd Avenue (QM40) or 6th Avenue (QM10)	
QM11	Woodhaven Boulevard (near Hoffman Drive)	Downtown Manhattan	Rego Park / Elmhurst Loop (Drop-off Only)	Downtown Loop	
