= Mercaz HaTorah of Belle Harbor =

Talmudical school in New York

Yeshiva Mercaz HaTorah of Belle Harbor
- Hebrew: ישיבה מרכז התורה דבעל הארבר

Location
- Belle Harbor, Queens, New York; United States
- Coordinates: 40.57982°N 73.85043°W

Information
- Type: Private Talmudical high school
- Religious affiliation: Jewish
- Denomination: Orthodox Jewish
- Superintendent: Rabbi Goldstein
- Dean: Rabbi Shmuel Zev Dicker
- Website: www.ymhbh.com

Yeshiva Mercaz HaTorah of Belle Harbor (known colloquially in yeshiva circles as "Belle Harbor") is a residential high school and 3 year post high school for men founded in 1985 by Rabbi Chaim Zelikovitz and Rabbi Levi Dicker. It was led by Rabbi Levi Dicker for most of its history, until his passing in 2011. Rabbi Shmuel Zev Dicker is the current Rosh HaYeshiva.

Rabbi Levi Dicker was a close student of Rabbi Aharon Kotler, founder of Beth Medrash Govoha in Lakewood Township, New Jersey, and the yeshiva follows a similar approach to life and learning. The Yeshiva is located at 505 Beach 129th Street in Rockaway Park, Queens, on the Rockaway Peninsula. It offers a dual curriculum program for high school students, with a secular program offered in the afternoon, and Torah studies for the remainder of the day. The post high school program is a full-time program in Torah studies. The post high school program is in the process of being approved as a college and will give bachelor-equivalent degrees in Talmudic studies.

In 2012, after Hurricane Sandy flooded Belle Harbor and the yeshiva campus, the Yeshiva temporarily relocated to Staten Island while the school facilities were pumped and repaired. The Yeshiva is known for its charity, generosity and resilience in the wake of the crash of American Airlines Flight 587, which crashed on multiple sides of the Yeshiva.
