= Belle Harbor, Queens =

Neighborhood in New York City

Belle Harbor
- Neighborhood of Queens
- Interactive map of Belle Harbor
- Coordinates: 40.575°N 73.85°W
- Country: United States
- State: New York
- City: New York City
- County/Borough: Queens
- Community District: Queens 14
- Time zone: UTC−5 (EST)
  - Summer (DST): UTC−4 (EDT)
- ZIP Code: 11694
- Area codes: 718, 347, 929, and 917

Belle Harbor is a small residential neighborhood in the New York City borough of Queens, located on the western half of the Rockaway Peninsula, the southernmost area of the borough. Belle Harbor commonly refers to the area from Beach 126th to Beach 141st Streets.

The neighborhood is part of Queens Community Board 14. According to the 2010 United States census, the neighborhood, coupled with nearby Neponsit, had a population just over 5,400. Belle Harbor was the site of the 2001 crash of American Airlines Flight 587, which killed 265 people.

== History ==
=== Development ===
The opening of passenger railroad service in 1880 to Rockaway Park from Long Island City and from Flatbush Terminal (now Atlantic Terminal) in downtown Brooklyn, via the Long Island Rail Road's Rockaway Beach Branch, facilitated population growth on the Rockaways Peninsula.

The makings of Belle Harbor began in 1900, when a New York State judge ordered that the land west of Rockaway Park be put up for auction. The area that makes up Belle Harbor and the neighboring community of Neponsit was bought by Edward P. Hatch, who, after a couple years, sold it to the West Rockaway Land Company in 1907. Residential lots in Belle Harbor were auctioned off in 1915. The president of the company, Frederick J. Lancaster, who had earlier developed the Edgemere neighborhood, officially gave the community its name.

Prior to Lancaster's acquisition of the land, however, a group of men wishing to form a yacht club entered into a grant agreement with the West Rockaway Land Company in 1905. The group, which had named itself the Belle Harbor Yacht Club, bought property from the company for four thousand dollars. The agreement included two hundred square feet of land and thirty plots of upland. That same year, the group received corporation status by the State of New York, and by 1908 began participating in its first inter-club ocean races with some of the city's other yacht clubs.

The earliest homes in Belle Harbor were built circa 1910. Over the next four decades, hundreds of single- and two-family houses were built from beach to bay, filling most of the land by the early 1950s. In the 1960s and 1970s, the neighborhood became a haven for working class and lower-middle-class families looking to escape the congestion of "mainland" Brooklyn and Queens. Many civil servants, including teachers, firefighters and police officers owned homes in the neighborhood. The housing bubbles in the late 1980s and early 2000s brought a different mix of residents but many many third and fourth generation residents remain.

=== Disasters ===
==== September 11, 2001 ====
The neighborhood suffered heavy losses from the September 11, 2001, terrorist attacks. These included several members of the Fire Department of New York—ranging from probationary firefighter to captain—and people who worked at the World Trade Center. The names of the 343 firefighters killed at the World Trade Center are listed on a monument at Tribute Park on Beach Channel Drive and Beach 116 Street, a 0.83-acre (0.34 ha) park marking the 75 area residents killed in the attacks, which then-mayor Michael Bloomberg cited as "more than any other neighborhood in the city".

==== American Airlines Flight 587 ====
On November 12, 2001, American Airlines Flight 587, bound for Santo Domingo in the Dominican Republic, crashed in the center of Belle Harbor, killing all 260 passengers and crew on board, as well as five others on the ground. Many of the passengers on the plane were from the Dominican community in Washington Heights. After consultation with families in the Belle Harbor and Washington Heights communities, a memorial was erected at Beach 116th Street in Rockaway Park, a major shopping district and transportation hub in the area. Although a temporary memorial was developed at the actual site of the disaster, on Newport Avenue, many still annually gravitate toward the Rockaway Park area for commemoration. In 2001, a resident stated to The Guardian, "It's impossible to understand unless you live here." Father Michael Geraghty, a priest quoted in the same article, said that it was common for people to live in the houses that their parents lived in and that many families lived in the same houses for generations. "

==== Hurricane Sandy ====
Belle Harbor was further devastated by Hurricane Sandy on October 29, 2012. The storm surge from the Atlantic Ocean completely inundated the peninsula, sending waves through the streets and into Jamaica Bay. In addition, more than a dozen homes and the Harbor Light restaurant were completely destroyed by fire. The neighborhood has almost completely recovered.

== Demographics ==
Based on data from the 2010 United States census, the population of the combined area of Breezy Point/Belle Harbor/Rockaway Park/Broad Channel was 28,018, an increase of 1,307 (4.9%) from the 26,711 counted in 2000. Covering an area of 2,033.88 acres (823.08 ha), the four neighborhoods had a population density of 13.8 inhabitants per acre (8,800/sq mi).

The racial makeup of the neighborhoods was 78.3% (21,946) White, 7.5% (2,095) African American, 0.1% (29) Native American, 2.1% (595) Asian, 0.0% (8) Pacific Islander, 0.2% (66) from other races, and 0.9% (259) from two or more races. Hispanic or Latino of any race were 10.8% (3,020) of the population.

== Geography ==
Belle Harbor is a suburban enclave on the Rockaway Peninsula, on a narrow barrier peninsula sandwiched between the Atlantic Ocean to the south and Jamaica Bay to the north. It is also bordered by the neighborhood of Neponsit to the west and Rockaway Park to the east. Its broad, white sandy beaches draw residents and visitors to the area. As part of the New York City parks system, Rockaway Beach is open to the public. The beaches in Belle Harbor draw many down-for-the-day visitors (DFDs) during the week. Street parking is prohibited on weekends and holidays from May 15 to September 30. Visitors must use buses, bicycles or the ferry/shuttle service to access the neighborhood beaches during those times. The bike lanes on Rockaway Beach Blvd. connect to both the Rockaway and Riis Park boardwalks and are part of the Jamaica Bay Greenway Bike Path.

== Community ==
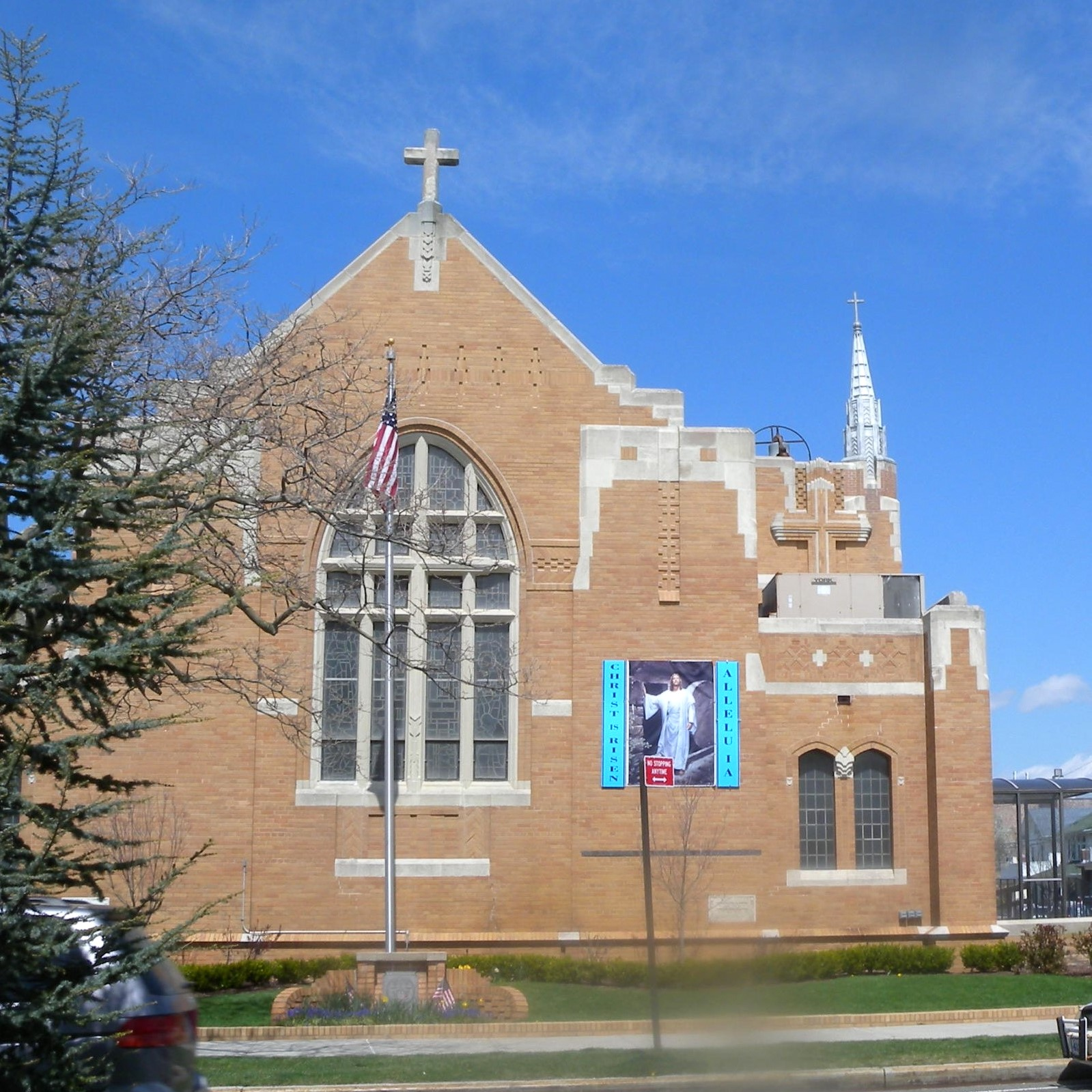
St Francis de Sales Catholic Church

Belle Harbor is primarily made up of single-family homes with many third and fourth generation Irish Catholic residents. The community also has Italian-American and Jewish American populations, and is home to a large number of New York City police officers and firefighters, both active and retired.

A commercial center is located on Beach 129th Street. A larger shopping area used by some residents of Belle Harbor is located on Beach 116th Street in Rockaway Park.

Since 1953, the neighborhood has been represented by the civic association Belle Harbor Property Owners Association.

== Transportation ==
Vehicular access to the area is available via the Marine Parkway–Gil Hodges Memorial Bridge, which provides access to Brooklyn, and the Cross Bay Veterans Memorial Bridge, which connects to Broad Channel and mainland Queens.

The A and S trains of the New York City Subway are available at the Rockaway Park–Beach 116th Street station. The Q35 and QM16 also serve the area.

A shuttle service from NYC Ferry connects Belle Harbor to the landing at Beach 108 Street on Jamaica Bay.

== Education ==
Belle Harbor residents are zoned for schools in the New York City Department of Education. Residents are zoned to PS/MS 114 Belle Harbor School for grades K-8.

Additionally there are private schools within the area including St. Francis de Sales Catholic Academy, a Catholic school of the Roman Catholic Diocese of Brooklyn and three Jewish schools: West End Temple Early Childhood Center (for pre-school), Tal Academy and Mercaz HaTorah of Belle Harbor
