= The Rockaway Times =

Weekly newspaper published in Rockaway Park, Queens, New York

The Rockaway Times is a community newspaper established in the neighborhood of Rockaway Park, Queens, New York, NY. They have been in operation since June 2014. The Rockaway Times is a weekly newspaper, coming out each Thursday. It is currently overseen by Publishers Sean McVeigh and Jeanne Ferriola and Managing Editor Katie McFadden. Former publisher and founder Kevin Boyle retired at the end of December 2022. The paper features articles covering events, news, features and more about the Rockaway community.
