= F (New York City Subway service) =

Rapid transit service

- Queens Boulevard Express/ Sixth Avenue Local

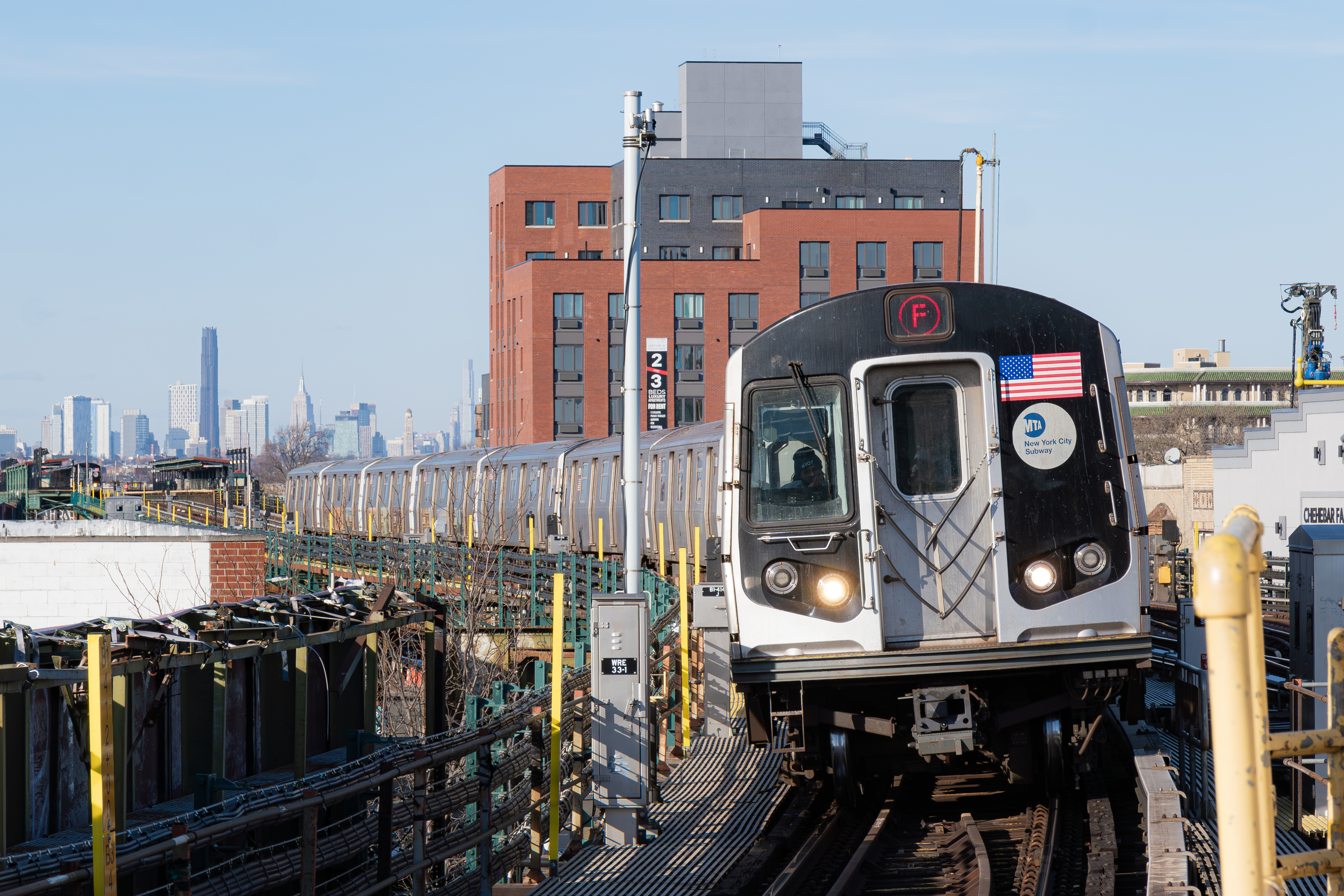
- Coney Island-bound F local train of R160s approaching Kings Highway.

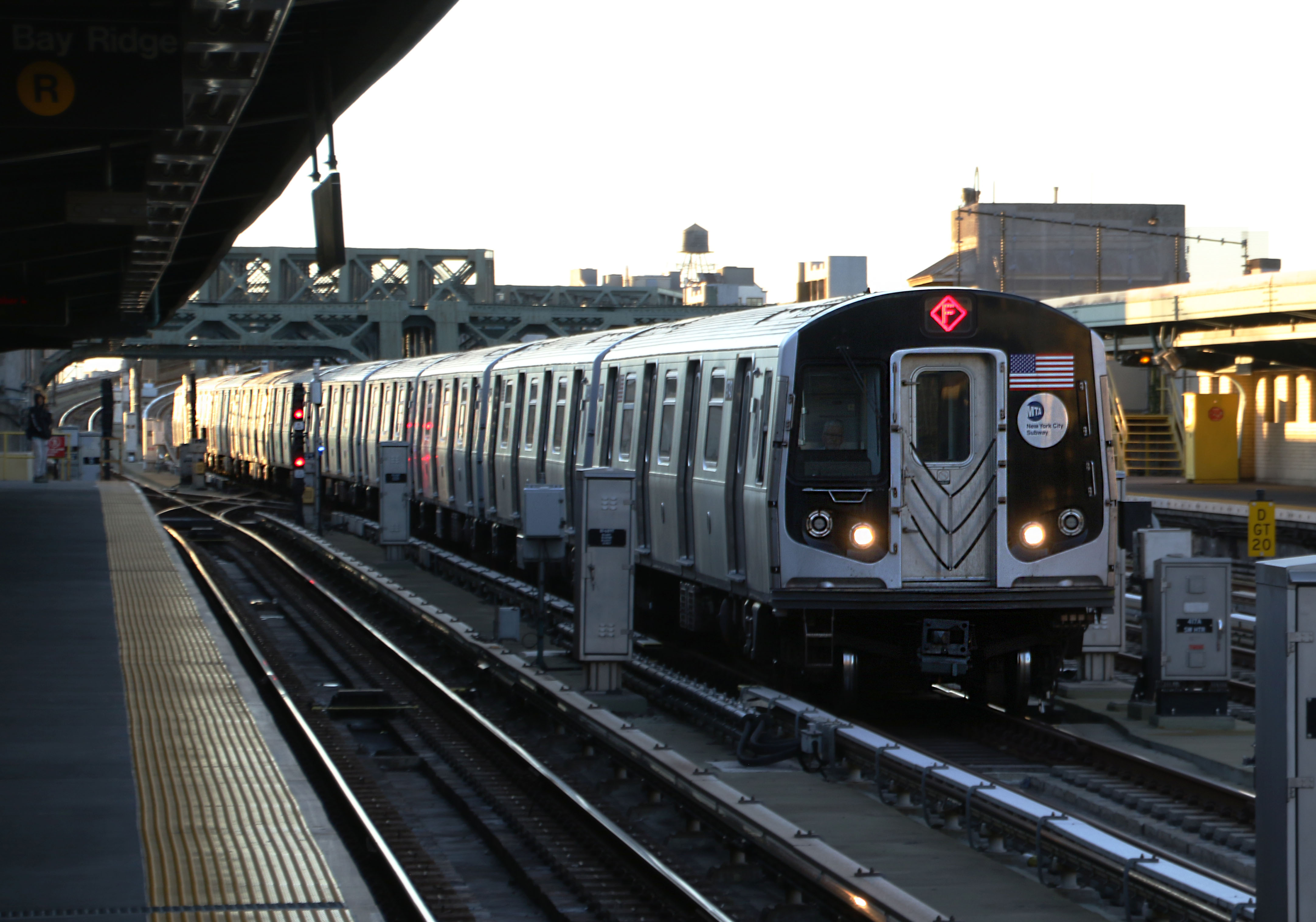
- Coney Island-bound F express train of R160s passing Fourth Avenue

- Note: Dashed red line shows late night and weekend service via the 63rd Street Tunnel.
- Northern end: Jamaica–179th Street
- Southern end: Coney Island–Stillwell Avenue or Kings Highway (limited)
- Stations: 55 (overnight); 45 (local service); 39 (express service)
- Rolling stock: R160 (Rolling stock assignments subject to change)
- Depot: Jamaica Yard
- Started service: December 15, 1940; 85 years ago

The F and <F> Queens Boulevard Express/Sixth Avenue Local (Note: The Metropolitan Transportation Authority's official text map gives the route's name as the "F Sixth Avenue Local".) are two rapid transit services in the B Division of the New York City Subway. Their route bullets are colored orange, since they use and are part of the IND Sixth Avenue Line in Manhattan.

The F operates 24 hours daily between 179th Street in Jamaica, Queens and Stillwell Avenue in Coney Island, Brooklyn. Daytime service makes express stops in Queens and all stops in Manhattan and Brooklyn; overnight service makes all stops along the full route. Limited rush hour service operates along the full route and makes express stops between Jay Street and Church Avenue in the peak direction only, making one intermediate stop at Seventh Avenue; this express service was introduced in September 2019. In Brooklyn, local service is denoted as (F) in a circle-shaped bullet while express service is denoted as <F> in a diamond-shaped bullet.

From 1968 to 1976, the F ran express along the IND Culver Line in Brooklyn. The F also ran via the 53rd Street Tunnel until moving to the 63rd Street Tunnel in 2001, except between August 2023 and March 2024 when service between Queens and Manhattan was rerouted to the 53rd Street Tunnel due to track replacement. F trains moved back to the 53rd Street Tunnel on weekdays during the day in December 2025. Since the 1990s, there have been calls to restore partial express service in Brooklyn from Jay Street–MetroTech to Church Avenue, although this has been controversial. The limited express <F> service between Jay Street and Church Avenue started on September 16, 2019, with two daily rush-hour trains in each direction. The F has a weekday ridership of 600,000.

== History ==
=== 1940s and 1950s ===
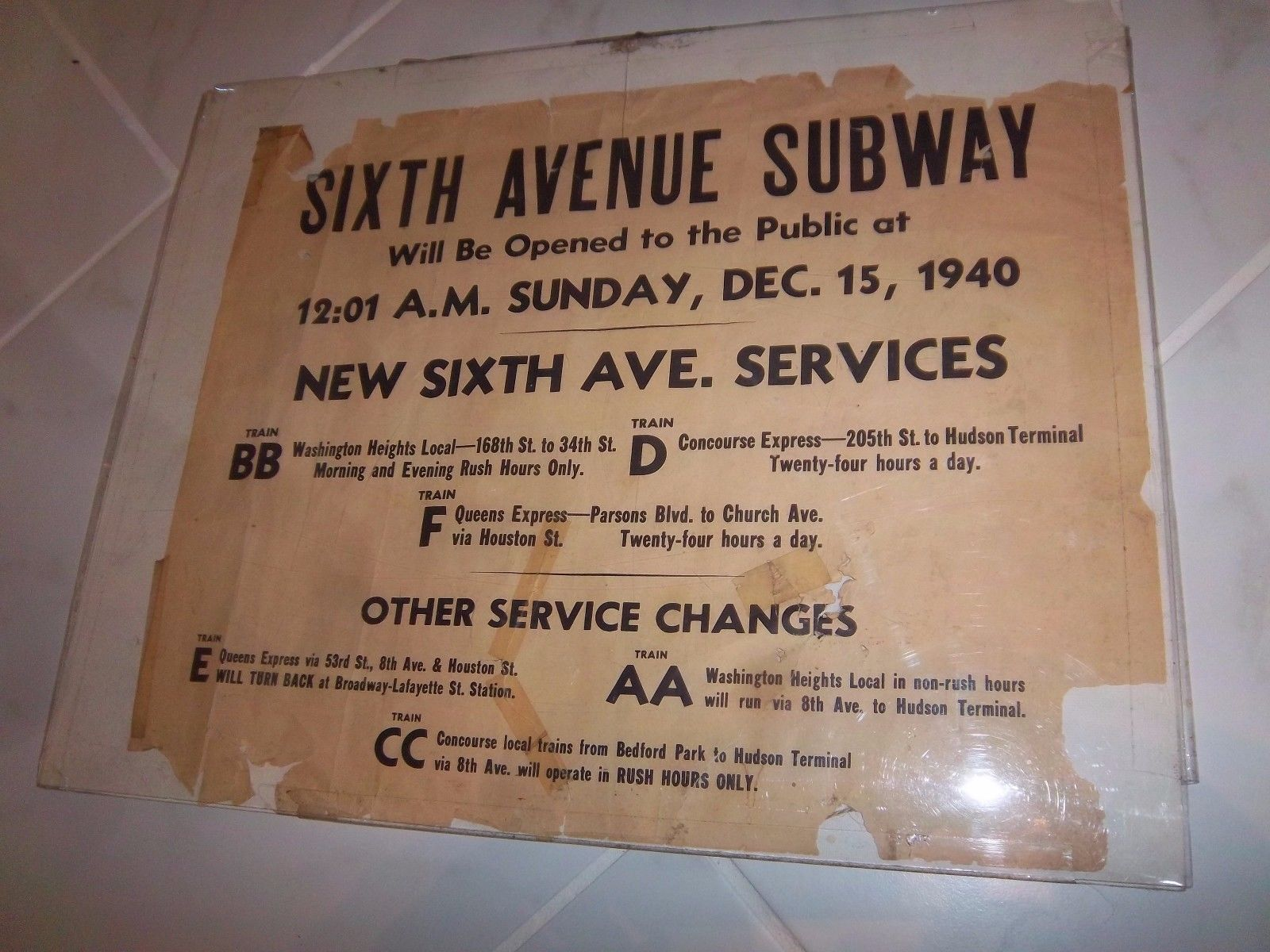
A poster notifying the opening of the Sixth Avenue Subway at 12:01 AM, Sunday, Dec 15, 1940

With the opening of the IND Sixth Avenue Line on December 15, 1940, F service began, operating as the line's Queens Boulevard service. It operated between Parsons Boulevard and Church Avenue via Queens Boulevard Line, Sixth Avenue Line, and the Culver Line. It ran express in Queens and local in Manhattan and Brooklyn. F trains provided an additional 24/7 express route in Queens, and inaugurated express service on the Queens Boulevard Line east of Continental Avenue. F trains ran on the express tracks between West Fourth Street and Broadway-Lafayette Street to avoid conflict with the D and E south of West Fourth Street. This service pattern was first announced by the New York City Board of Transportation on December 1, 1939. With the start of F service, E service was cut back from Church Avenue to Broadway–Lafayette Street.

On January 10, 1944, trains were extended to 169th Street during evenings, late nights, and Sunday mornings. Temporarily in 1948, as shown in a map from that year, the D and F service switched, with the F terminating at Second Avenue, but this was subsequently rescinded.

On December 11, 1950, trains were extended to the newly opened Jamaica–179th Street on evenings, nights, and Sunday mornings. On May 13, 1951, all trains outside of rush hour were extended to 179th Street using the local tracks beyond Parsons Boulevard. On October 8, 1951, trains were extended to 179th Street at all times. During rush hours F trains skipped 169th Street running via the express tracks. At other times, the F stopped at 169th Street.

On June 30, 1952, two morning rush hour trips on both the E and F trains, running between 71st Avenue and Jay Street. E and F trains each began running every three minutes for 24 minutes in the AM rush, and every 3.5 minutes for 45 minutes in the PM rush.

In 1953, the platforms were lengthened to 660 feet (200 m) at 75th Avenue and Sutphin Boulevard so that F trains could run eleven-car trains. The E and F began running eleven-car trains during rush hours on September 8, 1953. The extra train car increased the total carrying capacity by 4,000 passengers. The lengthening project cost $400,000. Ten 11-car trains operated on each of the E and F trains.

The operation of eleven-car trains ended on September 8, 1958. While the schedule had included the continued operation of 11-car trains, with two conductors, that was cancelled after a labor arbitrator ruled that all trains could run with a single conductor. The signal blocks, especially in Manhattan, were too short to accommodate the longer trains, and the motormen had a very small margin of error to properly platform the train. It was found that operating ten-car trains allowed for two additional trains per hour to be scheduled.

On October 30, 1954, the connection between the IND Culver Line and BMT Culver Line opened, with the IND taking over the elevated section. All F service began terminating at Broadway–Lafayette Street with D service entering Brooklyn via the Rutgers Street Tunnel. In addition, weekend and night trains began running local between Continental Avenue and 179th Street. During middays and early evenings, trains stopped at 169th Street. On April 29, 1956, trains were extended to Second Avenue.

Beginning on October 6, 1957, trains began terminating at 34th Street–Herald Square during nights and weekends. Between September 8 and November 7, 1958, two F trains ran between Forest Hills and Second Avenue, leaving Forest Hills at 8:06 and 8:21 a.m. On November 10, they were routed to Hudson Terminal, before returning to Queens in E service. On the same day, F service was cut back from Second Avenue and started terminating at Broadway–Lafayette Street to allow for construction on the Chrystie Street Connection.

=== 1960s through 1980s ===
Two additional F trains began running from Parsons Boulevard during the morning rush hour on April 6, 1964; these trips began entering service at 179th Street on December 21, 1964. On December 13, 1965, two morning F trains began running to Chambers Street. Beginning on July 11, 1966, trains no longer ran express between Parsons Boulevard and 71st–Continental Avenues weekday middays, and were extended weekdays daytime from Broadway-Lafayette Street back to Second Avenue. On August 30, 1966, service was cut back to Broadway-Lafayette Street.

With the opening of the Chrystie Street Connection on November 26, 1967, D service was rerouted via this connection, the north side of the Manhattan Bridge, and the BMT Brighton Line in Brooklyn. F service replaced it on the IND Culver Line, with trips running to Coney Island at all times, with supplemental trips to Church Avenue during rush hours.

Beginning on August 19, 1968, rush hour express service was added, in both directions, between Jay Street-Borough Hall and Church Avenue, and in rush hours, peak direction trains to and from Stillwell Avenue (alternating with those terminating at Kings Highway) ran express as well between Church Avenue and Kings Highway. Beginning on June 16, 1969, express service was modified, with Kings Highway trains operating as locals along the entire route from Jay Street to Kings Highway.

On January 2, 1973, Kings Highway F trains began running express once again between Church Avenue and Jay Street in both directions. In addition, F trains began running express between 179th Street and Continental Avenue weekdays between 7:30 a.m. and 7:30 p.m. toward Queens, and between 6:00 a.m. and 6:15 p.m. toward Manhattan. In addition, between 10:00 a.m. and 2:20 p.m. Manhattan-bound, and between 10:00 a.m. and 3:00 p.m. Queens-bound, F trains would stop at 169th Street.

On January 18, 1976, F express service between Jay Street and Church Avenue was discontinued during rush hours in the peak direction, and only Coney Island trains in the reverse-peak direction ran express between Jay Street and Church Avenue. Peak direction GG trains were cut back to Smith–Ninth Streets. On August 30, 1976, express service between Bergen Street and Church Avenue was completely discontinued, with all trains making all stops. Rush direction alternate-train express service between Ditmas Avenue and Kings Highway was retained. In addition, several northbound trips in the morning rush hour began being put into service at Avenue X. GG trains began terminating at Smith–9th Streets at all times. The elimination of express service was made as part of service changes which eliminated 215 runs that were deemed underutilized to reduce operating deficits. The changes, which saved $3.1 million annually, were part of a three phase cut in service that began in 1975. This change was also made due to continuing complaints about reduced Manhattan service by riders at local stations.

On January 24, 1977, as part of a series of NYCTA service cuts to save $13 million, many subway lines began running shorter trains during middays. As part of the change, F trains began running with four cars between 9:50 a.m. and 1:50 p.m. Starting on August 27, 1977, the F was made a local in Queens between Continental Avenue and Queens Plaza, late nights, replacing the GG service, which was cut back to Queens Plaza. This change was made as part of the last round of cuts in subway service announced in January 1977 to reduce annual operating costs by $30 million. Changes were also made in A, AA, B and N service. The NYCTA said that the cuts only duplicated other night service, and for most, would increase travel by a few minutes.

Until 1986, 2 E trains and 2 F trains started at Continental Avenue in the morning rush hour with the intention to relieve congestion. These trains were eliminated because they resulted in a loading imbalance as these lightly loaded trains would be followed by extremely crowded trains from 179th Street, which followed an 8-minute gap of E and F service from 179th Street.

On May 24, 1987, N and R services swapped terminals in Queens to provide R trains direct access to the Jamaica Yard. As part of the reroute plan, F service along Queens Boulevard was discontinued during late nights (1 a.m. to 5 a.m.). Late night local service was replaced by the R, which ran as a Queens Boulevard Local at all times. F trains were cut back to 57th Street on the Sixth Avenue Line during late nights. In 1986, the TA studied which two services should serve the line during late nights as ridership at this time did not justify three services. A public hearing was held in December 1986, and it was determined that having the E and R run during late nights provided the best service.

Peak-direction F express service on the Culver Line in Brooklyn, between Kings Highway and 18th Avenue, was suspended on April 27, 1987, because of work to reconstruct station mezzanines along that part of the Culver Line, and was never restored in this section.

=== Archer and 63rd Street changes ===
On December 11, 1988, the Archer Avenue Lines opened, and the E was rerouted to its current terminus at Jamaica Center, running via the Queens Boulevard Line's express tracks. It was decided that the E would serve Archer Avenue, rather than the F, to minimize disruption to passengers who continued to use Hillside Avenue; to maximize Jamaica Avenue ridership; and to take advantage of the length of the peak ridership period, which is longer on the F. It was found that most riders using bus routes that now served Archer Avenue used the E, while most passengers on buses to 179th Street used the F. F trains no longer stopped at 169th Street between 10 a.m. and 3:30 p.m., so the R was extended to 179th Street to serve local stations east of Continental Avenue and to allow F trains to continue running express to 179th Street.

The 1988 changes angered some riders because they resulted in the loss of direct Queens Boulevard Express service at local stations east of 71st Avenue—namely the 169th Street, Sutphin Boulevard, Van Wyck Boulevard and 75th Avenue stations. Local elected officials pressured the MTA to eliminate all-local service at these stations. On September 30, 1990, the R was cut back to 71st–Continental Avenue outside of rush hours. Late night service to 179th Street was replaced by G service, while F trains began running local east of 71st Avenue during middays, evenings, and weekends. In response to the pleas of local officials, the MTA considered three options including leaving service as is, having E trains run local east of 71st Avenue along with R service, and having F trains run local east of 71st Avenue to replace R service. The third option was chosen for testing in October or November 1992.

On October 26, 1992, R trains were cut back to 71st Avenue at all times. In its place, the F ran local between 71st Avenue and 179th Street at all times, which eliminated express service along Hillside Avenue. This change was implemented for six months on an experimental basis at the request of passengers using the 169th Street, Sutphin Boulevard, Van Wyck Boulevard and 75th Avenue stations, which had lost direct Queens Boulevard Express service in 1988. After the six months, the change was kept even though 77% of passengers had benefitted from the pre-October 1992 service plan because there was minimal negative passenger reaction and the intensity of the request. The change increased travel time along the F by 3 1/2 minutes, and reduced travel time for passengers at local stations by one to two minutes.

On October 29, 1989, the IND 63rd Street Line opened. Since Q trains did not run during late nights, a special daily late night F–Q service ran during these hours; in the northbound direction, F trains would operate along its normal route from Coney Island to 47th–50th Streets–Rockefeller Center, then turn into a Q and operate to 21st Street–Queensbridge; in the southbound direction, Q trains would operate from 21st Street to 47th–50th Streets, then turn into an F train and operate along its normal route to Coney Island. The special F/Q service was eventually designated as F in April 1993.

In March 1997, late night service was cut back to 57th Street due to work to reconstruct the trackbed in the 63rd Street Tunnel. A single-track shuttle provided service between 57th Street and 21st Street.

On August 30, 1997, late night F service was restored to 179th Street as a Queens Boulevard local, replacing G service, which was cut back to Court Square. Service on the 63rd Street Line was provided by a shuttle. On that date, E service began running local in Queens during late nights. These changes were made to accommodate construction work for the 63rd Street Connection.

On May 7, 2001, the F service started being rerouted via the new 63rd Street connector during some nights and weekends. On December 16, 2001, the 63rd Street Connector officially opened, connecting the IND 63rd Street Line with the IND Queens Boulevard Line. In a controversial move, the new local V service replaced the express F service in the heavily trafficked 53rd Street Tunnel between Manhattan and Queens, while F service was rerouted to the 63rd Street Tunnel and ran express in Queens between 71st Avenue and 21st Street–Queensbridge at all times. As part of the change, rush hour service was decreased from 18 trains per hour to 15 trains per hour, allowing E service to increase from 12 to 15 trains per hour. In addition, the frequency of weekday evening service was increased, with trains running every ten minutes instead of every 12 minutes.

On September 8, 2002, Stillwell Avenue was closed for reconstruction. F service was cut back to Avenue X, and service to Stillwell Avenue was replaced by a shuttle bus. F service returned to Stillwell Avenue on May 23, 2004, upon completion of the construction work.

=== Automation and further changes ===
An F train enters Jamaica-179th Street Station

In the 2010s, the MTA implemented communications-based train control (CBTC) on the portion of the IND Queens Boulevard Line west of Kew Gardens–Union Turnpike. The 63rd Street Connection to 21st Street–Queensbridge, used by the F. would also be retrofitted with CBTC. The automation of the Queens Boulevard Line meant that the E, F, and <F> services would be able to run 3 more trains during peak hours, up from 29 trains per hour before the project started. CBTC on the Queens Boulevard Line west of Union Turnpike was fully operational by February 2022. The 2015–2019 Capital Program was revised in April 2018 to fund to the design for the expedited installation of CBTC on the Queens Boulevard Line east of Kew Gardens–Union Turnpike.

Another part of the F route, between Church Avenue and West Eighth Street–New York Aquarium on the Culver Line, was selected for CBTC installation as part of the 2015–2019 Capital Program. During much of 2020 and 2021, there was no weekend F service south of Church Avenue to accommodate installation of CBTC on the IND Culver Line. In December 2022, the MTA announced that it would award a contract for the installation of CBTC on the Culver Line between Bergen Street and Church Avenue, which carries the F and G routes. As a result of these projects, the F would be automated along all of its route except for the segment south of West 8th Street.

On March 17, 2023, New York City Transit made adjustments to evening and late night E, F and R service to accommodate long-term CBTC installation on the Queens Boulevard Line between Union Turnpike and 179th Street. F service originating from 179th Street after 10:30 pm and from Stillwell Avenue after 8:30 pm began operating local in Queens during overnight hours, marking the return of overnight F local service since it was discontinued in 2001.

Between August 28, 2023 and April 1, 2024, F trains were rerouted via the 53rd Street Tunnel between Queens and Manhattan, and weekday M trains were truncated to 57th Street in Manhattan, due to track replacement and other repairs in the 63rd Street Tunnel. An F shuttle train (operated by East New York Yard) ran between Lexington Avenue-63rd Street and 21st Street-Queensbridge, stopping at Roosevelt Island, at all times except late nights. Shuttle buses ran between Queens Plaza and 21st Street–Queensbridge during the day and between Queens Plaza and Roosevelt Island at night. Service via 63rd Street resumed on April 1, 2024, and the shuttle was discontinued.

In June 2025, internal MTA documents were leaked, indicating that a proposal to reroute M trains through the 63rd Street Tunnel and reroute F trains through the 53rd Street Tunnel would be presented for approval in fall 2025. If approved, the route swap would be implemented by December. The route swap is anticipated to reduce overcrowding at 63rd Street line stations, as well as reduce reliance on critical interlockings west of the 36th Street station in Queens. In September 2025, the MTA confirmed that the F and M trains would swap routings on weekdays starting on December 8, 2025, with the F running via 53rd Street and the M running via 63rd Street. During its first six months, the swap resulted in slight decreases in end-to-end running times on the F and M routes.

=== Restoration of Brooklyn express service ===
In January 1991, express service was proposed to speed service during the height of rush hours which would have reduced travel time by up to five minutes. Alternate F trains would operate express in both directions between Jay Street and Church Avenue, stopping at Seventh Avenue; to prevent delays in express service, G trains would be cut back from its southern terminal at Smith–Ninth Streets and originate and terminate at Bergen Street. This service change would have been implemented in October 1991, pending approval from the MTA board.

In the 2000s, there was community support for resuming express service on the Culver Line between Jay Street–MetroTech and Church Avenue in Brooklyn, including from Mayor Michael Bloomberg and Senator Daniel Squadron. The MTA announced that after the elevated Culver Viaduct underwent extensive renovations from 2009 to 2012, "There will be no impediment to implementing the F express."

While F express service was contested for four years by some residents on the Culver Line who feared they would lose a one-seat ride into Manhattan, some politicians drafted a letter in 2014 petitioning for express service. In late October 2015, city officials considered implementing express service. Some rush-hour peak-direction F trains ran express between Jay Street and Fourth Avenue since at least 2015 and the MTA once planned to use expanded rush-hour express service (Jay Street to Church Avenue) in both directions in the summers of 2016 and 2017. In May 2016, the MTA announced half of all rush-hour F trains could start running express in fall 2017, with the train frequency on the rest of the F's route remaining the same; this was never implemented. However, this service still remained "under consideration" as of 2017.

In July 2019, the MTA announced that it planned to run four express F trains per day, two in each direction. The express service started on September 16, 2019; the two northbound trains ran during the morning, and the two southbound trains ran during the afternoon. The trains run in the peak direction, toward Manhattan in the morning and toward Brooklyn in the evening. The trains make an intermediate stop at Seventh Avenue and bypass a total of six stations. The trains toward Manhattan run between 7 and 7:30 a.m., while the trains toward Coney Island run between 4:25 and 5 p.m. The service frequencies along the line are not changed, as the two express trips in each direction were converted from trips that ran local. This service is represented with a diamond <F> similar to the symbol used on other peak-direction express services. The express service was suspended in March 2020 due to the COVID-19 pandemic, but was restored more than a year later, on May 3, 2021.

== Route ==
=== Signage history ===
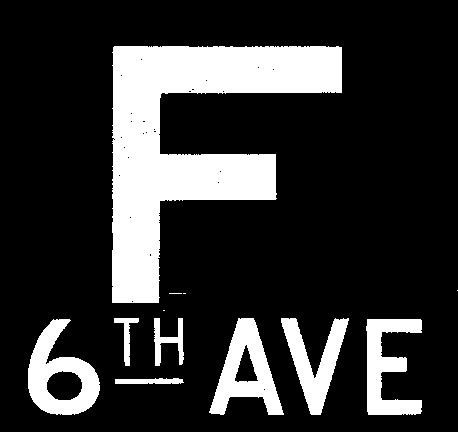
Pre-1967 bullet used on the R1s to R38s

1967–1979 bullet

The local bullet used since 1979

The express bullet used since 2019

=== Service pattern ===
The F uses the following lines:

Line	From	To	Tracks	Times			
Line	From	To	Tracks	F service			F diamond service
Line	From	To	Tracks	weekdays	weekends	evenings and late nights	rush hours, peak direction
IND Queens Boulevard Line	Jamaica–179th Street	75th Avenue	local				Limited service
IND Queens Boulevard Line	Forest Hills–71st Avenue	36th Street	local				
IND Queens Boulevard Line	Forest Hills–71st Avenue	36th Street	express				Limited service
IND Queens Boulevard Line	Queens Plaza		express				Limited service
IND Queens Boulevard Line	Court Square–23rd Street	Fifth Avenue/53rd Street	all				Limited service
IND 63rd Street Line (full line)	21st Street–Queensbridge	Lexington Avenue–63rd Street	all				Limited service
IND Sixth Avenue Line	57th Street		all				Limited service
IND Sixth Avenue Line	47th–50th Streets–Rockefeller Center	Second Avenue	local				Limited service
IND Sixth Avenue Line	Delancey Street	York Street	all				Limited service
IND Culver Line (full line)	Jay Street–MetroTech	Church Avenue	local				
IND Culver Line (full line)	Jay Street–MetroTech	Church Avenue	express				Limited service
IND Culver Line (full line)	Ditmas Avenue	Coney Island–Stillwell Avenue	local				Limited service

=== Stations ===
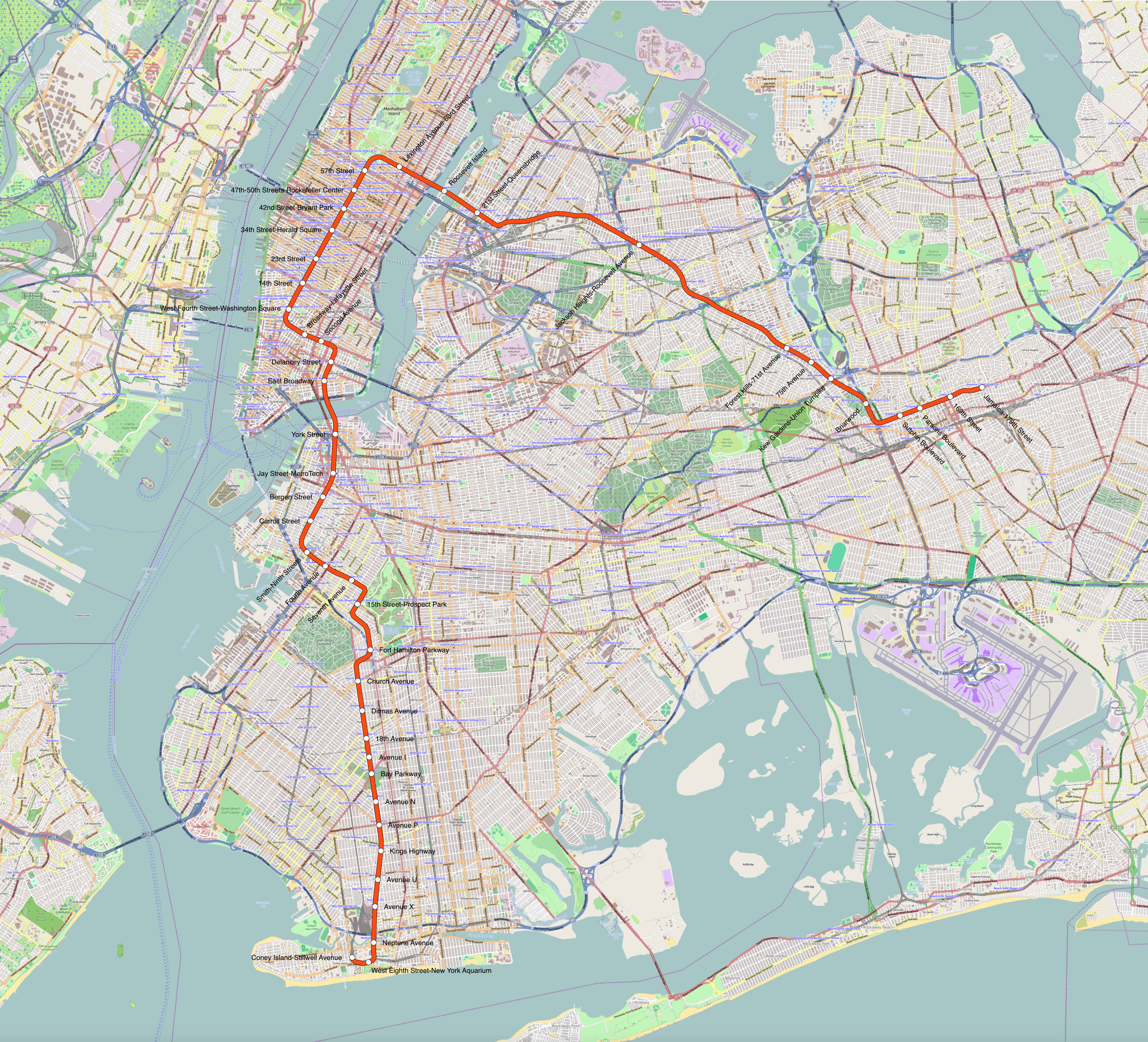
To scale line map

For a more detailed station listing, see the articles on the lines listed above.

Station service legend
Stops all times	Stops 24 hours a day
Stops all times except late nights	Stops every day during daytime hours only
Stops late nights only	Stops every day during overnight hours only
Stops late nights and weekends	Stops everyday during overnight hours and weekends during daytime hours only
Stops weekdays during the day	Stops during weekday daytime hours only
Stops rush hours only (limited service)	Stops during weekday rush hours only (limited service)
Stops rush hours in the peak direction only (limited service)	Stops during weekday rush hours in the peak direction only (limited service)
Station closed	Station closed
Stops rush hours in the peak direction only	Stops rush hours/weekdays in the peak direction only
Time period details
Disabled access	Station is compliant with the Americans with Disabilities Act
↑	Station is compliant with the Americans with Disabilities Act in the indicated direction only
↓	Station is compliant with the Americans with Disabilities Act in the indicated direction only
	Elevator access to mezzanine only

F service	F Brooklyn Express service	Stations	Disabled access	Subway transfers	Connections and notes
Queens
Queens Boulevard Line
Stops all times	Stops rush hours in the peak direction only (limited service)	Jamaica–179th Street	Disabled access	E	Q3 bus to JFK Int'l Airport
Stops all times	Stops rush hours in the peak direction only (limited service)	169th Street		E	Q3 bus to JFK Int'l Airport
Stops all times	Stops rush hours in the peak direction only (limited service)	Parsons Boulevard		E	
Stops all times	Stops rush hours in the peak direction only (limited service)	Sutphin Boulevard		E	Q44 Select Bus Service
Stops all times	Stops rush hours in the peak direction only (limited service)	Briarwood	Elevator access to mezzanine only	E	Q44 Select Bus Service
Stops all times	Stops rush hours in the peak direction only (limited service)	Kew Gardens–Union Turnpike	Disabled access	E	Q10 and Q80 buses to JFK Airport
Stops all times	Stops rush hours in the peak direction only (limited service)	75th Avenue		E	
Stops all times	Stops rush hours in the peak direction only (limited service)	Forest Hills–71st Avenue	Disabled access	E M R	LIRR Main Line at Forest Hills
Stops late nights only	|	67th Avenue		E	
Stops late nights only	|	63rd Drive–Rego Park		E	Q72 bus to LaGuardia Airport
Stops late nights only	|	Woodhaven Boulevard		E	Q52/Q53 Select Bus Service
Stops late nights only	|	Grand Avenue–Newtown		E	Q53 Select Bus Service
Stops late nights only	|	Elmhurst Avenue		E	Q53 Select Bus Service
Stops all times	Stops rush hours in the peak direction only (limited service)	Jackson Heights–Roosevelt Avenue	Disabled access	E M R 7 (IRT Flushing Line)	Q33 bus to LaGuardia Airport Marine Air Terminal; Q53 Select Bus Service; Q70 Select Bus Service to LaGuardia Airport
Stops late nights only	|	65th Street		E	
Stops late nights only	|	Northern Boulevard	Disabled access	E	
Stops late nights only	|	46th Street		E	
Stops late nights only	|	Steinway Street		E	
Stops late nights only	|	36th Street		E	
Services via 53rd Street (weekdays) and 63rd Street (weekends and late nights) split
Queens Boulevard/53rd Street Line
Stops weekdays during the day	Stops rush hours in the peak direction only (limited service)	Queens Plaza	Disabled access	E R	
Stops weekdays during the day	Stops rush hours in the peak direction only (limited service)	Court Square–23rd Street	↓	E G (IND Crosstown Line); 7 <7> (IRT Flushing Line)	Station is ADA-accessible in the southbound direction only
Manhattan
Stops weekdays during the day	Stops rush hours in the peak direction only (limited service)	Lexington Avenue–53rd Street	Disabled access	E 6 <6> (IRT Lexington Avenue Line at 51st Street)	
Stops weekdays during the day	Stops rush hours in the peak direction only (limited service)	Fifth Avenue/53rd Street		E	
63rd Street Line
Stops late nights and weekends	—N/a	21st Street–Queensbridge	Disabled access		
Manhattan
Stops late nights and weekends	—N/a	Roosevelt Island	Disabled access		Roosevelt Island Tramway; NYC Ferry: Astoria route
Stops late nights and weekends	—N/a	Lexington Avenue–63rd Street	Disabled access	N Q R Out-of-system transfers with MetroCard/OMNY: 4 5 6 <6> (IRT Lexington Avenue Line at 59th Street); N R W (BMT Broadway Line at Lexington Avenue–59th Street)	
Sixth Avenue Line
Stops late nights and weekends	—N/a	57th Street	Disabled access		
Sixth Avenue Line (53rd and 63rd Street branches merge)
Stops all times	Stops rush hours in the peak direction only (limited service)	47th–50th Streets–Rockefeller Center	Disabled access	B D M	
Stops all times	Stops rush hours in the peak direction only (limited service)	42nd Street–Bryant Park	Elevator access to mezzanine only	B D M 7 <7> (IRT Flushing Line at Fifth Avenue); 1 2 3 (IRT Broadway–Seventh Avenue Line at Times Square–42nd Street, daytime only); N Q R W (BMT Broadway Line at Times Square–42nd Street, daytime only); S (42nd Street Shuttle at Times Square, daytime only); A C E (IND Eighth Avenue Line at 42nd Street–Port Authority Bus Terminal, daytime only)	
Stops all times	Stops rush hours in the peak direction only (limited service)	34th Street–Herald Square	Disabled access	B D M N Q R W (BMT Broadway Line)	M34 / M34A Select Bus Service; PATH at 33rd Street; Amtrak, LIRR, NJ Transit at Pennsylvania Station
Stops all times	Stops rush hours in the peak direction only (limited service)	23rd Street		M	M23 Select Bus Service; PATH at 23rd Street
Stops all times	Stops rush hours in the peak direction only (limited service)	14th Street	Disabled access	M L (BMT Canarsie Line at Sixth Avenue); 1 2 3 (IRT Broadway–Seventh Avenue Line at 14th Street)	PATH at 14th Street; M14A/D Select Bus Service
Stops all times	Stops rush hours in the peak direction only (limited service)	West Fourth Street–Washington Square	Disabled access	B D M A C E (IND Eighth Avenue Line)	PATH at Ninth Street
Stops all times	Stops rush hours in the peak direction only (limited service)	Broadway–Lafayette Street	Disabled access	B D M 4 6 <6> (IRT Lexington Avenue Line at Bleecker Street)	
Houston Street Branch
Stops all times	Stops rush hours in the peak direction only (limited service)	Second Avenue			M15 Select Bus Service
Stops all times	Stops rush hours in the peak direction only (limited service)	Delancey Street		J M Z (BMT Nassau Street Line at Essex Street)	M14A Select Bus Service
Stops all times	Stops rush hours in the peak direction only (limited service)	East Broadway			
Brooklyn
Stops all times	Stops rush hours in the peak direction only (limited service)	York Street			NYC Ferry: East River and South Brooklyn routes (at Old Fulton Street and Furman Street)
Culver Line
Stops all times	Stops rush hours in the peak direction only (limited service)	Jay Street–MetroTech	Disabled access	A C N R W (BMT Fourth Avenue Line)	
Stops all times	|	Bergen Street		G	
Stops all times	|	Carroll Street		G	
Stops all times	|	Smith–Ninth Streets		G	
Stops all times	|	Fourth Avenue		G D N R W (BMT Fourth Avenue Line at Ninth Street)	
Stops all times	Stops rush hours in the peak direction only (limited service)	Seventh Avenue	Disabled access	G	
Stops all times	|	15th Street–Prospect Park		G	
Stops all times	|	Fort Hamilton Parkway		G	
Stops all times	Stops rush hours in the peak direction only (limited service)	Church Avenue	Disabled access	G	Some rush hour trips in either direction begin and end their runs to Manhattan and Queens at this station
Stops all times	Stops rush hours in the peak direction only (limited service)	Ditmas Avenue			
Stops all times	Stops rush hours in the peak direction only (limited service)	18th Avenue			
Stops all times	Stops rush hours in the peak direction only (limited service)	Avenue I			
Stops all times	Stops rush hours in the peak direction only (limited service)	Bay Parkway			
Stops all times	Stops rush hours in the peak direction only (limited service)	Avenue N			
Stops all times	Stops rush hours in the peak direction only (limited service)	Avenue P			
Stops all times	Stops rush hours in the peak direction only (limited service)	Kings Highway	Disabled access		B82 Select Bus Service
Stops all times	Stops rush hours in the peak direction only (limited service)	Avenue U			
Stops all times	Stops rush hours in the peak direction only (limited service)	Avenue X			Some northbound a.m. rush hour trips begin at this station.
Stops all times	Stops rush hours in the peak direction only (limited service)	Neptune Avenue			
Stops all times	Stops rush hours in the peak direction only (limited service)	West Eighth Street–New York Aquarium		Q (BMT Brighton Line)	
Stops all times	Stops rush hours in the peak direction only (limited service)	Coney Island–Stillwell Avenue	Disabled access	D (BMT West End Line); N (BMT Sea Beach Line); Q (BMT Brighton Line)	
