= Grand Avenue–Newtown station =

New York City Subway station in Queens

Grand Avenue–Newtown
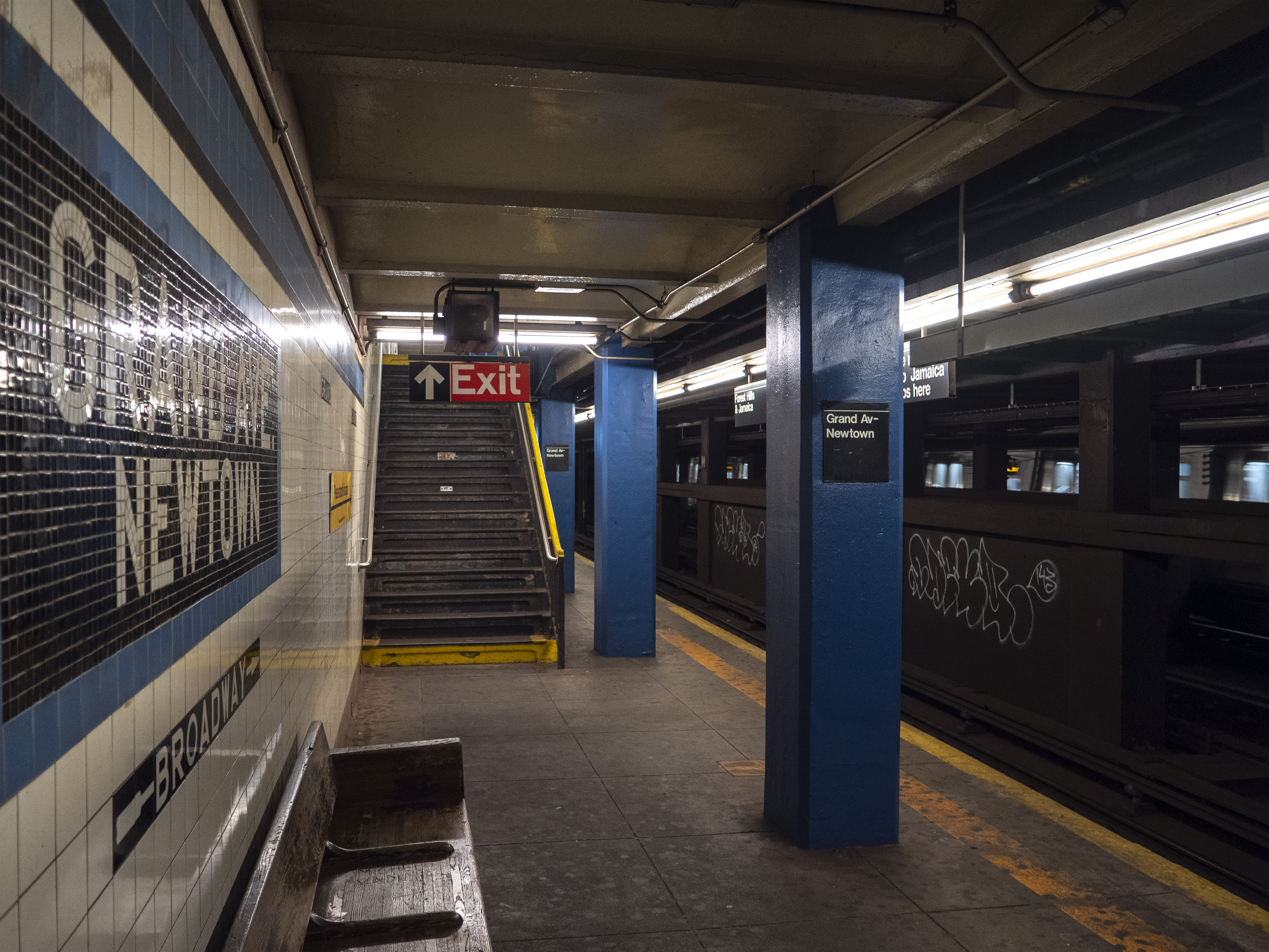
- View of northbound platform

Station statistics
- Address: Grand Avenue, Broadway & Queens Boulevard; Elmhurst, New York
- Borough: Queens
- Locale: Elmhurst
- Coordinates: 40.73695°N 73.877521°W
- Division: B (IND)
- Line: IND Queens Boulevard Line
- Services: E (late nights); F (late nights); M (weekdays during the day); R (all times except late nights)
- Transit: NYCT Bus: Q58, Q59, Q98; MTA Bus: Q53 SBS, Q60
- Structure: Underground
- Platforms: 2 side platforms
- Tracks: 4

Other information
- Opened: December 31, 1936; 89 years ago
- Accessible: No; planned

Traffic
- 2025: 4,502,971 ▲11.4%
- Rank: 68 out of 423
Services
Preceding station	New York City Subway	Following station
Elmhurst Avenue E F M R via 36th Street	Local	Woodhaven Boulevard E F M R toward Forest Hills–71st Avenue
does not stop here
Location
Location within New York City Subway
Location within New York City
Location within New York
Track layout
Street map
Station service legend
Symbol	Description
Stops all times except late nights	Stops all times except late nights
Stops late nights only	Stops late nights only
Stops weekdays during the day	Stops weekdays during the day

The Grand Avenue–Newtown station is a local station on the IND Queens Boulevard Line of the New York City Subway. Located under private property at the northeast corner of the intersection of Grand Avenue, Broadway, and Queens Boulevard in the neighborhood of Elmhurst, Queens, it is served by the M train on weekdays, and by the R train at all times except late nights, when the E and F trains take over service.

The station opened on December 31, 1936 as part of the Independent Subway System's Queens Boulevard Line. The opening of the station brought significant growth to Elmhurst.

== History ==
The Queens Boulevard Line was one of the first built by the city-owned Independent Subway System (IND), and was planned to stretch between the IND Eighth Avenue Line in Manhattan and 178th Street and Hillside Avenue in Jamaica, Queens, with a stop at Grand Avenue. The line was first proposed in 1925. Construction of the line was approved by the New York City Board of Estimate on October 4, 1928. The line was constructed using the cut-and-cover tunneling method, and to allow pedestrians to cross, temporary bridges were built over the trenches.

The first section of the line opened on August 19, 1933 from the connection to the Eighth Avenue Line at 50th Street to Roosevelt Avenue in Jackson Heights. Later that year, a $23 million loan was approved to finance the remainder of the line, along with other IND lines. The remainder of the line was built by the Public Works Administration. In 1934 and 1935, construction of the extension to Jamaica was suspended for 15 months and was halted by strikes. Construction was further delayed due to a strike in 1935, instigated by electricians opposing wages paid by the General Railway Signal Company.

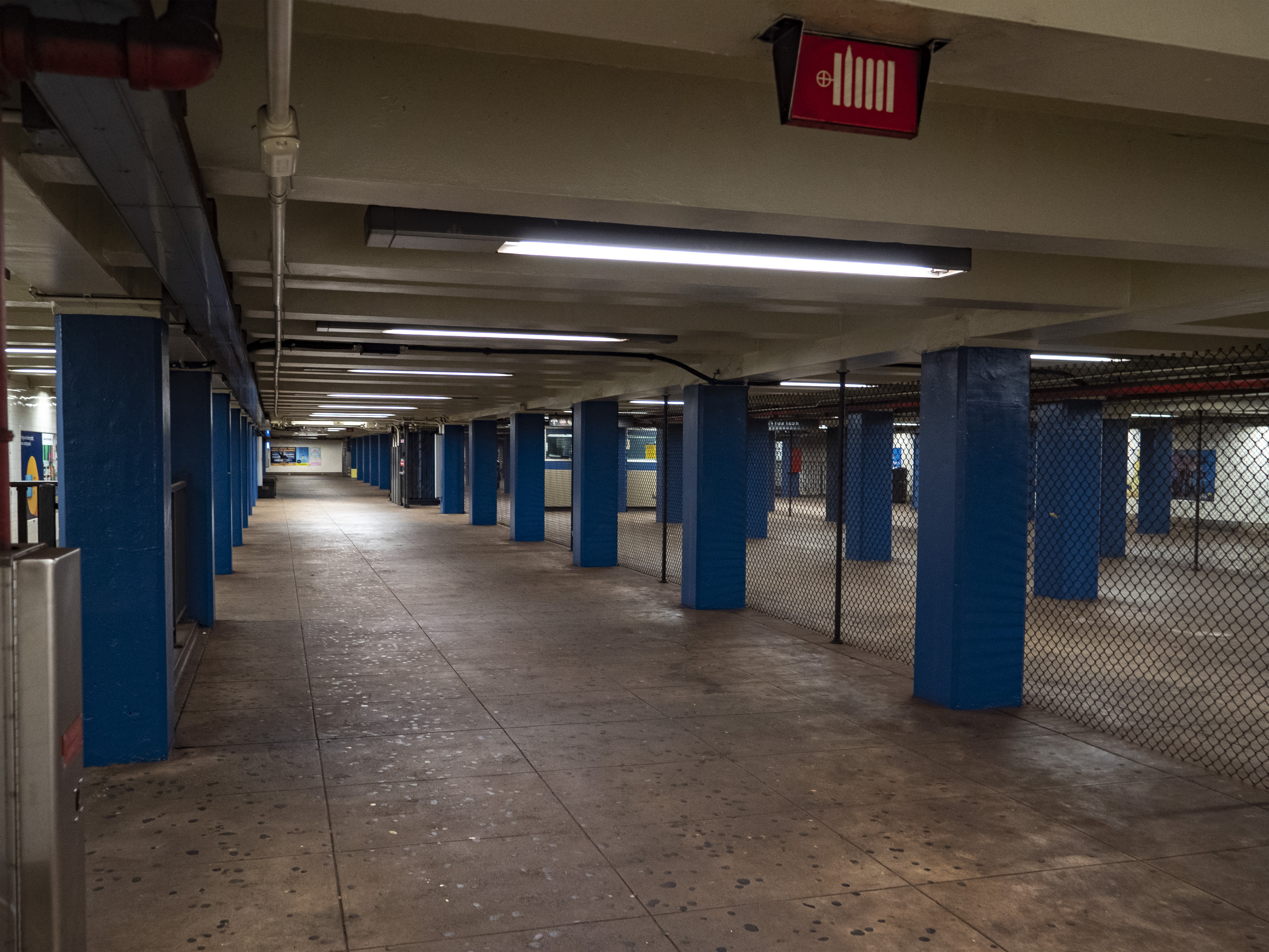
Mezzanine level

In August 1936, tracks were installed all the way to 178th Street, and the stations to Union Turnpike were completed. On December 31, 1936, the IND Queens Boulevard Line was extended by eight stops, and 3.5 miles (5.6 km), from its previous terminus at Roosevelt Avenue to Union Turnpike. The E train, which initially served all stops on the new extension, began making express stops in April 1937, and local GG trains began serving the extension at the time.

In Elmhurst, almost all of the century-old buildings in the heart of the village were destroyed for the construction of the subway. Land was taken on the west side of the Broadway to avoid the demolition of St. James Episcopal Church and the Reformed Church of Newtown. An easement was granted so the line could pass under the old St. James Church building at the southwest corner of Broadway and 51st Avenue. Many nineteenth century residences and the Wandowenock Fire Company buildings had to be torn down. To allow the subway line to curve into Queens Boulevard from Broadway, the northeast corner of the two streets was removed, in addition to some stores. New buildings were built behind a new curb line once the subway was completed, bringing a new face to Elmhurst. The introduction of the subway stimulated local growth in Elmhurst. Commercial buildings and apartment houses replaced existing structures.

The Metropolitan Transportation Authority announced in April 2024 that it would make esthetic improvements to the station during mid-2024 as part of its Re-New-Vation program. In July 2025, the MTA announced that it would install elevators at 12 stations, including the Grand Avenue–Newtown station, as part of its 2025–2029 capital program. The elevators would make the station fully compliant with the Americans with Disabilities Act of 1990.

== Station layout ==
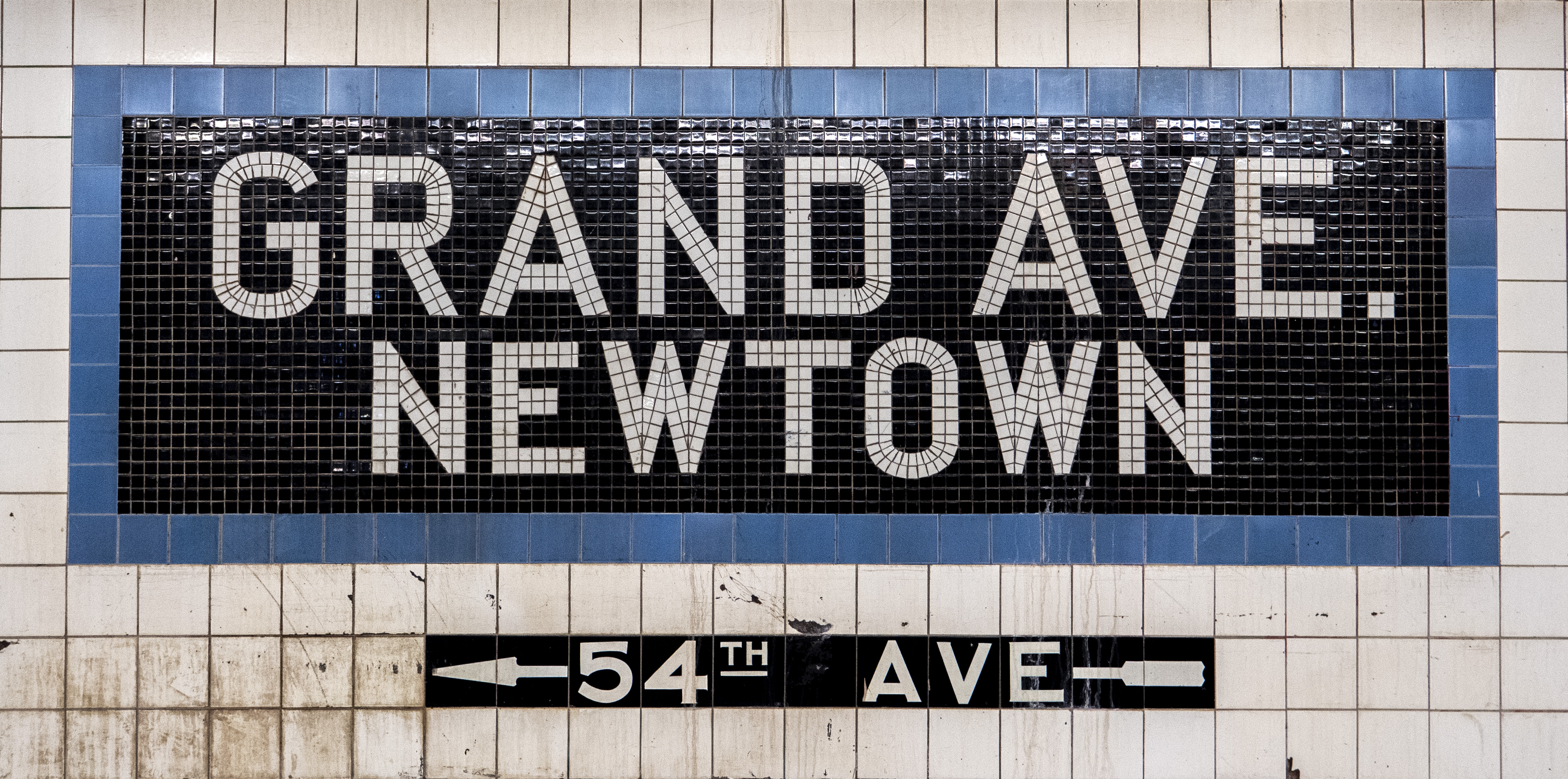
Mosaic name tablet

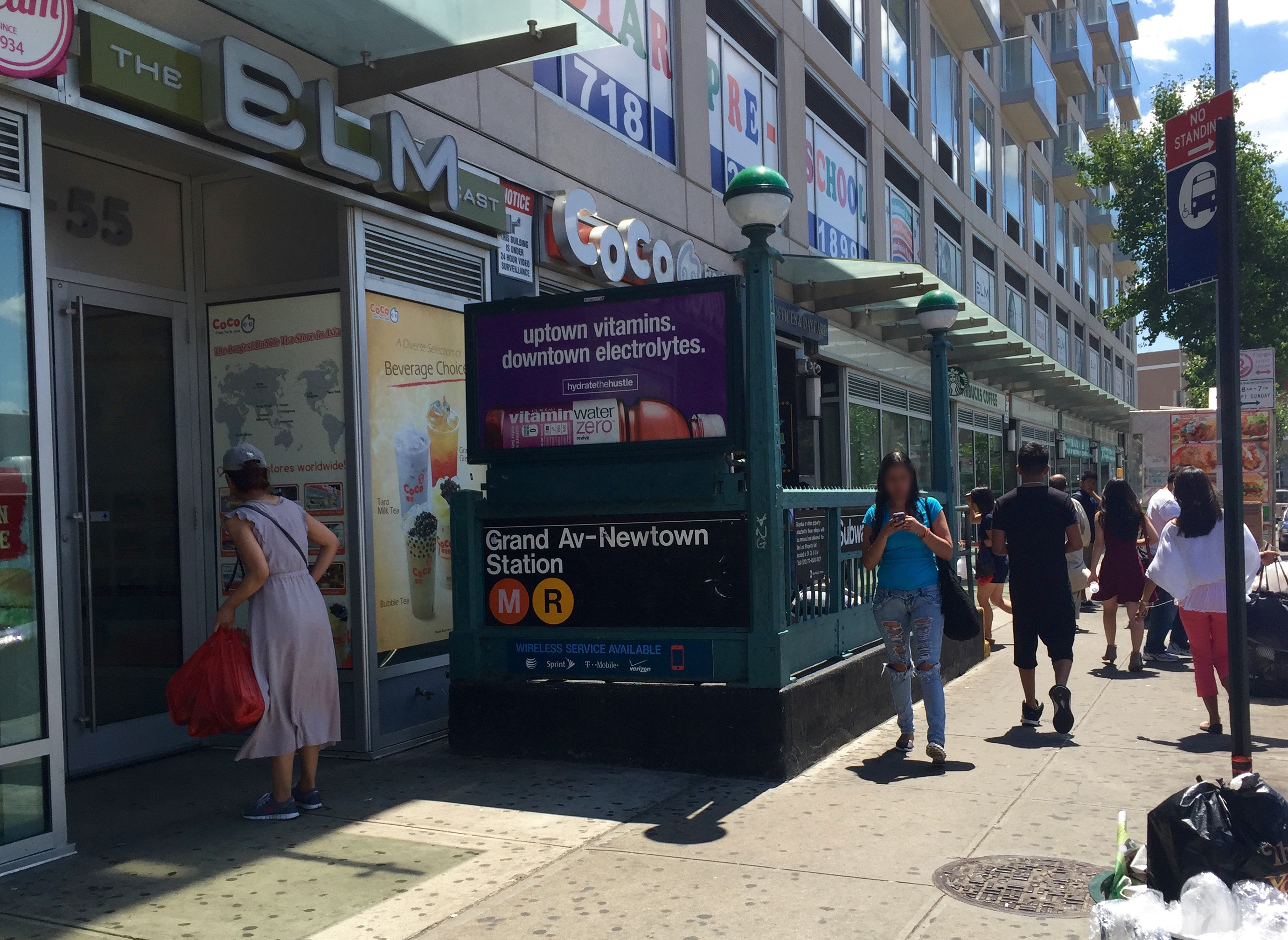
Entrance at Broadway

There are four tracks and two side platforms; the two center express tracks are used by the E and F trains at all times except late nights. The E and F trains serve the station at night, the M train serves the station on weekdays during the day, and the R train serves the station at all times except late nights. The station is between Elmhurst Avenue to the west and Woodhaven Boulevard to the east.

In between the local tracks and the express tracks, there are trackway walls. The station has a full length mezzanine, but as the fare control and booth area are at the center of the mezzanine, crossover is available only at the easternmost staircase.

Both platforms have a medium Cerulean blue tile band with a black border and mosaic name tablets reading "GRAND AVE. – NEWTOWN" broken onto two lines in white sans serif lettering on a black background and Cerulean blue border. The tile band was part of a color-coded tile system used throughout the IND. The tile colors were designed to facilitate navigation for travelers going away from Lower Manhattan. As such, the blue tiles used at the Grand Avenue station are also used at Jackson Heights–Roosevelt Avenue, the next express station to the west, while a different tile color is used at Forest Hills–71st Avenue, the next express station to the east. Blue tiles are similarly used at the other local stations between Roosevelt Avenue and 71st Avenue. Small tile captions reading "GRAND" in white lettering on black run below the trim line, and directional signs in the same style are present below some of the name tablets.

Concrete-clad columns, painted blue, run along both platforms at regular intervals with alternating ones having the standard black name plates in white lettering. These piers are located every 15 feet (4.6 m) and support girders above the platforms. The roof girders are also connected to columns in the walls adjoining each platform.

The tunnel is covered by a U-shaped trough that contains utility pipes and wires. The outer walls of this trough are composed of columns, spaced approximately every 5 feet (1.5 m) with concrete infill between them. There is a 1-inch (25 mm) gap between the tunnel wall and the platform wall, which is made of 4-inch (100 mm)-thick brick covered over by a tiled finish. The columns between the tracks are also spaced every 5 feet (1.5 m), with no infill.

=== Exits ===
Each side has two sets of street stairs. There is a full-time entrance at Justice Avenue and Broadway on the west end, with staircases to either side of Broadway. There are also exits to either southern corner of Queens Boulevard at 54th Avenue (the southeast-corner staircase being outside the First Presbyterian Church of Newtown complex), and another staircase to the northern side of Queens Boulevard at 54th Avenue.

High entry/exit turnstiles at both ends of the mezzanine allow people to exit fare control without having to walk down to the middle of the mezzanine. A free crossover between two platforms exists at this location. Originally, there were two fare control areas at each end, which is clear from the presence of two closed staircases at the Manhattan-bound side. The mezzanine narrows to about two-thirds of its width on the southern side of the mezzanine directly to the opposite of the closed staircases. The narrowing of the mezzanine did not allow for staircases on the Queens-bound side in this location like on the Manhattan-bound side. Chain-link fence is used to separate the areas inside and outside fare control. The Manhattan-bound and Queens-bound paid areas are separated by at this location by the unpaid area, which runs down the center of the mezzanine. In total, this side of the station has four staircases in addition to the two closed ones mentioned, while the other side has five staircases.
