= Tribute Park =

Public park in Queens, New York

Coordinates: 40°34′55″N 73°50′20″W

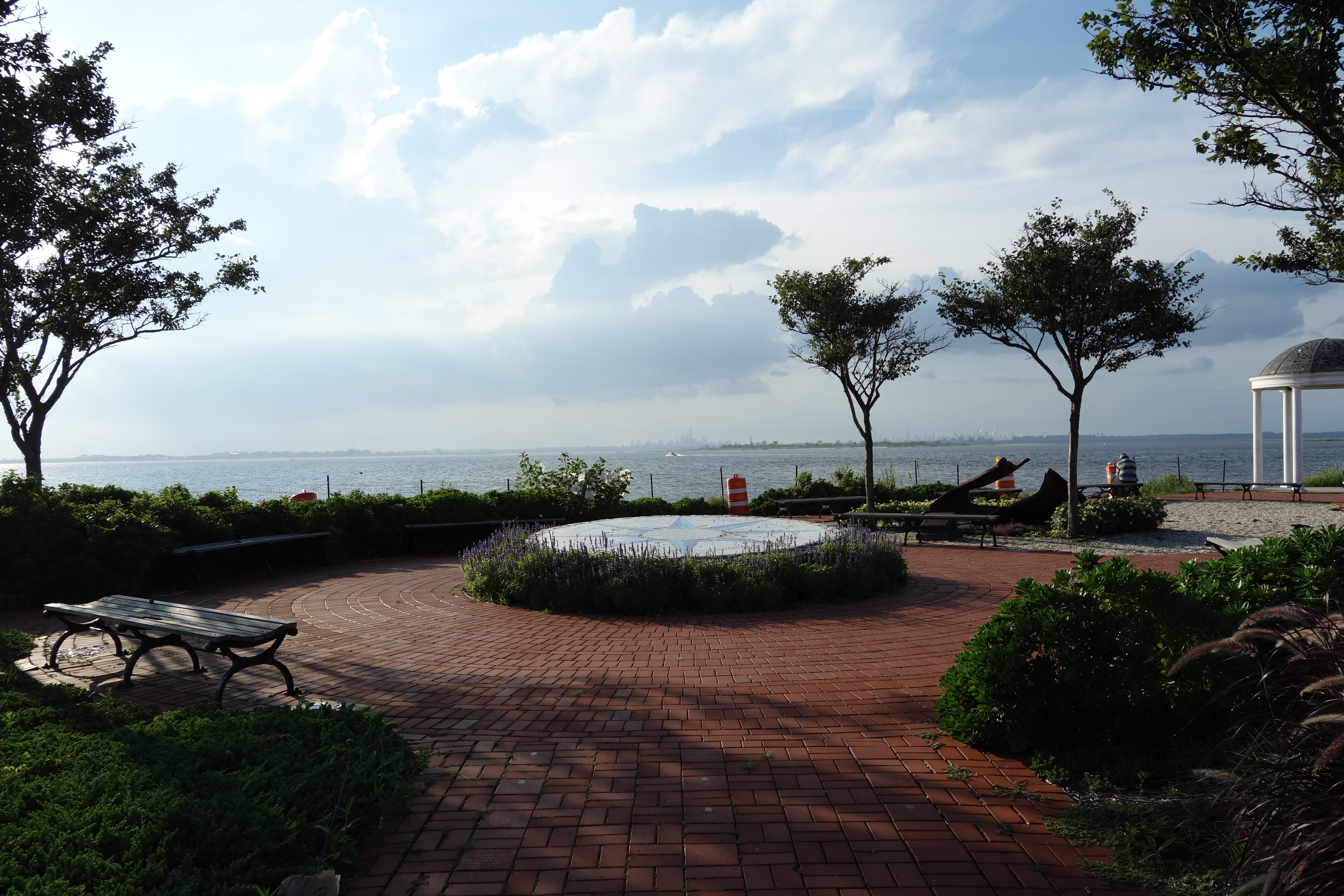
The center of Tribute Park in 2018.

Tribute Park is a 0.83-acre (0.34 ha) public green space in the Rockaway Park neighborhood of Queens, New York City. It is located at the corner of Beach Channel Drive and Beach 116th Street, facing Jamaica Bay.

At the time of the September 11 terrorist attacks, the park site was an undeveloped lot that provided an unobstructed view of the collapse of the World Trade Center. Following the attacks, local residents used this waterfront lot as a place to gather and remember the victims.

The Rockaway Chamber of Commerce and the Tribute Park Committee lobbied the city to designate this space as a park with a memorial. The garden section of the park was designed by Lynden Miller, and its pavilion by artist Patrick Clark. The park features a mosaic centerpiece pointing directly at Downtown Manhattan, a central path containing custom-inscribed memorial bricks designated as the "Fireman's Walk," the pavilion with a stained-glass dome, and a granite rock carved in the shape of a fireman's helmet engraved with the names of all 343 firefighters killed on September 11. The park was dedicated by Mayor Michael Bloomberg on November 6, 2005.
