= Elmhurst Avenue station =

New York City Subway station in Queens

Elmhurst Avenue
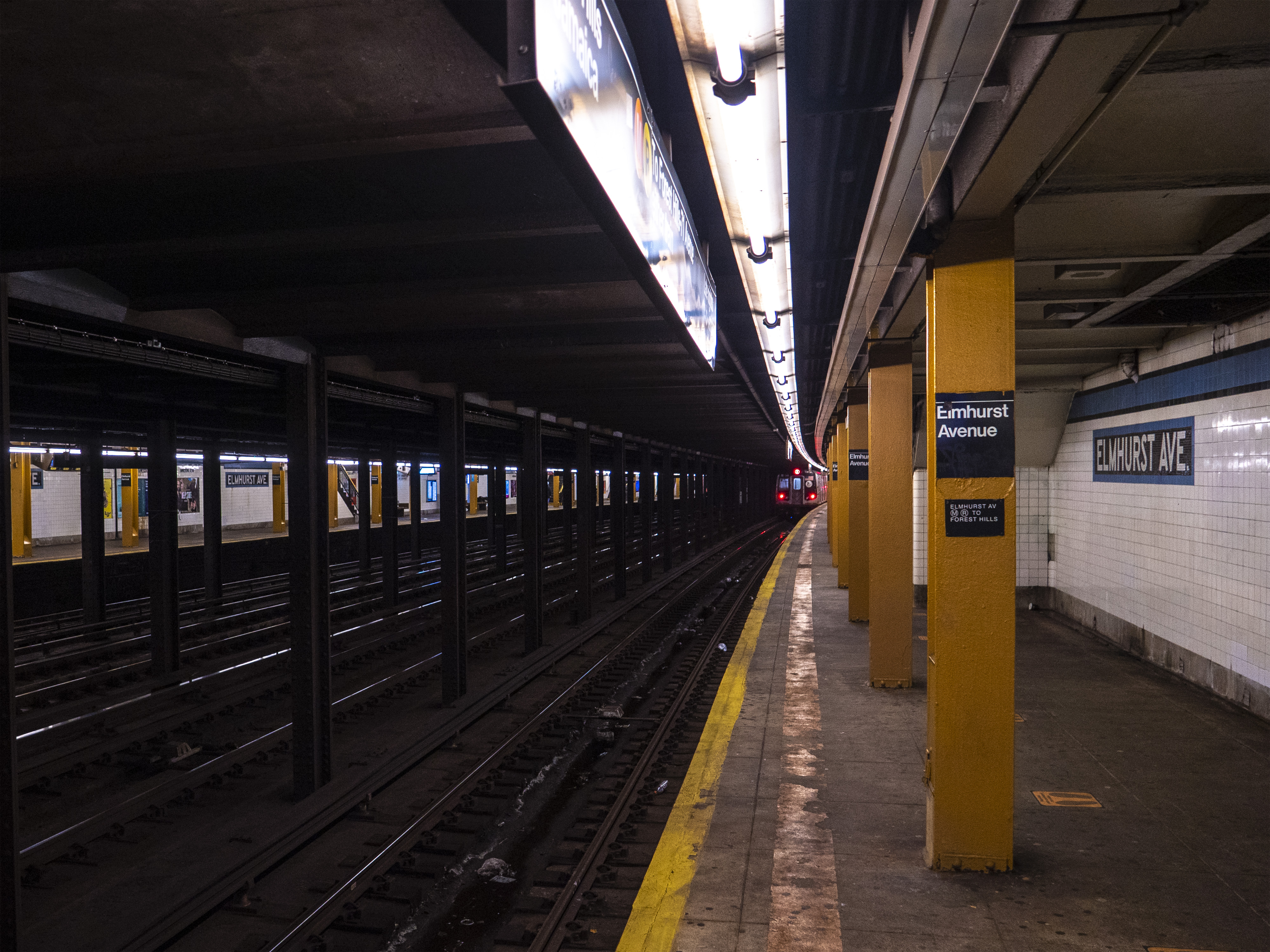
- R160 R train leaving the northbound platform

Station statistics
- Address: Elmhurst Avenue, 45th Avenue, & Broadway; Elmhurst, New York
- Borough: Queens
- Locale: Elmhurst
- Coordinates: 40.741795°N 73.88104°W
- Division: B (IND)
- Line: IND Queens Boulevard Line
- Services: E (late nights); F (late nights); M (weekdays during the day); R (all times except late nights)
- Transit: MTA Bus: Q53 SBS
- Structure: Underground
- Platforms: 2 side platforms
- Tracks: 4

Other information
- Opened: December 31, 1936; 89 years ago
- Accessible: No; planned

Traffic
- 2025: 3,222,424 ▲6.2%
- Rank: 118 out of 423
Services
Preceding station	New York City Subway	Following station
Jackson Heights–Roosevelt Avenue E F M R via 36th Street	Local	Grand Avenue–Newtown E F M R toward Forest Hills–71st Avenue
does not stop here
Location
Location within New York City Subway
Location within New York City
Location within New York
Track layout
Street map
Station service legend
Symbol	Description
Stops all times except late nights	Stops all times except late nights
Stops late nights only	Stops late nights only
Stops weekdays during the day	Stops weekdays during the day
- Elmhurst Avenue Subway Station (IND)
- U.S. National Register of Historic Places
- MPS: New York City Subway System MPS
- NRHP reference No.: 05000672
- Added to NRHP: July 6, 2005

The Elmhurst Avenue station is a local station on the IND Queens Boulevard Line of the New York City Subway. Located at the intersection of Elmhurst Avenue, 45th Avenue, and Broadway in Elmhurst, Queens, it is served by the M train on weekdays, and by the R train at all times except late nights, when the E and F trains take over service.

== History ==
=== Construction and opening ===
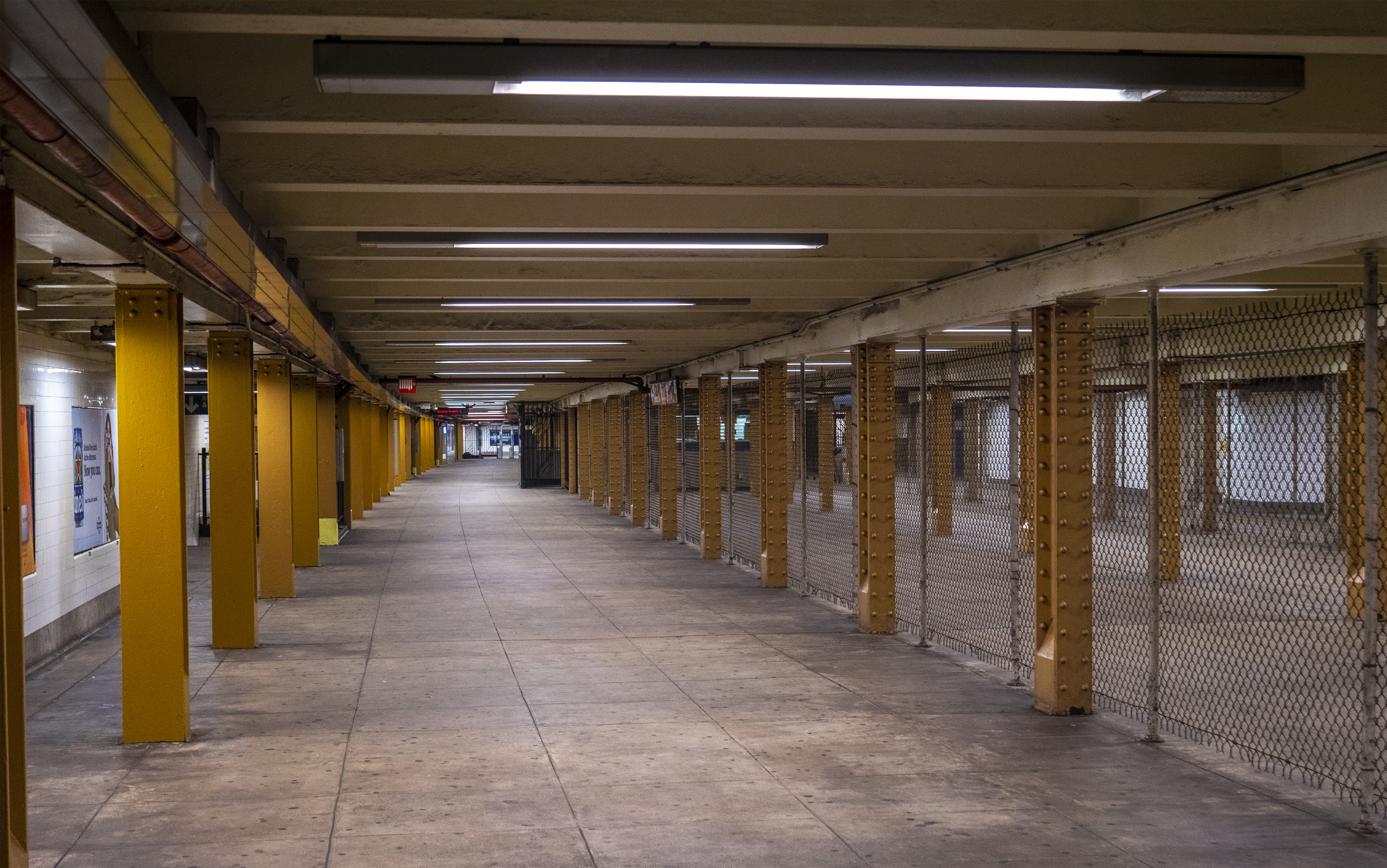
Mezzanine level

The Queens Boulevard Line was one of the first built by the city-owned Independent Subway System (IND), and was planned to stretch between the IND Eighth Avenue Line in Manhattan and 178th Street and Hillside Avenue in Jamaica, Queens, with a stop at Elmhurst Avenue. The line was first proposed in 1925. Construction of the line was approved by the New York City Board of Estimate on October 4, 1928. The line was constructed using the cut-and-cover tunneling method, and to allow pedestrians to cross, temporary bridges were built over the trenches.

The first section of the line opened on August 19, 1933 from the connection to the Eighth Avenue Line at 50th Street to Roosevelt Avenue in Jackson Heights. Later that year, a $23 million loan was approved to finance the remainder of the line, along with other IND lines. The remainder of the line was built by the Public Works Administration. In 1934 and 1935, construction of the extension to Jamaica was suspended for 15 months and was halted by strikes. Construction was further delayed due to a strike in 1935, instigated by electricians opposing wages paid by the General Railway Signal Company. The chief engineer of the Elmhurst Avenue station was Robert Ridgway and the design engineer was Aaron I. Raisman.

In August 1936, tracks were installed all the way to 178th Street, and the stations to Union Turnpike were completed. On December 31, 1936, the IND Queens Boulevard Line was extended by eight stops, and 3.5 miles (5.6 km), from its previous terminus at Roosevelt Avenue to Union Turnpike. The E train, which initially served all stops on the new extension, began making express stops in April 1937, and local GG trains began serving the extension at the time.

=== Later years ===
The opening of the Elmhurst Avenue station resulted in the development of Elmhurst as a commercial and residential neighborhood. This station was listed on the National Register of Historic Places on July 6, 2005, as structure number 05000672. As part of its 2025–2029 Capital Program, the MTA has proposed making the station wheelchair-accessible in compliance with the Americans with Disabilities Act of 1990.

== Station layout ==
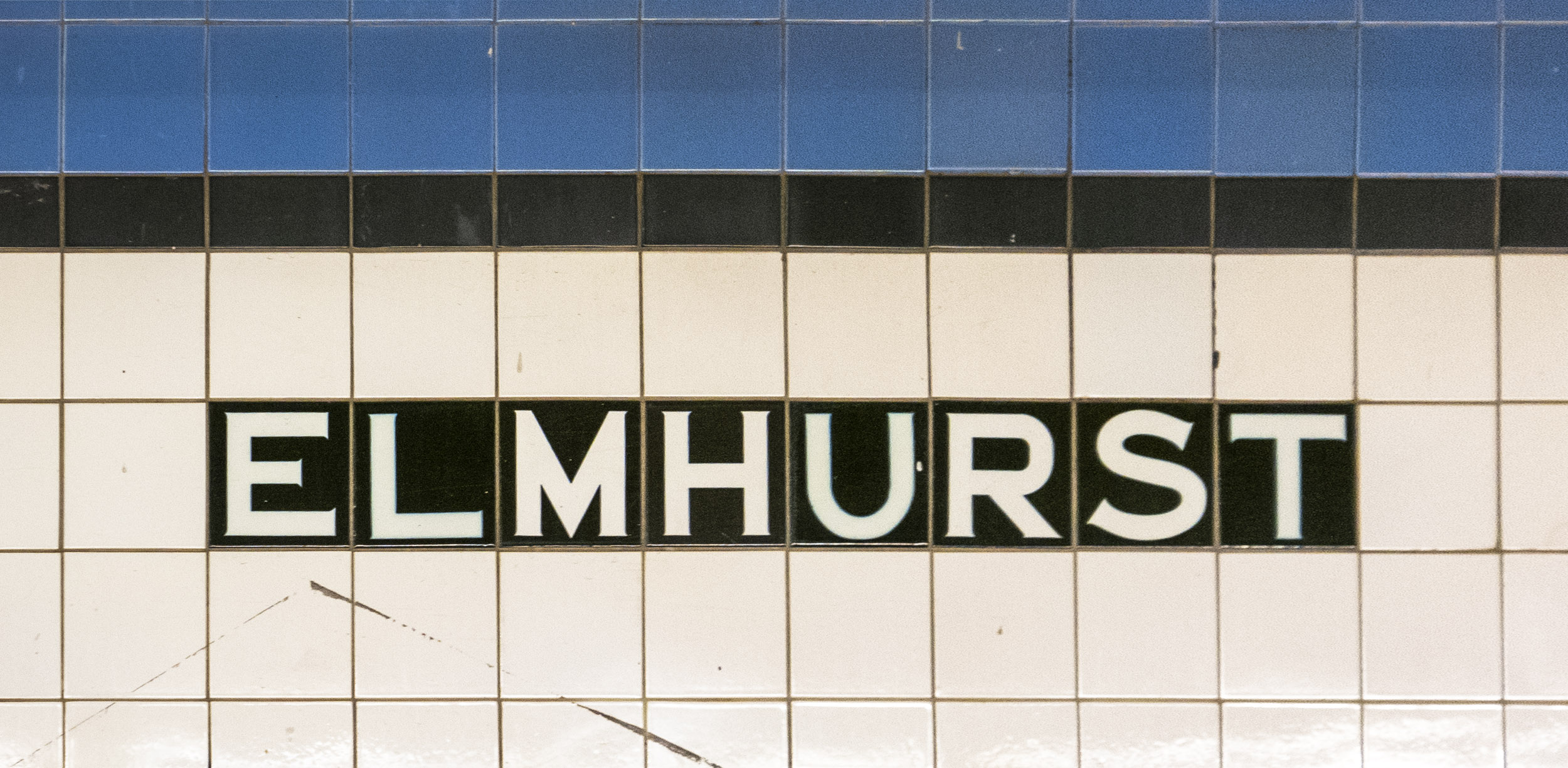
Tile caption below trim line

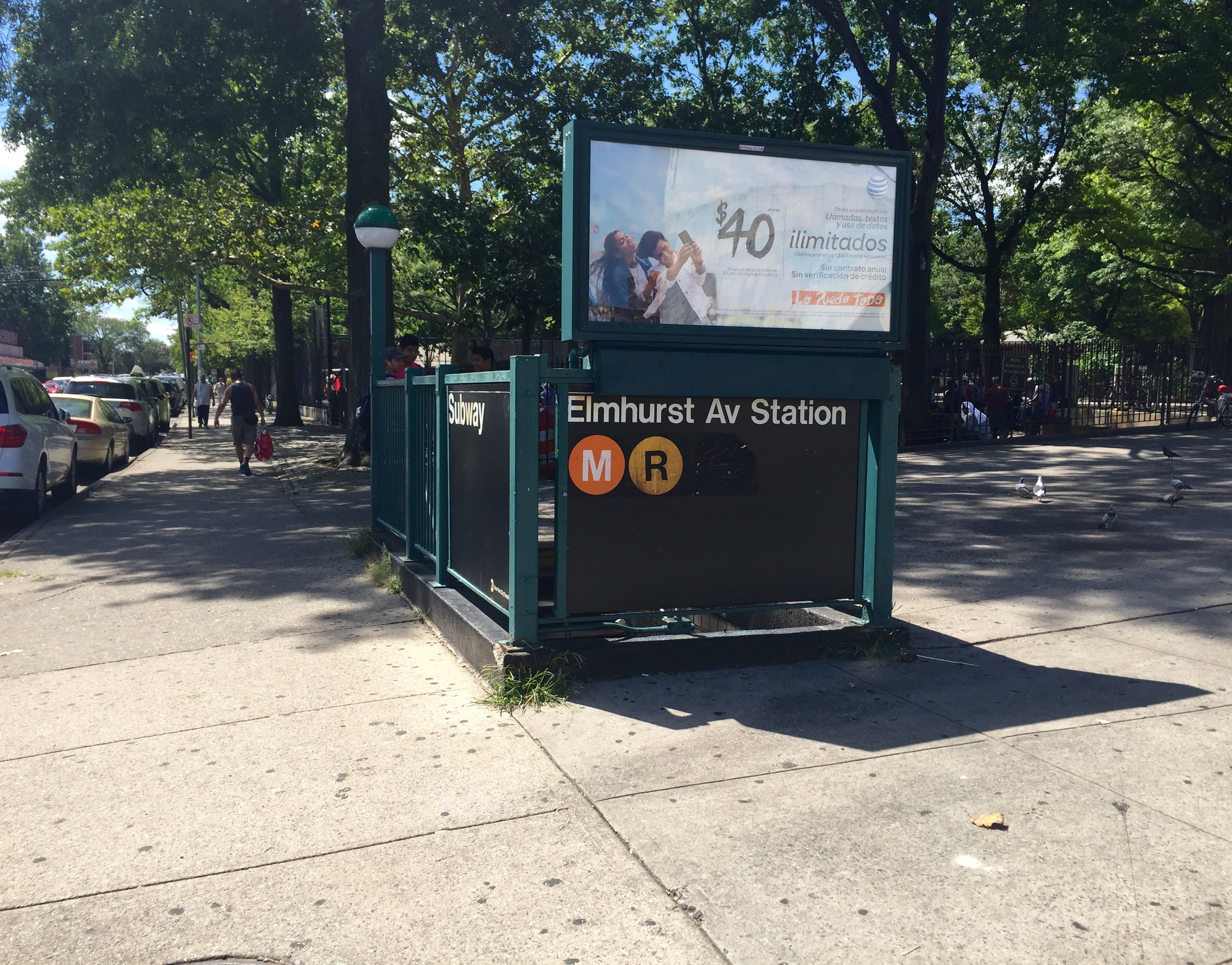
Southwestern (railroad north) street stair

There are four tracks and two side platforms; the two center express tracks are used by the E and F trains at all times except late nights. The E and F trains serve the station at night, the M train serves the station on weekdays during the day, and the R train serves the station at all times except late nights. The station is between Jackson Heights–Roosevelt Avenue to the west and Grand Avenue–Newtown to the east.

Both platform walls have a blue tile band on a black border with small "ELMHURST" tile captions in white lettering on a black background beneath them. They also have mosaic name tablets reading "ELMHURST AVE." in white sans-serif lettering on a black background and Cerulean blue border. The tile band was part of a color-coded tile system used throughout the IND. The tile colors were designed to facilitate navigation for travelers going away from Lower Manhattan. As such, the blue tiles used at the Elmhurst Avenue station are also used at Jackson Heights–Roosevelt Avenue, the next express station to the west, while a different tile color is used at Forest Hills–71st Avenue, the next express station to the east. Blue tiles are similarly used at the other local stations between Roosevelt Avenue and 71st Avenue. There are also advertising recesses between the tablets, as well as grates at the top of the platform wall.

The ceiling of the platform level is held up by yellow I-beam piers located every 15 feet (4.6 m), which support girders underneath the mezzanine that runs above the platform level. The roof girders are also connected to columns in the platform walls.

The tunnel is covered by a U-shaped trough that contains utility pipes and wires. The outer walls of this trough are composed of columns, spaced approximately every 5 feet (1.5 m) with concrete infill between them. There is a 1-inch (25 mm) gap between the tunnel wall and the platform wall, which is made of 4-inch (100 mm)-thick brick covered over by a tiled finish. The columns between the tracks are also spaced every 5 feet (1.5 m), with no infill.

This station has a full-length mezzanine above the platforms and tracks supported by yellow I-beam columns located every 15 feet (4.6 m). It is separated into three sections by two chain-link fences, which separate the paid areas along the outer walls from the unpaid area in the center of the station. However, underneath the westernmost staircase of the station, there is a passageway that connects the mezzanines from each direction, allowing free transfers between directions. The token booth is at the center in the middle section outside fare control with a small turnstile bank to either outer section. Each platform has seven staircases going up to the mezzanine.

=== Exits ===
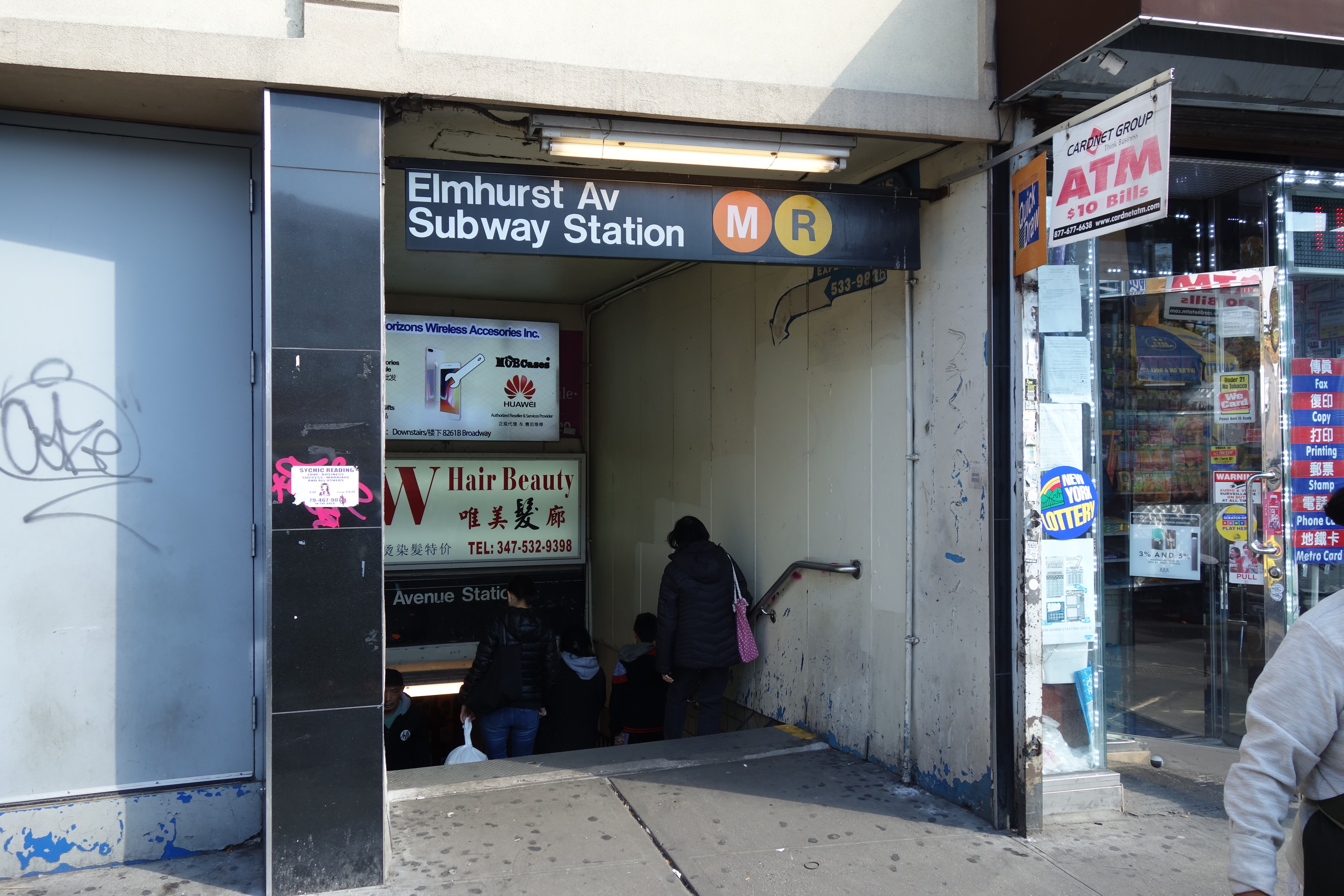
Elmhurst Avenue exit at 82-55 Broadway

There are five entrances to the station in total, two on the northwestern end of the mezzanine and three on the southeastern end.

The staircases to the street are at either end of the mezzanine. On the northwest (railroad south) side, one staircase goes up to the southwest corner of 82nd Street and Broadway while another goes up to the southwest corner of Britton Avenue and Broadway. At this end, there are two exit-only turnstiles from the Forest Hills-bound side of the mezzanine and two High Entry-Exit Turnstiles from the Manhattan-bound side.

On the southeast (railroad north) side of the mezzanine, there are two staircases going up to either southern corner of 45th Avenue and Broadway. Another goes up to the northwest corner of Elmhurst Avenue and Broadway, which is built within a store front and goes through a small underground shopping arcade. On this side, there are two exit-only turnstiles and one High Entry-Exit Turnstile from the Forest Hills-bound side and two High Entry-Exit Turnstiles from the Manhattan-bound side.

=== Nearby infrastructure ===
The Elmhurst station on the Long Island Rail Road's Port Washington Branch was about one block to the south of this station before it closed in 1985.

Between this station and Jackson Heights–Roosevelt Avenue, ramps ascend from the local tracks, merging with the tunnels coming from the Roosevelt Avenue station's unused upper-level terminal.

== See also ==
- National Register of Historic Places listings in Queens, New York
