= Rockaway Park =

Neighborhood in New York City

- Neighborhood of Queens
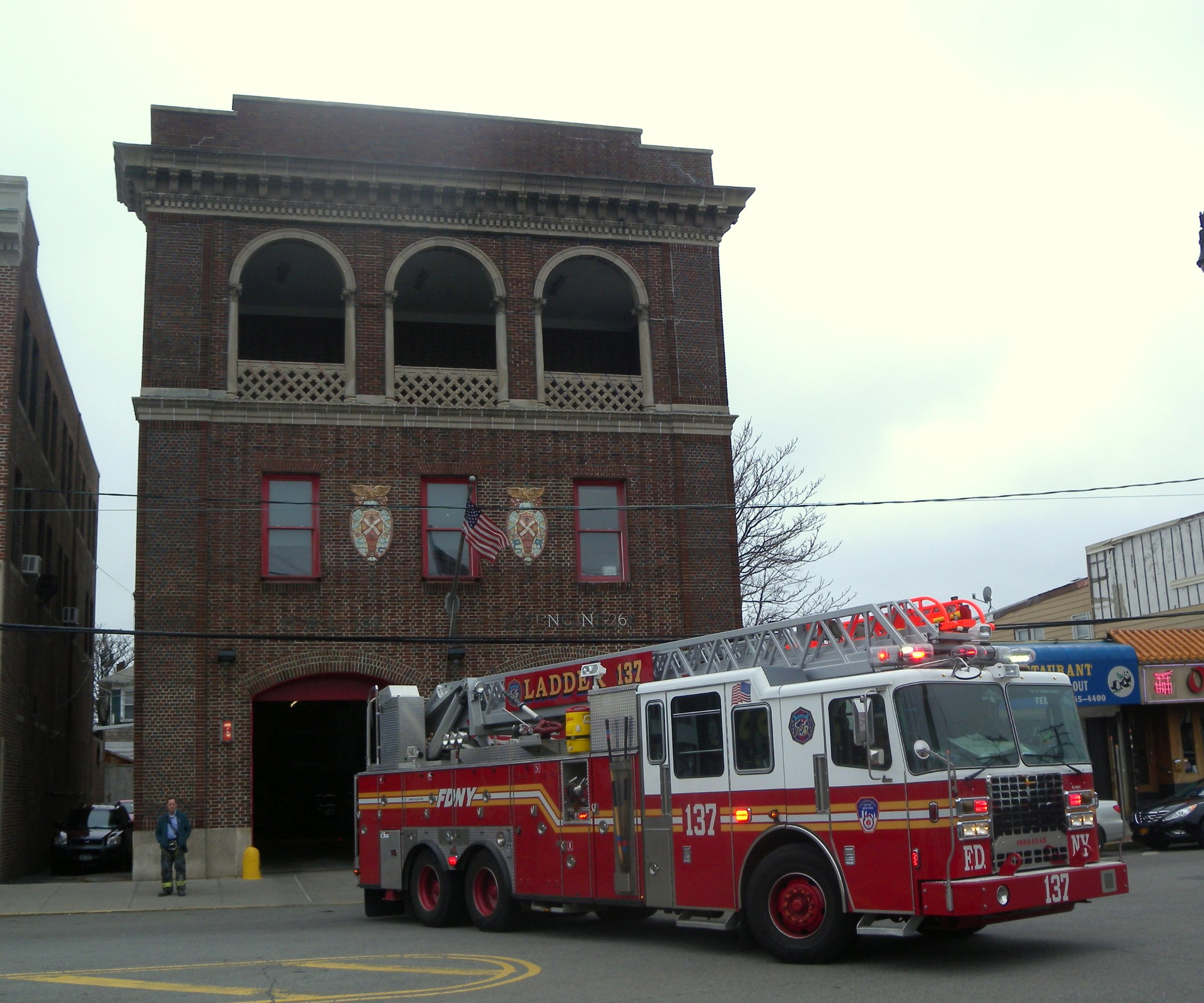
- Local fire station
- Location within New York City
- Coordinates: 40.579°N 73.841°W
- Country: United States
- State: New York
- City: New York City
- County/Borough: Queens
- Community District: Queens 14
- Time zone: UTC−5 (EST)
  - Summer (DST): UTC−4 (EDT)
- ZIP Code: 11694
- Area codes: 718, 347, 929, and 917

Rockaway Park is a neighborhood in the New York City borough of Queens. The area is on the Rockaway Peninsula, nestled between Jamaica Bay to the north and the Atlantic Ocean to the south. The neighborhood of Rockaway Beach lies on its eastern border while the community of Belle Harbor is situated on its western side. The neighborhood is part of Queens Community Board 14.

== Character ==
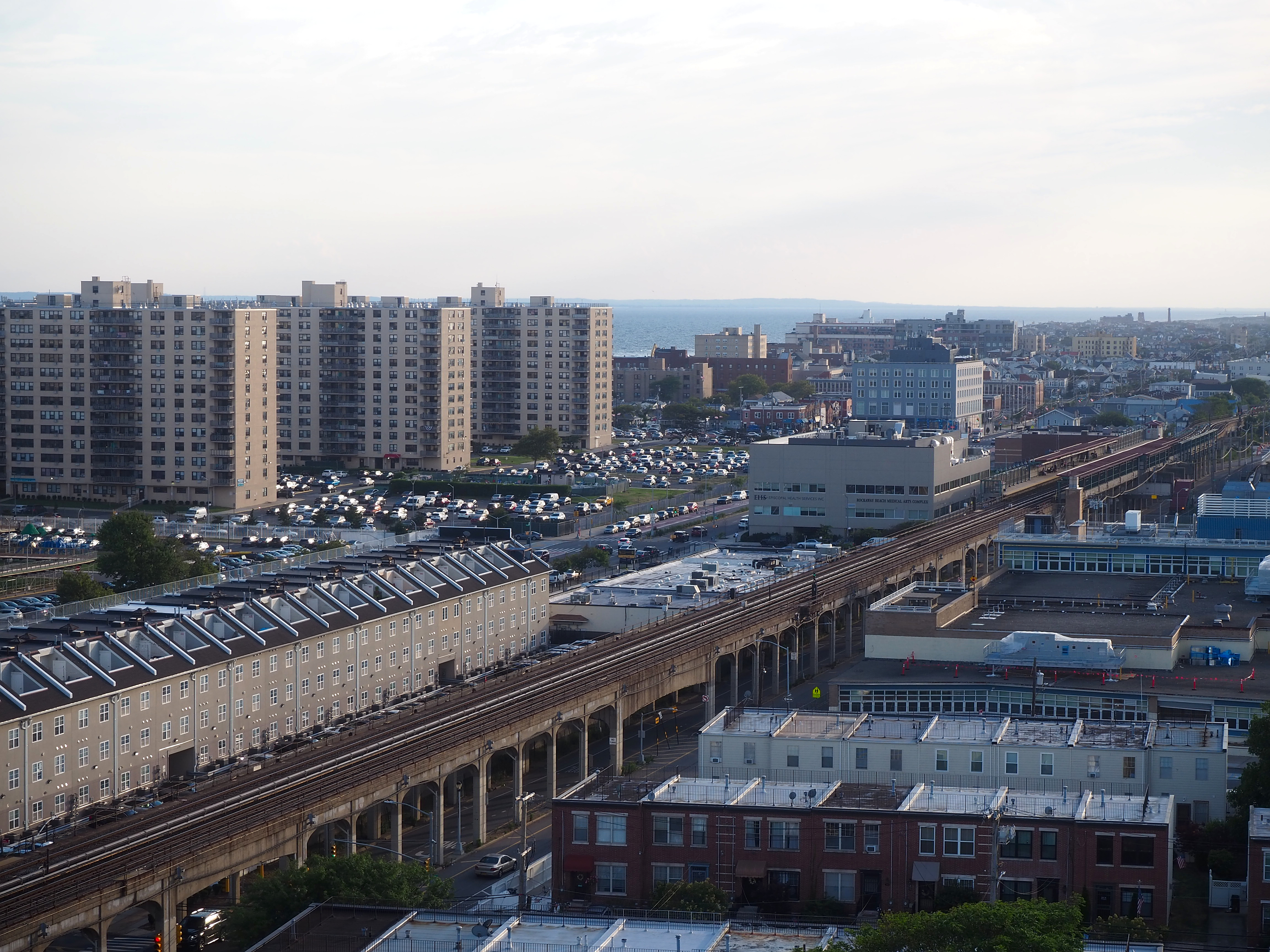

The heavily Irish Rockaway Park has been called the "Irish Riviera". The 2000 United States census showed that 36.0% of the population were of Irish ancestry in the ZCTA for ZIP Code 11694. The Saint Patrick's Day parade in Rockaway is the second-largest St. Patrick's Day Parade in New York City, second only to New York City's Saint Patrick's Day Parade up Fifth Avenue in Manhattan.

The neighborhood is centered around Beach 116th Street, a two-block street that runs from Beach Channel Drive southward to Ocean Promenade. At the street's northern end is Tribute Park, which has a memorial to the 343 firefighters killed in the September 11 attacks, and at its southern tip is a memorial to the 265 victims of American Airlines Flight 587, which crashed nearby in Belle Harbor on November 12, 2001.

== Transportation ==
The New York City Subway's A and S trains serve the Rockaway Park–Beach 116th Street station, the terminus of the IND Rockaway Line and its associated services.

The area is served by bus routes operated by MTA Bus Company. The Q22 bus runs along the Rockaway Peninsula from Beach 116th Street to Mott Avenue. The Q53 SBS runs from Beach 116th Street, over the Cross Bay Bridge via Cross Bay Boulevard to Woodside, and Woodside LIRR station and 61st Street subway station. The Q35 runs from Beach 108th Street to the Flatbush Avenue–Brooklyn College subway station, and the Brooklyn College, in Brooklyn via the Marine Parkway-Gil Hodges Memorial Bridge and Flatbush Avenue. It goes through Belle Harbor, Neponsit, and Jacob Riis Park on the Rockaway Peninsula. Express service to Manhattan is also provided by the QM16 bus to/from Riis Park.

In the aftermath of Hurricane Sandy on October 29, 2012, which caused massive infrastructure damage to the A train south of the station at Howard Beach–JFK Airport, ferry operator SeaStreak began running a city-subsidized ferry service between a makeshift ferry slip at Beach 108th Street and Beach Channel Drive in Rockaway Park and Pier 11/Wall Street in Manhattan's Financial District, then continuing on to the East 34th Street Ferry Landing. In August 2013, a stop was added at Brooklyn Army Terminal. The service was extended multiple times, finally ending on October 31, 2014. On May 1, 2017, NYC Ferry's Rockaway route started operations between Pier 11/Wall Street in Manhattan's Financial District and Beach 108th Street in Rockaway Park, with a stop at Brooklyn Army Terminal.
