= Woodhaven and Cross Bay Boulevards =

Boulevard in Queens, New York

- Jamaica Bay Boulevard (former)
- Map of Queens with Woodhaven and Cross Bay Boulevards highlighted in red

Route information
- Maintained by NYCDOT NYSDOT & MTAB&T
- Length: 11.1 mi (17.9 km)
- Restrictions: No drivers with learner's permits on Cross Bay Veterans Memorial Bridge

Major junctions
- South end: Shore Front Parkway in Rockaway Beach
- Belt Parkway in Howard Beach; NY 27 in Howard Beach
- North end: I-495 / NY 25 in Elmhurst

Location
- Country: United States
- State: New York
- Counties: Queens

Highway system
- New York Highways; Interstate; US; State; Reference; Parkways

Woodhaven Boulevard and Cross Bay Boulevard (formerly Jamaica Bay Boulevard) are two parts of a major boulevard in the New York City borough of Queens. Woodhaven Boulevard runs roughly north–south in the central portion of Queens. South of Liberty Avenue, it is known as Cross Bay Boulevard, which is the main north–south road in Howard Beach. The completion of the boulevard in 1923, together with the construction of the associated bridges over Jamaica Bay, created the first direct roadway connection to the burgeoning Atlantic Ocean beachfront communities of the Rockaway Peninsula from Brooklyn and most of Queens.

The road is part of the New York City Arterial System, having formerly been given the unsigned reference route designation of New York State Route 908V (NY 908V). However, the reference route has not been listed in NYSDOT documents since April 2005, and is maintained by the New York City Department of Transportation. The southernmost 0.4 miles (0.64 km) of the route on the Rockaway peninsula, locally known as Cross Bay Parkway, is designated but not signed as New York State Route 907J (NY 907J).

== Route description ==
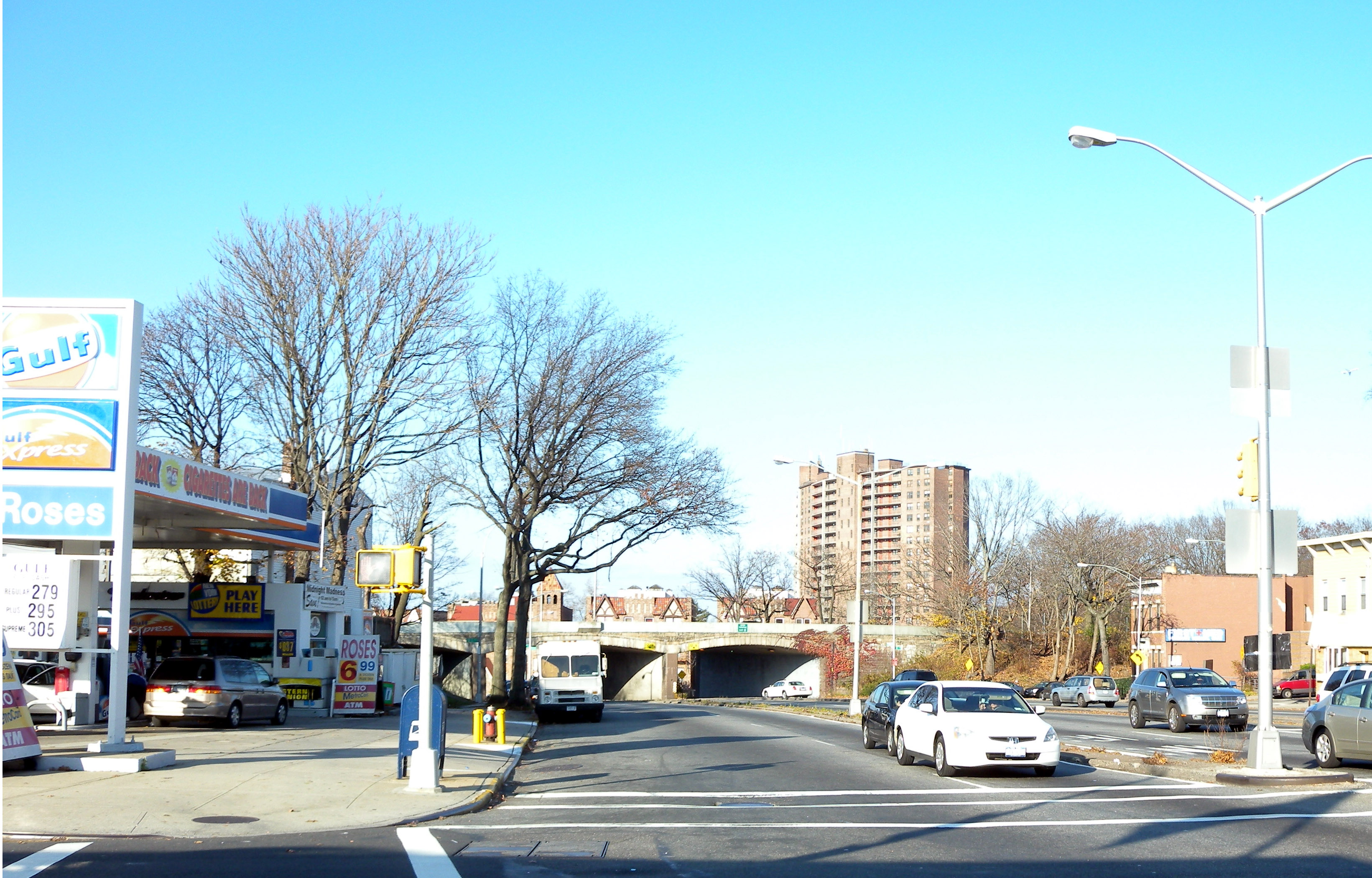
At Myrtle Avenue

Beginning at the intersection with Queens Boulevard near the Queens Center shopping mall in Elmhurst, the boulevard runs generally south through the neighborhoods of Elmhurst, Rego Park, Middle Village, Glendale, Woodhaven (for which it is named), and Ozone Park. At the intersection with Liberty Avenue in Ozone Park, the name of the street changes to Cross Bay Boulevard. It continues south through Ozone Park, Howard Beach and across Jamaica Bay via the Joseph P. Addabbo Memorial Bridge through Broad Channel, before finally coming to an end at Rockaway Beach in The Rockaways, after crossing over the Cross Bay Bridge.

Since Cross Bay Boulevard is a direct continuation of Woodhaven Boulevard, it is a large street, although not as wide. It is a six-lane wide, median-divided boulevard throughout the majority of its stretch (although it shrinks to four lanes once it reaches Broad Channel). Cross Bay Boulevard is the only direct connection between the Rockaways, Broad Channel, and the rest of Queens. Cross Bay Boulevard is approximately 7 miles (11 km) long. Together with Woodhaven Boulevard, which is 4 miles (6.4 km) long, makes it one of the longest streets in Queens, at 11 miles (18 km).

Woodhaven Boulevard is an 8- to 11-lane boulevard throughout its entire length, stretching up to 195 feet (59 m) in width, making it the widest street in Queens that is not either a limited-access highway or a state route. The only street in Queens that isn't a highway to surpass it in width is Queens Boulevard (NY 25) at 225 feet (69 m).

Formerly, Woodhaven Boulevard (through Glendale, Woodhaven, and Ozone Park) had up to six central lanes and four service lanes (10 bi-directional), resembling many other major thoroughfares in the New York City boroughs outside Manhattan, such as Queens Boulevard in Queens; Ocean Parkway, Linden Boulevard, Kings Highway, and Eastern Parkway in Brooklyn; and Bruckner Boulevard, Pelham Parkway, and Grand Concourse in the Bronx. However, these service roads were removed in September 2017. It is also the only Queens roadway with its own distinct FIRE LANE markings, similar to those found on Manhattan's north–south avenues. As of September 2017, Woodhaven Boulevard contains dedicated bus lanes along most of its length, while Cross Bay Boulevard does not.

== History ==
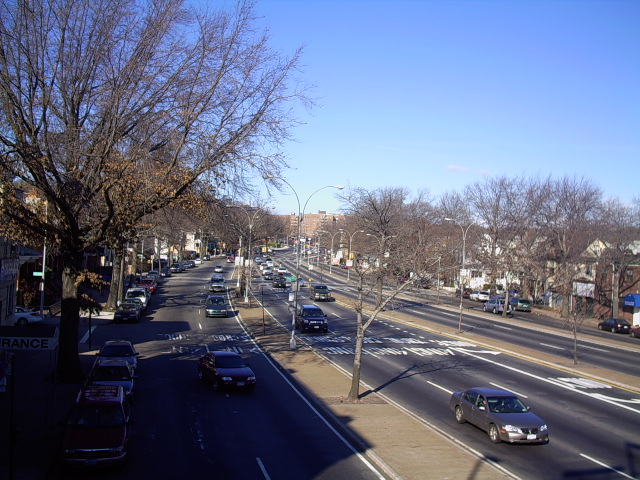
The boulevard in Woodhaven as seen from Woodhaven Boulevard station (J and Z trains)

Woodhaven and Cross Bay Boulevards was originally laid out as South Meadow Road in 1668. It originated at the intersection of present-day Queens Boulevard and Grand Avenue, and went as far south as Jamaica Bay. Around the 1850s, South Meadow Road was renamed Trotting Course Lane, after the number of trotting courses and horse racetracks found in Woodhaven, halfway along the road's route. Part of the original Trotting Course Lane still exists near Metropolitan Avenue. In 1889, the road was renamed Flushing Avenue. By the time Queens became part of New York City in 1896, Flushing Avenue had been renamed yet again because the name was shared by another road a few miles away. The road was now named Woodhaven Avenue, after the neighboring community. Shortly afterward, Woodhaven Avenue was straightened in the vicinity of Metropolitan Avenue, resulting in the present-day Trotting Course Lane.

The transition from Woodhaven to Cross Bay Boulevard in Ozone Park as seen from Rockaway Boulevard station

Cross Bay Boulevard dates from Patrick Flynn's 1899 proposal to build a road across Jamaica Bay. The crossing, which would be 80 feet (24 m) wide, would contain a double-track trolley line, a bicycle path, and roadway. Flynn's project aimed at connecting the Jamaica Bay islands, filling in the marshes and leasing properties for homes along the route. The Long Island Rail Road, whose Rockaway Beach Branch trestles were the only transportation connection across the bay at the time, vigorously opposed Flynn's plans in an effort to protect its monopoly. In June 1902, the New York Court of Appeals invalidated the 1892 lease that Flynn's project was based on. The only work that had been performed was a flattening of a plateau south from Liberty Avenue to a point 1,500 feet (460 m) from the bay's northern shore.

In the late 1910s, plans surfaced again to build Cross Bay Boulevard between Woodhaven and the Rockaways. Advocates stated that the construction of the boulevard would result in development in the Rockaways. In September 1918, the New York City Board of Estimate approved plans for Cross Bay Boulevard. A $2.9 million bid for the boulevard's construction was received in October 1921. Work involved the paving of Cross Bay Boulevard with concrete and asphalt; widening the thruway from 50 feet to 100 ft (30 m); and connecting the Rockaways, Broad Channel, and mainland portions as part of what was described as "the largest vehicular trestle in the world". The project encountered difficulties, including the presence of oyster beds in the boulevard's path, which had to be removed before construction could proceed. The boulevard was then referred to as Jamaica Bay Boulevard. The southern portion between Broad Channel and Rockaway Beach opened in October 1924, and the entire route up to the existing intersection of Woodhaven Avenue and Liberty Avenue opened a year later in 1925. The new boulevard used much of Flynn's original right-of-way, but the causeway across Jamaica Bay connected to mainland Queens east of the location of Flynn's plateau. In conjunction with this extension, Woodhaven Avenue was widened to 150 feet (46 m) and renamed Woodhaven Boulevard.

Woodhaven Boulevard's northern end at Queens Boulevard was originally Slattery Plaza, where the two major thruways originally intersected with Eliot Avenue and Horace Harding Boulevard. The intersection, along with the Woodhaven Boulevard subway station, was named after Colonel John R. Slattery, former Transportation Board chief engineer who died in 1932 while supervising the construction of the Independent Subway System's Eighth Avenue Line.

The original Jamaica bridge was intended to sufficiently handle traffic for many years, but by 1929 it was already becoming overly congested. The bridge was replaced with a newer, low-level bascule bridge in the same location that was opened on June 3, 1939, at a cost of $33 million (equivalent to $399 million in 2025). It consisted of a widened version of the previous drawbridge, and a grade-separated interchange complex feeding into Beach Channel Drive and the Cross Bay Parkway. The Cross Bay Parkway was extended south along Beach 94th Street and Beach 95th Street to the Shore Front Parkway along Rockaway Beach. Following its completion, Harry Taylor, head of the New York City Parkway Authority, said it had "transformed the old-time beach resort of blighted shacks, cheap amusements and limited play space into a modern playground of the type and character of Jones Beach."

A 1941 proposal would have created an expressway along the route of Cross Bay and Woodhaven Boulevards, connecting Queens Boulevard to the Rockaways. The construction of the Long Island Expressway along the Horace Harding corridor caused Slattery Plaza to be demolished.

The Jamaica Bay bridge was reconstructed at a cost of $26 million (equivalent to $166 million in 2025) and opened to traffic on May 28, 1970. The current bridge is a high-level fixed bridge carrying six traffic lanes and a sidewalk on the west side. The bridge was built 55 feet (17 m) high in order to allow boats pass under without the delays caused by the previous drawbridge. The bridge is operated by the Triborough Bridge and Tunnel Authority, an affiliate agency of the Metropolitan Transportation Authority.

The Joseph P. Addabbo Memorial Bridge was built to replace the original North Channel Bridge in 1993, a lack of maintenance on the old bascule bridge had allowed it to deteriorate to the point where it was beyond repair.

Once heavily German and Irish, the area is now very ethnically diverse. The headquarters of the St. Patrick's Day Parade Committee is located on Woodhaven Boulevard (see also Irish Americans in New York City).

The first dedicated MTA bus lanes on the corridor were installed in August 2015, on the north end of Woodhaven Boulevard between Dry Harbor Road and Metropolitan Avenue. In September 2017, the NYCDOT announced that the segment of Woodhaven Boulevard between Union Turnpike and 81st Road would also get dedicated bus lanes for Select Bus Service. As part of that segment's bus lane implementation, the NYCDOT would remove the medians separating service-road and main-road traffic in each direction, as well as expand the median separating the two directions of traffic.

The bus stops at Liberty Avenue, 91st Avenue, and Jamaica Avenue have art installations on their railings that relate to local history.

== Transportation ==
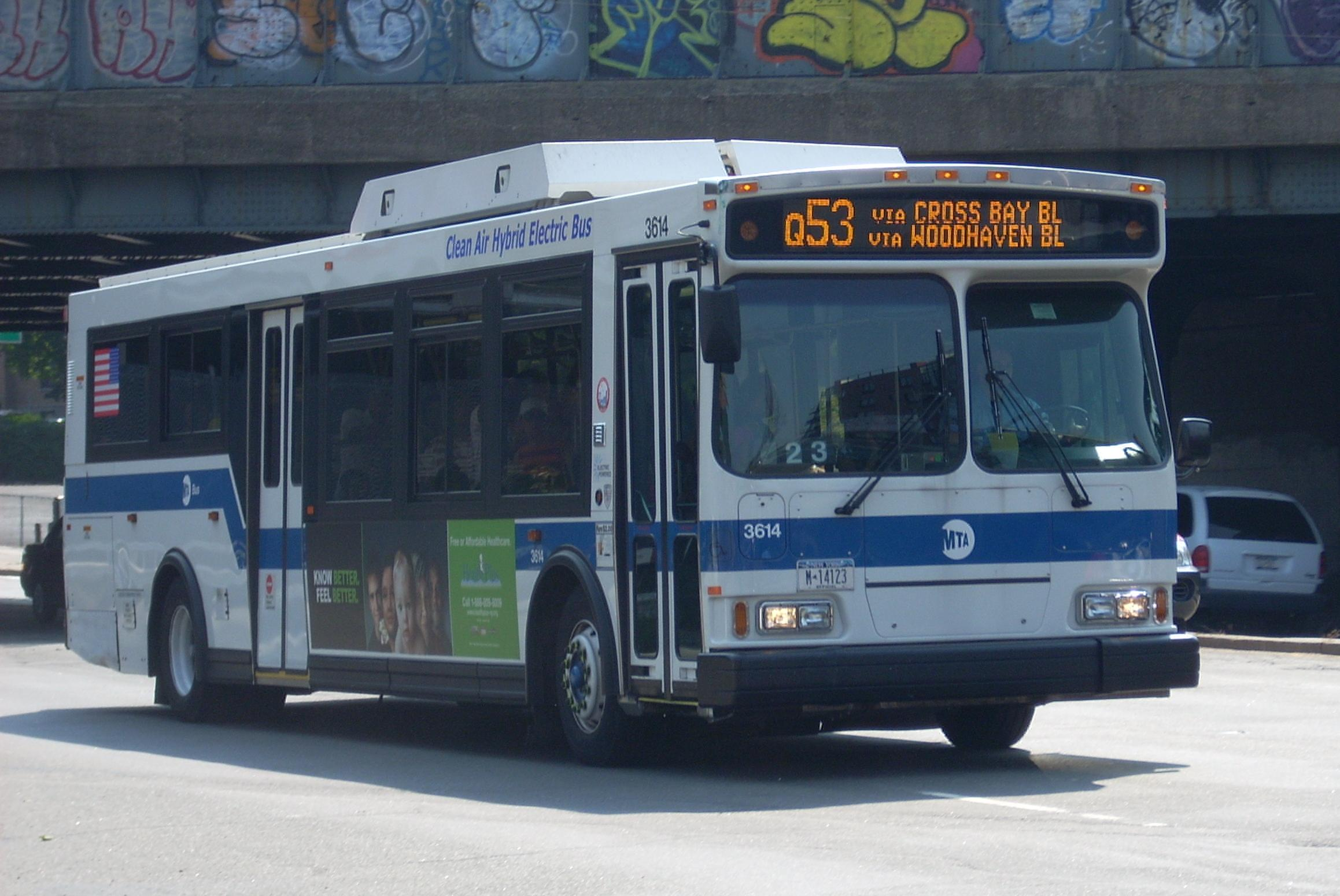
A Q53 bus near the northern end of Woodhaven Bouelvard

The corridor is served by the following:

- The Q52 and Q53 provide Select Bus Service along the entire corridor, making all stops in Broad Channel. At the southern end, the Q52 heads east to serve Edgemere and the Q53 west to serve Rockaway Park, both in the Rockaway Peninsula.
  - Northbound, the Q52 terminates at Queens Center Mall on Queens Boulevard in Elmhurst, the corridor’s northern end, while the Q53 continues via Queens Boulevard and Broadway to Woodside, at the 61st Street subway and Woodside LIRR stations.
- The Q41 shares the same service with the Q21 in the Cross Bay Boulevard section, which ends at Liberty Avenue (northbound). It then heads east on Rockaway Boulevard, providing service to Jamaica.
- The Q11 provides local service between the northern end and Pitkin Avenue in Ozone Park, with most daytime buses heading east to serve Old Howard Beach and Hamilton Beach. Some trips end at Howard Beach. All buses that terminate at Pitkin Avenue use Redding Street. Buses also serve the neighborhood of Lindenwood.
  - The Q11 route, which originally corresponded to both portions of the boulevard respectively, dates back to the 1930s when it was among 54 bus routes approved by the Board of Estimate for operation. It terminates at Queens Center Mall northbound.
- Express bus service along the corridor is provided by the QM15, QM16, QM17, and BM5 buses. Southbound, the QM15 makes stops first, followed by the BM5 south of 63rd Drive. It leaves the corridor at North Conduit Avenue to serve Spring Creek, followed by the QM15 at 153rd Avenue to serve Lindenwood. Both services to Manhattan start at South Conduit Avenue. Some QM15 trips continue down to Arverne. Meanwhile, the QM16 and QM17 continue down the corridor, and don’t make any stops until 159th Avenue. At the southern end, the QM16 heads west for Jacob Riis Park, and the QM17 east for Far Rockaway. All express buses use the Long Island Expressway, located near Queens Center Mall, to get to/from Midtown.
- The Woodhaven Boulevard station on the IND Queens Boulevard Line is served by the R during the day, the M weekdays, and the E and F late nights.
- The Woodhaven Boulevard station on the BMT Jamaica Line) is served by the J at all times and the Z rush hours.
- The Rockaway Boulevard station on the IND Fulton Street Line is located at the intersection of Rockaway Boulevard, Cross Bay Boulevard, and Liberty Avenue, and is served by the A at all times.

To the east of the boulevard lies the abandoned Rockaway Beach Branch formerly operated by the Long Island Rail Road, which parallels the boulevard for most of its route between Rego Park and the Rockaways. Both the Rockaway line and the boulevard represent the Woodhaven-Cross Bay Boulevard transit corridor. The rail line north of Liberty Avenue was closed in 1962, replaced by the Q53 which until 2006 ran non-stop between Rego Park and Broad Channel, with the Q11 and Q21 providing local service on the Woodhaven and Cross Bay portions of the route respectively. The entire line has been planned to be converted for subway service going back to the 1920s blueprints of the Independent Subway System (IND); the portion south of Liberty Avenue was converted into the IND Rockaway Line in 1956, while the northern portion remains inactive. Some local mass transit advocates have urged that the northern portion be refurbished and reopened as a faster rail link between Queens and Manhattan. A Select Bus Service bus rapid transit corridor is planned along the corridor, which would attempt to replicate rapid transit service with the current Q52 and Q53 routes. The plan has received mixed reviews, due to the addition of bus-only lanes which could negatively affect traffic flow.

== In popular culture ==
Cross Bay Boulevard was mentioned in The Vaccines' song "Nørgaard" about Danish model Amanda Nørgaard.

== Major intersections ==
The entire route is in the New York City borough of Queens.

Location	mi	km	Destinations	Notes
Rockaway Beach	0.0	0.0	Shore Front Parkway	Southern terminus
Rockaway Beach	0.2	0.32	Rockaway Beach Boulevard	
Rockaway Beach	0.3	0.48	Rockaway Freeway	
Rockaway Beach	0.4	0.64	Far Rockaway, Riis Park	Interchange; access via Beach Channel Drive; last northbound exit before toll
Jamaica Bay	0.4– 1.1	0.64– 1.8	Cross Bay Veterans Memorial Bridge	
Jamaica Bay	4.0– 4.6	6.4– 7.4	Joseph P. Addabbo Memorial Bridge	
Howard Beach	5.9	9.5	Belt Parkway – Eastern Long Island, Verrazzano Bridge	Exits 17S-N on Belt Parkway; former NY 27A
Howard Beach	6.2	10.0	NY 27 (Conduit Avenue) to NY 878 east (Nassau Expressway) – Kennedy Airport	Interchange
Ozone Park	7.0	11.3	Transition between Cross Bay and Woodhaven Boulevards	
Ozone Park	7.0	11.3	Rockaway Boulevard – Aqueduct	Former NY 27A
Woodhaven	7.6	12.2	Atlantic Avenue	Interchange
Woodhaven	8.0	12.9	Jamaica Avenue	Right turns from service roads only
Glendale	8.6	13.8	Myrtle Avenue	
Glendale	8.9	14.3	Union Turnpike	
Glendale	9.4	15.1	Metropolitan Avenue	
Elmhurst	11.0	17.7	I-495 west (Long Island Expressway) – Midtown Tunnel	Exit 19 on I-495
Elmhurst	11.1	17.9	I-495 east (Long Island Expressway) / NY 25 (Queens Boulevard) – Eastern Long Island	Northern terminus
1.000 mi = 1.609 km; 1.000 km = 0.621 mi: Electronic toll collection; Incomplete access; Route transition

== See also ==
- King of Queens
- List of reference routes in New York
