= Broad Channel, Queens =

Neighborhood in New York City

Coordinates: 40.605°N 73.820°W

Broad Channel
- Neighborhood of Queens
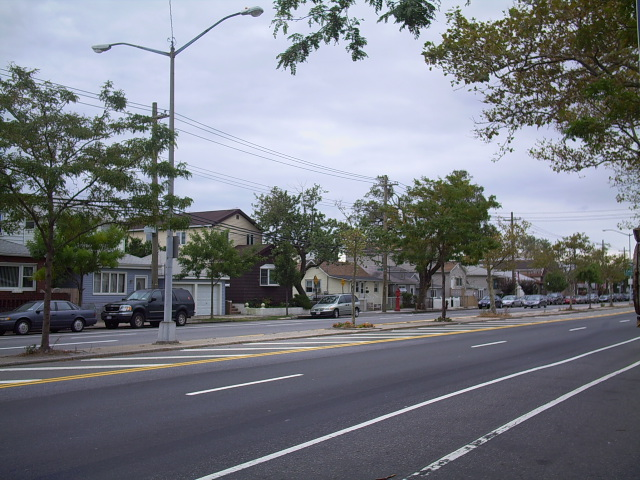
- Cross Bay Boulevard
- Interactive map of Broad Channel
- Country: United States
- State: New York
- City: New York City
- County/Borough: Queens
- Community District: Queens 14

Population (2020)
  - Total: 2,370
- Time zone: UTC−5 (EST)
  - Summer (DST): UTC−4 (EDT)
- ZIP Code: 11693
- Area codes: 718, 347, 929, and 917

Broad Channel is a neighborhood in the southern portion of the New York City borough of Queens. It occupies Rulers Bar Hassock, the only inhabited island in Jamaica Bay.

The neighborhood stands on Big Egg Marsh, an area of fill approximately 20 blocks long and 4 blocks wide at the south end of Rulers Bar Hassock. The community is an inholding within the Jamaica Bay Wildlife Refuge, managed by the U.S. National Park Service as part of the Gateway National Recreation Area. The area comprises several artificial canals separating dead-end residential blocks. It is connected to the rest of Queens by road and subway bridges.

Broad Channel is located in Queens Community District 14 and its ZIP Code is 11693. Broad Channel is one of the New York City neighborhoods most vulnerable to flooding. It is patrolled by the New York City Police Department's 100th Precinct.

== History ==
=== Early settlement ===
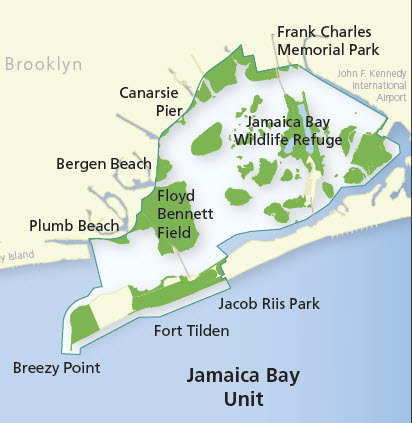
A map of the Jamaica Bay Unit of Gateway National Recreation Area. The Broad Channel community is depicted in yellow on the largest island located within the Jamaica Bay Wildlife Refuge section.

Prior to European settlement, the Jameco and Canarsie bands of Lenape Native Americans frequented this area. During the 17th century, Dutch settlers established a community on the island and began harvesting oysters, clams, shrimp, and fish. The name Hassock refers to firmer clumps of grass or vegetation in marshy ground. The name "Broad Channel" itself originally referred to a channel in Jamaica Bay, within which the island is located.

Until the American Civil War, most of Jamaica Bay's islands east of Bergen Island and Barren Island were not inhabited, including Broad Channel. The boundary line between the towns of Flatlands, Brooklyn, and Jamaica, Queens, ran through Jamaica Bay, cutting through Broad Channel, though the island was mostly part of Jamaica. After 1865, fisheries were developed in the bay, and by the late 1870s, the town of Jamaica indicated that structures had been built in the bay without the town's permission.

The Long Island Rail Road built its Rockaway Beach Branch across the bay in 1880, cutting through Broad Channel. The presence of the railroad led to the development of fishing villages with shacks, summer homes, boathouses, and stores. As part of the project, some other islands in Jamaica Bay were removed or connected to others.

Broad Channel remained a parcel within the town of Jamaica until the City of Greater New York was created in 1898. The northern (and larger) portion of the island is part of Gateway National Recreation Area and is managed as part of the Jamaica Bay Wildlife Refuge, the only wildlife refuge managed the National Park Service. The waters and marsh islands of the refuge entirely surround the community.

=== 20th century ===
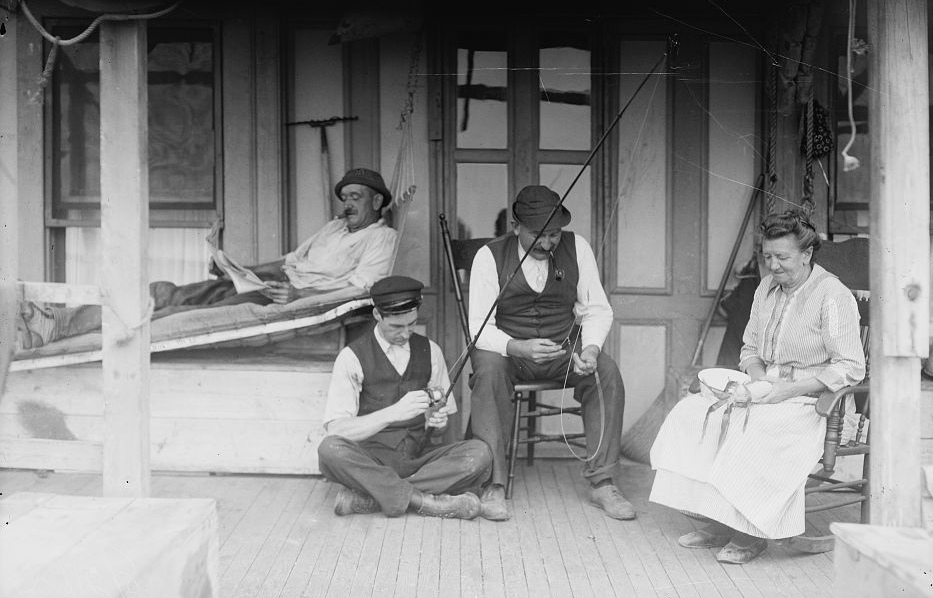
Seen in 1915

In 1915, the city leased Broad Channel Island, Goose Creek Island, and Raunt Island to Pierre Noel, who subleased it to the Broad Channel Corporation. The 30-year lease specified payments of $16.57 per acre for the first three years and a maximum of $33.73 per acre for the last five years of the thirty-year term. The Broad Channel Corporation in turn made 10-year subleases to private individuals for the development of summer bungalows and houses.

There was public criticism of the lease after the public learned about the deal, which Pierre Noel, president of the Broad Channel Corporation, countered by pointing to $180,000 of improvements it had made, including digging a well to supply drinking water, building a power plant, adding landfill to reduce the need for houses on piles, and laying out streets on the island. Residents disputed the quality of these improvements, however, saying that the tap water was brown and not potable, that their houses had no electricity, and that there were no sewers on the island.

The Broad Channel Corporation responded by saying the water was of the same quality as was available in the Rockaways and that it planned to install a filtration device to remove the iron from the tap water. It said that the streets had electric lights, and it said installing sewers was not possible on the island.

For years, the only way to reach the island was by ferry or railroad, but in 1925, the North Channel Bridge opened, connecting the island to Howard Beach. The Cross Bay Parkway Bridge also opened in 1925 (replaced in 1939, and again in 1970), connecting to the Rockaways. The railroad trestle across Jamaica Bay experienced around 30 fires between 1942 and 1950. One such fire, between The Raunt and Broad Channel stations on May 7, 1950, cut service on the middle section of the railroad line. The LIRR, then bankrupt, could not afford to repair the trestle, and the city of New York purchased the line in 1952, and it reopened as the New York City Subway's IND Rockaway Line in 1956.

Parks Commissioner Robert Moses announced his intention to build a park on the island in 1938; he planned recreation on the shore with a wildlife sanctuary on the north end of the island. The next year, the Broad Channel Corporation declared bankruptcy, and the city acquired the island's property titles. In May 1944, Broad Channel's 4,000 residents, collectively living in 1,260 homes, secured an injunction that would prevent the city from evicting them by April 30, 1948.

Later in 1944, the New York City Board of Estimate indicated that it would give residents the right to purchase the land under their houses. However, this right was denied for many years. The city made many attempts to alter the island's purpose, but the local community resisted them all. Proposed changes included the construction of a commercial port and the extension of John F. Kennedy International Airport.

Rumors of high hepatitis rates spread in 1967 because of the island's bad sewage system. At the time, several homes still dumped sewage into the bay, causing activities like clamming, wading, and swimming to be banned. The health hazards prompted the city to again attempt eviction proceedings against Broad Channel's residents, which prompted them to protest, and the Board of Estimate ordered the residents' leases to be renewed the following year, despite the real estate commissioner's protests. The government of New York City finally granted Broad Channel residents the right to purchase their property in 1982. The Joseph P. Addabbo Memorial Bridge replaced the dilapidated North Channel Bridge in 1993.

=== 21st century ===
In 1998, Broad Channel's Labor Day parade received negative media attention after video of a float that parodied the racially motivated dragging death of an African American man was made public. Three white participants on the float, all city emergency workers, were later fired from their jobs as a result of the parade incident. They sued the city for wrongful termination, and their claims were upheld in federal district court in 2003, but the firings were upheld upon appeal in 2006.

In August 2011, Broad Channel faced its first mandatory evacuation due to Hurricane Irene. In the aftermath, two homes on Church Road between East 12th and 14th Road collapsed into Jamaica Bay due to the high storm tide. In October 2012, Broad Channel faced another mandatory evacuation due to Hurricane Sandy. It sustained heavy damage with widespread flooding affecting most homes in the area, and in subsequent days, widespread prolonged power cuts and shortages of food and water were reported.

Press reports indicated that at least parts of the neighborhood were flooded from time to time by high tides. The city proposed steps such as raising the streets and sidewalks by three feet. The street raising and new sea walls, installation of which were ongoing as of 2017, serve to stop street flooding. Broad Channel remains as one of the New York City neighborhoods most vulnerable to flooding, and had the highest proportion of repeated flood-related insurance claims as of 2018.

== Demographics ==
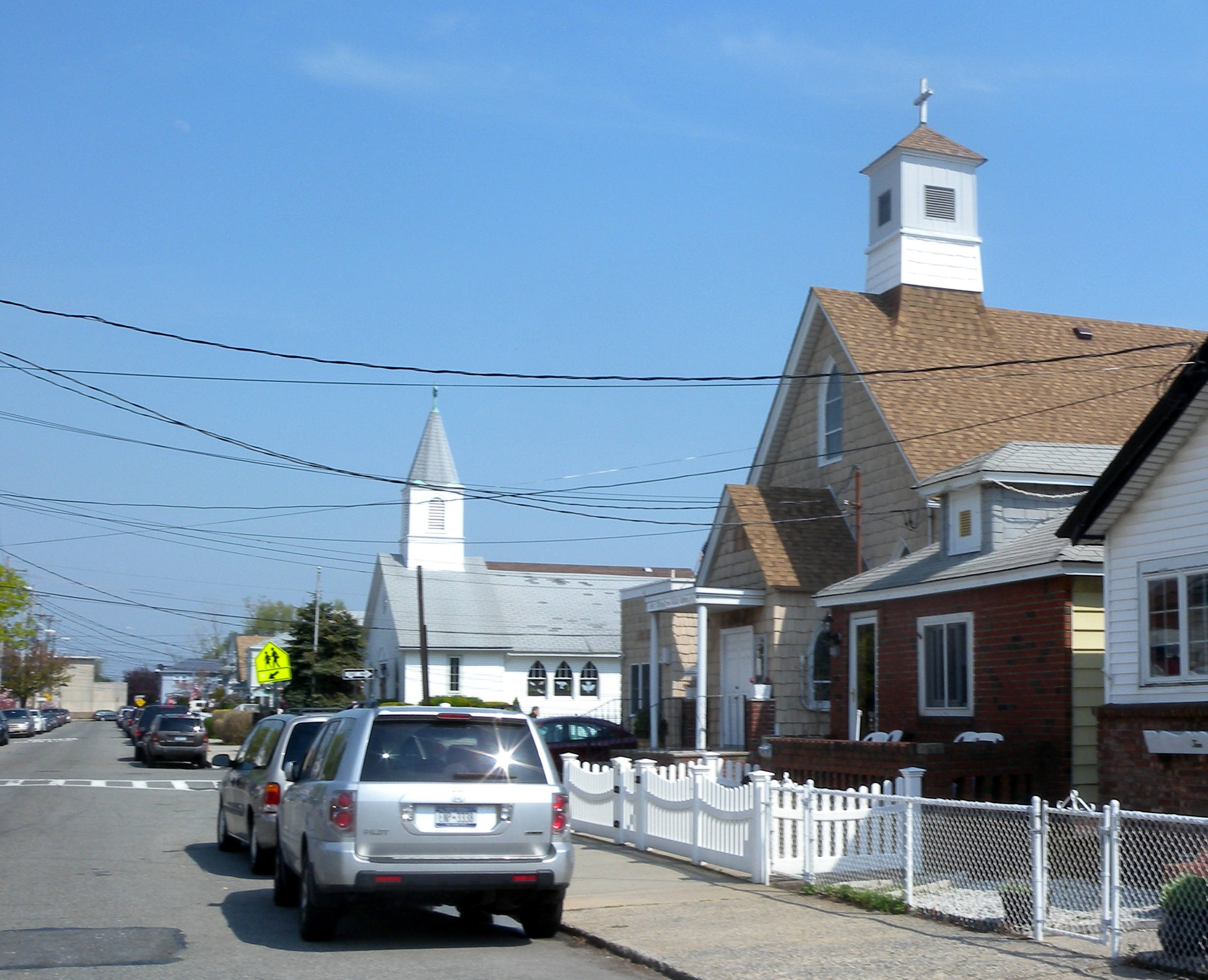
Churches in Broad Channel

In the 2020 United States census, Broad Channel had a population of 2,370. The population density was 4,439.0 inhabitants per square mile (1,713.9/km^{2}). There were 883 households living in a total of 977 housing units, a 90.4% occupancy rate. The racial makeup of the neighborhood was 86.9% White, 1.4% Black or African American, 2.1% Asian, 0.3% Native American, 4.3% from other races, and 5.1% from two or more races. Ethnically, the population was 11.1% Hispanic or Latino of any race.

A 2014 New York Times article reported that many of Broad Channel's residents were civil servants or emergency workers. In 2015, according to the Census Bureau's Opportunity Atlas, about 47% of 34-to-40-year-old adults who grew up in Broad Channel still resided in the neighborhood, compared to 20% of adults in that age range citywide who grew up near their childhood homes. This was among the highest resident retention rates of any neighborhood in the city.

== Transportation ==
=== Public transportation ===
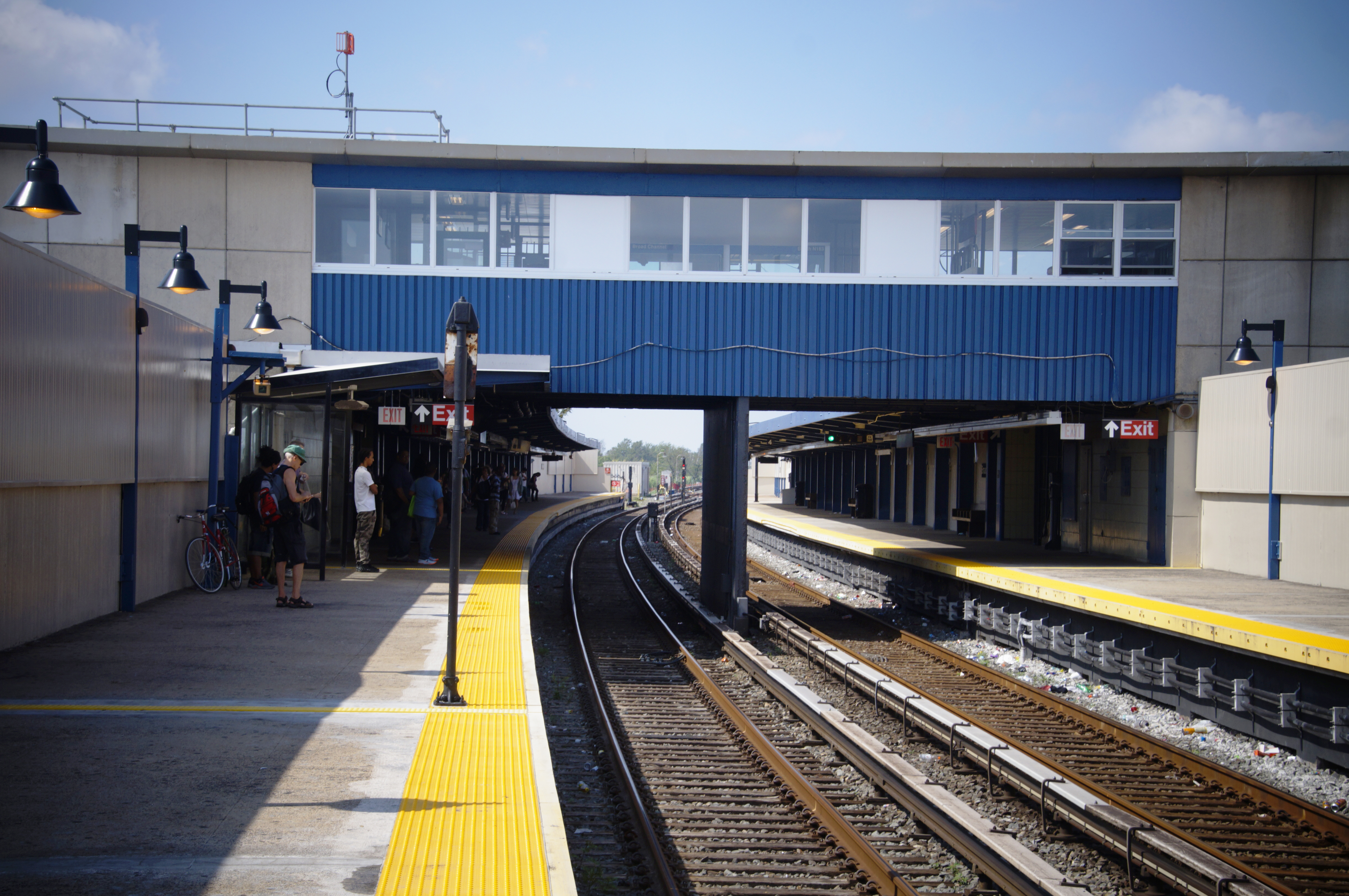
The Broad Channel station

The New York City Subway's IND Rockaway Line (A and S trains) has a subway station in Broad Channel. The Q52 and Q53 Select Bus Service routes and the QM15, QM16 and QM17 express routes along Cross Bay Boulevard also serve Broad Channel.

=== Street grid ===
From the 1950s to the 1970s, some mapmakers have shown the streets of Broad Channel as being part of the street naming system found in the rest of Queens besides the Rockaways, with the numbers of "Streets" increasing from west to east, the numbers of "Avenues" increasing from north to south, etc. However, Broad Channel streets have always had their own numbering format, including "East" and "West" (in relation to Cross Bay Boulevard), as well as named "Roads" numbered north to south; this street naming system is independent of those used elsewhere in the borough. The directional prefixes ensured no duplication with any other "Road" in Queens. There are no numerical north-south or even any named "Streets" in Broad Channel.

=== Bridges ===
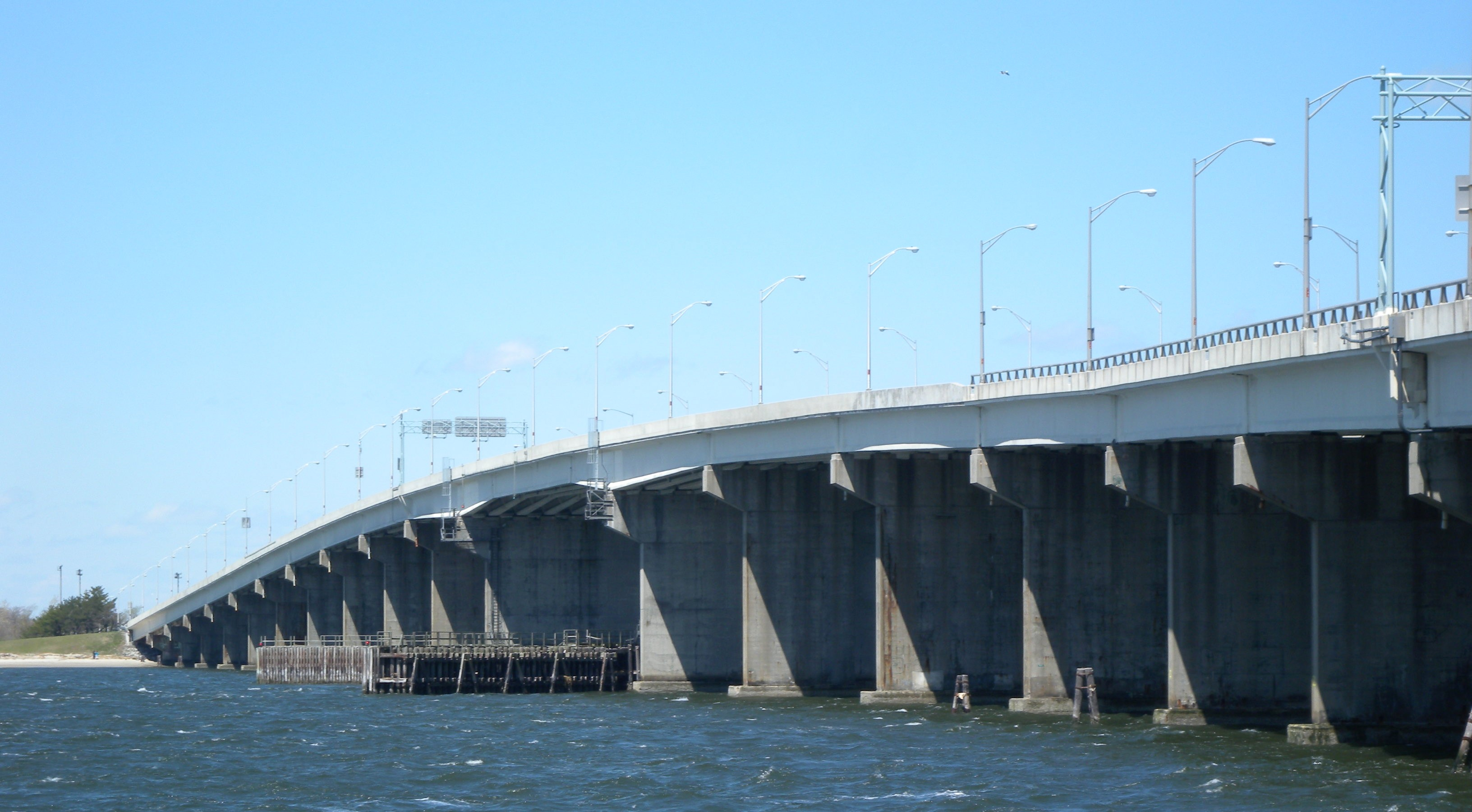
The Cross Bay Veterans Memorial Bridge

Broad Channel is connected to the rest of Queens via four bridges: the tolled, vehicular Cross Bay Veterans Memorial Bridge to the south; the free, vehicular Joseph P. Addabbo Memorial Bridge to the north; and the two IND Rockaway Line swing bridges. Cross Bay Boulevard, the island's only through road, traverses the two vehicular bridges, both of which also carry bicycle and pedestrian traffic. Lying between Howard Beach and the Rockaway Peninsula, it is connected to those communities by these bridges, at either end of the island.

Following the construction of the Cross Bay Parkway bridge in 1939, a drawbridge connecting Broad Channel with the Rockaway Peninsula (which replaced the original, narrow, 1925 drawbridge), the island became easily accessible by car. However, the drawbridge opened up many times per day, and whenever it opened, traffic would back up to Howard Beach, as well as on the Rockaway Peninsula.

In the mid-to-late 1960s, a new bridge was constructed. It opened on May 28, 1970. It was renamed the Cross Bay Veterans Memorial Bridge in 1977. It is maintained by MTA Bridges and Tunnels, and a $3.75 toll ($2 with E-ZPass) must be paid to use the bridge.

The Joseph P. Addabbo Memorial Bridge connects Broad Channel to Howard Beach and the mainland. Opening in 1993, it was formerly known as the North Channel Bridge. It replaced an older North Channel Bridge built in 1925, which was deteriorated to the point where it was beyond repair. It is maintained by the New York City Department of Transportation, and is free.

== Education ==
=== Schools ===
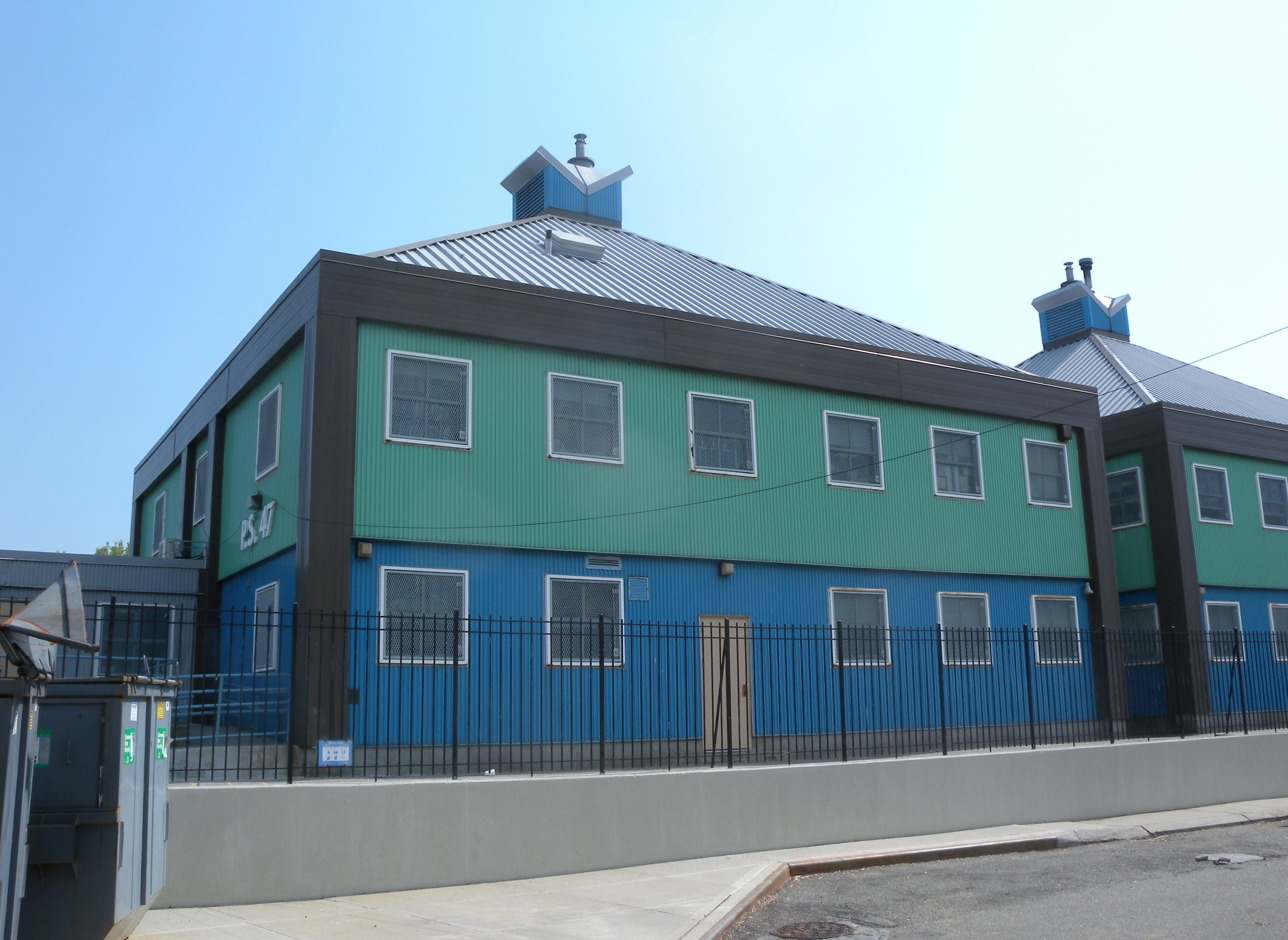
PS 47

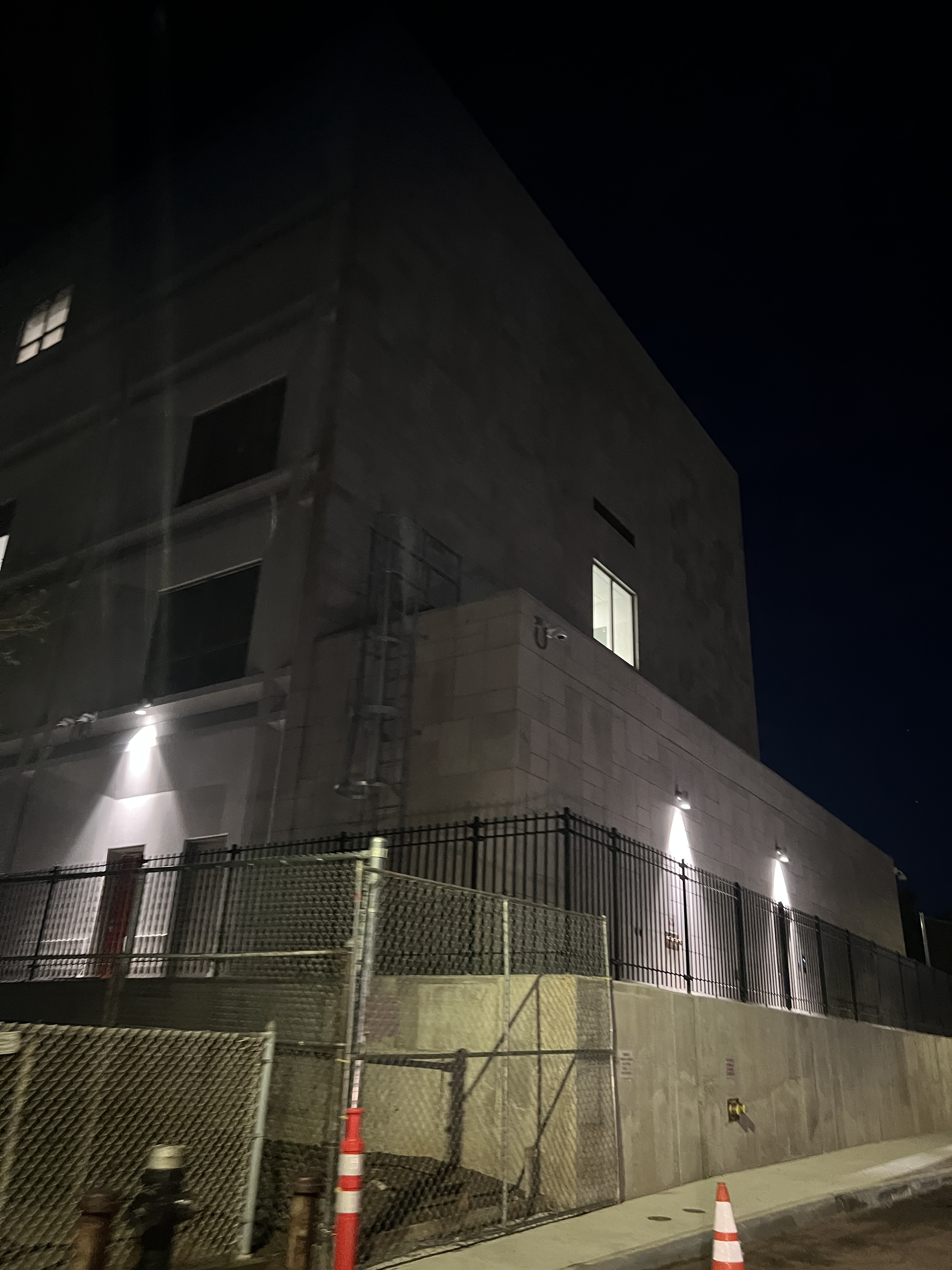

Broad Channel is served by the New York City Department of Education. Elementary school students attend PS 47, which serves pre-K through eighth grades; the school facilities were completely remodeled during the 1990s. In the 2023-2024 school year, after 2 years of construction, PS 47 reopened in a new building.

Broad Channel was also home to St. Virgilius School, a Roman Catholic School that was part of the Diocese of Brooklyn. However, after a lengthy battle between parents and the Diocese, St. Virgilius School closed in 2006. Two years later, upon the retirement of its administrator, Rev. John P. Maloney, St. Virgilius Parish of Broad Channel merged with St. Camillus Parish of Rockaway Park.

=== Library ===
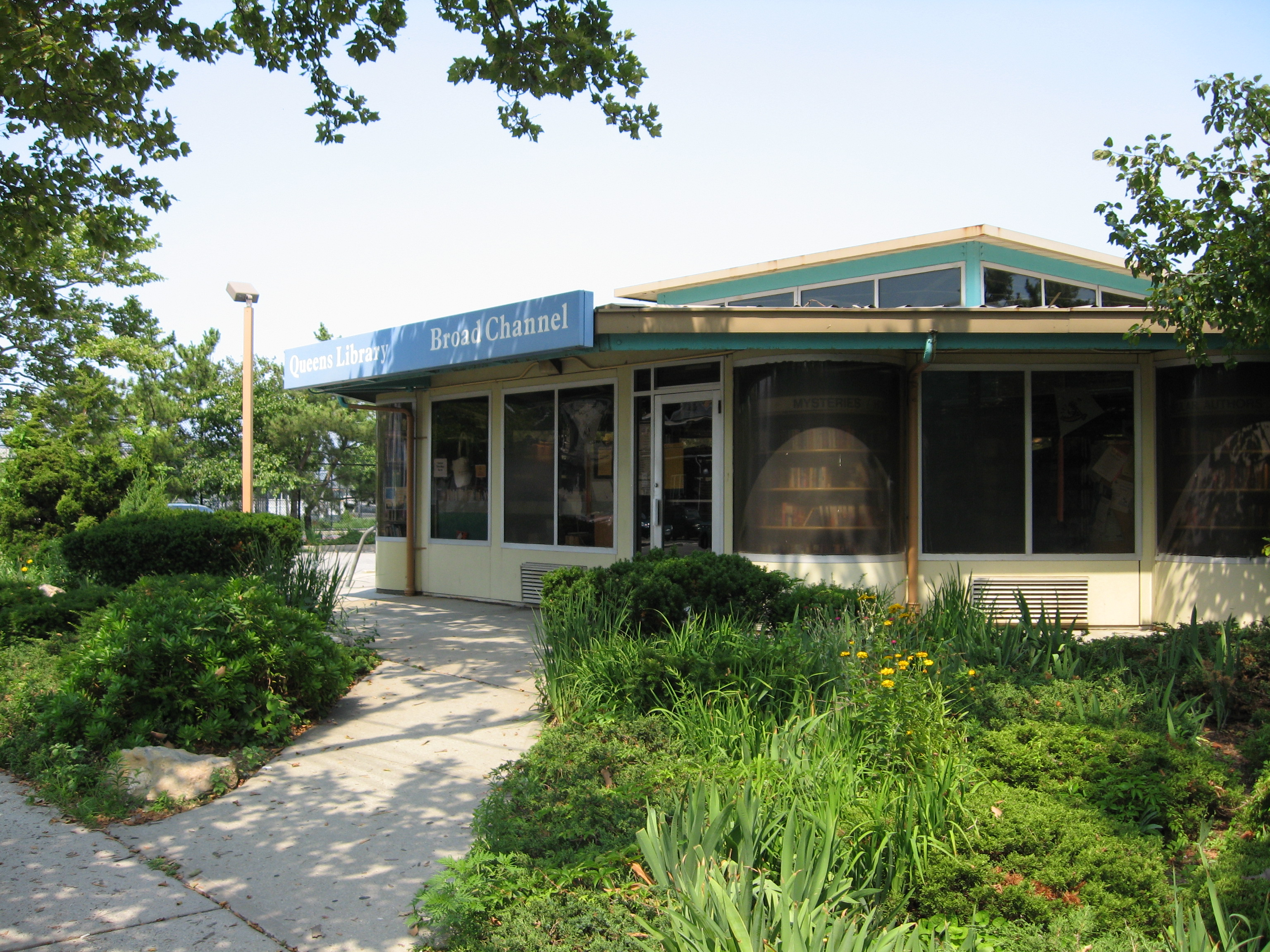
Local branch of Queens Public Library

The Queens Public Library's Broad Channel branch is located at 16-26 Cross Bay Boulevard.

== Organizations ==
=== Broad Channel Athletic Club ===
The non-profit Broad Channel Athletic Club was established in 1961. The baseball teams are registered with Little League and host an in-house baseball league, and participate in the Catholic Youth Organization. The football league plays in the Nassau and Suffolk Football League. The soccer league is completely run by the organization and participates in the Catholic Youth Organization. The swimming team participates in the Police Athletic League of New York City and the Catholic Youth Organization. The basketball league also participates in the Catholic Youth Organization.

=== Broad Channel Historical Society ===
The Broad Channel Historical Society was established in 1994 by the Civic Association's then-president Danny Mundy after he read the local Channel News newsletter's "Glimpse of the Past" column. Ada L. Smith, the New York State Senator representing the district, distributed funds, which the society used to purchase notebooks to record the community's history. Since June 1995, the society has held Annual Historical Day every year so visitors could look at the collection in the Broad Channel Library.

The Broad Channel Library has been the home for the historical collection. The collection was microfilmed in 1997. The microfilm is available for viewing at the Central Branch in Jamaica, Queens. Also in 1997 the first annual Historical Calendar was published. The calendars feature old pictures of Broad Channel and tidal information.

=== Broad Channel Volunteer Fire Department ===
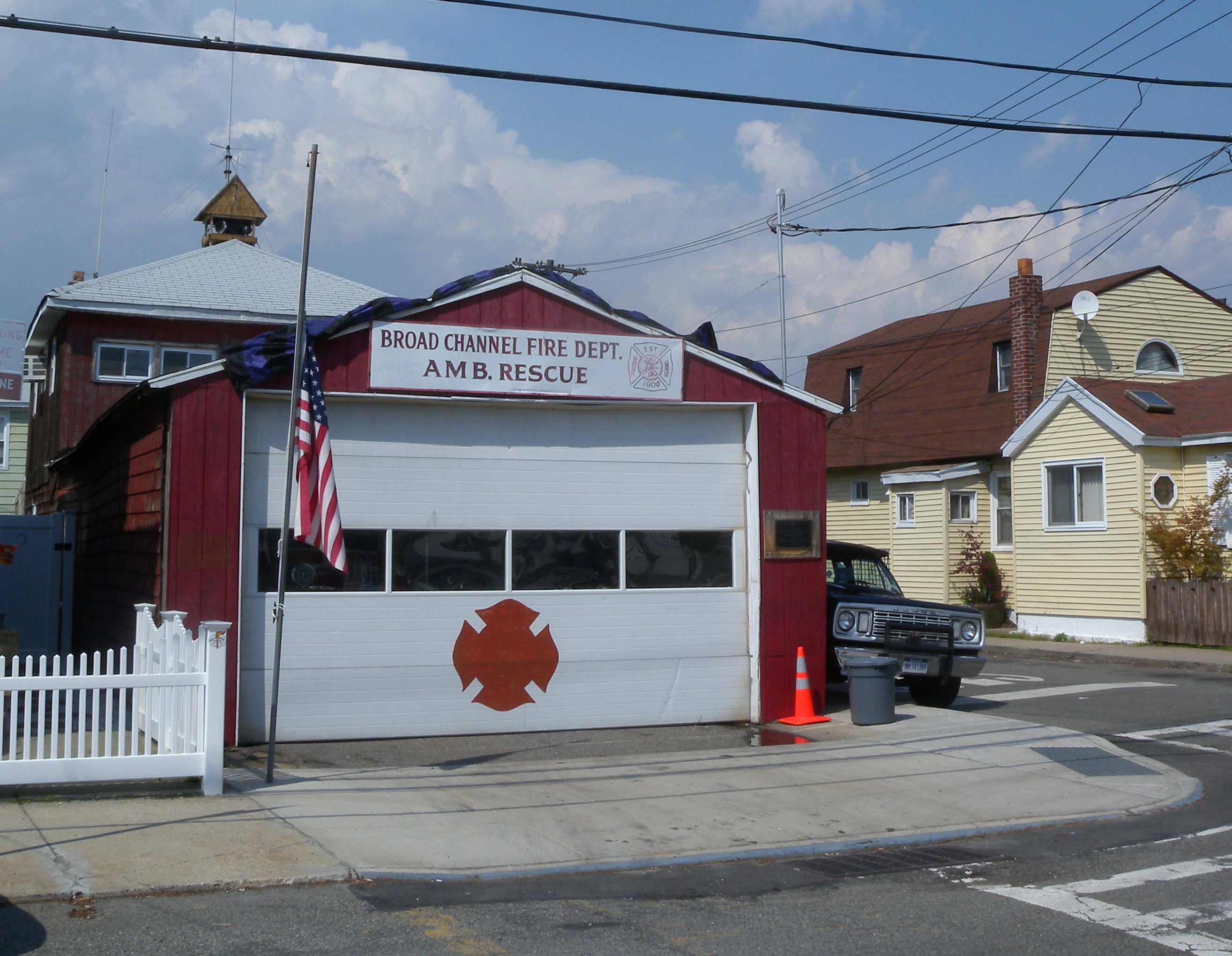
Fire Department

The department originally started in 1905 as bucket brigade to help minimize property loss due to fires. In 1907, this brigade was formally organized into the Broad Channel Volunteer Fire Association under its first Chief, Edward H. Schleuter. The current firehouse at 15 Noel Road was opened in the summer of 1908. In 1913, Chief Chris Hoobs died of a heart attack responding to a fire. The association received their fire charter from the state of New York in 1917 and were known from then on as the Broad Channel Volunteers.

In 1956, then-Deputy Chief Robert H. Russell Sr. added volunteer ambulance services to provide first aid and ambulatory care to the residents of Broad Channel. He would also go on to be elected to the rank of Chief of Department twenty-one times from 1957 to 1973, 1975–1977, and again in 1984. By the early 1960s, the department was growing rapidly in both stature in the community and as an organization as a whole.

On summer weekends during the 1950s and 1960s, the FDNY would send a spare engine and a crew detailed from other firehouses, known as Engine Company No. 341, to the Broad Channel Volunteers' quarters to assist in answering alarms on the island. The bridges at the northern and southern ends of the island were draw bridges and were frequently opened for large passing ships. The southern bridge was particularly active due to the numerous tankers carrying fuel to nearby Idlewild Airport (now John F. Kennedy International Airport).

On average it took from 30 to 45 minutes from the lowering of the traffic barriers, the opening and closing of the lift bridge, and the raising of the traffic barriers before traffic could again move. Occasionally, the bridge would get stuck in the open position effectively closing Cross Bay Boulevard for extended periods. This would impede responses by FDNY apparatus, EMS & NYPD companies to the island for any type of emergency.

Also, Cross Bay Boulevard, then 4 lanes in each direction, would be jammed by beach goers and those looking to vacation at Rockaway's bungalows and hotels and its famous Rockaway Playland. Often the FDNY firefighters would leave their apparatus parked on the Boulevard and join the volunteers on their apparatus because they were smaller than the FDNY apparatus and could maneuver down the very narrow streets.

Over the years, the Broad Channel Volunteers have been in service, they have created a close working relationship with the local FDNY companies as well as the volunteer companies from Nassau & Suffolk Counties. The Broad Channel Volunteers are also dues paying members of many organizations such as the Southern New York Volunteer Firemans Association, the Firemans Association of the State of New York, and along with the 8 other volunteer fire departments in the 5 boroughs of New York City, they are members of Volunteer Firemans Association of the City of New York.

In the late 1970s, The Broad Channel Junior Fire Department was organized to help train young teens in the aspects of the fire and EMS service as well as dispatching and clerical duties while still cleaning the firehouse and its apparatus. When its members turned 18, they were allowed to begin riding the apparatus as firefighters or start training as EMTs. The benefit was these teens were already knowledgeable in the operations of the department and it became a breeding ground for the departments future firefighters, officers and chiefs. They would later become a Boy Scout Explorer Post, #3069.

In 1994, under Chief Dan McIntyre, the volunteer ambulance corps was granted their New York State Certification. Since then, the department took the initiative to require all its firefighters to be New York State Certified in all aspects of the fire service as well as EMS. In 1994, Chief Dan McIntyre also started the departments Marine Company which is still in service to present day. The department operates a small Coast Guard-like Zodiac as a swift water rescue team with certified EMTs on board and in some instances certified divers as well.

In 2012, as a result of Hurricane Sandy, the fire department lost many resources, including both of its fire trucks and both of its ambulances. Therefore, a replacement fire truck from Chanhassen, Minnesota, was loaned to the Broad Channel Volunteer Fire Department. In addition, neighboring Minnesota towns sent resources, including extra boots and helmets from Victoria and Carver; four air monitors, one Jaws of Life apparatus, and two power generators from Chaska; and a truck with resources worth about $20,000 from the Sioux community there.

The Broad Channel Volunteers, Inc., is a 501(c)(3) not-for-profit organization that relies solely on door to door fundraising, grants from politicians and from the state, and since 1905 has been operated by 100% volunteers.

== Parks ==
=== Sunset Cove Park ===
Opened on August 21, 2019, Sunset Cove Park is located on 12.57 acres (5.09 ha) of land that was formerly occupied by a marina. In the process, some 1,000 cubic yards (760 m^{3}) of debris and 30,000 cubic yards (23,000 m^{3}) of polluted soil was removed, and a 4.5-acre (1.8 ha) salt marsh and 7-acre (2.8 ha) upland area was restored. Furthermore, a walkway and shoreline berm were constructed and 16,000 short tons (14,000 long tons; 15,000 t) of sand were imported to the site. A future construction phase, which will commence in 2021, will include an oyster garden, a dock, and a boardwalk to reach the salt marsh.

=== Broad Channel American Park ===
Broad Channel American Park opened in May 1995, located at the southernmost end of Broad Channel, sits along Jamaica Bay. The park features two grass baseball fields, one asphalt baseball field, benches, water fountains, a parking area, four basketball standards, and a small play area. The flagpole area is surrounded by a nautically themed sitting area. The park was given its present name in March 1998.

=== Broad Channel Park ===
Broad Channel Park, also known as 17th Road Playground, is located on Cross Bay Boulevard and stretches between 16th and 18th Roads. This park includes a hockey rink, basketball courts, handball courts, playgrounds, and tennis courts.

=== Gene Gray Playground ===
Gene Gray Playground, at Cross Bay Boulevard and East 9th Road, is named for Eugene Gray (1927–1973), a community activist who supported the construction of the island's first adventure playground prior to his death. In 1987, the Broad Channel Civic Association and Queens Community Board 14 successfully petitioned to rename the playground after Gray. The playground, which cost $457,688, opened on November 12, 1987, to designs by Richard Dattner. The wooden play structures in the playground was themed to a nautical fortress, with a bridge designed to look like a sailing ship. There is also a 75-year-old willow tree, nine red maple trees, and ninety burning bushes surrounding the playground.
