= Joseph P. Addabbo Memorial Bridge =

Bridge in Queens, New York

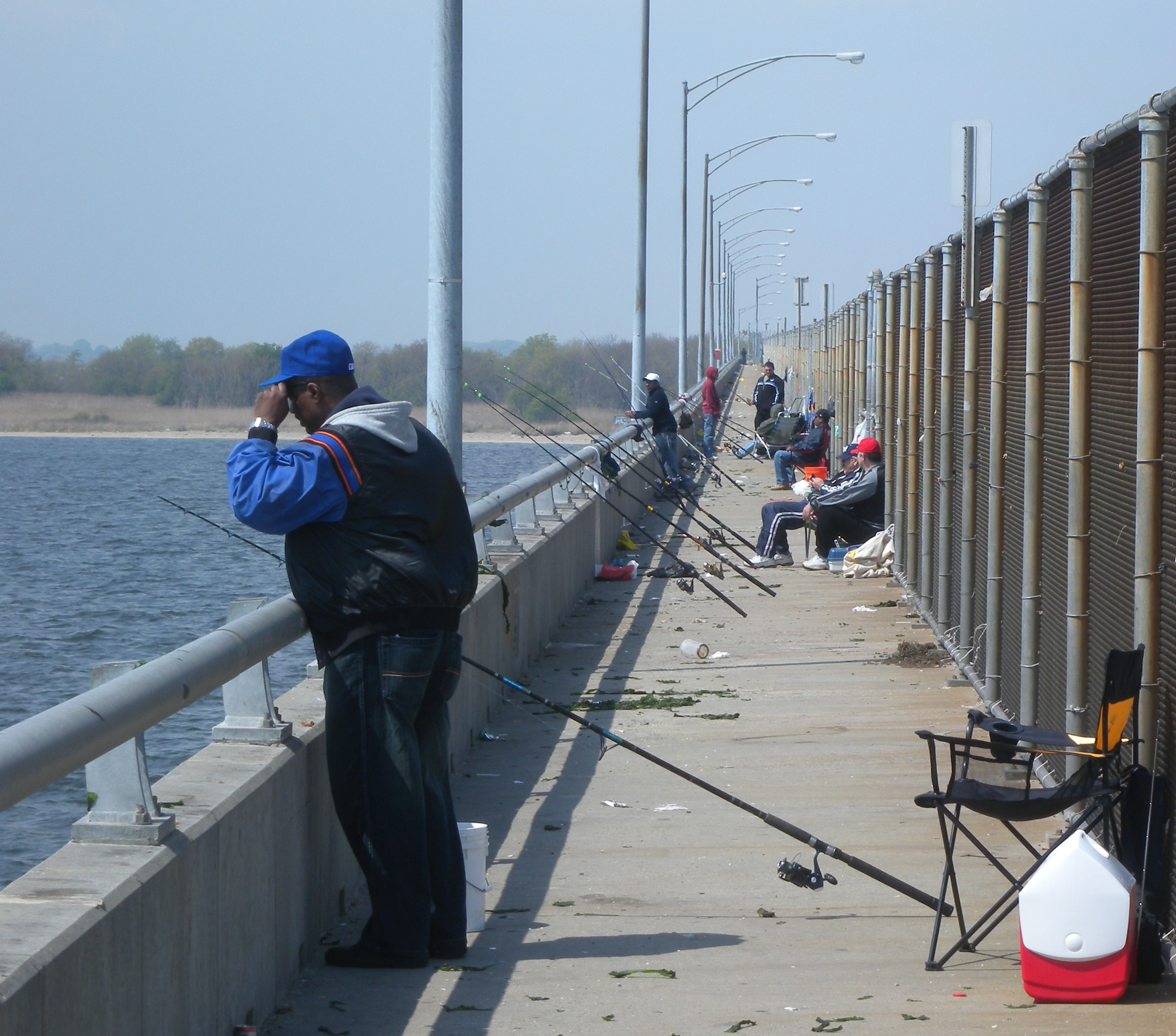
- Walkway along west side
- Coordinates: 40°38′32″N 73°50′5″W
- Carries: Cross Bay Boulevard
- Crosses: Jamaica Bay
- Locale: New York City
- Maintained by: New York State Department of Transportation

History
- Construction start: October 25, 1988
- Construction end: 1993

Statistics
- Daily traffic: 25,874 (2016)

The Joseph P. Addabbo Memorial Bridge (formerly the North Channel Bridge) is a bridge that carries Cross Bay Boulevard across Jamaica Bay in Queens, New York City, between Howard Beach and Broad Channel. The fixed bridge, carrying six lanes of Cross Bay Boulevard, is named for the late Joseph P. Addabbo, who represented the area in the United States House of Representatives from 1961 to 1986.

The bridge was built alongside the original North Channel Bridge (1925-1993) as a replacement; a lack of maintenance on the old bascule bridge had allowed it to deteriorate to the point where it was beyond repair.
