= Cross Bay Veterans Memorial Bridge =

Bridge in Queens, New York

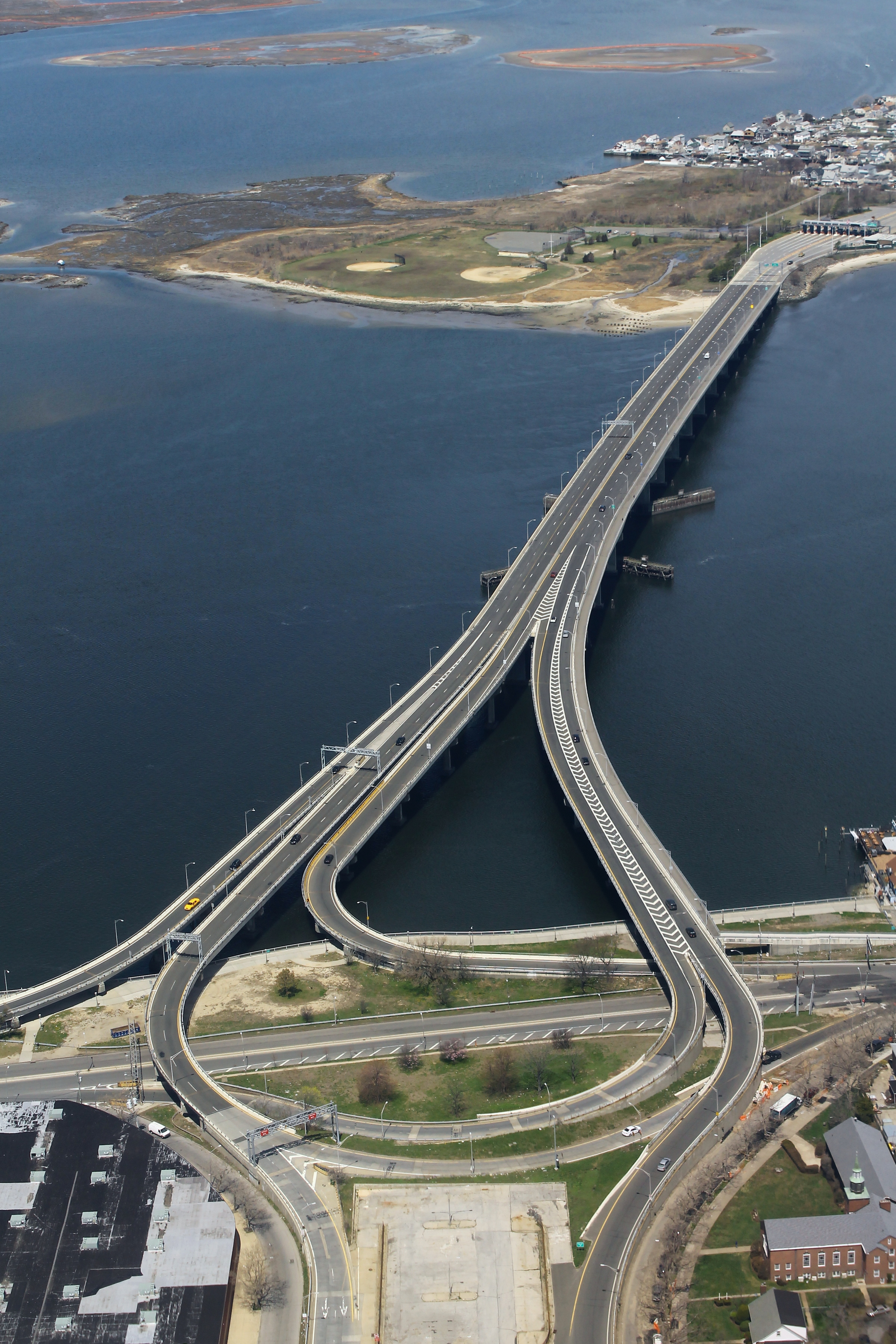
- Aerial view of the bridge
- Coordinates: 40.591497°N 73.819614°W
- Carries: Cross Bay Boulevard
- Crosses: Jamaica Bay
- Locale: Broad Channel and Rockaway Peninsula, in New York City
- Maintained by: MTA Bridges and Tunnels

Characteristics
- Total length: 3,000 feet (910 m)
- Longest span: 275 feet (84 m)
- Clearance below: 55 feet (17 m)

History
- Opened: May 28, 1970

Statistics
- Daily traffic: 24,150 (2016)
- Toll: As of August 6, 2023, $5.60 (Tolls By Mail and non-New York E-ZPass); $2.60 (New York E-ZPass); $4.11 (Mid-Tier NYCSC E-Z Pass)

Location
- Interactive map of Cross Bay Veterans Memorial Bridge

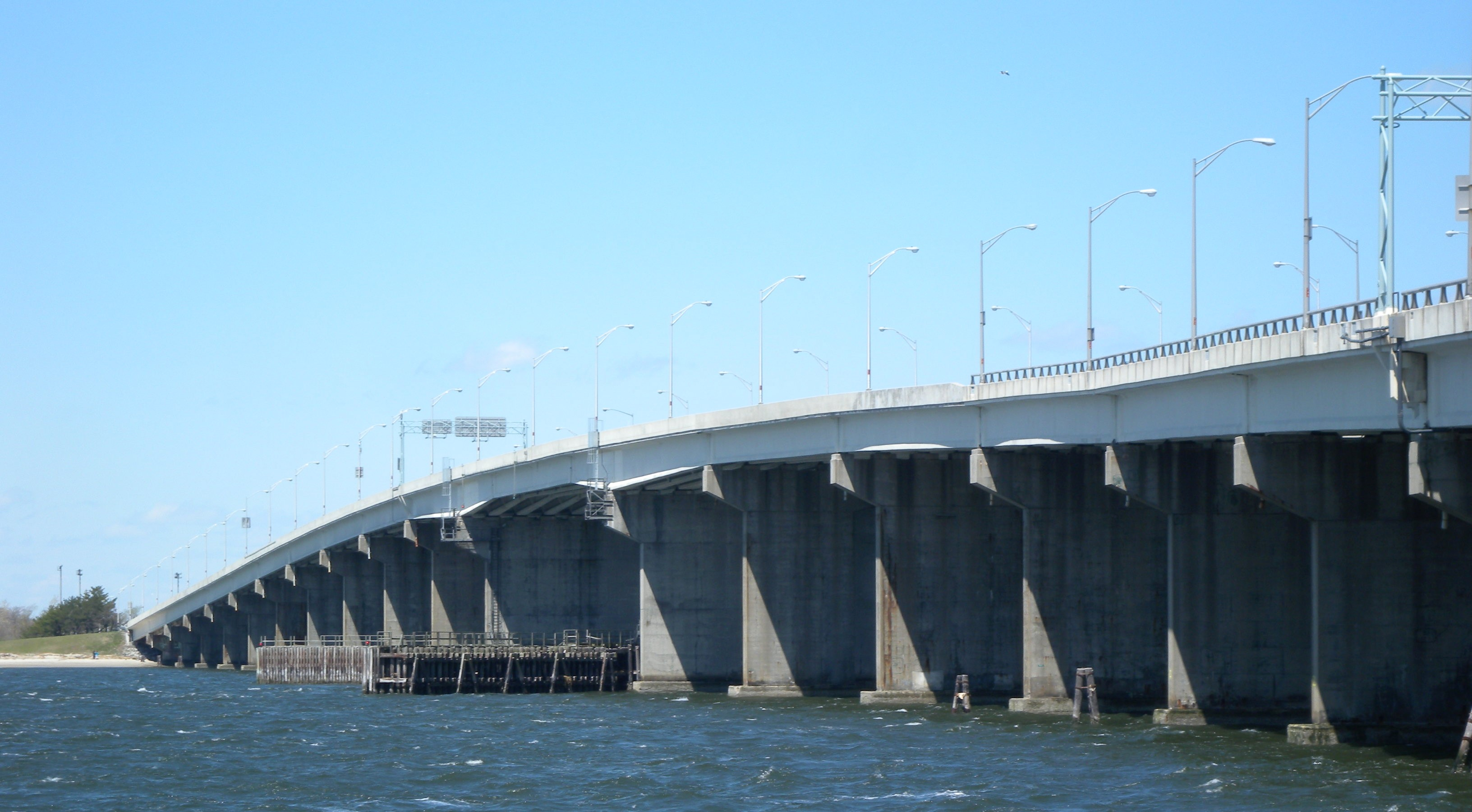
Bridge viewed from the ground

The Cross Bay Veterans Memorial Bridge (originally Cross Bay Bridge or Cross Bay Parkway Bridge) is a toll bridge that carries Cross Bay Boulevard across Jamaica Bay in Queens, New York City, between Broad Channel and the Rockaway Peninsula.

== Description and history ==
Planning for a bridge across Jamaica Bay, connecting Howard Beach with Rockaway Beach via Beach Channel, had begun by 1917. Construction began in 1923. The bridge was intended to save travel time for people in Manhattan traveling to the Rockaways. The bridge was designed by the engineering firm of Madigan-Hyland. Contractor J. Rich Steers, Inc., built the bridge for the New York City Parkway Authority, which was later merged into the Triborough Bridge and Tunnel Authority. The bridge was a part of a program to develop Jamaica Bay as a recreational area instead of an industrial port. The bridge opened in 1925, at a cost of $7 million (equivalent to $102 million in 2025).

The original bridge was intended to sufficiently handle traffic for many years to come, but by 1929 it was already becoming overly congested. The bridge was replaced with a newer, low-level bascule bridge in the same location that was opened on June 3, 1939, at a cost of $33 million (equivalent to $399 million in 2025). It consisted of a widened version of the previous drawbridge, and a grade-separated interchange complex feeding into Beach Channel Drive and the Cross Bay Parkway. The Cross Bay Parkway was extended south along Beach 94th Street and Beach 95th Street to the Shore Front Parkway along Rockaway Beach. Following its completion, Harry Taylor, head of the New York City Parkway Authority, said it had "transformed the old-time beach resort of blighted shacks, cheap amusements and limited play space into a modern playground of the type and character of Jones Beach."

The bridge was reconstructed at a cost of $26 million (equivalent to $166 million in 2025) and opened to traffic on May 28, 1970. The current bridge is a high-level fixed bridge carrying six traffic lanes and a sidewalk on the east side. The bridge was built 55 feet (17 m) high in order to allow boats pass under without the delays caused by the previous drawbridge. The bridge is operated by the Triborough Bridge and Tunnel Authority, an affiliate agency of the Metropolitan Transportation Authority.

== Tolls ==
As of January 4, 2026, drivers pay $6.02 per car or $5.06 per motorcycle for tolls by mail/non-NYCSC E-Z Pass. E-ZPass users with transponders issued by the New York E‑ZPass Customer Service Center pay $2.80 per car or $2.33 per motorcycle. Mid-Tier NYCSC E-Z Pass users pay $4.42 per car or $3.72 per motorcycle. All E-ZPass users with transponders not issued by the New York E-ZPass CSC will be required to pay Toll-by-mail rates.

Until 2010, residents of the Rockaways and Broad Channel could cross the bridge for free. Residents of Broad Channel and the Rockaways who have an E-ZPass pay $1.19 per crossing if they cross up to twice per day, but are not charged if they cross more than twice in 24 hours. The new toll for area residents was part of a series of Metropolitan Transportation Authority budget cuts. Starting in February 2024, all drivers who have a Queens address and a NYCSC E-ZPass have received a 100 percent rebate; Queens residents are automatically enrolled in the program. Residents of the Rockaways and Broad Channel receive not only a 100 percent rebate on Cross Bay Bridge tolls but also a reduced toll at the Marine Parkway–Gil Hodges Memorial Bridge.

Open-road cashless tolling began on April 30, 2017. The tollbooths were dismantled, and drivers are no longer able to pay with cash or tokens at the bridge. Instead, there are cameras mounted onto new overhead gantries manufactured by TransCore near where the booths were located. A vehicle without E-ZPass has a picture taken of its license plate and a bill for the toll is mailed to its owner. For E-ZPass users, sensors detect their transponders wirelessly. Residents with leftover bridge tokens were eligible to redeem their tokens for a refund through the E-ZPass Customer Service prior to April 29, 2017.

== See also ==
- List of reference routes in New York
