= MTA Bridges and Tunnels =

Toll agency in New York City, founded 1933

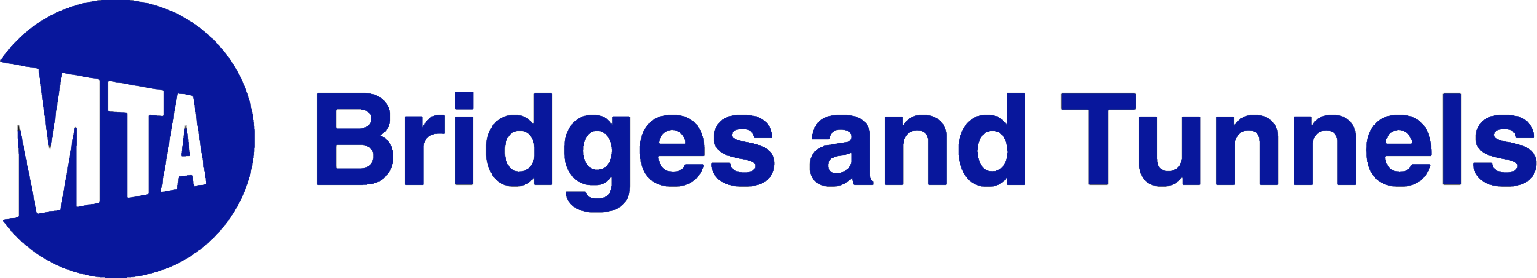
- Type: Public benefit corporation
- Founded: 1933; 93 years ago
- Headquarters: Robert Moses Building, 7 Bronx Shore Road, New York, New York
- Area served: New York City
- Key people: Catherine T. Sheridan (president)
- Revenue: US$2.4 billion (2023)
- Operating income: US$596 million (2023)
- Number of employees: 1,589
- Parent: Metropolitan Transportation Authority
- Website: mta.info/bandt

The Triborough Bridge and Tunnel Authority (TBTA), doing business as MTA Bridges and Tunnels, is an affiliate agency of the Metropolitan Transportation Authority that operates seven toll bridges, two tunnels, and congestion pricing in New York City. The TBTA is the largest bridge and tunnel toll agency in the United States by traffic volume. It generated more than $2.4 billion in toll revenue from 335 million vehicles in 2023. As of 2023, its operating budget was $596 million; the budget is funded through taxes and fees.

The Triborough Bridge and Tunnel Authority was founded in 1933 as the Triborough Bridge Authority (TBA). The agency was named after its first crossing, the Triborough Bridge (renamed Robert F. Kennedy Bridge in 2008). The Triborough Bridge Authority was reorganized as the Triborough Bridge and Tunnel Authority in 1946. It began using the name MTA Bridges and Tunnels in 1994. The TBTA also controlled several buildings such as the New York Coliseum and the East Side Airlines Terminal, both of which have been demolished. The agency maintains operational headquarters at the Robert Moses Building, located at the base of its namesake bridge (the Triborough) on Randall's Island.

The TBTA maintains a law enforcement agency, the TBTA Law Enforcement Division, which employs about 50 "bridge and tunnel officers" who are armed and sworn New York State peace officers. This agency is separate from the MTA Police Department, though the MTA Police supplement bridge and tunnel officers and retain jurisdiction on TBTA properties.

== Facilities ==
Location of MTA Bridges and Tunnels crossings in New York City

The seven bridges are:

- Robert F. Kennedy Bridge, colloquially known by its previous name, the Triborough Bridge, is the agency's flagship crossing, and its original namesake. It connects Manhattan, the Bronx, and Queens, via Randalls and Wards Islands, and was renamed in 2008 after the assassinated former United States Senator from New York, Robert F. Kennedy.
- Bronx–Whitestone Bridge, which connects the Bronx and Queens.
- Verrazzano–Narrows Bridge, which connects Brooklyn and Staten Island.
- Throgs Neck Bridge, which connects the Bronx and Queens.
- Henry Hudson Bridge, which connects Manhattan and the Bronx.
- Marine Parkway–Gil Hodges Memorial Bridge, which connects Brooklyn and the Rockaways in Queens. It is co-named after former Brooklyn Dodgers and New York Mets first baseman, and later Mets' manager, Gil Hodges.
- Cross Bay Veterans Memorial Bridge, which connects Broad Channel to the Rockaways, both in Queens.

The two tunnels are:

- Hugh L. Carey Tunnel, colloquially known by its former name, the Brooklyn–Battery Tunnel, connects Brooklyn and Lower Manhattan. It was renamed in 2012 after former New York governor Hugh L. Carey.
- Queens–Midtown Tunnel, which connects Queens and Midtown Manhattan.

The TBTA also manages the Central Business District Tolling Program in Manhattan south of 61st Street.

Seal of the TBTA

Former Logo of the TBTA, adopted shortly after it was absorbed by the MTA

== History ==
=== Founding ===
MTA Bridges and Tunnels was originally founded as the Triborough Bridge Authority (TBA), which was organized to head the construction of the Triborough Bridge. The structure had started construction in 1929 but stalled during the Great Depression due to a lack of funding. In February 1933, a nine-person committee applied to the Reconstruction Finance Corporation (RFC) for a $150 million loan for projects in New York state, including the Triborough Bridge. While the RFC favored a loan for the Triborough project, the mayor at the time, John P. O'Brien, banned the RFC from giving loans to the city. Instead, O'Brien wanted to create a bridge authority to sell bonds to pay for the construction of the Triborough Bridge as well as for the planned Queens–Midtown Tunnel between Manhattan and Queens. Robert Moses, the New York City parks commissioner, also pushed the state legislature to create an authority to fund, build, and operate the Triborough Bridge.

A bill to create the TBA passed quickly through both houses of the state legislature, and was signed by Governor Herbert H. Lehman in April 1933. The bill included a provision that the authority could sell up to $35 million in bonds and fund the remainder of construction through bridge tolls. George Gordon Battle, a Tammany Hall attorney, was appointed as chairman of the new authority, and three commissioners were appointed. Battle resigned from the chairmanship in November 1933, citing ill health, and was replaced by Nathan Burkan.

=== Early years ===
In its first year, the TBA was in turmoil: by January 1934, one of the TBA's commissioners had resigned, and New York City Mayor Fiorello H. La Guardia was trying another TBA commissioner, John Stratton O'Leary, for corruption. As a result, Public Works Administration (PWA) administrator Harold L. Ickes refused to distribute parts of the RFC grant allotted to the Triborough Bridge, until the existing funds could be accounted for. After O'Leary had been removed, La Guardia appointed Moses to the open commissioner's position, and Ickes gave the city $1.5 million toward the bridge's construction. Robert Moses became the CEO and Secretary of the TBA in February 1934, after the removal of O'Leary from the Board; Moses was additionally appointed chairman in November 1936, following Burkan's death the previous June.

Moses leveraged his leadership of the Triborough Bridge Authority, as well as the state and city positions he also held, to expedite the Triborough project. The Triborough Bridge opened on July 11, 1936. The TBA constructed a second bridge, the Bronx–Whitestone Bridge, between the Bronx and Queens. Construction started in 1937 and the bridge opened on April 29, 1939, in time for the 1939 New York World's Fair in Queens. Moses had proposed a third bridge, the Brooklyn-Battery Bridge, on the site of what is now the Brooklyn-Battery Tunnel. The United States Department of War ultimately rejected the Brooklyn-Battery Bridge as an impediment to shipping, since it would obstruct access from the New York Harbor to the Brooklyn Navy Yard.

Under the chairmanship of Robert Moses, the agency grew in a series of mergers with four other agencies. In January 1940, as part of a deal to build an approach to the Brooklyn–Battery Tunnel, Moses proposed merging the New York City Parkway Authority, which operated the Henry Hudson, Marine Parkway, and Cross Bay Bridges. The City Parkway Authority was merged with the TBA in February 1940. The Parkway Authority had already been merged with the Henry Hudson Parkway Authority, which operated the Henry Hudson Bridge, and with the Marine Parkway Authority, which operated the Marine Parkway Bridge.

This gave the TBA complete control of all parkways and toll bridges located entirely in New York City. The same bill revoked the TBA's right to build a bridge from Brooklyn to the Battery. In 1945, with the pending merger of the Triborough Bridge Authority and the New York City Tunnel Authority, the former was renamed the Triborough Bridge and Tunnel Authority. The authority operated the Queens–Midtown Tunnel and was building the Brooklyn–Battery Tunnel. The merger was finalized in 1946. The TBTA completed the construction of the Brooklyn–Battery Tunnel, which opened to traffic in May 1950.

=== Growth ===
Generating millions of dollars in toll revenue annually, the TBTA easily became a powerful city agency, as it was capable of funding large capital projects. From the 1940s to the 1960s, the TBTA built the Battery Tunnel Parking Garage, Jacob Riis Beach Parking Field, the New York Coliseum, and the East Side Airlines Terminal.

Aside from toll crossings, one of the TBTA's most profitable properties was the New York Coliseum, an office building and convention center at Columbus Circle in Manhattan. The complex cost $35 million to build, of which $26.5 million came from toll revenues collected by the TBTA. The Coliseum, which became New York City's major convention center, had a tax agreement with the city wherein the city government would collect a portion of the TBTA's revenue rather than collect taxes on the Coliseum property. Within the first ten years of the Coliseum's opening, the city had collected almost $9.1 million from the TBTA. This special tax arrangement continued until the property was sold in 1998.

The TBTA built two bridges in the 1960s. The Throgs Neck Bridge, a project to alleviate traffic on the Bronx–Whitestone Bridge, started construction in 1957 and opened in January 1961. The long-planned Verrazzano–Narrows Bridge, which had been proposed as far back as the 1920s, started construction in 1959 and opened in November 1964. Because of higher-than-expected traffic on the Verrazzano–Narrows Bridge, the TBTA built a second deck on the bridge in 1969.

=== Merger with MTA ===
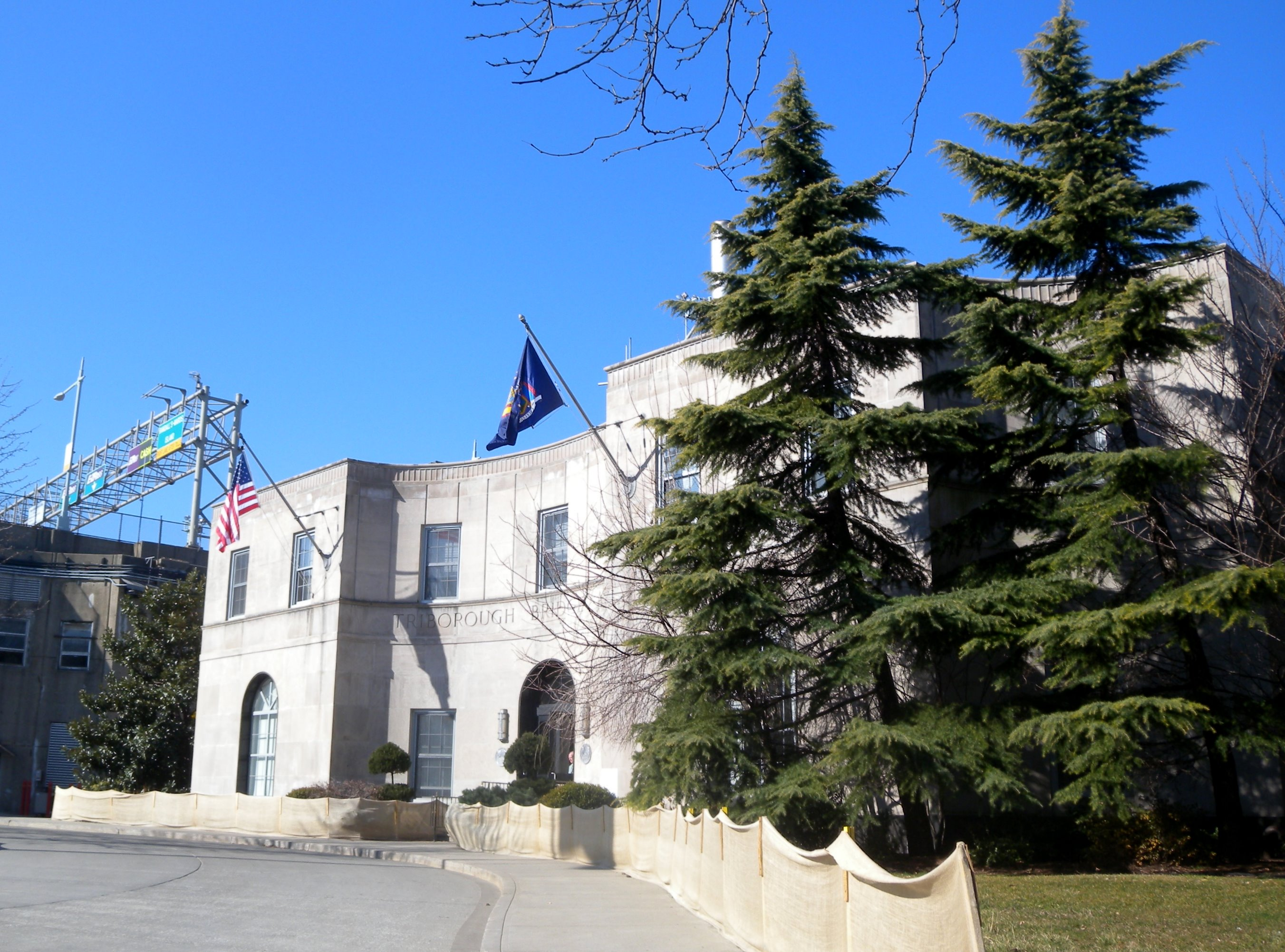
Headquarters on Randall's Island

In January 1966, New York City Mayor John Lindsay proposed merging the New York City Transit Authority (NYCTA), which operated buses and subways in New York City, with the TBTA to create the Metropolitan Commuter Transit Authority (MCTA). While Governor Nelson Rockefeller offered his "complete support" for Lindsay's proposed unified transit agency, Robert Moses called the proposed merger "absurd" and "grotesque" for its unwieldiness. Lindsay then proposed a bill in the state legislature that would allow the mayor to appoint a majority of the members in the new city-run transportation agency, but this was rejected.

In June 1966, Rockefeller announced his plans to expand the MCTA's scope to create a new regional transit authority to encompass the existing MCTA, as well as the NYCTA and TBTA. Lindsay disagreed, saying that the state and city should have operationally separate transit authorities that worked in tandem. In early 1967, Rockefeller proposed merging the NYCTA and TBTA into the MCTA, as well as creating a $2.5 billion bond issue to fund transportation improvements. In May 1967, Rockefeller signed a bill that allowed the MCTA to oversee the mass transit policies of New York City-area transit systems and the TBTA by the following March.

Initially, the TBTA was resistant to the MCTA's efforts to acquire it. Moses was afraid that the enlarged MCTA would "undermine, destroy or tarnish" the integrity of the TBTA, One source of contention was Rockefeller's proposal to use TBTA tolls in order to subsidize the cheap fares of the NYCTA, since Moses strongly opposed any use of TBTA tolls for use by outside agencies. Moses agreed to merge the TBTA into the MCTA in March 1967, and he even campaigned in favor of the transit bond issue. In February 1968, the TBTA's bondholders acquiesced to the MCTA's merger proposal. The TBTA archives, including models of projects built and unbuilt, were transferred to the MTA Bridges and Tunnels Special Archive, at 2 Broadway.

In March 1968, the MCTA dropped the word "Commuter" from its name and became the Metropolitan Transportation Authority (MTA). The MTA took over the operations of the other New York City-area transit systems as well as the TBTA. Moses was relieved from his job as chairman of the TBTA, although he was retained as a consultant. Moses stated that TBTA construction projects would reduce the MTA's budget surplus through 1970. Surplus revenue, formerly used for new automobile projects, was then used to support public transportation.

Since the merger, more than $10 billion has been contributed by the TBTA to subsidize mass transit fares and capital improvements for the New York City Transit, Long Island Rail Road, and Metro-North Railroad. The MTA Bridges and Tunnels trading name was adopted in 1994. The name Triborough Bridge and Tunnel Authority is still the legal name of the Authority.

=== Congestion Pricing ===
In 2019, the New York State legislature designated the TBTA as the lead agency tasked with managing New York City's congestion pricing. The TBTA created a Traffic Mobility Review Board tasked with establishing recommended toll rates and programs. Five of the six members of the board are appointed by the TBTA, with the sixth appointed by the mayor. The program officially launched on January 5, 2025.

== Tolls ==
MTA Bridges and Tunnels collects the vast majority of its tolls through E-ZPass, an electronic toll collection system. E-ZPass was introduced at MTA Bridges and Tunnels crossings between 1995 and 1997.

=== Open-road tolling ===
In October 2016, Governor Andrew Cuomo announced that tollbooths would be removed at all bridges to speed up traffic. Since September 2017, all MTA Bridges & Tunnels facilities have collected tolls through open-road cashless tolling. Tollbooths previously in place have been dismantled, and drivers no longer pay cash at the crossings. Instead, cameras mounted onto new overhead gantries manufactured by TransCore collect the tolls. While some are located where toll booths were previously located, others are located at the opposite ends of the facilities. A vehicle without an E-ZPass has a picture taken of its license plate and a bill for the toll is mailed to its owner. For E-ZPass users, sensors detect their transponders wirelessly.

Automatic number-plate recognition (ALPR) analysis is used to decode the image of the plate into alphanumeric data and the jurisdiction of issue. As of 2018, the MTA B&T's ALPR system was unable to read temporary paper license plates. The system is subject to significant fraud from motorists who obstruct clear views of their license plates. Drivers caught with such plates risk a ticket for an obstructed, missing or unreadable license plate under Section 402 of New York Vehicle and Traffic Law, though these drivers have not been subject to criminal enforcement. Governor Cuomo's 2020 proposed Executive Budget included an amendment to specify the use of a modified license plate to avoid tolls as misdemeanor theft-of-service, but the proposal was not included in the final bill.

The MTA has released no data detailing its losses to modified or obstructed license plates, even though the prevalence of such license plates may result in substantial revenue losses. However, it was theoretically possible for the MTA to have a toll collection rate of over 100 percent, because the $50 and $100 fines for late toll payments have been added to the sum of tolls collected, but not added to the sum of tolls incurred by drivers. This may obscure both sources of toll revenue and causes of toll revenue loss for the MTA.

From December 2018 through November 2019, the MTA successfully collected 97.1 percent of all tolls incurred by drivers, with the lowest rate being 94.8 percent at the Cross Bay Bridge. The preponderance of obstructed or modified license plates in New York City may suggest substantial revenue losses due to that form of fraud. An audit performed by the New York State Comptroller in 2017 criticized the MTA for losses due to issues with reading, and obstruction of, license plates. The MTA's response characterized this as part of "leakage" that is "inherent in the process for any Cashless Tolling environment."

== Public safety ==
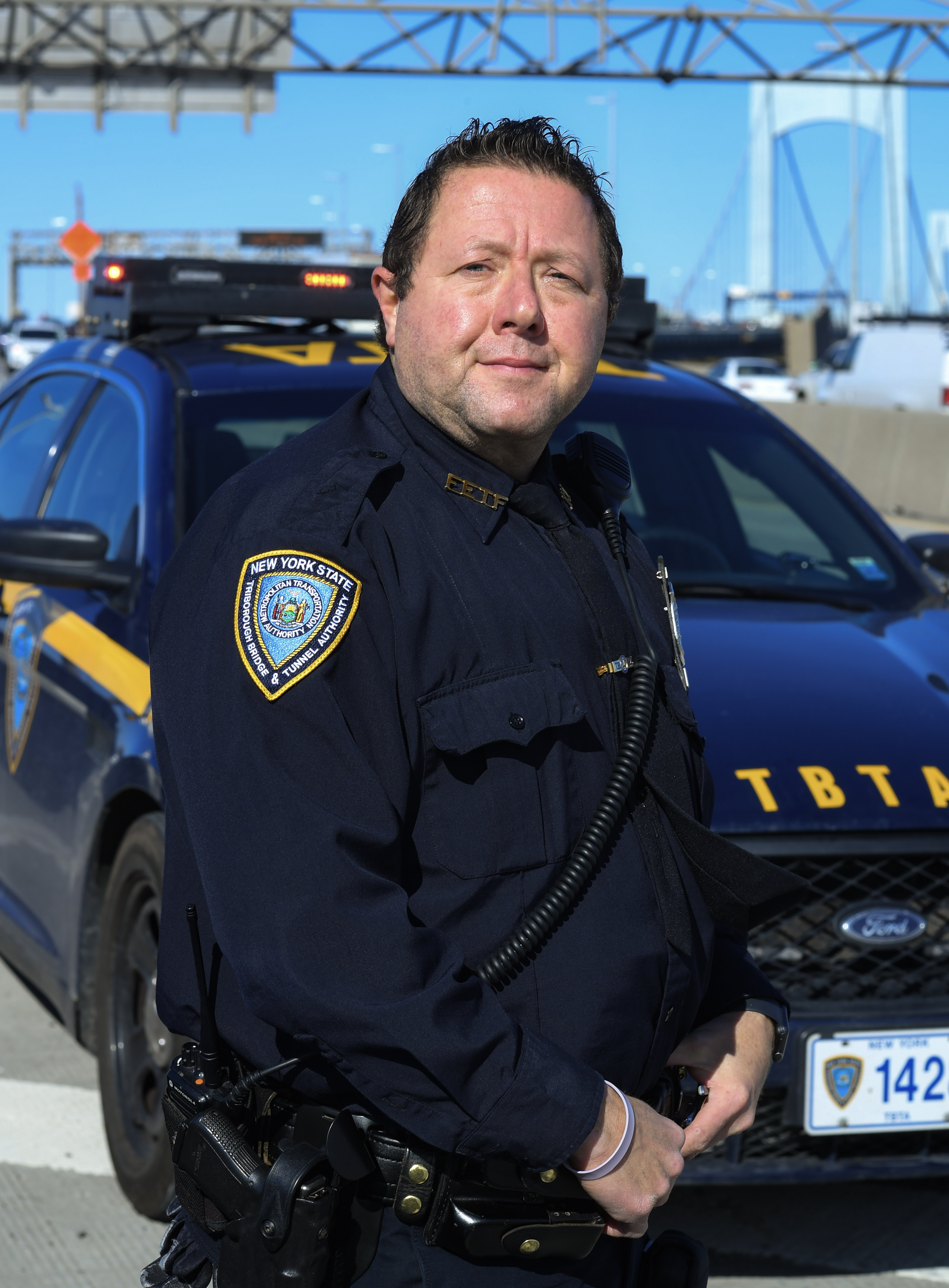
A TBTA officer in 2021

The Triborough Bridge and Tunnel Authority Law Enforcement Division employs around 50 bridge and tunnel officers (BTOs), who perform various tasks concerning vehicular traffic, assisting stranded motorists, and performing security and law enforcement duties at TBTA owned intra-city crossings. BTOs are New York State peace officers under New York Criminal Procedure Law § 2.10. As per New York Criminal Procedure Law § 2.20, BTOs have various law enforcement powers; including the ability to make warrantless arrests, carry firearms on- and off-duty, use physical and deadly force, conduct traffic stops, and issue summons, citations, and tickets, among other powers.

In 2025, the MTA Police began "supplement[ing]" TBTA BTOs.
