= Beach Channel Drive =

Street in Queens, New York

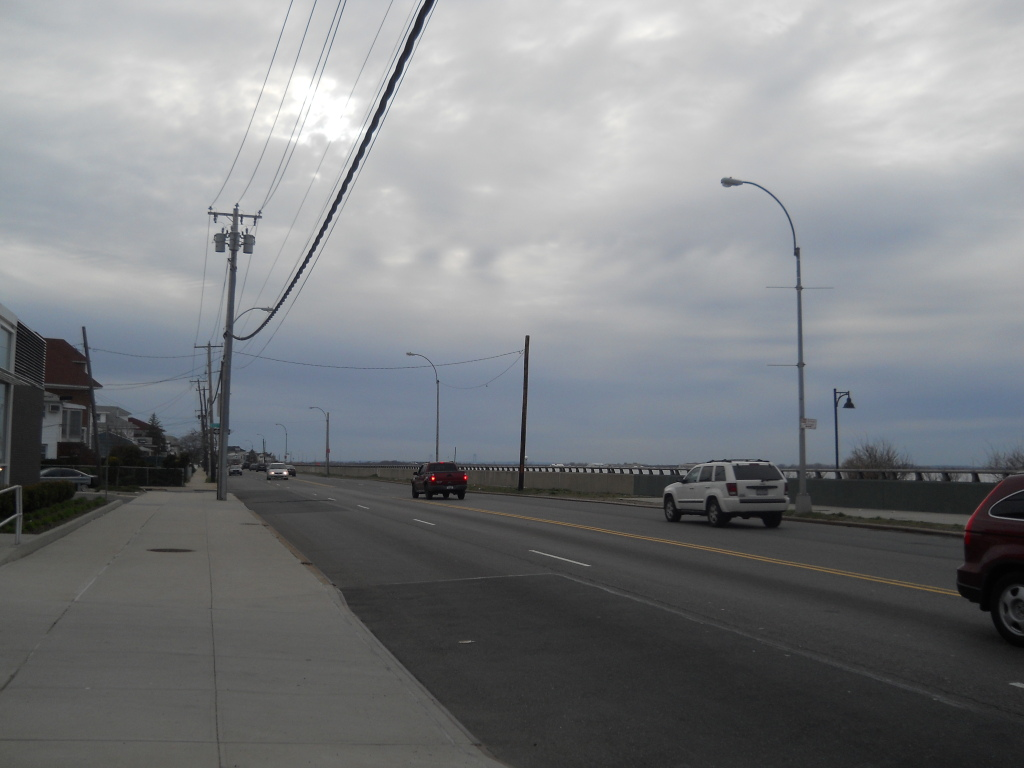
- Beach Channel Drive west of Beach 116th Street in Rockaway Park
- Owner: City of New York
- Maintained by: NYCDOT
- Length: 8.0 mi (12.9 km)
- Location: Queens
- Postal code: 11697, 11694, 11693, 11692, 11691
- Nearest metro station: Rockaway Line
- West end: Rockaway Point Boulevard / Marine Parkway Bridge in Roxbury
- Major junctions: Cross Bay Bridge in Rockaway Beach
- East end: Sheridan Boulevard in Inwood
- South: Rockaway Freeway

Beach Channel Drive is the main thoroughfare of the Rockaway Peninsula in the New York City borough of Queens. It extends from the Nassau County border at Inwood westward, to the Marine Parkway–Gil Hodges Memorial Bridge at the end of Jacob Riis Park. From Hammels westward, it follows Jamaica Bay on the northern side of the peninsula.

Beach Channel Drive was opened on November 27, 1927, as a relatively short road west of the current site of the Cross Bay Veterans Memorial Bridge. It was later expanded by consolidating a number of existing thoroughfares and constructing some linking roadways.

One of the roads that would become Beach Channel Drive was the launching point for the first transatlantic flight. On May 8, 1919, four United States Navy Navy-Curtis seaplanes took off in Neponsit and headed off to the British colony of Newfoundland, the Azores Islands, and Lisbon, Portugal. On May 31, one of the aircraft, piloted by Lieutenant Commander Albert C. Read, arrived in Plymouth, England.

== Transportation ==
The following bus routes serve Beach Channel Drive:

- The Q22 serves the corridor between Beach 73rd Street and Seagirt Boulevard, along with the QM15 and QM17 providing express service between Far Rockaway or Arverne and Midtown.
- The Elmhurst-bound Q52+ Select Bus Service runs from Beach 54th Street to Beach 59th Street.
- The Q114 provides additional service east of Mott Avenue.

The IND Rockaway Line parallels Beach Channel Drive between both of its termini, Beach 116th Street and Mott Avenue.
