= Jamaica Bay =

Bay on the southern side of Long Island, New York

- Grassy Bay
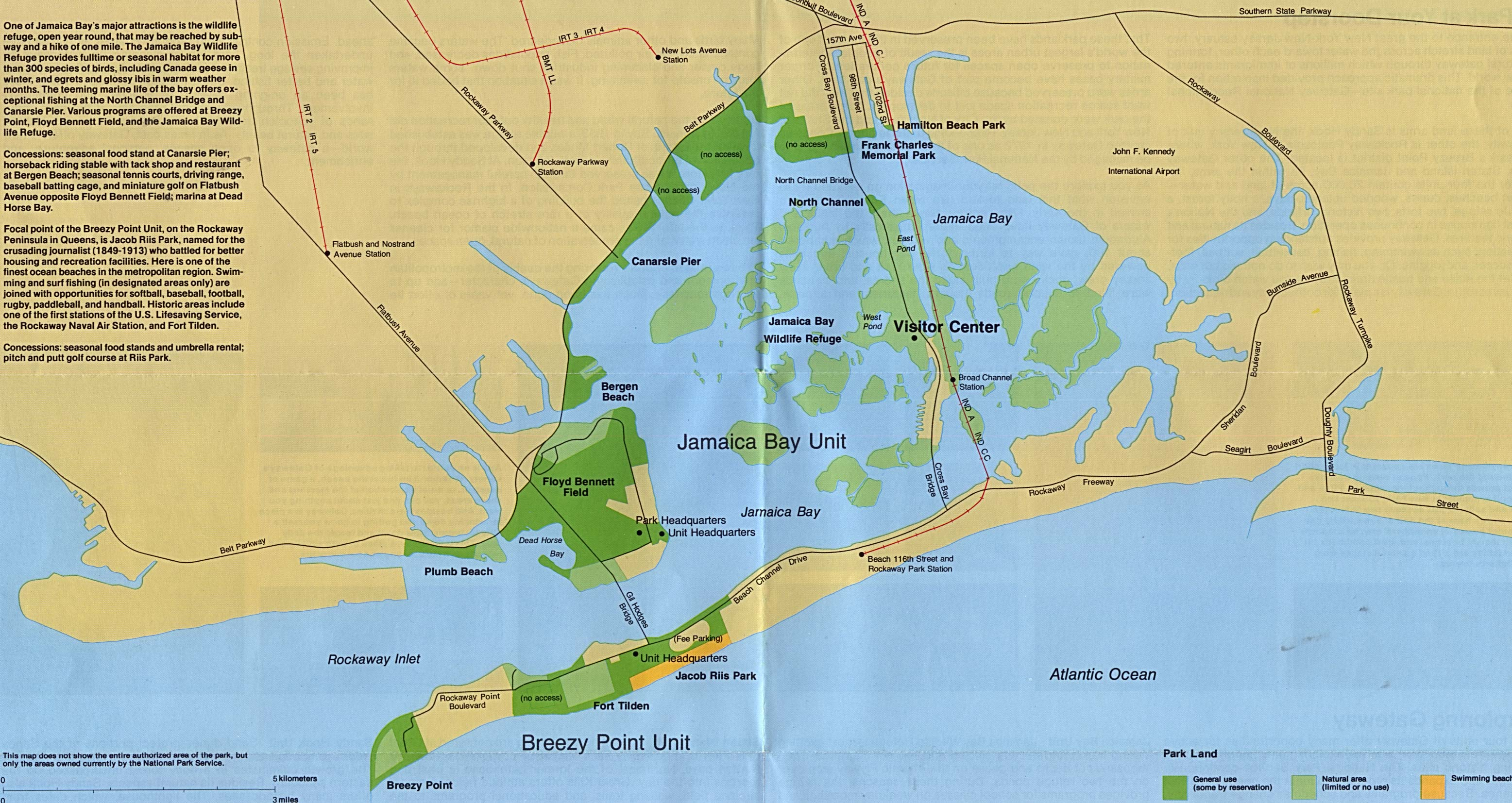
- Map of Jamaica Bay, with subway lines and major roads

- Location within New York City
- Location: New York City and Nassau County
- Coordinates: 40°37′04″N 73°50′33″W
- Etymology: Lenape
- Primary outflows: Rockaway Inlet

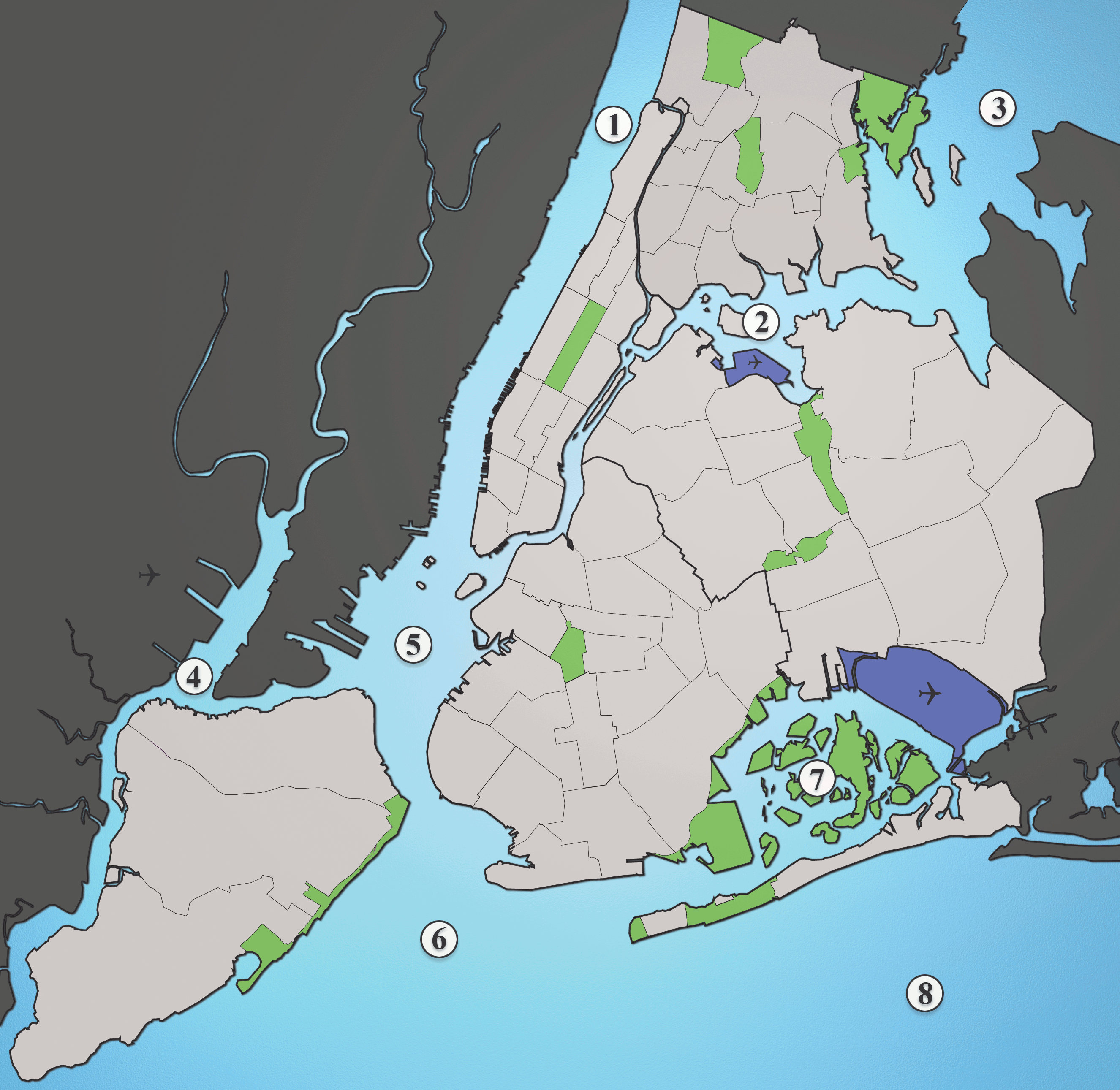
The main waterways surrounding New York City.: 1. Hudson River, 2. East River, 3. Long Island Sound, 4. Newark Bay, 5. Upper New York Bay, 6. Lower New York Bay, 7. Jamaica Bay, 8. Atlantic Ocean

Jamaica Bay (also known as Grassy Bay) is an estuary on the southern portion of the western tip of Long Island, in the U.S. state of New York. The estuary is partially man-made, and partially natural. The bay connects with Lower New York Bay to the west, through Rockaway Inlet, and is the westernmost of the coastal lagoons on the south shore of Long Island. Politically, it is primarily divided between the boroughs of Brooklyn and Queens in New York City, with a small part touching Nassau County.

The bay contains numerous marshy islands. It was known as Grassy Bay as late as the 1940s due to the abundance of eelgrass in the bay, that was wiped out by an epidemic of parasitic Labyrinthula zosterae that took out 90% of the eelgrass in the North Atlantic. Jamaica Bay is located adjacent to the confluence of the New York Bight and New York Bay, and is at the turning point of the primarily east-west oriented coastline of southern New England and Long Island and the north-south oriented coastline of the mid-Atlantic coast.

== Etymology ==
The name derives from the nearby town (now neighborhood) of Jamaica.

== Ecology ==
The location of Jamaica Bay, combined with its rich food resources, make it an important habitat for both plants and animals. This geographic location also provides valuable feeding habitat to marine and estuarine species migrating between the New York Bight and the Hudson River and Raritan River estuaries, and to a diverse community of migratory birds and insects that use the Bay for refueling during transit between summer breeding and overwintering grounds. While the resident wildlife of Jamaica Bay are poorly studied, survey data indicate that Jamaica Bay and the Rockaways support seasonal or year-round populations of at least 325 bird species, more than 100 species of fish, and more than 80 butterfly species.

== Geography ==
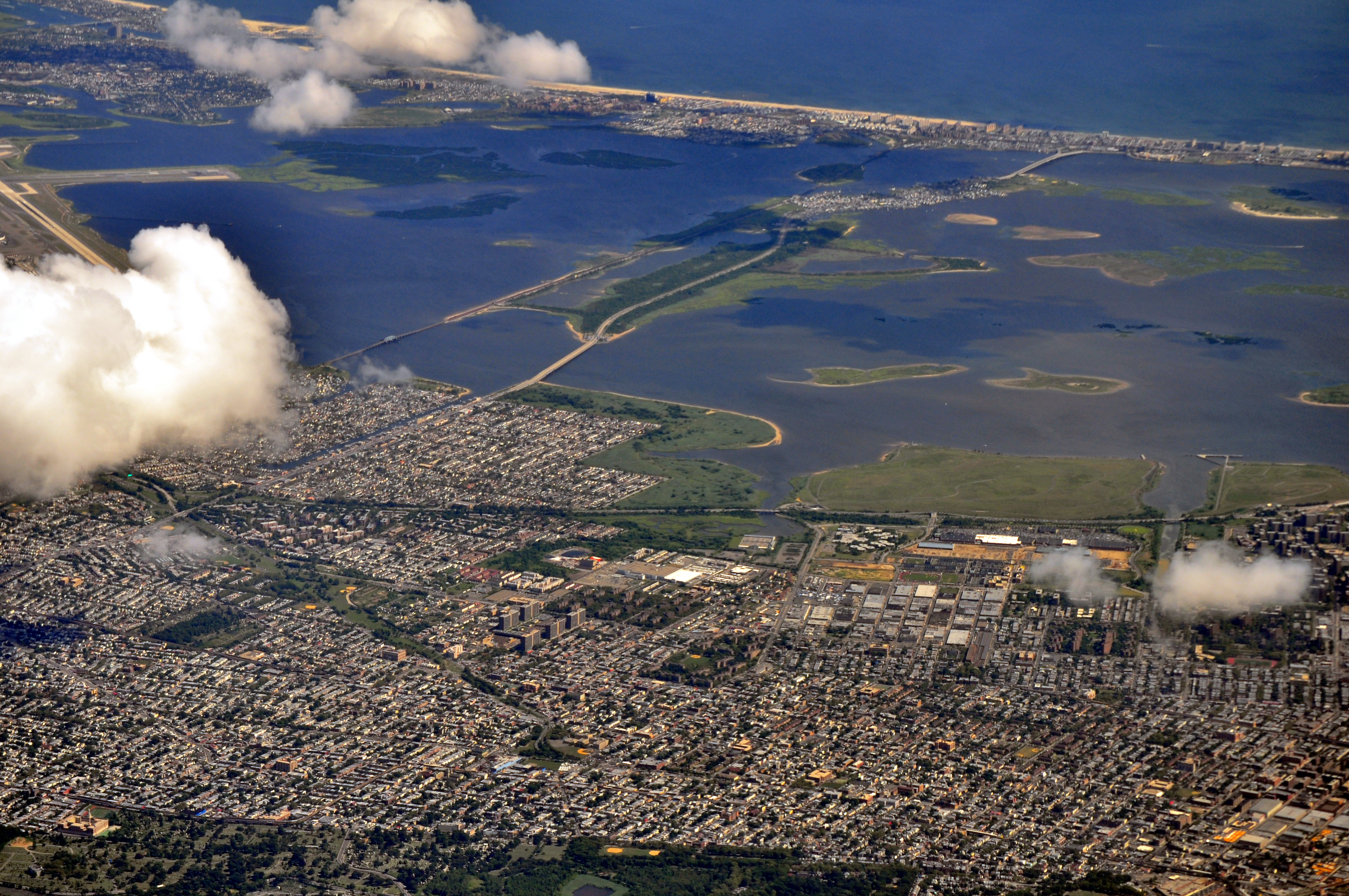
Jamaica Bay from the northwest (2013)

Jamaica Bay is a saline to brackish, eutrophic (nutrient-rich) estuary covering about 25,000 acres (100 km^{2}), with a mean depth of 13 feet (4.0 m), a semidiurnal tidal range averaging 4.9 ft (1.5 m), and a residence time of about three weeks. The bay communicates with Lower New York Bay and the Atlantic Ocean via Rockaway Inlet, a high current area that is 0.6 mi (0.97 km) wide at its narrowest point, with an average depth of 23 ft (7.0 m). Measurements taken during recent surveys in Jamaica Bay indicate average yearly ranges for temperature of 34 to 79 °F (1 to 26 °C), salinity of 20.5 to 26 parts per thousand, dissolved oxygen of 3.5 to 18.5 milligrams/liter, and pH of 6.8 to 9. Loadings of nutrients and organic matter into the bay from sewage treatment plants and runoff result in phytoplankton blooms and high suspended-solid concentrations which, in turn, result in turbid water and low bottom dissolved oxygen concentrations.

Jamaica Bay is in the southern portion of the New York metropolitan area, and the uplands around the bay, as well as much of the Rockaway barrier beach, are dominated by urban residential, commercial, and industrial development. The bay itself has been disturbed by dredging, filling, and development. About 49 square kilometres (19 mi^{2}) of the original 65 square kilometres (25 mi^{2}) of wetlands in the bay have been filled in, mostly around the perimeter of the bay. Extensive areas of the bay have been dredged for navigation channels and to provide fill for the airports and other construction projects. This includes John F. Kennedy International Airport (commonly known as JFK Airport) on the northeastern side of the bay, as well as the historic and now-defunct Floyd Bennett Field on the western side.

The center of the bay is dominated by subtidal open water and extensive low-lying islands with areas of salt marsh, intertidal flats, and uplands important for colonial nesting waterbirds. The average mean low tide exposes 350 acres (1.4 km^{2}) of mudflat, 940 acres (3.8 km^{2}) of low salt marsh dominated by low marsh cordgrass (Spartina alterniflora), and 520 acres (2.1 km^{2}) of high marsh dominated by high marsh cordgrass (Spartina patens). The extensive intertidal areas are rich in food resources, including a variety of benthic invertebrates and macroalgae dominated by sea lettuce (Ulva latuca). These rich food resources attract a variety of fish, shorebirds, and waterfowl. In addition, two freshwater impoundments were created on Rulers Bar Hassock in the Jamaica Bay Wildlife Refuge; the smaller 49 acres (0.20 km^{2}) freshwater West Pond is kept as open water, and the larger 120 acres (0.49 km^{2}) slightly brackish East Pond is controlled to expose mudflats. Some of the islands in the bay have upland communities, including grasslands consisting of little bluestem (Schizachyrium scoparium), switchgrass (Panicum virgatum), and seaside goldenrod (Solidago sempervirens); scrub-shrub containing bayberry (Myrica pensylvanica), beach plum (Prunus maritima), sumac (Rhus spp.), and poison ivy (Toxicodendron radicans); developing woodland consisting of hackberry (Celtis occidentalis), willow (Salix spp.), black cherry (Prunus serotina), and tree-of-heaven (Ailanthus altissima); and beachgrass (Ammophila breviligulata) dune. Species introduced in the refuge to attract wildlife include autumn olive (Elaeagnus umbellata), Japanese black pine (Pinus thunbergii), and Japanese barberry (Berberis thunbergii).

== History ==
=== Seaport proposals ===
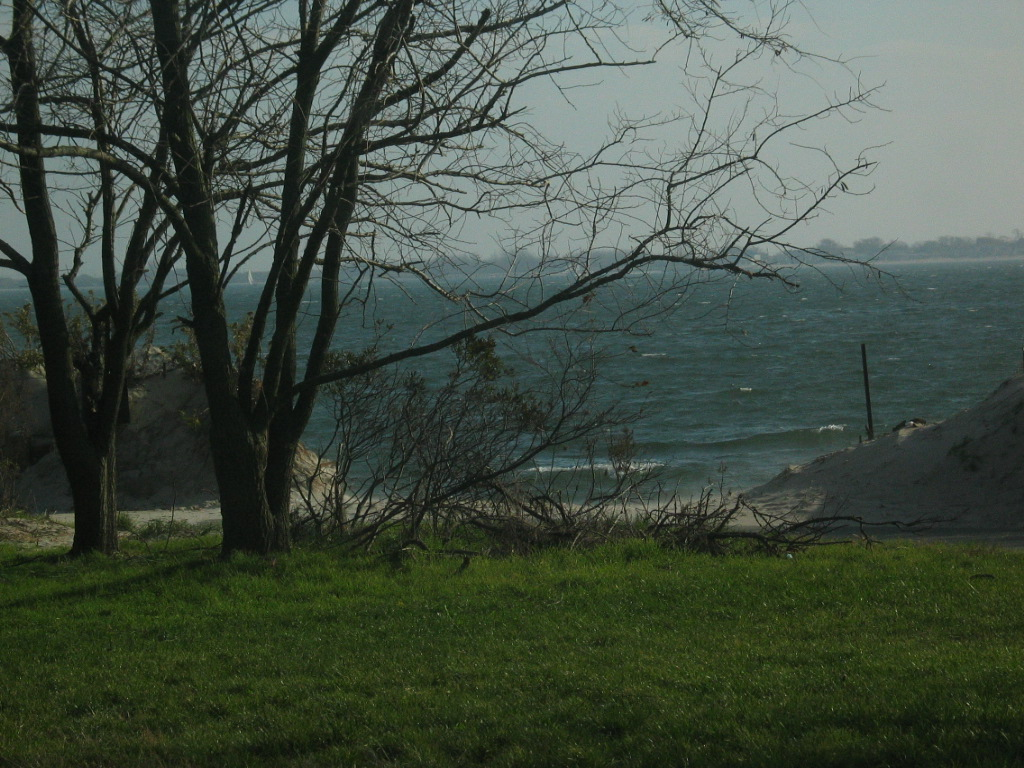
Plumb Beach, Brooklyn

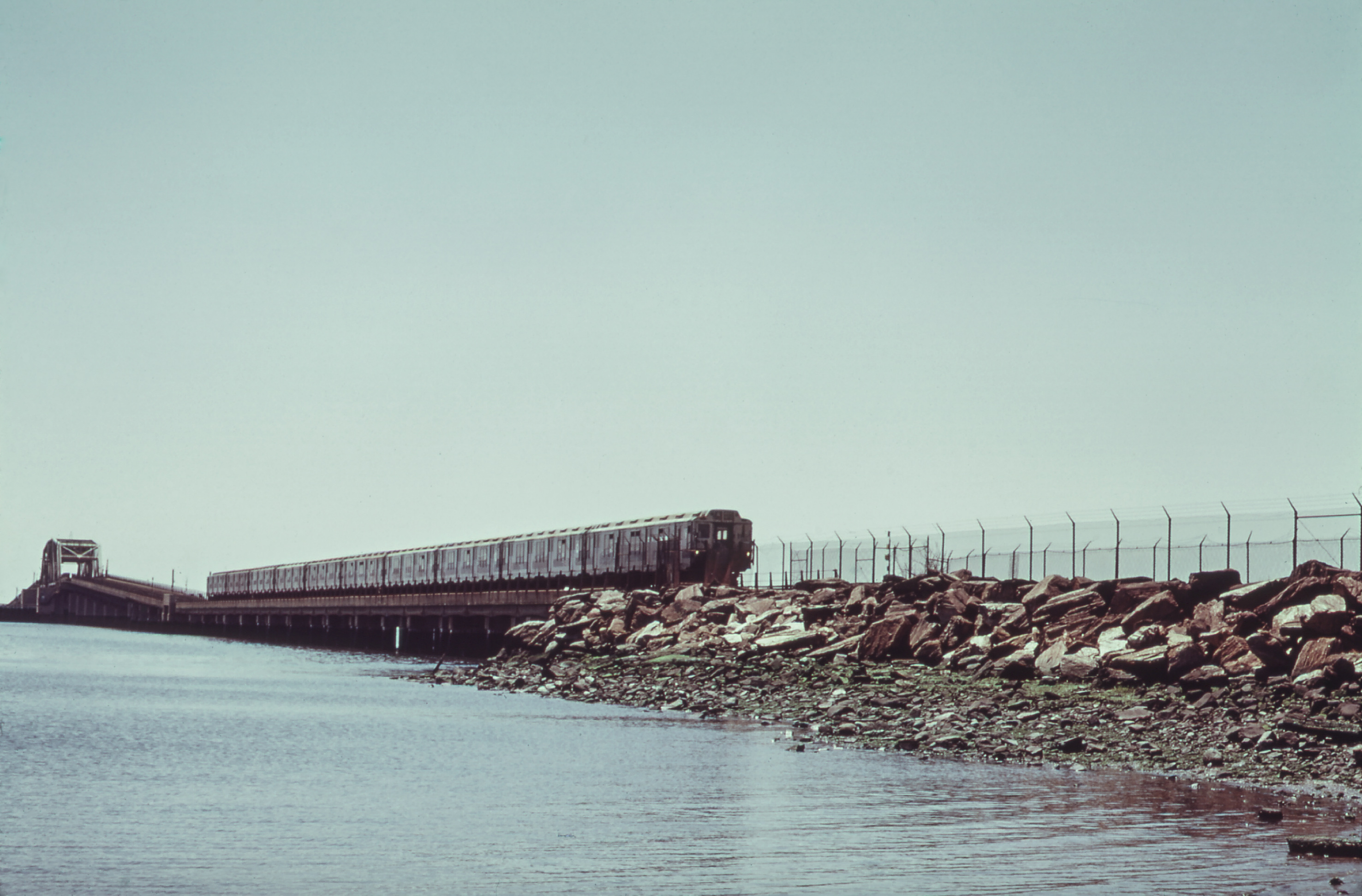
IND Rockaway Line subway train crossing Jamaica Bay, 1973. Photo by Arthur Tress.

Some modifications to Jamaica Bay were conducted in the early 20th century as a result of a never-realized plan to develop Jamaica Bay as a seaport. As early as 1886, the U.S. Engineering Department (a part of the Army Corps of Engineers) had created plans to dredge Rockaway Inlet in preparation for constructing a large seaport in Jamaica Bay. These plans were scrapped because there was not enough commercial traffic to justify the construction. Over the next two decades, commercial activity in New York City increased. New proposals for the Jamaica Bay seaport emerged in the 1900s. By 1905, the value of the city's manufacturing sector was assessed at $1.5 billion, a figure cited by supporters of the Jamaica Bay project.

In 1910, developers unveiled a plan to convert Jamaica Bay to a seaport district as part of the New York State Barge Canal project, which would connect Hudson River to the Great Lakes by way of a new canal in upstate New York. The new seaport would convert existing inland creeks into barge canals with lengths of up to 1.5 miles (2.4 km), and the 25 square miles (65 km^{2}) area of the bay was to be dredged. An aggregate 4,200 acres (1,700 ha) of marshlands in the bay would be converted to land that could be built upon, while residential communities would be built on Long Island for port workers. Railroads would be built to collect cargo from piers, and a canal would extend northward across Long Island to the Long Island Sound.

The project began in 1911, despite doubts about the feasibility of the project. Some engineers believed that shifting sand dunes and the tides in Jamaica Bay might make it impossible to construct the seaport district. The next year, developers began dredging within Jamaica Bay in order to make it navigable for the large vessels that were supposed to use the bay. Significant progress on the dredging had been completed by 1918, and the city allowed the construction of several piers. However, only one pier was built near Barren Island. The pier, which was to receive landfill for the other proposed piers, stretched 1 mile (1.6 km) northeast and was 700 feet (210 m) wide. A total of six such piers were planned for this area. In June 1918, a 447-foot-long (136 m) municipally owned pier was opened at Mill Basin. At the time, there were proposals to fill in 8,000 acres (3,200 ha) between Mill and Barren Islands so 14 more piers could be built. With the United States' entry into World War I, the project was abandoned.

The plans were revived by 1927. At the time, the docklands were expected to gain a connection to the Long Island Rail Road. Planners wanted to create a spur of the Bay Ridge Branch south to Flatlands, with two branches to Canarsie and Mill Basin. A connection to Staten Island would be built via the planned Staten Island Tunnel, which would in turn allow freight to be delivered and shipped to the rest of the continental United States. By 1928, the Barren Island Airport was being constructed on the bay's west shore, and advocates for the seaport project were pushing the city to construct the docklands simultaneously. The Port Authority of New York and New Jersey offered to build the new railroad link for $2 million and lease it to the city. In 1930, the city approved of a report recommending acquisition of a right-of-way for a proposed LIRR branch to Paerdegat Basin. The railroad would connect to the New York Connecting Railroad, which would then connect to the national railroad system at large. Dredging Paerdegat Basin was a key part of the plan, as it would allow easier access for ships headed to Canarsie. As part of the updated proposal, two artificial islands for shipping operations would be built in Jamaica Bay.

In January 1931, the New York City Board of Estimate approved a plan to build railroads on both sides of Paerdegat Basin, connecting the LIRR to Canarsie Pier to the east and to Floyd Bennett Field to the west. By that time, the city had spent $10 million, and the federal government $2 million, toward improving the bay for a proposed seaport district. Supporters of the new proposal included Mayor Jimmy Walker, President of Aldermen Fiorello La Guardia, City Comptroller Charles Berry, and Brooklyn's and Queens' borough presidents. New Jersey opposed the Jamaica Bay project, since it wanted to build the competing Port of Newark. There was enough federal money for both projects, though. However, Robert Moses, the New York City Parks Commissioner at the time, was critical of the seaport project. He instead proposed a series of parks and parkways around New York City, including Belt Parkway along the northern and western shores of Jamaica Bay. Under Moses's leadership, the New York City Department of Parks and Recreation moved to convert much of the Jamaica Bay area into a city park. In 1949, the New York City Board of Estimate approved Moses's proposal, ending all plans for the seaport project. The only thing that was completed was the dredging of Paerdegat Basin to a 16-foot (4.9 m) depth. In the 1950s and 1960s, much of the city-owned land around the basin was sold off to private developers.

=== Incidents ===
On March 1, 1962, American Airlines Flight 1, a Boeing 707, crashed on takeoff from JFK Airport after its rudder jammed. It crashed into Pumpkin Patch Channel, a remote area of marshland on Jamaica Bay that is part of the Jamaica Bay Wildlife Refuge. All 95 people on board were killed, including 87 passengers and 8 crew members.

On November 12, 2001, American Airlines Flight 587, an Airbus A300, crashed after takeoff from JFK Airport after its vertical stabilizer separated in-flight and landed in Jamaica Bay. The aircraft crashed into Belle Harbor, Queens. All 260 people on board were killed, as well as five more people on the ground.

== Environmental conditions ==
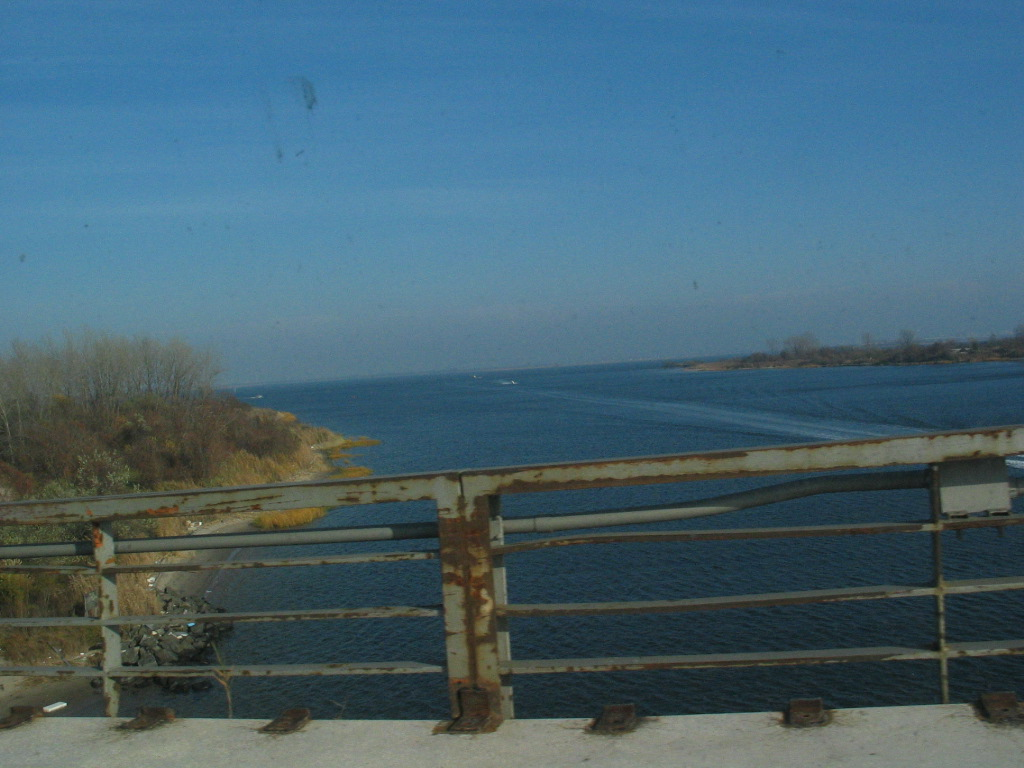
Jamaica Bay seen from Belt Parkway

The salt marshes of Jamaica Bay offer prime habitat for migratory birds and other wildlife. Most of the waters and marshes have been protected since 1972 as part of the Gateway National Recreation Area. Though much improved, pollution is still a problem, and after once enjoying a worldwide reputation for oysters and supporting a vigorous fishing industry the area has been closed to shellfishing since the early 20th century. The marshlands are also fast diminishing.

Within Jamaica Bay, 1,290 acres (520 ha) of marshland disappeared between 1924 and 1974, of which 780 acres (320 ha) was due to land filling and dredging. Another 526 acres (213 ha) disappeared in 1974–1994, and 220 acres (89 ha) was lost during 1994–1999. By 2007, the bay was losing wetlands at a rate of 33 acres (13 ha) a year, nearly twice the rate in 2001. As of 2003, marshland is being lost at the rate of approximately 40 acres (160,000 m^{2}) per year. The reasons for this loss are still unclear, but one hypothesis is that the loss is the result of rising sea levels. To test this, in the hope of preventing further losses, the National Park Service plans to dredge a small area of the bay in order to build up the soil in about 1 acre (4,000 m^{2}) of marsh. Opponents are concerned that the dredging may be harmful, perhaps leading to greater loss of marshland than the area saved.

Other scientists suggest that the 3,500 lb (1,600 kg) of nitrogen pouring into the bay every day, 92 percent from four sewage treatment plants ringing the bay, may be partly to blame. They hypothesize that the high levels of nitrogen may stimulate the growth of sea lettuce, smothering other plants. The excess energy may also cause smooth cordgrass to reallocate energy from its roots to its shoots, making it harder for marsh soil to hold together.

The loss of marshlands has also contributed to flooding in communities surrounding the bay. In 2020 alone, surrounding neighborhoods were flooded 15 times; dredging, the loss of marshland, and global sea-level rise contributed to the flooding in nearly all of these cases. In an effort to reduce the amount of nitrogen being discharged into Jamaica Bay, the New York City Department of Environmental Protection announced the installation of enhanced treatment measures. An innovative technology, called the Ammonia Recovery Process, is now being designed by ThermoEnergy Corporation, which will further reduce nitrogen discharges from the bay by 3,000 pounds per day by 2014.

== Ownership and protection status ==
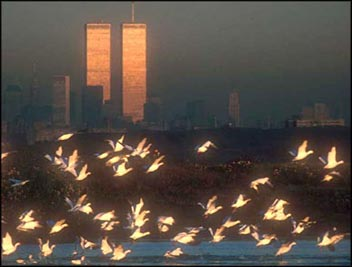
The old World Trade Center seen from Jamaica Bay

The majority of land and water within this complex is owned by the United States federal government, and the city of New York. Most of Jamaica Bay proper and portions of the uplands and barrier beach are part of the Gateway National Recreation Area's Jamaica Bay Unit. Administered by the National Park Service, the Jamaica Bay Unit includes the 9,100 acres (37 km^{2}) of Jamaica Bay Wildlife Refuge, as well as Breezy Point Tip, Fort Tilden, Jacob Riis Park and Floyd Bennett Field. There are two state parks at Jamaica Bay, Shirley Chisholm, and Bayswater Point.

There are several city parks within the bay complex, including Marine Park, Spring Creek Park and Rockaway Community Park, and numerous smaller parcels of city-owned land such as Tribute Park and Sunset Cove at Broad Channel. Portions of the wetlands and uplands are part of JFK Airport, owned by the city of New York and operated by the Port Authority of New York and New Jersey. Occasionally the airport becomes a route of migration of some wildlife species disrupting the traffic. Small areas in the upland buffer around the bay and on the Rockaway Peninsula remain in private residential or commercial ownership.

Jamaica Bay has been designated and mapped as an otherwise protected beach unit pursuant to the federal Coastal Barrier Resources Act, prohibiting incompatible federal financial assistance or flood insurance within the unit. The New York State Natural Heritage Program, in conjunction with The Nature Conservancy, recognizes two Priority Sites for Biodiversity within the Jamaica Bay and Breezy Point habitat complex: Breezy Point (B2 – very high biodiversity significance) and Fountain Avenue Landfill (B3 – high biodiversity significance). Jamaica Bay and Breezy Point have been designated as Significant Coastal Fish and Wildlife Habitats by the New York State Department of State, and the bay up to the high tide line was designated as a Critical Environmental Area by the New York Department of Environmental Conservation. Jamaica Bay was also designated as one of three special natural waterfront areas by the New York City Department of City Planning. A comprehensive watershed management plan for the bay was completed in 1993 by the New York City Department of Environmental Protection in order to better protect and restore habitats and improve water quality. Wetlands are regulated in New York under the state's Freshwater Wetlands Act of 1975 and Tidal Wetlands Act of 1977. These statutes are in addition to federal regulation under Section 10 of the Rivers and Harbors Act of 1899, Section 404 of the Clean Water Act, and various Executive Orders.

== Science and Resilience Institute at Jamaica Bay ==
In 2012, the City of New York and the National Park Service signed an agreement to jointly manage Jamaica Bay and restore its parkland and greenspaces. Hurricane Sandy hit the city in force in October 2012, causing billions of dollars of damage, and inundating coastal regions, including Jamaica Bay, with a storm surge estimated at close to 2.5 meters. The impact of Hurricane Sandy revealed the vulnerability of the city's coastal infrastructure to storm surges, and with projections suggesting that the frequency of such storms is likely to increase over the coming century, New York City released "A Stronger, More Resilient New York" in June 2013, an extensive report outlining a plan to reinforce and rebuild NYC infrastructure in order to create a city better able to withstand future storms. Later that year, Mayor Bloomberg, together with the then Secretary of the Interior Sally Jewell, announced the establishment of the Jamaica Bay Science and Resilience Institute, a multidisciplinary consortium of academic, governmental and community partners coordinated by the City University of New York. The Institute, subsequently renamed the Science and Resilience Institute at Jamaica Bay (SRIJB), is currently housed at Brooklyn College, but will be relocating to a permanent home at Floyd Bennett Field within the next 3 years.

== See also ==
- Beach Channel Drive, a drive along the Rockaways that borders the Jamaica Bay shore
- Cross Bay Veterans Memorial Bridge, a bridge connecting the Rockaway Peninsula to Howard Beach and mainland Queens
- Geography of New York City
- Geography of New York–New Jersey Harbor Estuary
- Marine life of New York–New Jersey Harbor Estuary
- Ruffle Bar, island in Jamaica Bay
