= Maple Grove Cemetery (Queens) =

Cemetery in New York City

- U.S. National Register of Historic Places
- U.S. Historic district
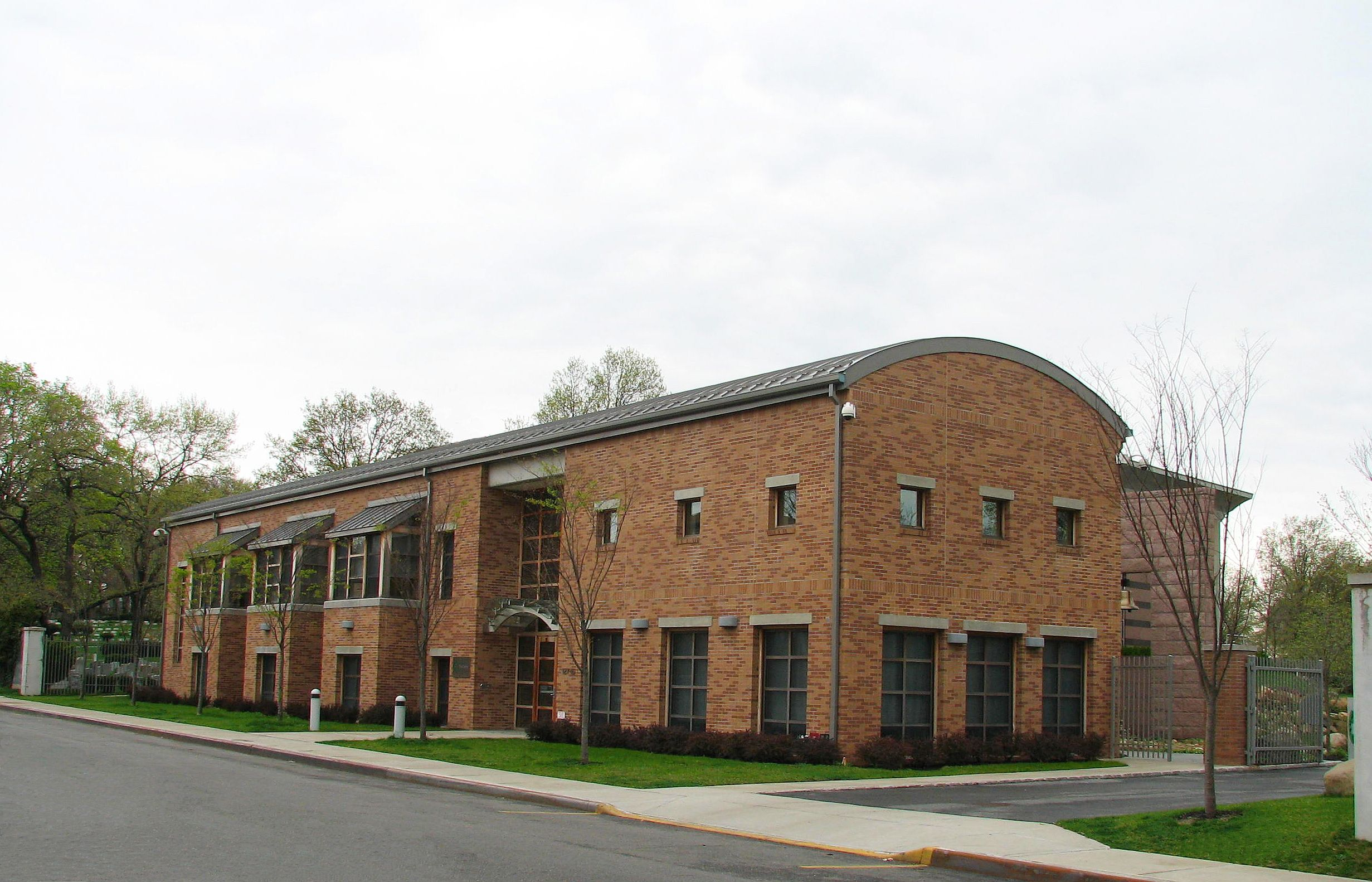
- The Center at Maple Grove Cemetery on Kew Gardens Road. It houses the Maple Grove Offices, Celebration Hall, Community Room etc.

- Location within New York City Location within New York Location within the United States
- Location: 127-15 Kew Gardens Road, Briarwood, New York
- Coordinates: 40°42′31″N 73°49′27″W
- Area: 65 acres (26 ha)
- Built: 1875
- Architect: Ware, James E.; McClure, George W., and Son and Gisolfi, Peter
- NRHP reference No.: 04000874
- Added to NRHP: August 20, 2004

Maple Grove Cemetery is a 65-acre (26 ha) cemetery at 127-15 Kew Gardens Road in the Briarwood and Kew Gardens neighborhoods of Queens in New York City, New York, U.S. Founded in 1875, it was added to the National Register of Historic Places in 2004.

== History ==
Maple Grove is a 65-acre cemetery established in 1875 on the "Backbone of Long Island" by Colonel William Sterling Cogswell and business associates. It consists of two sections; Monumental Park and Memorial Park. The Victorian Era Monumental Park was the first section opened in 1875 and laid out in the rural cemetery tradition with panoramic winding roads through a forest covered hilly terrain, with the original entrance at Queens Boulevard. The Lodge Building, located at the Queens Boulevard entrance, and the Receiving Tomb were erected in 1875. The Victorian Administration Building was erected in 1880 at the Lefferts Boulevard and Kew Gardens Road Entrance. All were designed by noted New York City architect James E. Ware (1846–1918).

The Memorial Park section was opened in 1943. The Lodge was torn down and the original Queens Boulevard Entrance was moved further south on Queens Boulevard, next to Briarwood subway station (E, F, and <F> trains). Memorial Park's Presidential Circle includes a memorial to the 21 people interred at Maple Grove who died in the 2001 terrorist attack on the World Trade Center. There are approximately 83,000 interments, with approximately 30,000 of them in the Monumental Park section. In Memorial Park the new Center at Maple Grove building, designed by architect Peter Gisolfi, was opened in 2009. The Maple Grove offices were moved from the old Victorian Administration Building into the center. It also houses the Celebration Hall, Community Room, the Columbarium etc. A third entrance was created next to the Center on Kew Gardens Road at 129th Street.

== Friends of Maple Grove ==
The Friends of Maple Grove Cemetery, Inc. is a not-for-profit, membership organization with the purposes of supporting and enhancing the operations of Maple Grove Cemetery, located in Kew Gardens, Queens, New York. Friends members desire to increase public knowledge and appreciation of the artistic, historical, horticultural and cultural resources of the Cemetery. The Friends promotes ties between Maple Grove Cemetery and the community it serves and sponsors a variety of programs and activities.

== Notable interments ==
- LaVern Baker (1911–1997), rhythm-and-blues singer
- Albert H. Bosch (1908–2005), member of the US House of Representatives
- Martin Branner (1888–1970), cartoonist
- George W. Corliss (1834–1903), soldier, Civil War Congressional Medal of Honor recipient
- Leslie Kaliades (1961–1999), artist known for her photography about her experience with AIDS
- Anthony Mason (1966–2015), basketball player
- Irving Rapper (1898–1999), film director
- Jimmy Rushing (1901–1972), singer
- George Coles Stebbins (1846–1945), gospel hymn writer
- Fred Taral (1867–1927), U.S. Racing Hall of Fame jockey
- James E. Ware (1846–1918), architect
- Edward Wright, (1829–1901), sailor, Civil War Congressional Medal of Honor recipient
- Vincent Youmans (1898–1946), songwriter
- Octavia St. Laurent (1964–2009), Actress, Singer
