= Sutphin Boulevard station (IND Queens Boulevard Line) =

New York City Subway station in Queens

Sutphin Blvd
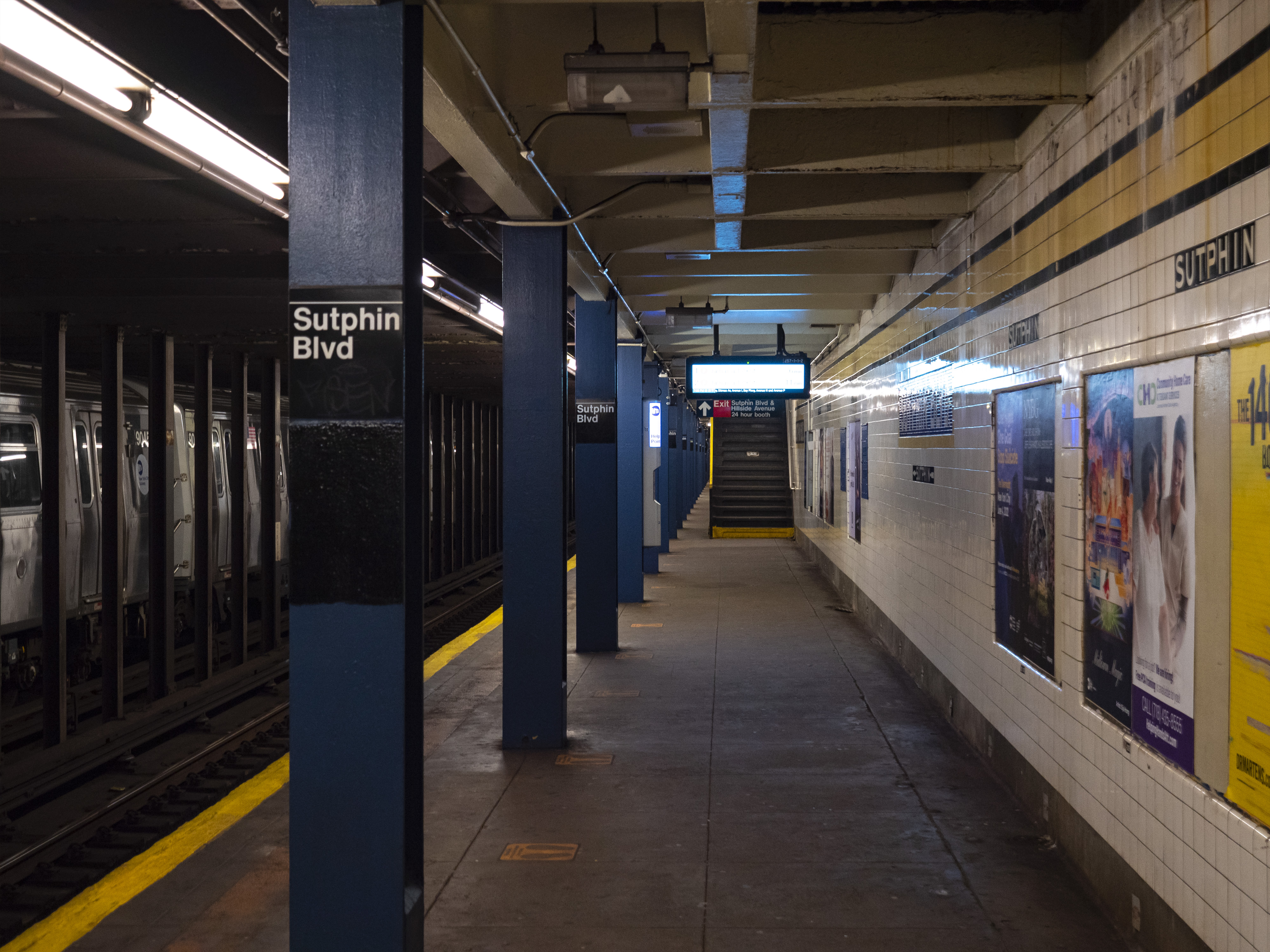
- Northbound platform

Station statistics
- Address: Sutphin Boulevard & Hillside Avenue; Queens, New York
- Borough: Queens
- Locale: Jamaica, Briarwood
- Coordinates: 40.705726°N 73.809714°W
- Division: B (IND)
- Line: IND Queens Boulevard Line
- Services: F (all times) <F> (two rush hour trains, reverse peak direction)
- Transit: NYCT Bus: Q1, Q43, Q44 SBS; MTA Bus: Q40
- Structure: Underground
- Platforms: 2 side platforms
- Tracks: 4

Other information
- Opened: April 24, 1937 (89 years ago)

Traffic
- 2025: 985,516 ▲2.2%
- Rank: 313 out of 423
Services
Preceding station	New York City Subway	Following station
Briarwood F <F> toward Coney Island–Stillwell Avenue	Local	Parsons Boulevard F <F> toward Jamaica–179th Street
Location
Location within New York City Subway
Location within New York City
Location within New York
Track layout
Street map
Station service legend
Symbol	Description
Stops all times	Stops all times
Stops rush hours in the peak direction only (limited service)	Stops rush hours in the peak direction only (limited service)

The Sutphin Boulevard station is a local station on the IND Queens Boulevard Line of the New York City Subway. Located at Sutphin Boulevard and Hillside Avenue on the border of Jamaica and Briarwood in Queens, it is served by the F train at all times, the <F> train during rush hours in the reverse peak direction, and a few rush-hour E trains to Jamaica–179th Street during p.m. rush hours.

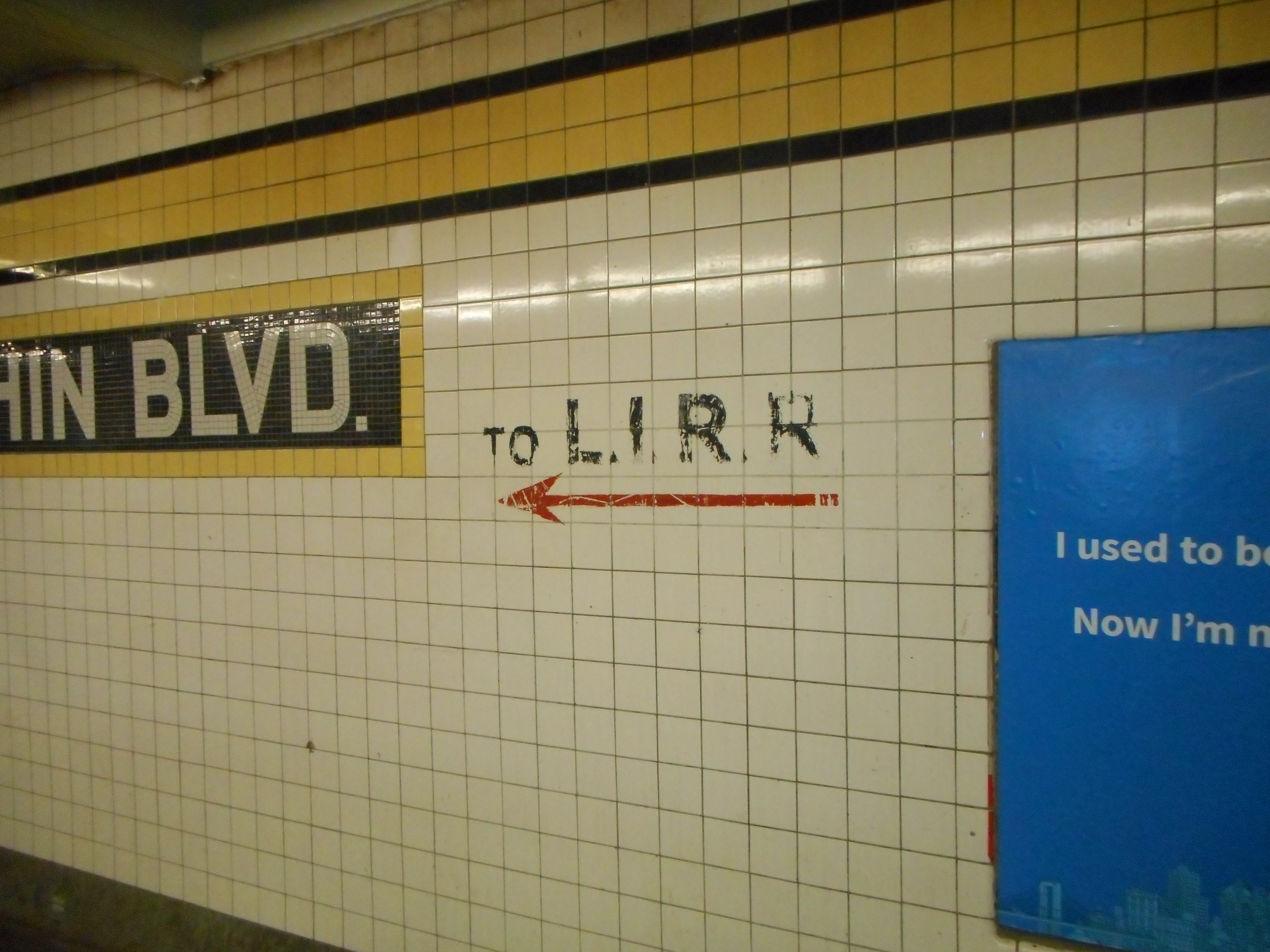
A red-painted arrow at the station directing riders to the Long Island Rail Road

This station opened on April 24, 1937 as part of an extension of the Independent Subway System's Queens Boulevard Line. In 1953, the platforms at the station were extended to accommodate 11-car trains. Ridership at this station decreased sharply after the opening of the Archer Avenue lines in 1988. This had been the closest subway station to the Long Island Rail Road's Jamaica station after the removal of a portion of the Jamaica Elevated in 1977.

== History ==
=== Construction ===
The Queens Boulevard Line was one of the first built by the city-owned Independent Subway System (IND), and was planned to stretch between the IND Eighth Avenue Line in Manhattan and 178th Street and Hillside Avenue in Jamaica, Queens. The line was first proposed in 1925. Construction of the line was approved by the New York City Board of Estimate on October 4, 1928. On December 23, 1930, the contract for the construction of the section between 137th Street (now the Van Wyck Expressway) and 178th Street—Route 108, Section 11—was let. This section included the stations at 169th Street, Parsons Boulevard, Sutphin Boulevard, and Briarwood. As planned, Parsons Boulevard was to be an express stop, while the other three stations, including Sutphin Boulevard, would be local stops. The contract for this section was awarded to Triest Contracting Corporation. The line was constructed using the cut-and-cover tunneling method, and to allow pedestrians to cross, temporary bridges were built over the trenches.

The first section of the line opened on August 19, 1933 from the connection to the Eighth Avenue Line at 50th Street to Roosevelt Avenue in Jackson Heights. Later that year, a $23 million loan was approved to finance the remainder of the line, along with other IND lines. The remainder of the line was built by the Public Works Administration. In summer 1933 work on this station and 169th Street were completed, far ahead of schedule. In 1934 and 1935, construction of the extension to Jamaica was suspended for 15 months and was halted by strikes. Construction was further delayed due to a strike in 1935, instigated by electricians opposing wages paid by the General Railway Signal Company.

In August 1936, tracks were installed all the way to 178th Street, and the stations to Union Turnpike were completed. The stops to the east, including Sutphin Boulevard, still needed to be tiled and did not have stairways, turnstiles and lighting installed. Two additional contracts remained to be put up for bid, both the results of last minute changes; one such contract involved moving the eastern terminal from 178th to 169th Street. In addition, a new tunnel roof and new side supports had to be constructed. A 3.5-mile (5.6 km) extension from Roosevelt Avenue to Kew Gardens opened on December 31, 1936. In March 1937, the extension to 169th Street was expected to be opened on May 1, requiring work to be finished by April 3, and fully approved and tested by April 20. As of this point, minor station work remained, including the installation of light bulbs, with the only major work left to be completed being the final 200 feet (61 m) of track in the 169th Street terminal.

=== Opening ===
On April 9, 1937, Mayor Fiorello La Guardia announced that the operation of the $14.4 million extension to Jamaica and express service would begin on April 24. The extension to Hillside Avenue and 178th Street, with a terminal station at 169th Street, opened as planned on April 24, 1937. Service was initially provided by E trains, which began making express stops from 71st–Continental Avenues to Queens Plaza during rush hours on the same date, and by EE local trains during non-rush hours. The express service operated between approximately 6:30 and 10:30 a.m. and from 3:00 p.m. to 7:00 p.m., and ran every three to five minutes. This extension was celebrated with a ribbon-cutting ceremony at the Parsons Boulevard station and with a parade along Hillside Avenue. On December 15, 1940, F trains began running via the newly opened IND Sixth Avenue Line and along the Queens Boulevard Line's express tracks; they skipped the Sutphin Boulevard station.

=== Changes ===
In 1953, the platforms at six Queens Boulevard Line stations, including Sutphin Boulevard, were lengthened to allow eleven-car trains. Originally, service was provided with ten-car trains. (Note: The subway cars on the IND were built to be 60 feet (18.3 m) long. These cars typically operated in 10-car trains, with an entire train length being 600 feet (182.9 m). When platforms at stations such as Sutphin Boulevard were lengthened to accommodate 11-car trains, the platforms had to be extended an additional car length, or 60 feet (18.3 m), making the platform at least 660 feet (201.2 m) long.) The New York City Board of Transportation had announced plans in November 1949 to spend $325,000 extending platforms at several IND stations, including 75th Avenue, to accommodate 11-car trains; the bid for the project went out in 1951. The project was estimated to be completed in 18 months. The lengthened trains began running during rush hour on September 8, 1953. Eleven-car trains would only operate on weekdays. The extra car increased the total carrying capacity by 4,000 passengers. The lengthening project cost $400,000. The operation of eleven-car trains ended in 1958 because of operational difficulties. The signal blocks, especially in Manhattan, were too short to accommodate the longer trains, and the motormen had a very small margin of error to properly platform the train. It was found that operating ten-car trains allowed for two additional trains per hour to be scheduled.

Until the opening of the Sutphin Boulevard–Archer Avenue station on the Archer Avenue lines on December 11, 1988, this was the closest subway station to the Long Island Rail Road's Jamaica station. The opening of the Archer Avenue lines was expected to severely lessen congestion at the Sutphin Boulevard, Parsons Boulevard, and 169th Street stations. Ridership checks conducted before and after the opening of the new line showed that ridership at this station, between 5 and 10 a.m. on weekdays, decreased from 7,282 riders to 2,610 riders, a 64% decrease.

In conjunction with the opening of the Archer Avenue lines, service patterns were changed. E trains were rerouted via the new line, running to Jamaica Center, via the Queens Boulevard Line's express tracks, and began running express east of 71st Avenue. Some E trains continued to run from 179th Street as expresses during the morning rush hour. Service at local stations, such as Sutphin Boulevard, was replaced by the R, which was extended to 179th Street from Continental Avenue. The R extension allowed F trains to continue running express to 179th Street. The changes in subway service angered riders at local stations east of 71st Avenue because they lost direct Queens Boulevard Express service. Local elected officials pressured the MTA to eliminate all-local service at these stations. On September 30, 1990, the R was cut back to 71st Avenue outside of rush hours. Local service to 179th Street was replaced by F trains, which provided Queens Boulevard Express service, during middays, evenings, and weekends, and local G service during late nights. In 1992, the MTA decided to have F trains run local east of 71st Avenue on a six-month trial basis to replace R service, which would be cut back to 71st Avenue at all times. The test started on October 26, 1992 and was implemented on a permanent basis six months later, eliminating express service along Hillside Avenue.

In 2003, Metropolitan Transportation Authority proposed closing 177 part-time token booths, later reduced to 62, across the subway system and replace them with MetroCard Vending Machines and High-Entry/Exit Turnstiles to help cut the MTA's $1 billion deficit. The closure of booths began in August 2003. The station's part-time token booth at 144th Street was closed on August 17, 2003, and automatic entrance to the 144th Street exits was provided at all times.

== Station layout ==
This underground station has four tracks and two side platforms. The F train stops here at all times, as do two weekday-evening E trains to Jamaica–179th Street. The station is between Briarwood to the west and Parsons Boulevard to the east. The two center express tracks are used by the limited rush hour E service to Jamaica–179th Street. Some of the black columns separating the local and express tracks have white signs reading "Sutphin" in black lettering.

Both platforms have a yellow trim line with a black border and mosaic name tablets reading "SUTPHIN BLVD." in white sans-serif lettering on a black background and yellow border. The tile band is part of a color-coded tile system used throughout the IND. The tile colors were designed to facilitate navigation for travelers going away from Lower Manhattan. As such, a different tile color is used at Parsons Boulevard, the next express station to the east. The yellow tiles used at the Sutphin Boulevard station were also used at Kew Gardens–Union Turnpike, the next express station to the west, and Briarwood, the only other local station between Union Turnpike and Parsons Boulevard. Small "SUTPHIN" and directional tile captions run below the trim line and name tablets.

Blue I-beam columns run along both platforms at regular intervals with alternating ones having the standard black station name plate in white lettering. At the northern end of the station, there are a few wider columns that are tiled. The I-beam piers are located every 15 feet (4.6 m) and support girders above the platforms. The roof girders are also connected to columns in the walls adjoining each platform. This station has a full length mezzanine above the platforms and tracks supported by blue I-beam columns, and allows for free crossovers between directions.

The tunnel is covered by a U-shaped trough that contains utility pipes and wires. The outer walls of this trough are composed of columns, spaced approximately every 5 feet (1.5 m) with concrete infill between them. There is a 1-inch (25 mm) gap between the tunnel wall and the platform wall, which is made of 4-inch (100 mm)-thick brick covered over by a tiled finish. The columns between the tracks are also spaced every 5 feet (1.5 m), with no infill.

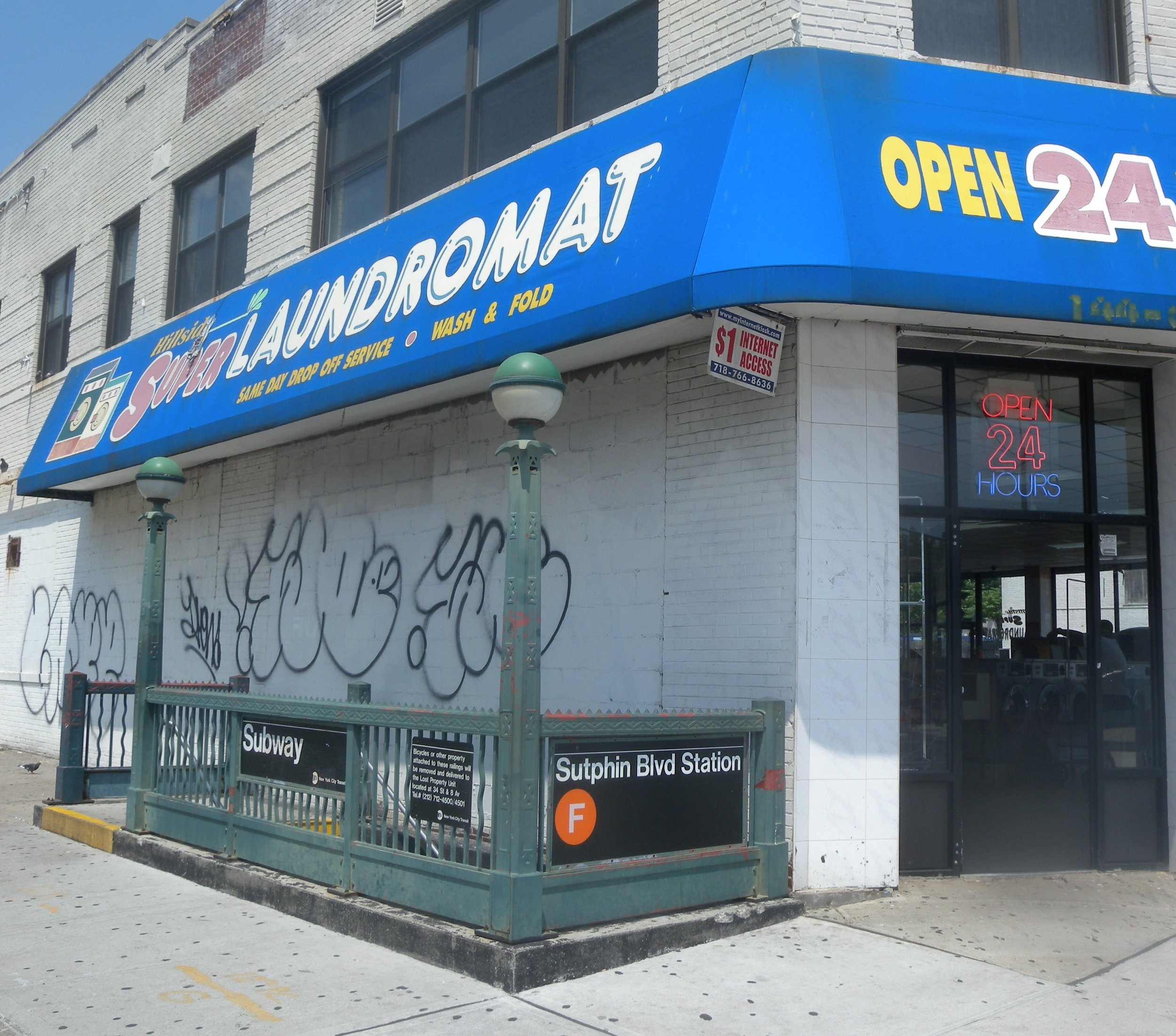
144th Street stair

=== Exits ===
The main fare control area, formerly the station's full-time entrance, is at the east (railroad north) end. It has a turnstile bank, full-time token booth, and three street stairs; in 2007, the turnstile bank consisted of five regular turnstiles, a High Entry-Exit Turnstile, and a high exit-only turnstile. Two stairs ascend to either southern corner of the T-intersection of Sutphin Boulevard and Hillside Avenue, and the other to the northwest corner of 148th Street and Hillside Avenue. On the opposite side of the full-time turnstile bank, there was an unstaffed fare control area that has a single staircase going down to each platform and is now gated off. The staircase to the Manhattan-bound platform is closed (directional mosaic signs still exist), but the one to the 179th Street-bound platform remains open and has an exit-only turnstile.

The other fare control area at the station's west end is unstaffed, containing just full-height turnstiles; in 2007, this fare control area contained two High Entry-Exit Turnstiles and two high exit-only turnstiles. There are two street stairs going up to the southwest and northeast corners of 144th Street and Hillside Avenue. Its part-time token booth was removed in 2003.

== In popular culture ==
In the movie Coming to America, Eddie Murphy's character, Akeem, tries to persuade his love interest to marry him and go to Zamunda, a fictional kingdom in Africa. He follows her onto a New York City Subway train. When the train stops, she tells him "no" and gets off. Akeem stays on, dejected, and as the train leaves the station, "Sutphin" can be seen on the wall tiles.

== See also ==
- Sutphin Boulevard station (BMT Jamaica Line)
- Sutphin Boulevard–Archer Avenue–JFK Airport station
