= 169th Street station (IND Queens Boulevard Line) =

New York City Subway station in Queens

169 Street
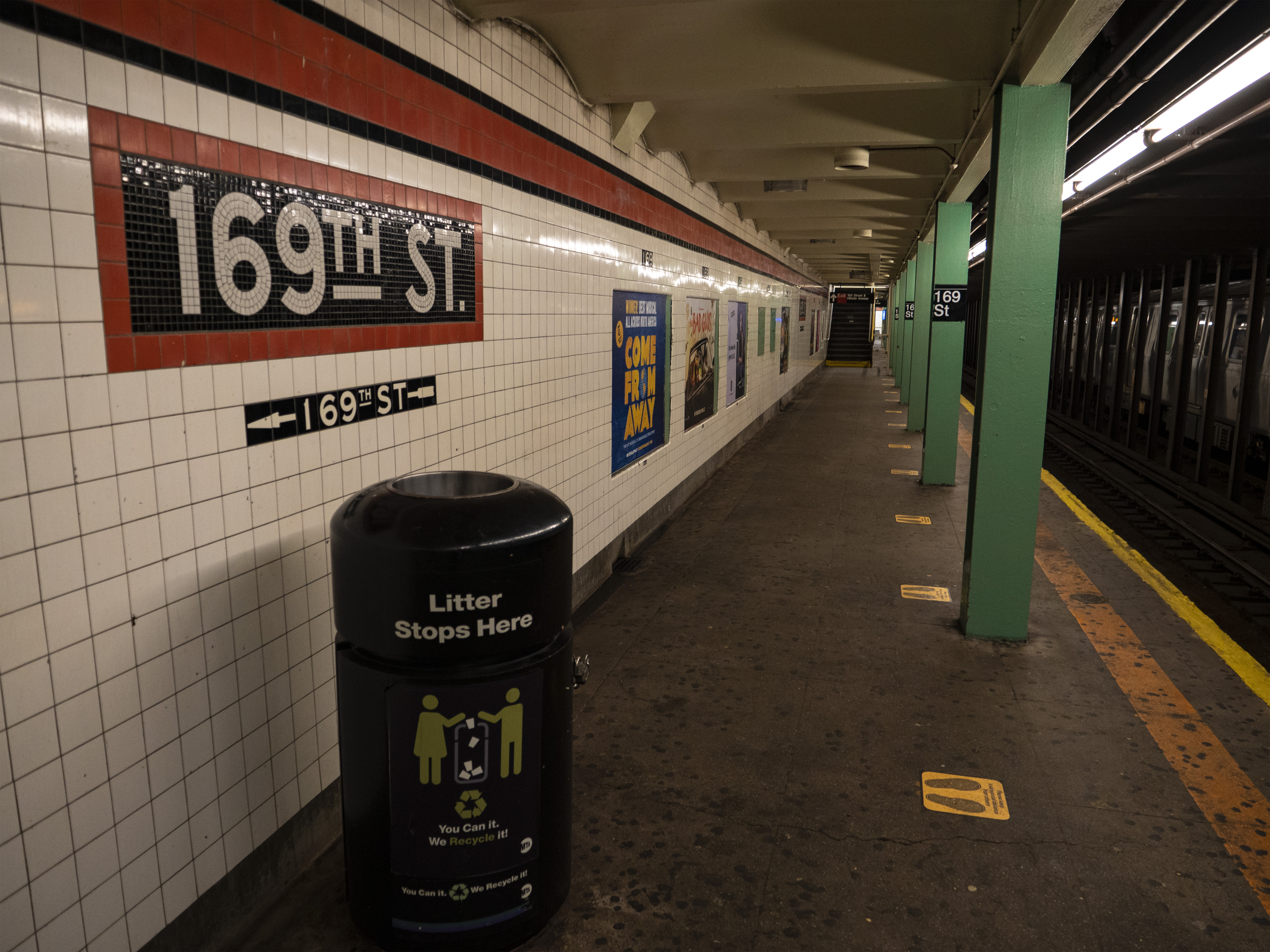
- Northbound platform

Station statistics
- Address: 169th Street & Hillside Avenue; Queens, New York
- Borough: Queens
- Locale: Jamaica, Jamaica Hills
- Coordinates: 40.710638°N 73.793063°W
- Division: B (IND)
- Line: IND Queens Boulevard Line
- Services: F (all times) <F> (two rush hour trains, reverse peak direction)
- Transit: NYCT Bus: Q1, Q2, Q3, Q17, Q30, Q31, Q36, Q43, Q75, Q76, Q77, Q82; NICE Bus: n1, n6, n6X, n22, n22X, n24, n26
- Structure: Underground
- Tracks: 4

Other information
- Opened: April 24, 1937 (89 years ago)

Traffic
- 2025: 1,761,114 ▲3%
- Rank: 202 out of 423
Services
| Preceding station | New York City Subway | Following station |
|---|---|---|
| Parsons Boulevard F <F> toward Coney Island–Stillwell Avenue | Local | Jamaica–179th Street F <F> Terminus |
Location
Location within New York City Subway
Location within New York City
Location within New York
Track layout
Street map
Station service legend
| Symbol | Description |
| Stops all times | Stops all times |
| Stops rush hours in the peak direction only (limited service) | Stops rush hours in the peak direction only (limited service) |

The 169th Street station is a local station on the IND Queens Boulevard Line of the New York City Subway. Located at the intersection of 169th Street and Hillside Avenue in Queens, it is served by the F train at all times, the <F> train during rush hours in the reverse peak direction, and a few rush-hour E trains to Jamaica–179th Street during p.m. rush hours.

169th Street station opened on April 24, 1937, as the terminal station of the Independent Subway System's Queens Boulevard Line. This station was once heavily used because of the many bus connections available for riders heading further east within Queens. It became the closest subway station to the 168th Street Bus Terminal after the closure and demolition of the nearby 168th Street BMT station on Jamaica Avenue in 1977. Ridership at 169th Street station declined significantly following the opening of the Archer Avenue lines in 1988.

== History ==
=== Construction ===
The Queens Boulevard Line was one of the first built by the city-owned Independent Subway System (IND), and was planned to stretch between the IND Eighth Avenue Line in Manhattan and 178th Street and Hillside Avenue in Jamaica, Queens. The line was first proposed in 1925. Construction of the line was approved by the New York City Board of Estimate on October 4, 1928. On December 23, 1930, the contract for the construction of the section between 137th Street (now the Van Wyck Expressway) and 178th Street—Route 108, Section 11—was let. This section included the stations at 169th Street, Parsons Boulevard, Sutphin Boulevard, and Briarwood. As planned, Parsons Boulevard was to be an express stop, while the other three stations, including 169th Street, would be local stops. The contract for this section was awarded to Triest Contracting Corporation. The line was constructed using the cut-and-cover tunneling method, and to allow pedestrians to cross, temporary bridges were built over the trenches.

The first section of the line opened on August 19, 1933, from the connection to the Eighth Avenue Line at 50th Street to Roosevelt Avenue in Jackson Heights. Later that year, a $23 million loan was approved to finance the remainder of the line, along with other IND lines. The remainder of the line was built by the Public Works Administration. In summer 1933 work on this station and 169th Street were completed, far ahead of schedule. In 1934 and 1935, construction of the extension to Jamaica was suspended for 15 months and was halted by strikes. Construction was further delayed due to a strike in 1935, instigated by electricians opposing wages paid by the General Railway Signal Company.

In April 1936, William Jerome Daly, the secretary of the New York City Board of Transportation, stated, in response to requests for a stop at 178th Street, that constructing a station at that location would prevent express service from operating past 71st Avenue. He said that with a final station at 169th Street, express trains could run to Parsons Boulevard, and that if the line was extended to Springfield Boulevard as planned, express service could be extended past 178th Street with a yard east of the new terminal.

In August 1936, construction to Forest Hills was expected to be completed by the end of the year. While the tracks were installed all the way to 178th Street, the stops to the east of Union Turnpike still needed to be tiled, have stairways, turnstiles and lighting installed. Two additional contracts remained to be put up for bid, both the results of last minute changes. One of the changes concerned the line's eastern terminal. Initially, express trains were planned to terminate at a station at 178th Street. However, the plans were changed to terminate the express trains at Parsons Boulevard, requiring the installation of switches. Since construction of the tunnel was already completed in this section, a few hundred feet of the wall separating the eastbound and westbound train tracks had to be removed to fit the two switches. In addition, a new tunnel roof and new side supports had to be constructed. Since the line's new terminal would be at 169th Street, the tracks at 178th Street would be used to turn back trains. This change delayed the opening of the line from Union Turnpike to 169th Street, and also led to protests from the Jamaica Estates Association because the 178th Street station had been eliminated.

A 3.5-mile (5.6 km) extension from Roosevelt Avenue to Kew Gardens opened on December 31, 1936. In March 1937, the extension to 169th Street was expected to be opened on May 1, requiring work to be finished by April 3, and fully approved and tested by April 20. As of this point, minor station work remained, including the installation of light bulbs, with the only major work left to be completed being the final 200 feet (61 m) of track in the 169th Street terminal.

=== Opening ===
On April 9, 1937, Mayor Fiorello La Guardia announced that the operation of the $14.4 million extension to Jamaica and express service would begin on April 24. The extension to Hillside Avenue and 178th Street, with a terminal station at 169th Street, opened as planned on April 24, 1937. Service was initially provided by E trains, which began making express stops from 71st–Continental Avenues to Queens Plaza during rush hours on the same date, and by EE local trains during non-rush hours. The express service operated between approximately 6:30 and 10:30 a.m. and from 3:00 p.m. to 7:00 p.m., and ran every three to five minutes. This extension was celebrated with a ribbon-cutting ceremony at the Parsons Boulevard station and with a parade along Hillside Avenue.

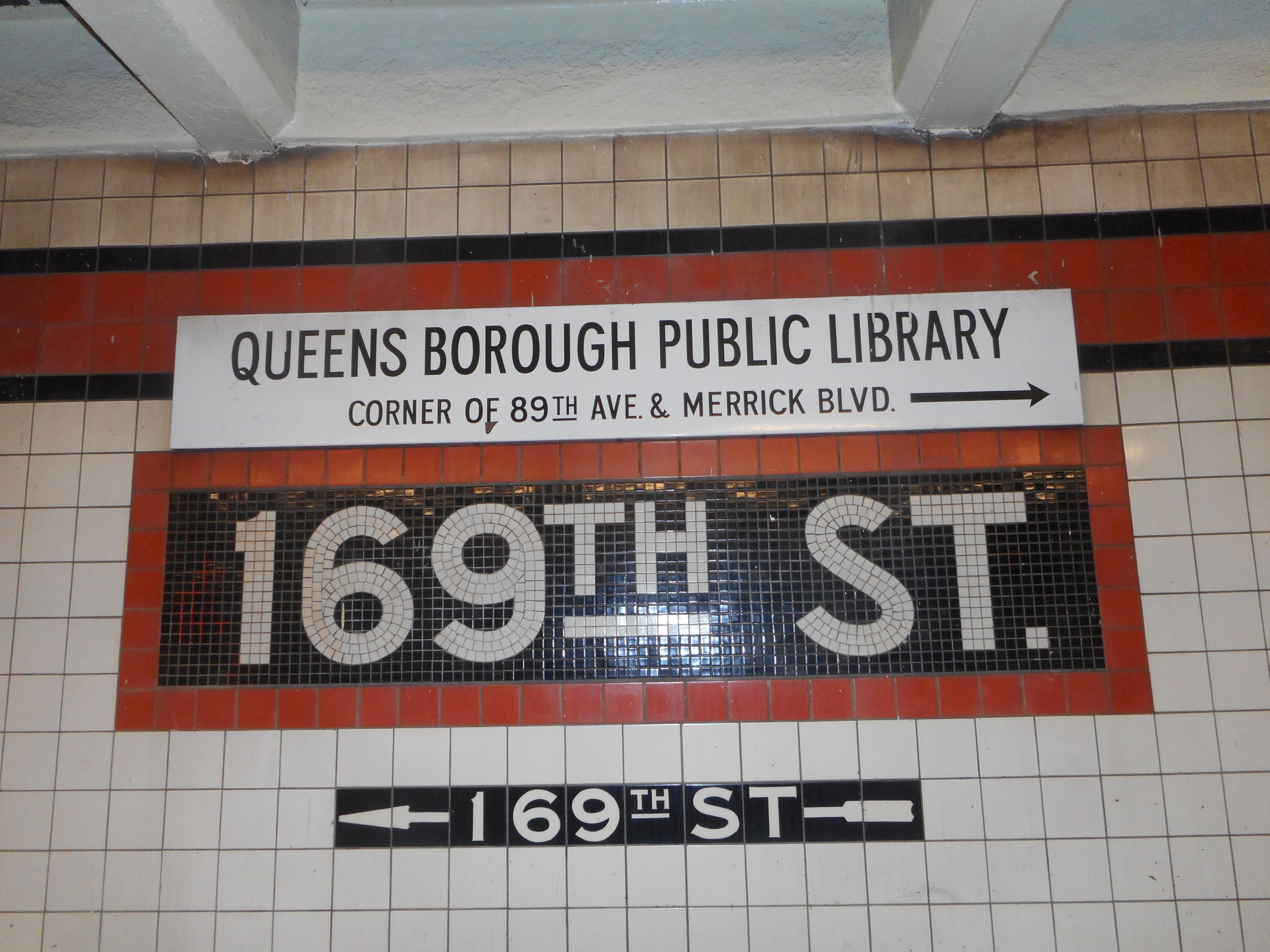
Mosaic name tablet and Queens Public Library sign

On December 15, 1940, F trains began running via the newly opened IND Sixth Avenue Line, also running express west of 71st Avenue. 169th Street and Parsons Boulevard were both used as terminal stations during this time, with the E terminating at this station and the F at Parsons Boulevard. This setup was instituted to prevent congestion at both stations.

While 169th Street was the end of the line, F trains terminated at Parsons Boulevard because the 169th Street station provided an unsatisfactory terminal setup for a four-track line. There were no storage facilities provided at the 169th Street station, and since 169th Street was a local station, trains on the outer local tracks had to cross over to the inner express tracks to reverse direction. Therefore, the line was planned to be extended to 184th Place with a station at 179th Street containing two island platforms, sufficient entrances and exits, and storage for four ten-car trains. The facilities would allow for the operation of express and local service to the station. Delayed due to the Great Depression and World War II, the extension was completed later than expected and opened on December 11, 1950. E trains were extended there at all times and F trains were extended evenings, nights, and Sunday mornings. On May 13, 1951, all F trains outside of rush hour were extended to 179th Street using the local tracks beyond Parsons Boulevard. On October 8, 1951, trains were extended to 179th Street at all times. During rush hours F trains skipped 169th Street running via the express tracks. At other times, the F stopped at 169th Street.

In 1953, the platforms at several IND stations were lengthened to allow eleven-car trains; originally, service was provided with ten-car trains. (Note: The platforms at 75th Avenue and Sutphin Boulevard on the Queens Boulevard Line were lengthened to allow 11-car operation on the E and F routes. The subway cars on the IND were built to be 60 feet (18.3 m) long. These cars typically operated in 10-car trains, with an entire train length being 600 feet (182.9 m). When platforms at stations were lengthened to accommodate 11-car trains, the platforms had to be extended an additional car length, or 60 feet (18.3 m), making the platform at least 660 feet (201.2 m) long.) The lengthened trains began running during rush hour on September 8, 1953. Eleven-car trains would only operate on weekdays. The extra car increased the total carrying capacity by 4,000 passengers. The operation of eleven-car trains ended in 1958 because of operational difficulties. The signal blocks, especially in Manhattan, were too short to accommodate the longer trains, and the motormen had a very small margin of error to properly platform the train. It was found that operating ten-car trains allowed for two additional trains per hour to be scheduled.

=== Archer Avenue extension ===
Before the IND Archer Avenue Line opened on December 11, 1988, all Queens Boulevard express trains (E and F trains) ran to 179th Street, with the E running express along Hillside Avenue during rush hours only and the F running local. At that time, the 169th Street station was considered to be the most congested due to the numerous bus lines that either terminated just outside or at the nearby 165th Street Bus Terminal; this use had increased after the closure and demolition of the nearby 168th Street BMT station on Jamaica Avenue in 1977. The station was ill-equipped to handle the high passenger traffic volume transferring between the buses and subway, and The New York Times stated that during peak hours, passengers had to wait just to get to the platform. As a result, bars were installed on each of the seven 179th Street-bound staircases at platform level to "feed" passengers into the staircases and prevent them from crowding around it.

The opening of the Archer Avenue Line was expected by the New York City Transit Authority to reduce rush hour ridership at this station from 12,912 to 6,058. The locations of the station's full-time and part-time booths were switched in 1988, since more than half of the remaining riders lived closer to the 169th Street entrance. Before the change, most riders came from the Bus Terminal via the 168th Street entrance. The formerly full-time 168th Street booth was made part-time, and the formerly part-time 169th Street booth was made full-time.

== Station layout ==
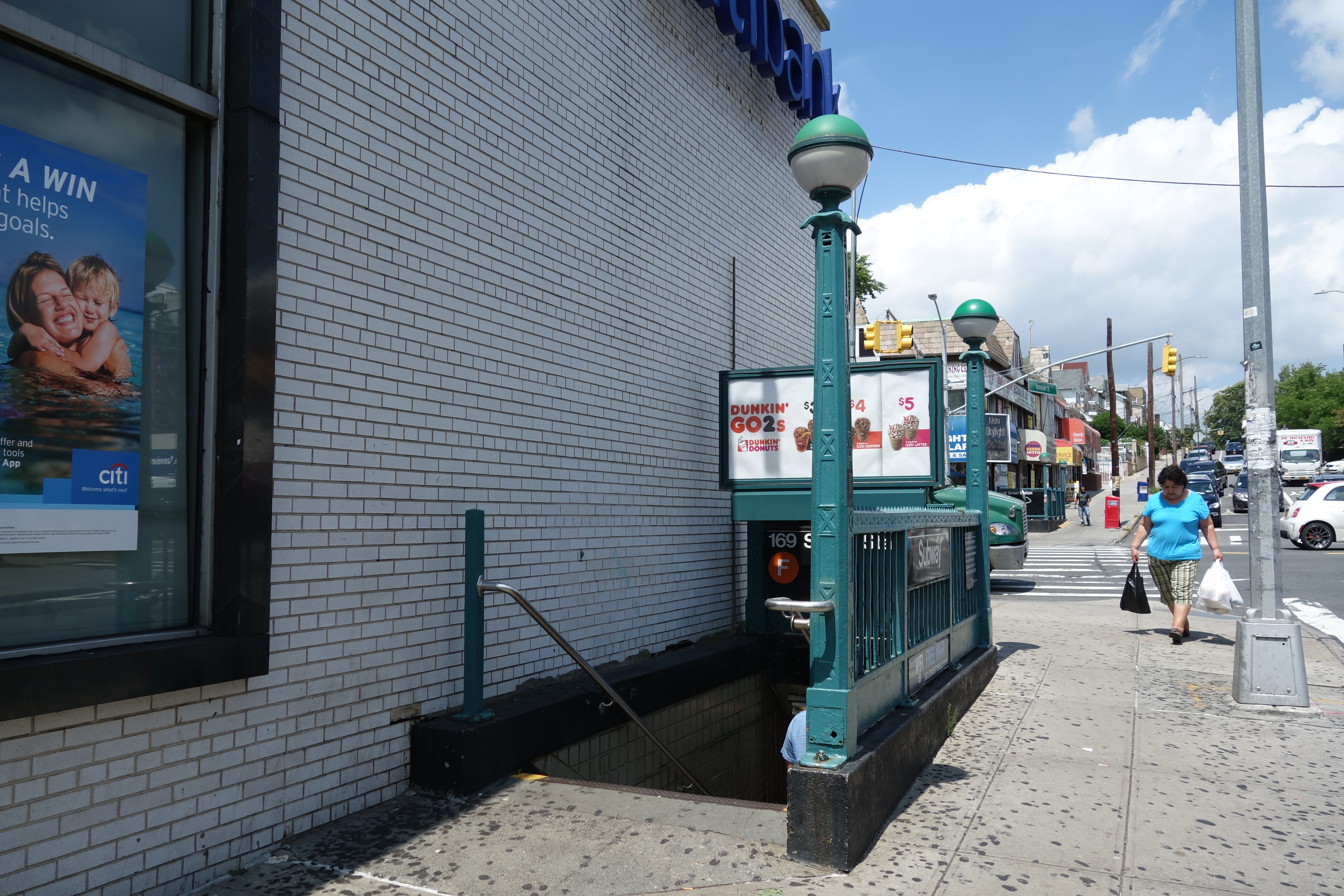
The southwest entrance

This underground station has four tracks and two side platforms. The F train stops here at all times, as do two weekday-evening E trains to Jamaica–179th Street. The station is between Parsons Boulevard to the west and Jamaica–179th Street to the east. The center express tracks are used by the limited rush hour E service to Jamaica–179th Street.

Both platforms have a vermilion trim line with a black border and mosaic name tablets reading "169TH ST." in white sans-serif lettering on a black background with vermilion border. Small "169" and directional tile captions in white lettering on a black background run below the trim line and name tablets. The tile band is part of a color-coded tile system used throughout the IND. The tile colors were designed to facilitate navigation for travelers going away from Lower Manhattan. As such, a different tile color is used at Jamaica–179th Street, the next express station to the east. The red tiles used at the 169th Street station were also used at Parsons Boulevard, the next express station to the west.

Lime green I-beams run along the platforms and mezzanine at regular intervals, alternating ones having the standard black station name plate with white lettering. The I-beam piers are located every 15 feet (4.6 m) and support girders above the platforms. The roof girders are also connected to columns in the walls adjoining each platform.

The station has a full-length mezzanine above the platforms with a crossover between both platforms. When the station opened, IND engineers had concluded that only a small portion of the mezzanine was needed, which led to a 1959 proposal to convert the mezzanine into an underground parking garage. Despite this, the 169th Street station's mezzanines included turnstiles and change booths at both ends, in contrast to several other stations on the same line, which included turnstiles at only one end. Above the Manhattan-bound platform, the mezzanine gets narrower as it makes way for employee space. Due to low clearance, a "DO NOT JUMP" message in black letters is painted on the white tiles of the ceiling above one of the 179th Street-bound staircases.

The tunnel is covered by a U-shaped trough that contains utility pipes and wires. The outer walls of this trough are composed of columns, spaced approximately every 5 feet (1.5 m) with concrete infill between them. There is a 1-inch (25 mm) gap between the tunnel wall and the platform wall, which is made of 4-inch (100 mm)-thick brick covered over by a tiled finish. The columns between the tracks are also spaced every 5 feet (1.5 m), with no infill.

=== Exits ===
There are two fare control areas at either end of the mezzanine. The full-time entrances are at 169th Street, and stairs go up to all four corners of that intersection. As of 2007, the 169th Street turnstile bank consists of six regular turnstiles, two High Entry-Exit Turnstiles, and two high exit-only turnstiles. The 169th Street entrances have been the full-time entrances since 1988, when the Archer Avenue lines opened, dramatically reducing ridership at this station. The part-time entrances are at 168th Street, with stairs going up to all four corners; this was the full-time entrance until 1988. The 168th Street turnstile bank also has six regular turnstiles, two HEETs, and two high exit-only turnstiles. At both entrances, staircases go up to all four corners of the street's intersection with Hillside Avenue. When it was originally built, the station had staffed token booths at both fare control areas. The 169th Street station is the closest to the 168th Street Bus Terminal, though the entrances at 168th Street are closer than those at 169th Street.
