= Briarwood, Queens =

Neighborhood in New York City

Briarwood
- Neighborhood of Queens
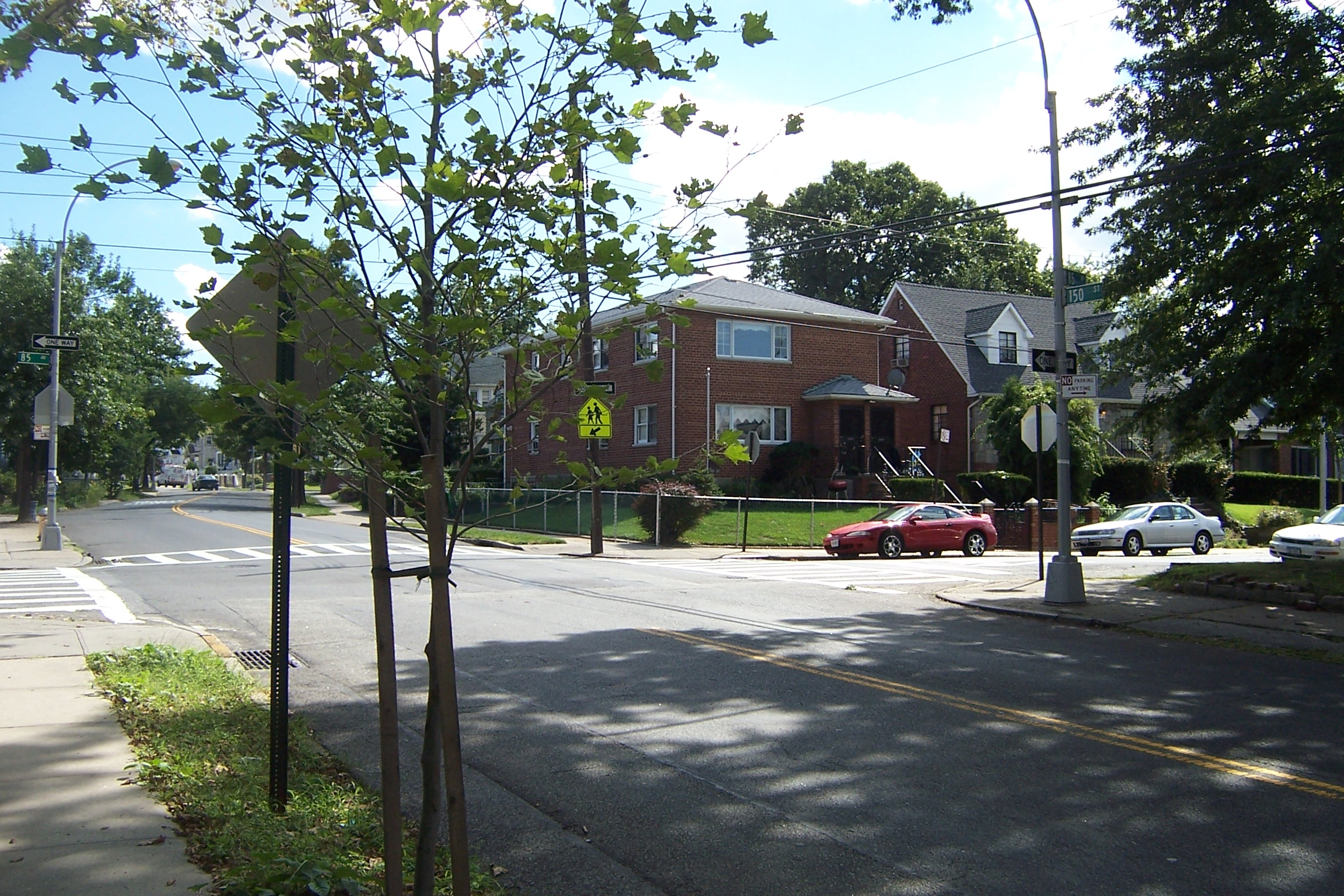
- A residential intersection in Briarwood, 85th Avenue and 150th Street
- Interactive map of Briarwood
- Coordinates: 40.71°N 73.81°W
- Country: United States
- State: New York
- City: New York City
- County/Borough: Queens
- Community District: Queens 8
- Named for: Briarwood Land Company
- Elevation: 36 ft (11 m)

Population (2000)
  - Total: 53,877

Race/Ethnicity
  - White: 26.7%
  - Black: 33.3%
  - Hispanic: 29.3%
  - Asian: 14.4%
  - Other/Multiracial: 16.8%

Economics
  - Median income: $50,157
- ZIP Code: 11435
- Area codes: 718, 347, 929, and 917

Briarwood is a middle-class neighborhood in the New York City borough of Queens. The neighborhood is roughly bounded by the Van Wyck Expressway to the west, Parsons Boulevard to the east, Union Turnpike to the north, and Hillside Avenue to the south.

Briarwood is named for the Briarwood Land Company, headed by Herbert A. O'Brien, who started around 1905 developing the heavily wooded area that gave the neighborhood its name; O'Brien's efforts ended in bankruptcy and development in the area finally started in the 1920s. Today, Briarwood contains a diverse community of Asian-American, White American, Hispanic/Latino, and African American and Afro-Caribbean residents. It is part of Queens Community Board 8.

== Geography ==
Briarwood, located northwest of downtown Jamaica, contains one of the highest points in Queens. It is located approximately between the Van Wyck Expressway (Interstate 678) to the west, Union Turnpike to the north, Parsons Boulevard to the east, and Hillside Avenue (NY 25) to the south.

== Demographics ==
Briarwood is a diverse community, according to 2010 census data that groups Briarwood with neighboring Jamaica Hills, the population consists of Asian-Americans (14.4%), White (26.7%), Hispanics (29.3%), and African Americans (33.3%). This is a marked change from the post-World War II period (1950s–1980s) when the neighborhood was almost exclusively white, with a large and active Jewish community. Economic activity is mostly confined to small restaurants, delis, markets, and other small businesses.

The neighborhood contains housing for middle-class families.

== Education ==
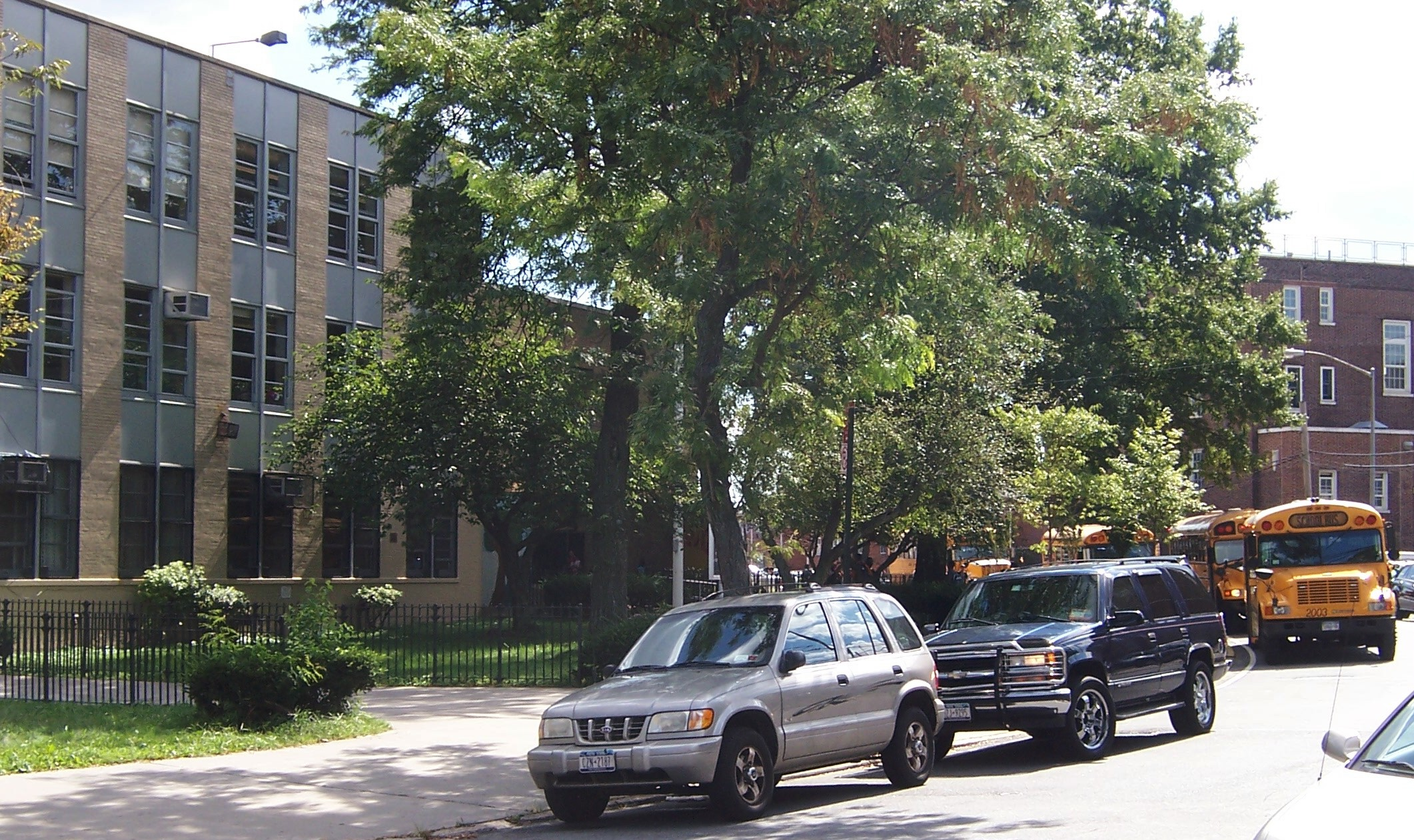
Schools in Briarwood: M.S. Q217 Robert A. Van Wyck and P.S. Q117 J. Keld/Briarwood School

Briarwood is home to the Catholic Archbishop Molloy High School, which moved to Briarwood from the Upper East Side in 1957. Some of the school's more famous alumni are New York Governor Andrew Cuomo, actor David Caruso, former New York City Police Commissioner Raymond Kelly, NBA professional basketball players Kenny Smith and Kenny Anderson and professional wrestler Colin Cassady. Also the infamous Serrao brothers from Richmond Hill, Queens. The school is named in honor of Archbishop Thomas Molloy. It has about 1,550 students.

Also located in Briarwood is Robert A. Van Wyck M.S. 217Q, a middle school of 1,300 students in grades 6–8. The school was established in 1955 and was named after the first mayor of the Greater City of New York, Robert A. Van Wyck, a Tammany Hall lawyer.

== Transportation ==
The neighborhood is served by the IND Queens Boulevard Line of the New York City Subway at the Briarwood station as well as the Sutphin Boulevard and Parsons Boulevard stations (E, F, and <F> trains) along Hillside Avenue, on the border with Jamaica and Jamaica Hills.

In the Briarwood subway station, there were many paintings done by the students of Archbishop Molloy High School, M.S. 217Q, and P.S.117Q during the mid-1980s. They are titled, "Beautifying Briarwood". The paintings were removed during a renovation of the station in 2014.

The New York City Bus routes serving the neighborhood are the Q20, Q25, Q44 SBS, Q60 and QM65.

== History ==
The neighborhood is named for the Briarwood Land Company, headed by Herbert A. O'Brien, which built housing there around 1905 or 1907. O'Brien decided on the name Briarwood because of the brambles in its thick woods. The Ottilie Orphan Home was built on 148th Street in 1906. The Briarwood Land Company went bankrupt soon afterward, however, and the area was largely empty until 1924 when it was divided and sold at auction. Land went for $300 each for inside residential lots to $2,800 for lots along Queens Boulevard. Over the next four years, several single-family homes were built on the land. Briarwood's first school, P.S. 117, was built in 1927. Additional land was auctioned in 1928.

On May 30, 1928, about 500 members of the Klansmen of Queens assembled in the forest of Briarwood. They burned a 50-foot cross, sang songs, and gave speeches. When police officers arrived, the group's leader, Major Emmett J. Smith, said that they had the right to assemble and speak on the land, because they had signed a lease to the land the previous day. The group soon left the area, without any physical violence or arrests having taken place.

In 1936, a company called Briarwood Estates, owned by Leon, Morty and A. B. Wolosoff, started building Colonial and old English-style homes north of 84th Drive and west of Main Street. The homes sold for about $5,000, the equivalent to $116,000 in 2025. After World War II ended, other developers built houses closer to Parsons Boulevard.

Parkway Village, championed by Robert Moses, is a 670-unit development, built as housing for United Nations employees in 1947. Upon opening it housed 2,200 people from over fifty nations. The development is along Union Turnpike, between Main Street and Parsons Boulevard. Parkway Village is now a co-op and no longer connected to the United Nations.

On November 23, 1954, Main Street's extension south to Queens Boulevard opened, and apartments were built in the neighborhood around the same time.

== Notable residents ==
Notable residents of Briarwood have included:

- Ralph Bunche (1904–1971), United States diplomat who received the 1950 Nobel Peace Prize for his mediation in Israel in the late 1940s
- Mario Cuomo (1932–2015) 52nd Governor of New York from 1983–1994
- Betty Friedan (1921–2006), author of The Feminine Mystique, which sparked the second wave of feminism
- Steve Hofstetter (born 1979), radio personality and comedian
- John Kerwin, talk show host of The John Kerwin Show
- Elyakim Rosenblatt (1933–2019), Orthodox Jewish rabbi, who was the founder and rosh yeshiva of Yeshiva Kesser Torah
- Hanna Rosin (born 1970), journalist and author of End of Men and God's Harvard
- Steven Weber (born 1961), actor who appeared on television series, including As the World Turns, Wings, iZombie, and NCIS: New Orleans
- Roy Wilkins (1901–1981), activist in the Civil Rights Movement in the United States from the 1930s to the 1970s
- Sri Chinmoy (1931-2007), spiritual leader, athlete, artist lived and worked in Briarwood for several decades
