= Steve Hofstetter =

American stand-up comedian (born 1979)

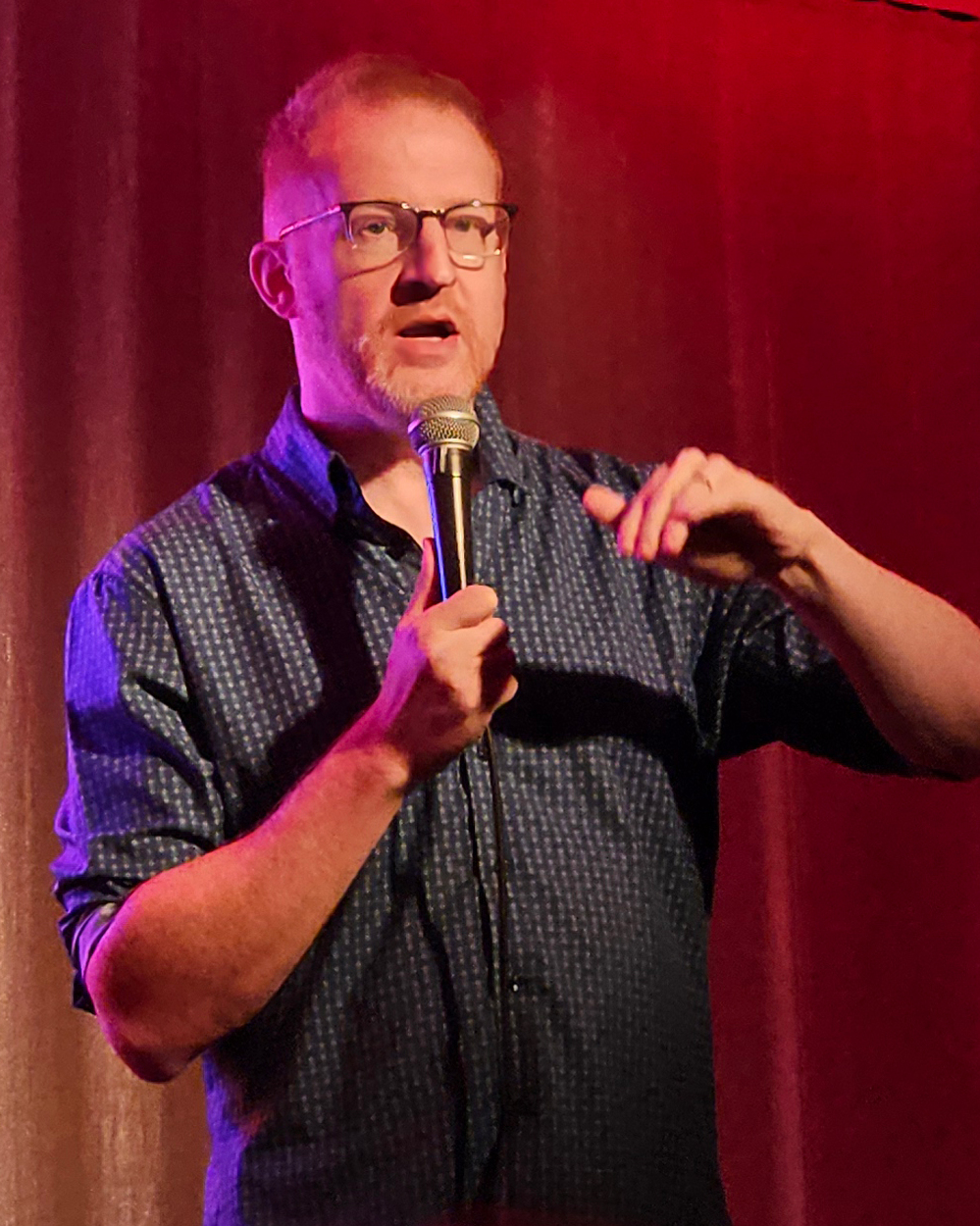
- Hofstetter 2024
- Born: Steven Ira Hofstetter; September 11, 1979 (age 47); Queens, New York, U.S.
- Spouses: Sara Tenenbein (m. 2010; div. 2016); Savannah Martin (m. 2024)

Comedy career
- Years active: 2002–present
- Medium: Stand-up
- Genres: Observational comedy, satire/political satire, social commentary
- Subjects: American culture, American politics, current events, pop culture, religion, foreign policy, ignorance
- Website: stevehofstetter.com

Steven Ira Hofstetter (born September 11, 1979) is an American stand-up comedian and podcast host. As of February 2026, his YouTube channel has accumulated over 976,000 subscribers and over 289,000,000 views. Hofstetter starred in the FS1 special Finding Babe Ruth, has been a panelist on MLB Now on MLB Network, and was the host and executive producer of Laughs on Fox television stations.

Hofstetter has made a number of television appearances, including ESPN's Quite Frankly, Showtime's White Boyz in the Hood, VH1's Countdown, ABC's Barbara Walters Special and CBS's The Late Late Show with Craig Ferguson.

== Early life and education ==
Hofstetter grew up in a Jewish family in the New York City borough of Queens, living at various times in Briarwood, Forest Hills and Rego Park.

He graduated from Hunter College High School in 1997 and received his B.A. from Columbia University's School of General Studies in 2002. There, Hofstetter wrote for the Columbia Spectator and served as President of the Sigma Phi Epsilon fraternity.

== Career ==
Hofstetter gained a reputation by posting videos of interactions with audience members on YouTube, which garnered so many views that Fox Television offered him a series called Laughs, a half-hour showcase for standup comedians, which debuted in August 2014. Shortly after its premiere, SAG/AFTRA issued a "Do Not Work" notice to its members due to Fox's choice to make the show a non-union production. This touched off a controversy about whether all television shows should be union productions.

Hofstetter was the Senior Comedy Correspondent for FOX Sports' Just a Bit Outside.

=== Hofstetter vs. The Cable Guy ===
In March 2006, Hofstetter and Razor & Tie announced the April 4 release of Cure for the Cable Guy, a 45-minute CD/DVD that featured a cover with a Larry the Cable Guy Doll hanging by a co-ax cable. The disc earned Stuff Magazine's "Album cover of the month". Later that week, Larry the Cable Guy's new film debuted and was universally panned. Several movie reviewers discussed Hofstetter's album, including the Orlando Sentinel's Roger Moore. Moore's review was picked up by dozens of papers across the country, including the Chicago Tribune, Denver Post, and Columbus Dispatch. Hofstetter did radio interviews about the album, including one with Philadelphia's Kidd Chris show, where Hofstetter spoke with Larry the Cable Guy's portrayer, Dan Whitney. Whitney ended the interview with his catch phrase, "Git-R-Done."

The album's cover was compared to the Sex Pistols' "Pink Floyd Sucks" T-shirts. Allmusic's Bret Love wrote, "Hofstetter effectively rebels against the mainstream by positioning himself as the antithesis of the world's most popular comedian. What could be more punk rock than that?"

In July, an article in the New Yorker quoted Whitney as saying Hofstetter had been hurtful, and Whitney's manager criticizing Hofstetter for "trying to make a buck". In response, Hofstetter posted a video on YouTube explaining his stance on the Cable Guy and his comedy.

=== Pay-What-You-Want ===
In December 2007, Hofstetter announced his new album, Dark Side of the Room. Customers can download it directly from his website with "Pay-What-You-Want" à la Radiohead's 2007 album In Rainbows.

He has also tried a new model of comedic touring: The Your Tour, where tickets are sold prior to a show that has yet to be announced. Once the city and date are announced, if at least 50 people in the city have purchased tickets, Hofstetter will perform. If not enough people buy tickets, all purchases are refunded.

== Books ==
- Student Body Shots: A Sarcastic Look at the Best 4–6 Years of Your Life
- Student Body Shots – Another Round: More Sarcasm On The Best Four To Six Years Of Your Life
- National Lampoon's Balls! An In Your Face Look at Sports (2007, National Lampoon)
- Ginger Kid: Mostly True Tales from a Former Nerd
- Follow Your Dream (Unless Your Dream Is Stupid) (2022)

== Album and special releases ==
- Tastes Like Bliss (2004, unofficial release)
- Cure for the Cable Guy (2006, Razor & Tie)
- The Dark Side of the Room (2008, Next Round)
- Steve Hofstetter's Day Off (2009, Next Round)
- Pick Your Battles (2011, Next Round)
- Ginger Kid (2015, Next Round)
- Secret Optimist (2017)
- The Recipe (2023)
- Me, Myself, and ID (2024)
- Kill the Butterflies (2025)
