= Briarwood station =

New York City Subway station in Queens

Briarwood
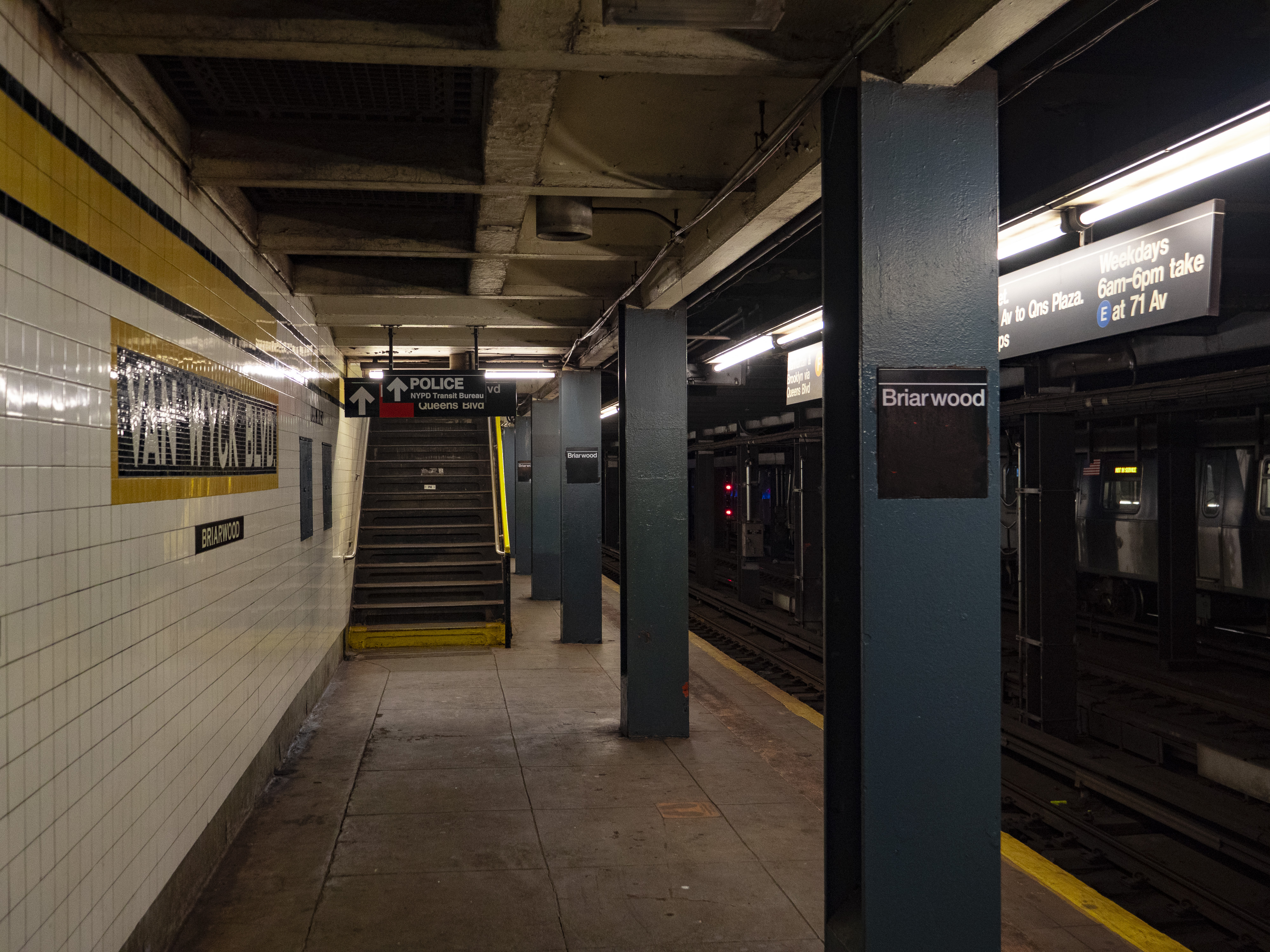
- Southbound platform

Station statistics
- Address: Main Street & Queens Boulevard; Queens, New York
- Borough: Queens
- Locale: Briarwood, Kew Gardens
- Coordinates: 40.70969°N 73.8196°W
- Division: B (IND)
- Line: IND Queens Boulevard Line
- Services: E (nights after 9:00 p.m., weekends, and limited a.m. rush hour trips); F (all times) <F> (two rush hour trains, reverse peak direction)
- Transit: NYCT Bus: Q20, Q44 SBS, QM63, QM64, QM68; MTA Bus: Q60, QM21, QM65
- Structure: Underground
- Platforms: 2 side platforms
- Tracks: 4

Other information
- Opened: April 24, 1937; 89 years ago
- Accessible: Partially; access to mezzanine only, access to platforms under construction
- Accessibility: Same-platform transfer available
- Former/other names: Van Wyck Boulevard (1937–1998); Briarwood–Van Wyck Boulevard (1998–2015)

Traffic
- 2025: 1,147,126 ▲5.3%
- Rank: 287 out of 423
Services
| Preceding station | New York City Subway | Following station |
|---|---|---|
| Kew Gardens–Union Turnpike E F <F> toward Coney Island–Stillwell Avenue | Local | Jamaica–Van Wyck E Archer Ave |
| Kew Gardens–Union Turnpike E F <F> toward Coney Island–Stillwell Avenue | Local | Sutphin Boulevard F <F> toward Jamaica–179th Street |
Location
Location within New York City Subway
Location within New York City
Location within New York
Track layout
Street map
Station service legend
| Symbol | Description |
| Stops all times | Stops all times |
| Stops rush hours in the peak direction only (limited service) | Stops rush hours in the peak direction only (limited service) |
| Stops late nights and weekends | Stops late nights and weekends |

The Briarwood station (formerly the Briarwood–Van Wyck Boulevard station or Van Wyck Boulevard station) is a local station on the IND Queens Boulevard Line of the New York City Subway. Located at the intersection of 84th Drive, Main Street, Queens Boulevard, and the Van Wyck Expressway, in Briarwood, Queens, bordering Kew Gardens, it is served by the F train at all times, the E train at all times except weekday rush hours and middays, and the <F> train during rush hours in the reverse peak direction. There is also a New York City Police Department (NYPD) transit precinct at this station.

This station opened on April 24, 1937, as part of an extension of the Independent Subway System's Queens Boulevard Line. It has been renovated multiple times to accommodate the construction of and modifications to the Van Wyck Expressway.

== History ==
=== Construction ===
The Queens Boulevard Line was one of the first built by the city-owned Independent Subway System (IND), and was planned to stretch between the IND Eighth Avenue Line in Manhattan and 178th Street and Hillside Avenue in Jamaica, Queens. The line was first proposed in 1925. Construction of the line was approved by the New York City Board of Estimate on October 4, 1928. Approval of the section of the Queens Boulevard Line between the intersections of 137th Street (now the Van Wyck Expressway) and Hillside Avenue was held up by a month during late 1929 because of a dispute over a spur that would run south to Rockaway Boulevard. Some property owners wanted the spur to run under Van Wyck Boulevard, while others wanted it to run under Sutphin Boulevard to the east. On December 23, 1930, the contract for the construction of the section between 137th Street and 178th Street—Route 108, Section 11—was let. This section included the stations at 169th Street, Parsons Boulevard, Sutphin Boulevard, and Van Wyck Boulevard. As planned, Parsons Boulevard was to be one of the Queens Boulevard Line's five express stops, as well as one of 22 total stops on the line between Seventh Avenue in Manhattan and 178th Street in Queens. Parsons Boulevard would be the only express stop built as part of Section 11. The contract for this section was awarded to Triest Contracting Corporation. The line was constructed using the cut-and-cover tunneling method, and to allow pedestrians to cross, temporary bridges were built over the trenches.

The first section of the line opened on August 19, 1933, from the connection to the Eighth Avenue Line at 50th Street to Roosevelt Avenue in Jackson Heights. Later that year, a $23 million loan was approved to finance the remainder of the line, along with other IND lines. The remainder of the line was built by the Public Works Administration. In summer 1933 work on this station and 169th Street were completed, far ahead of schedule. In 1934 and 1935, construction of the extension to Jamaica was suspended for 15 months and was halted by strikes. Construction was further delayed due to a strike in 1935, instigated by electricians opposing wages paid by the General Railway Signal Company.

In August 1936, tracks were installed all the way to 178th Street, and the stations to Union Turnpike were completed. However, the stops to the east, including Van Wyck Boulevard, still needed to be tiled and did not have stairways, turnstiles and lighting installed. Two additional contracts remained to be put up for bid, both the results of last minute changes; one such contract involved moving the eastern terminal from 178th to 169th Street. In addition, a new tunnel roof and new side supports had to be constructed. A 3.5-mile (5.6 km) extension from Roosevelt Avenue to Kew Gardens opened on December 31, 1936. In March 1937, the extension to 169th Street was expected to be opened on May 1, requiring work to be finished by April 3, and fully approved and tested by April 20. As of this point, minor station work remained, including the installation of light bulbs, with the only major work left to be completed being the final 200 feet (61 m) of track in the 169th Street terminal.

=== Opening ===
On April 9, 1937, Mayor Fiorello La Guardia announced that the operation of the $14.4 million extension to Jamaica and express service would begin on April 24. The extension to Hillside Avenue and 178th Street, with a terminal station at 169th Street, opened as planned on April 24, 1937. Service was initially provided by E trains, which began making express stops from 71st–Continental Avenues to Queens Plaza during rush hours on the same date, and by EE local trains during non-rush hours. The express service operated between approximately 6:30 and 10:30 a.m. and from 3:00 p.m. to 7:00 p.m., and ran every three to five minutes. This extension was celebrated with a ribbon-cutting ceremony at the Parsons Boulevard station and with a parade along Hillside Avenue. On December 15, 1940, F trains began running via the newly opened IND Sixth Avenue Line and along the Queens Boulevard Line's express tracks; they skipped the Van Wyck Boulevard station.

=== Changes ===
In 1953, the platforms at several IND stations were lengthened to allow eleven-car trains; originally, service was provided with ten-car trains. (Note: The platforms at 75th Avenue and Sutphin Boulevard on the Queens Boulevard Line were lengthened to allow 11-car operation on the E and F routes. The subway cars on the IND were built to be 60 feet (18.3 m) long. These cars typically operated in 10-car trains, with an entire train length being 600 feet (182.9 m). When platforms at stations were lengthened to accommodate 11-car trains, the platforms had to be extended an additional car length, or 60 feet (18.3 m), making the platform at least 660 feet (201.2 m) long.) The lengthened trains began running during rush hour on September 8, 1953. Eleven-car trains would only operate on weekdays. The extra car increased the total carrying capacity by 4,000 passengers. The operation of eleven-car trains ended in 1958 because of operational difficulties. The signal blocks, especially in Manhattan, were too short to accommodate the longer trains, and the motormen had a very small margin of error to properly platform the train. It was found that operating ten-car trains allowed for two additional trains per hour to be scheduled.

In early 1982, in an attempt to cover up empty advertising panels that had been vandalized, students at the nearby PS 117 painted 14 murals at the Van Wyck Boulevard station. After the murals themselves were destroyed by June 1982, the students reinstalled the murals in 1985 and covered them with Plexiglas. The Metropolitan Transportation Authority (MTA) provided funding for the newer murals as part of its Adopt-a-Station program.

==== Archer Avenue changes ====
Before the Archer Avenue lines opened on December 11, 1988, all Queens Boulevard express trains (E and F trains) ran to 179th Street. The E ran express east of 71st Avenue during rush hours only, and the F ran local east of 71st Avenue.

In conjunction with the opening of the Archer Avenue lines, service patterns were changed. E trains were rerouted via the new line, running to Jamaica Center, via the Queens Boulevard Line's express tracks, and began running express east of 71st Avenue. However, some E trains continued to run from 179th Street as expresses during the morning rush hour. Service at local stations, such as Briarwood–Van Wyck Boulevard, was replaced by the R, which was extended to 179th Street from Continental Avenue. The R extension allowed F trains to continue running express to 179th Street. The changes in subway service angered riders at local stations east of 71st Avenue because they lost direct Queens Boulevard Express service. Local elected officials pressured the MTA to eliminate all-local service at these stations. On September 30, 1990, the R was cut back to 71st Avenue outside of rush hours. Local service to 179th Street was replaced by F trains, which provided Queens Boulevard Express service, during middays, evenings, and weekends, and local G service during late nights. In 1992, the MTA decided to have F trains run local east of 71st Avenue on a six-month trial basis to replace R service, which would be cut back to 71st Avenue at all times. The test started on October 26, 1992, and was implemented on a permanent basis six months later, eliminating express service along Hillside Avenue.

In the late 1990s, the Metropolitan Transportation Authority proposed constructing a ventilation shaft near the Van Wyck Boulevard station.

==== 2010s renovations ====
The station's exits were rebuilt during the 2010s as part of the Kew Gardens Interchange reconstruction project, which includes replacement of the Queens Boulevard overpass over Van Wyck Expressway. Ecco won the contract for reconstructing the station's entrance at a cost of $9.9 million. In 2011, the north entrance was demolished as part of the interchange-reconstruction project, leaving the southern exit bordering Maple Grove Cemetery as the sole entrance and exit. A new entrance was built next to Archbishop Molloy High School on Main Street, replacing an exit that had been closed since 2010. Another entrance was built on the south side of Queens Boulevard between the Van Wyck Expressway's service and main roads, across from Maple Grove Cemetery.

The project started in 2010 and was originally supposed to have been completed by 2016, with a new elevator entrance and rebuilt, widened mezzanine corridors. However, delays abounded, including the fact that the new Main Street exit was delayed, having been pushed back from August 2012, to October 2013, and then again to March 2014; lead paint needed to be removed, costing $300,000; and plans were changed during construction, costing $1.7 million. The opening of the new Main Street exit was subsequently pushed forward to February 2014, then back again to May 2014. Work on the elevator was to begin after the new entrance opened; the elevator was to be complete by late 2014 or early 2015. A new staircase entrance, on the northwest corner of Queens Boulevard and Main Street, was opened in December 2014. After the new Main Street entrance opened, the MTA added landscaping, pavement, and sidewalks next to the entrance, and it began constructing an elevator entrance.

The elevator was supposed to have been completed in late 2016, but the MTA also missed this deadline. The delays were caused by the need to install emergency systems; in the meantime, some riders chose to travel 0.5 miles (0.80 km) away to the nearest wheelchair-accessible station, Union Turnpike. The elevator finally opened in May 2017. The elevator runs only between the street and mezzanine, so the station is not ADA-accessible; MTA officials had said that the platform was too narrow to accommodate an elevator. In 2019, the MTA announced that the Briarwood station would become fully ADA-accessible as part of the agency's 2020–2024 Capital Program. The renovation of the station was to be funded by congestion pricing in New York City, but the renovation was postponed in June 2024 after the implementation of congestion pricing was delayed. In December 2024, after congestion pricing was approved, the MTA announced that the elevator installations would proceed. Forte Construction Corp. received a $169 million contract to install elevators at Briarwood and two other stations in December 2025.

== Station layout ==
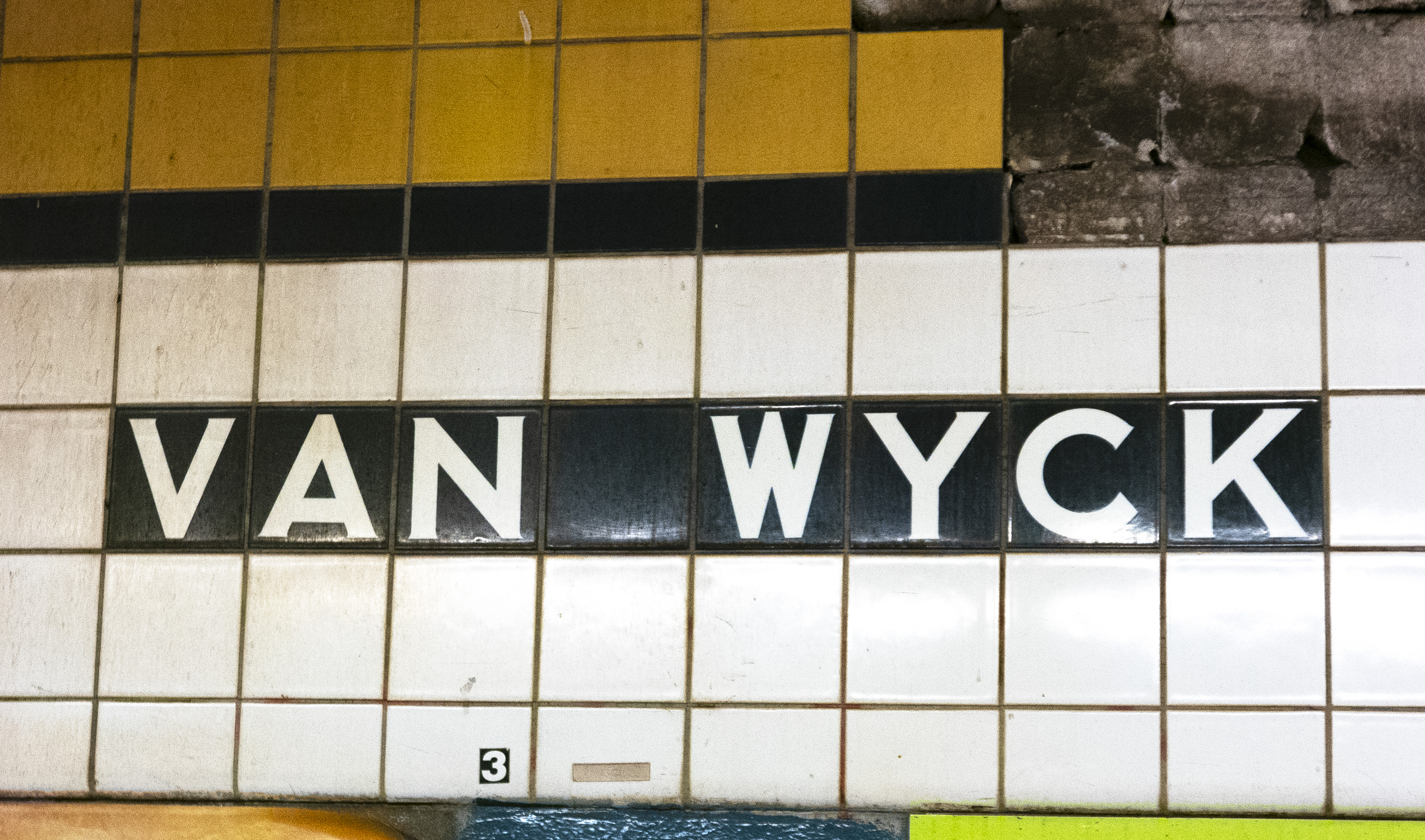
Tile caption below trim line

This local station, which is located directly under the Van Wyck Expressway's southbound service road, has four tracks and two side platforms. The F train stops here at all times, while the E train stops here during evenings, late nights, and weekends. The E uses the two center tracks to bypass this station weekdays (Manhattan-bound from approximately 6:00 a.m. to 6:30 p.m., Jamaica-bound from 7:30 a.m. to 8:00 p.m.). The next stop to the west is Kew Gardens–Union Turnpike. The next stop to the east is Sutphin Boulevard station for F and <F> trains and Jamaica–Van Wyck for E trains.

The platforms have Slate blue I-beam columns, a Jasmine yellow tile trim with black borders, and name tablets reading "VAN WYCK BLVD." in white sans-serif lettering on a black background with a Jasmine yellow border. Small panels reading "BRIARWOOD" in white Copperplate font are centered underneath each name tablet; they were placed over the original directional exit tiling (in place at other IND stations) that pointed to Queens Boulevard or 85th Avenue, the latter of which has never existed. The small tile captions running below the trim line retain the original "VAN WYCK" name. The tile band is part of a color-coded tile system used throughout the IND. The tile colors were designed to facilitate navigation for travelers going away from Lower Manhattan. As such, a different tile color is used at Parsons Boulevard, the next express station to the east. The yellow tiles used at the Briarwood station were also used at Kew Gardens–Union Turnpike, the next express station to the west, and Sutphin Boulevard, the only other local station between Union Turnpike and Parsons Boulevard.

The I-beam piers on the platforms are located every 15 feet (4.6 m) and support girders above the platforms. The roof girders are also connected to columns in the walls adjoining each platform. The full-length mezzanine is directly above the platforms; however the northern half was closed, and the station mezzanine has hosted the NYPD Transit Bureau's District 20 station house since the mid-1990s. The open southern half is separated into three sections with chain-link fences; fare control is in the middle due to the need to have a pedestrian underpass under Queens Boulevard. As a result, there are no free transfers between directions. The station contains the headquarters of the New York City Police Department (NYPD)'s Transit District 20.

The tunnel is covered by a U-shaped trough that contains utility pipes and wires. The outer walls of this trough are composed of columns, spaced approximately every 5 feet (1.5 m) with concrete infill between them. There is a 1-inch (25 mm) gap between the tunnel wall and the platform wall, which is made of 4-inch (100 mm)-thick brick covered over by a tiled finish. The columns between the tracks are also spaced every 5 feet (1.5 m), with no infill.

=== Exits ===
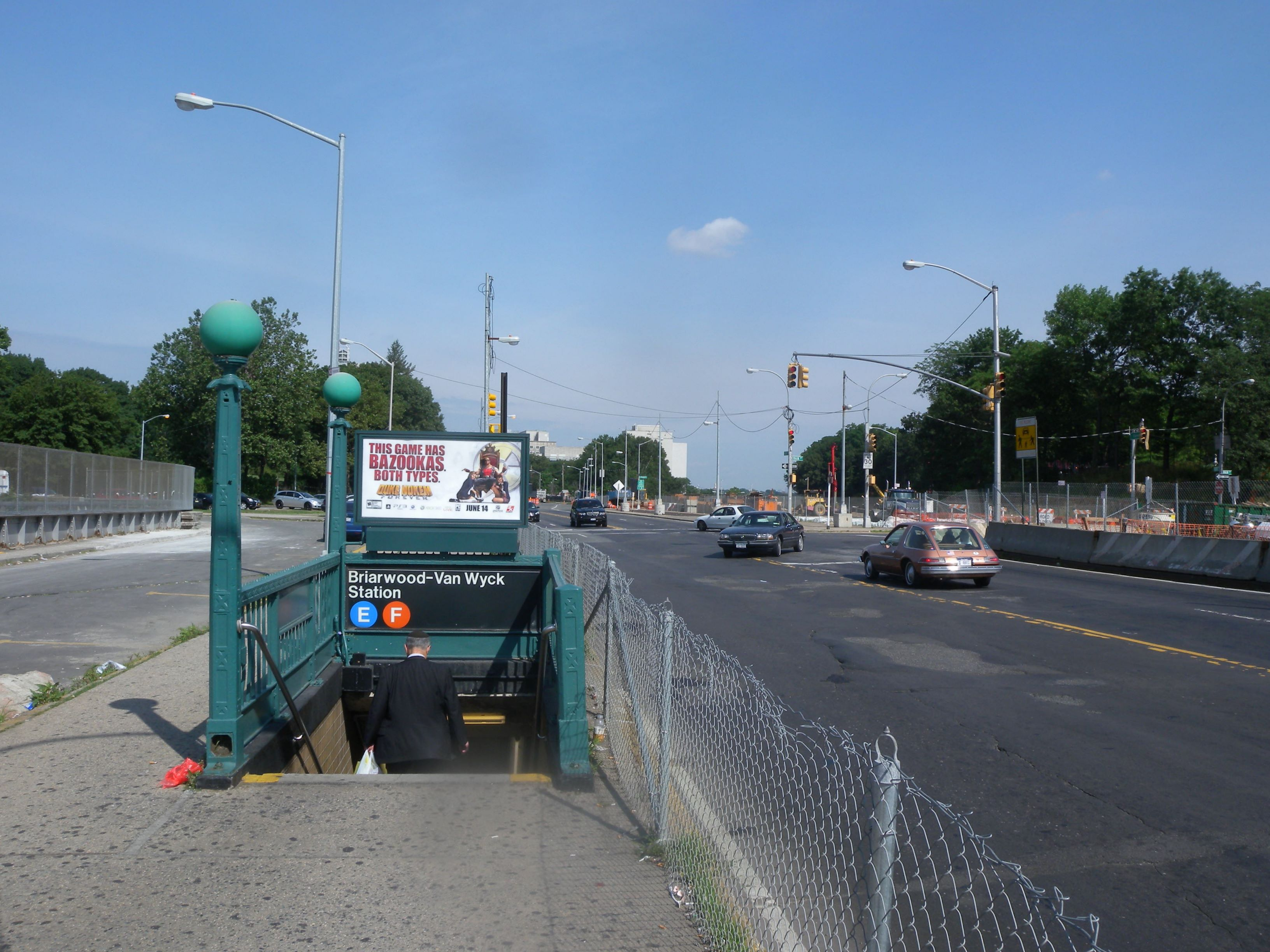
Former southern stair, demolished in 2011

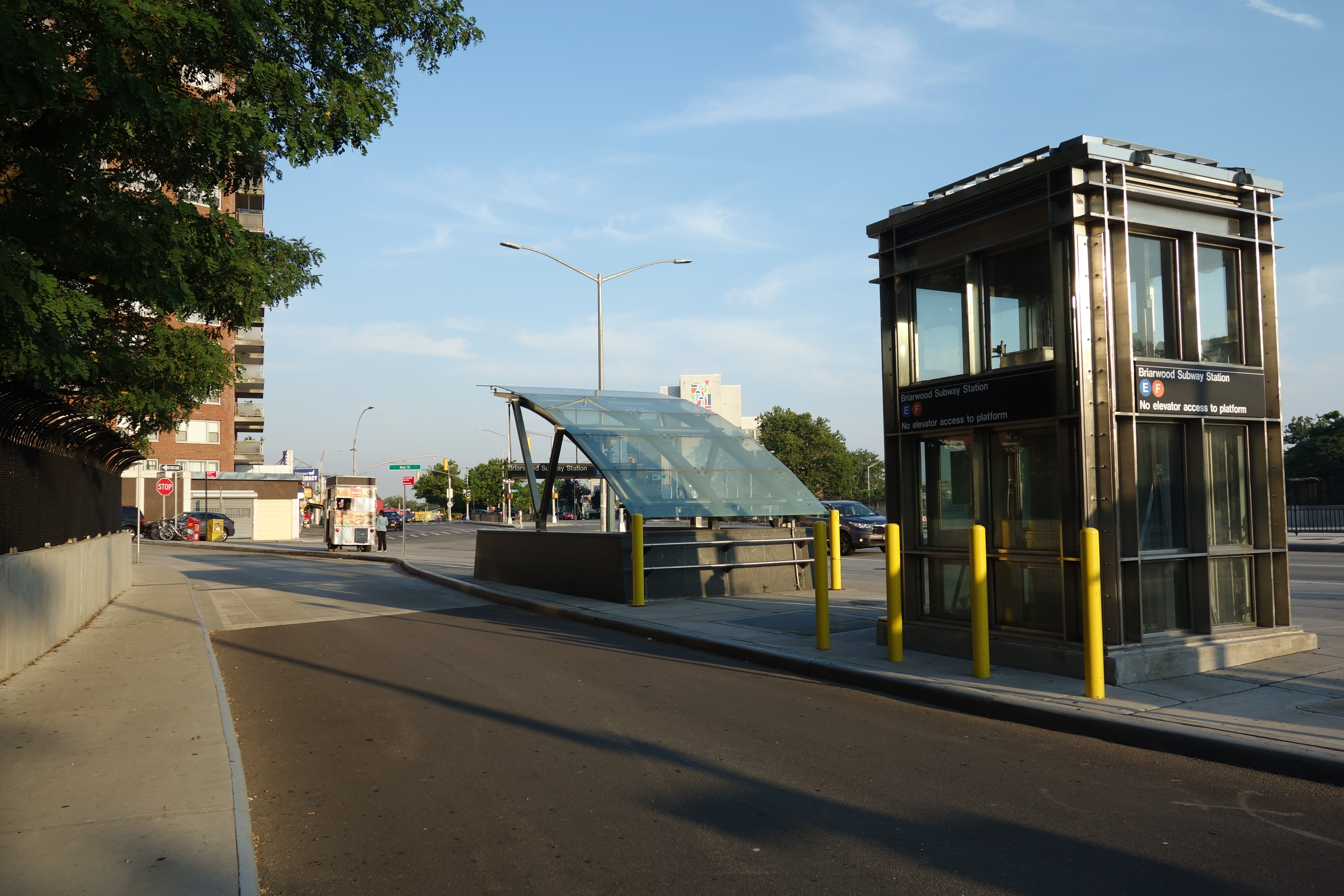
Current northern stair and elevator on the same site

The full-time exit is via a long passageway to Main Street and Queens Boulevard, where there is an escalator and elevator to the north side of Queens Boulevard. The elevator leads only to the mezzanine level. Another pair of exits exists at the southwestern corner of Queens Boulevard and the Van Wyck Expressway service road: one on the west side of the service road next to Maple Grove Cemetery, the other on the east side of the service road adjoining the Van Wyck Expressway.

=== Track layout ===
To the west of this station are track connections from both pairs of express and local tracks, which lead to Jamaica Yard.

Just to the compass south (railroad north) of this station, the IND Archer Avenue Line splits from the Queens Boulevard Line in a flying junction; trains to/from the Archer Avenue line can serve the station as local trains or bypass it as express trains. At the split, the Archer Avenue tracks split from both pairs of express and local Queens Boulevard tracks. The connection uses trackways that were constructed at the same time as the station, part of the section of the Queens Boulevard Line from Kew Gardens–Union Turnpike to 169th Street.

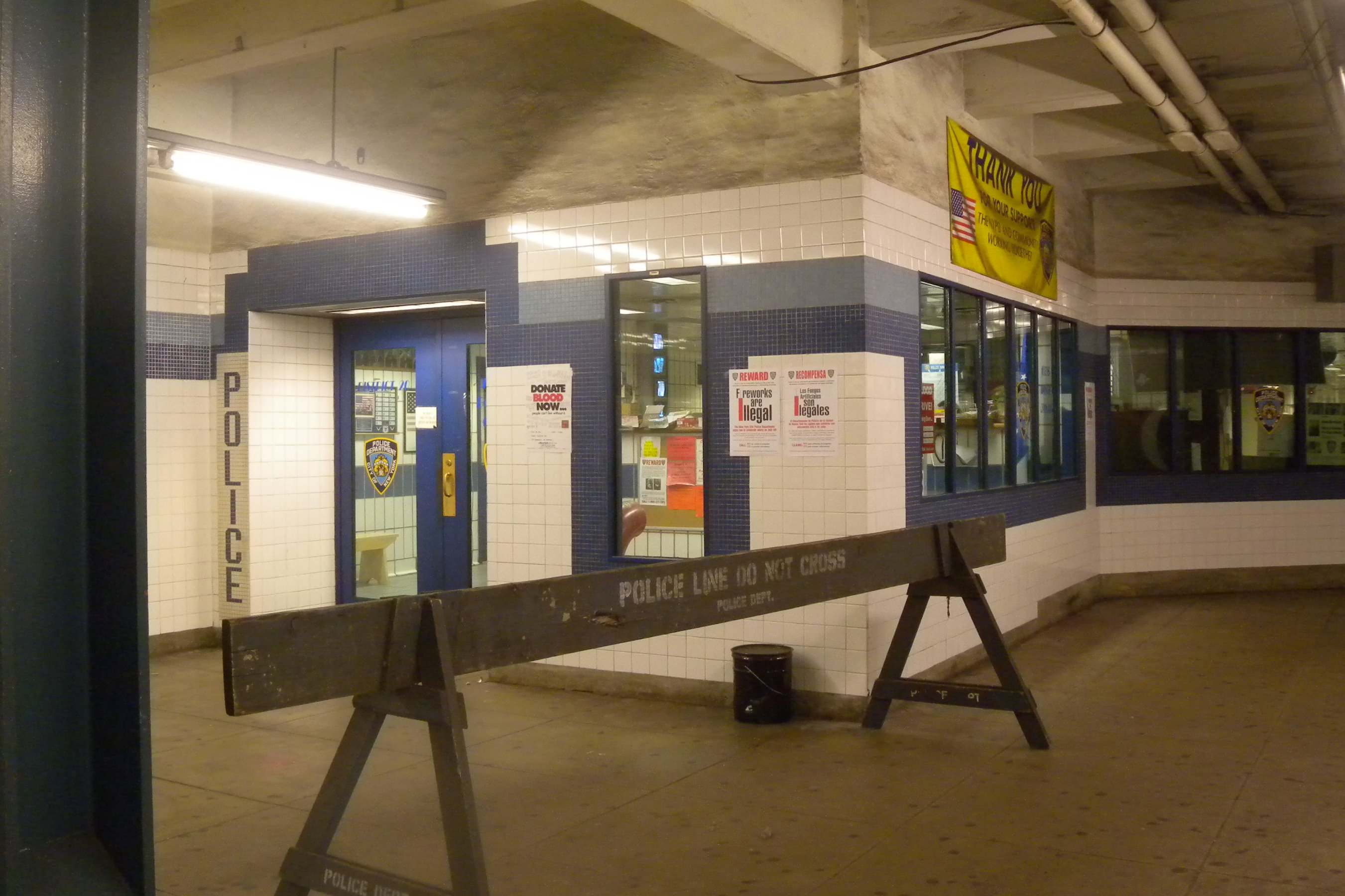
Police station

The provision (then known as the "Van Wyck Stub") was intended to be built as part of the IND Second System in the 1920s and 1930s. The original plans had a line diverging south of Briarwood, running down what is now the Van Wyck Expressway to Rockaway Boulevard near modern John F. Kennedy International Airport. The extension was never constructed due to lack of funding. The current Archer Avenue plans emerged in the 1960s under the city and Metropolitan Transportation Authority (MTA)'s Program for Action. It was conceived as an expansion of Queens Boulevard service to a "Southeast Queens" line along the right-of-way of the Long Island Rail Road Atlantic Branch towards Locust Manor; a two-track spur from the Queens Boulevard Line would use the original Van Wyck Boulevard bellmouths. However, the line was only completed to Jamaica Center–Parsons/Archer, and opened several years behind schedule in 1988. There are punch boxes on the Jamaica-bound track of this station to allow trains to go to either the Hillside Avenue or Archer Avenue lines.

== Naming ==
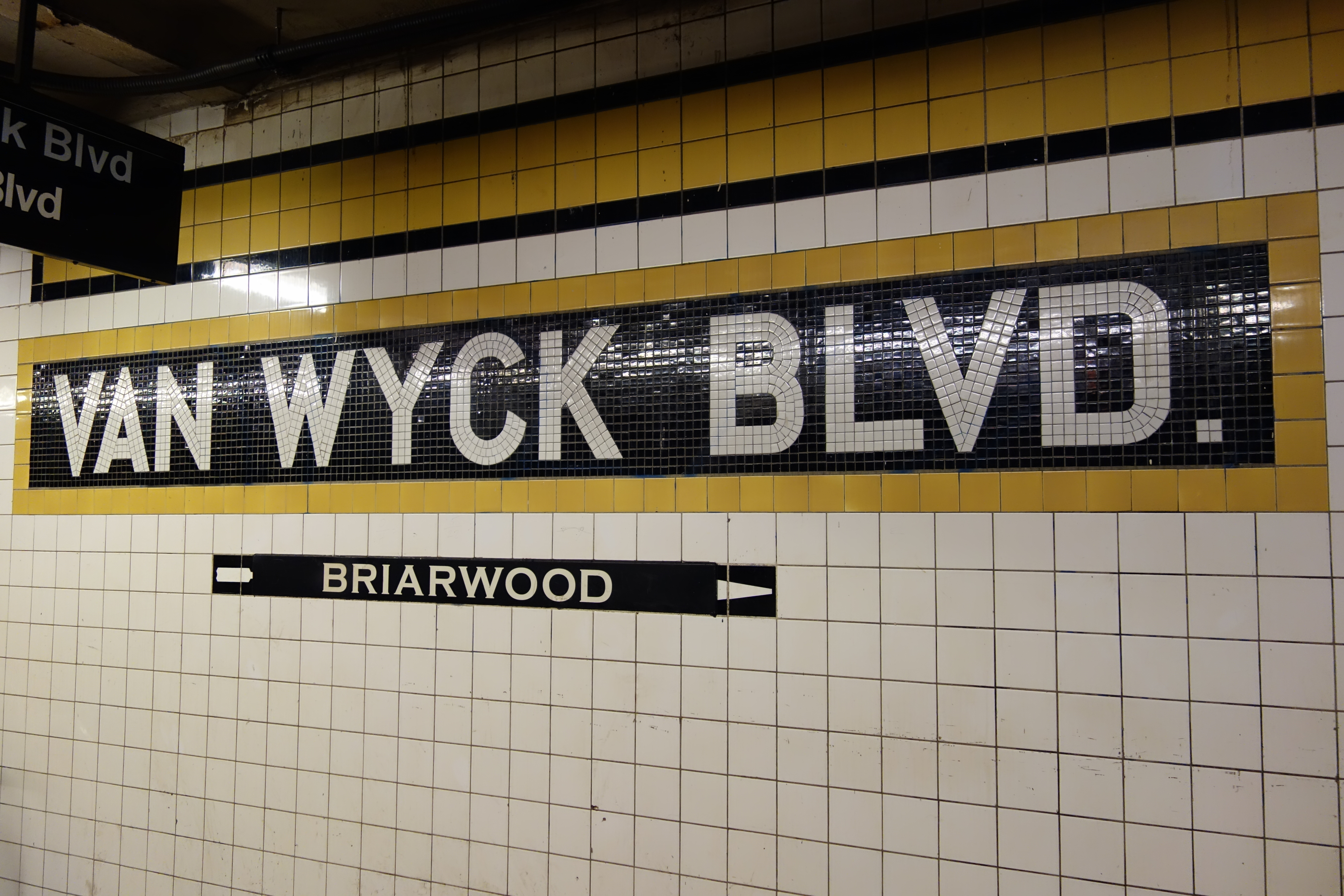
Name tablet with panel covering original directional tiles

The station was originally known as Van Wyck Boulevard, for the wide thoroughfare that existed when the station opened. The Van Wyck Expressway was built over the boulevard in 1949. As early as 1997, the Briarwood Community Association had been pushing to rename the station to "Briarwood" or "Briarwood–Van Wyck" since it better reflected the fact that the station served the Briarwood neighborhood. Furthermore, the existing name memorialized Robert Anderson Van Wyck, the first mayor of the City of Greater New York, who had been accused of corruption. Bronx borough president Fernando Ferrer supported the proposed renaming. The name was changed to Briarwood–Van Wyck Boulevard in 1998 to avoid confusion with Jamaica–Van Wyck on the IND Archer Avenue Line. The mosaic tilework remained unchanged.

By 2008, community members were advocating for the "Van Wyck" name to be dropped entirely, since "Van Wyck Boulevard" does not characterize the area well (the now-expressway runs through several other neighborhoods in Queens). State senator Tony Avella and local community groups pressed for the name change. The legislation, proposed in January 2013, was passed in the New York State Assembly on June 19, 2014. In August 2014, it was announced that the station would be renamed Briarwood. The station was formally renamed on April 17, 2015.

== In popular culture ==
In the 1988 comedy film Coming to America, Eddie Murphy's character, Akeem, tries to persuade his love interest to marry him and go to Zamunda, a fictional kingdom in Africa. He follows her onto the Briarwood station. When Akeem jumps the turnstile, "Van Wyck Boulevard" can be seen in the background above the token booth. They board the train which next stops at the Sutphin Boulevard station where she gets off. This scene, however, was actually shot at the unused platform and tracks of Hoyt–Schermerhorn Streets station in Brooklyn.
