= Parsons Boulevard station =

New York City Subway station in Queens

Parsons Blvd
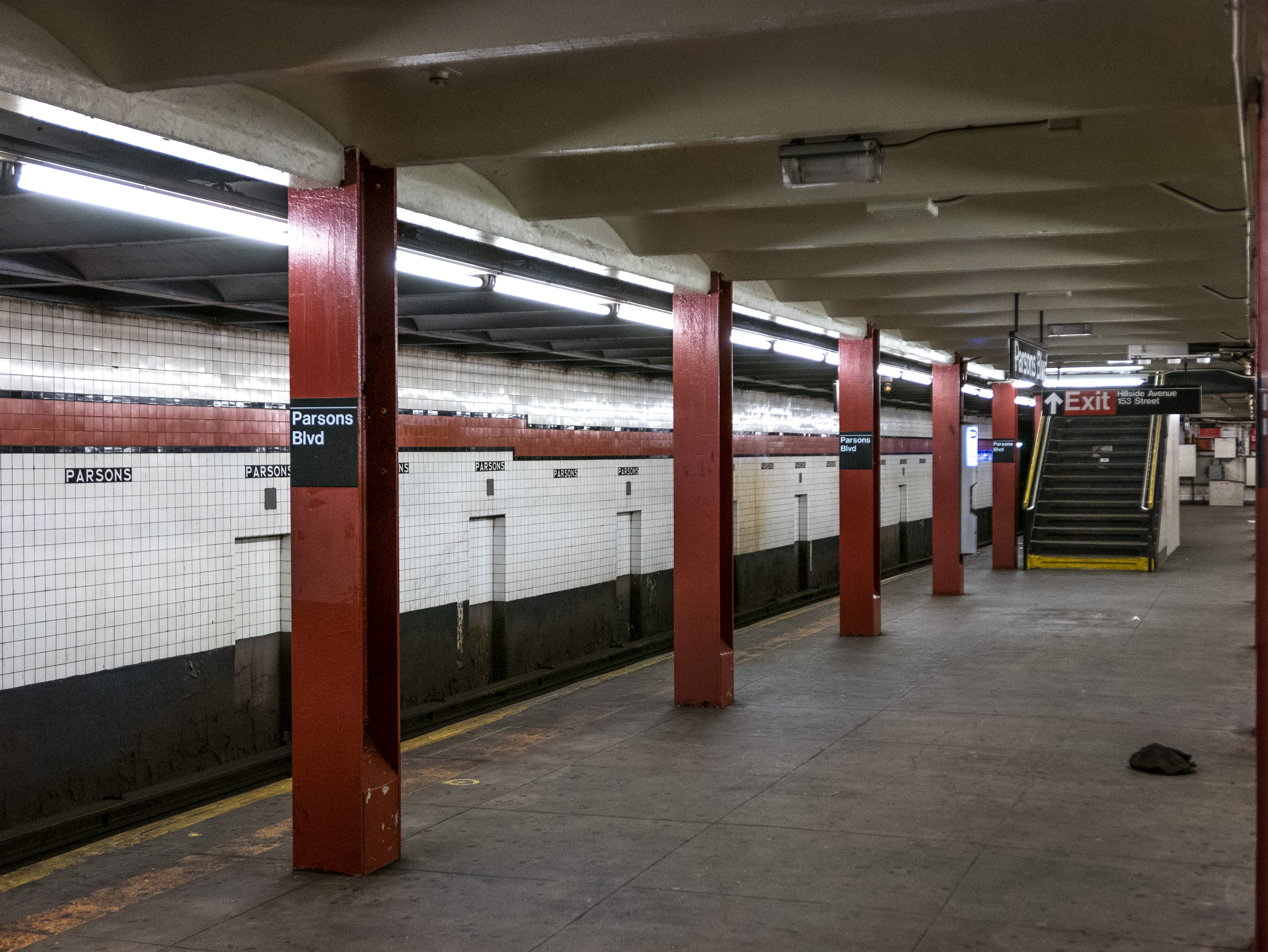
- Southbound platform

Station statistics
- Address: Parsons Boulevard & Hillside Avenue; Queens, New York
- Borough: Queens
- Locale: Briarwood, Jamaica Hills, Jamaica
- Coordinates: 40.7077°N 73.8028°W
- Division: B (IND)
- Line: IND Queens Boulevard Line
- Services: E (limited rush-hour service); F (all times) <F> (two rush hour trains, peak direction)
- Transit: NYCT Bus: Q1, Q24, Q43, Q83; MTA Bus: Q25, Q65, Q110, Q111, Q112, Q113, Q114, Q115
- Structure: Underground
- Platforms: 2 island platforms cross-platform interchange
- Tracks: 4

Other information
- Opened: April 24, 1937 (89 years ago)
- Accessible: No; under construction

Traffic
- 2025: 1,586,412 ▲0.6%
- Rank: 223 out of 423
Services
Preceding station	New York City Subway	Following station
Sutphin Boulevard F <F> toward Coney Island–Stillwell Avenue	Local	169th Street F <F> toward Jamaica–179th Street
Kew Gardens–Union Turnpike E express	no regular service	Jamaica–179th Street E express
Location
Location within New York City Subway
Location within New York City
Location within New York
Track layout
Street map
Station service legend
Symbol	Description
Stops all times	Stops all times
Stops rush hours only	Stops rush hours only
Stops rush hours in the peak direction only (limited service)	Stops rush hours in the peak direction only (limited service)

The Parsons Boulevard station is an express station on the IND Queens Boulevard Line of the New York City Subway. Located at the intersection of Parsons Boulevard and Hillside Avenue at the border between the Briarwood, Jamaica Hills neighborhoods as well as the central section of Jamaica in Queens, it is served by the F train at all times, the <F> train during rush hours in the reverse peak direction, and a few rush-hour E trains.

This station opened on April 24, 1937 as part of an extension of the Independent Subway System's Queens Boulevard Line, and served as a terminal for F trains until the line was extended to 179th Street in 1950. Ridership at this station decreased sharply after the opening of the Archer Avenue lines in 1988.

== History ==
=== Construction ===
The Queens Boulevard Line was one of the first built by the city-owned Independent Subway System (IND), and was planned to stretch between the IND Eighth Avenue Line in Manhattan and 178th Street and Hillside Avenue in Jamaica, Queens. The line was first proposed in 1925. Construction of the line was approved by the New York City Board of Estimate on October 4, 1928. On December 23, 1930, the contract for the construction of the section between 137th Street (now the Van Wyck Expressway) and 178th Street—Route 108, Section 11—was let. This section included the stations at 169th Street, Parsons Boulevard, Sutphin Boulevard, and Briarwood. As planned, Parsons Boulevard was to be an express stop, while the other three stations would be local stops. The contract for this section was awarded to Triest Contracting Corporation. The line was constructed using the cut-and-cover tunneling method, and to allow pedestrians to cross, temporary bridges were built over the trenches.

The first section of the line opened on August 19, 1933 from the connection to the Eighth Avenue Line at 50th Street to Roosevelt Avenue in Jackson Heights. Later that year, a $23 million loan was approved to finance the remainder of the line, along with other IND lines. The remainder of the line was built by the Public Works Administration. In summer 1933 work on this station and 169th Street were completed, far ahead of schedule. In 1934 and 1935, construction of the extension to Jamaica was suspended for 15 months and was halted by strikes. Construction was further delayed due to a strike in 1935, instigated by electricians opposing wages paid by the General Railway Signal Company.

In April 1936, William Jerome Daly, the secretary of the New York City Board of Transportation, stated, in response to requests for a stop at 178th Street, that constructing a station at that location would prevent express service from operating past 71st Avenue. He said that with a final station at 169th Street, express trains could run to Parsons Boulevard, and that if the line was extended to Springfield Boulevard as planned, express service could be extended past 178th Street with a yard east of the new terminal.

In August 1936, construction to Forest Hills was expected to be completed by the end of the year. While the tracks were installed all the way to 178th Street, the stops to the east of Union Turnpike still needed to be tiled, have stairways, turnstiles and lighting installed. Two additional contracts remained to be put up for bid, both the results of last minute changes. One of the changes concerned the line's eastern terminal. Initially, express trains were planned to terminate at a station at 178th Street. However, the plans were changed to terminate the express trains at Parsons Boulevard, requiring the installation of switches. Since construction of the tunnel was already completed in this section, a few hundred feet of the wall separating the eastbound and westbound train tracks had to be removed to fit the two switches. In addition, a new tunnel roof and new side supports had to be constructed. Since the line's new terminal would be at 169th Street, the tracks at 178th Street would be used to turn back trains. This change delayed the opening of the line from Union Turnpike to 169th Street, and also led to protests from the Jamaica Estates Association because the 178th Street station had been eliminated.

A 3.5-mile (5.6 km) extension from Roosevelt Avenue to Kew Gardens opened on December 31, 1936. In March 1937, the extension to 169th Street was expected to be opened on May 1, requiring work to be finished by April 3, and fully approved and tested by April 20. As of this point, minor station work remained, including the installation of light bulbs, with the only major work left to be completed being the final 200 feet (61 m) of track in the 169th Street terminal.

=== Opening ===
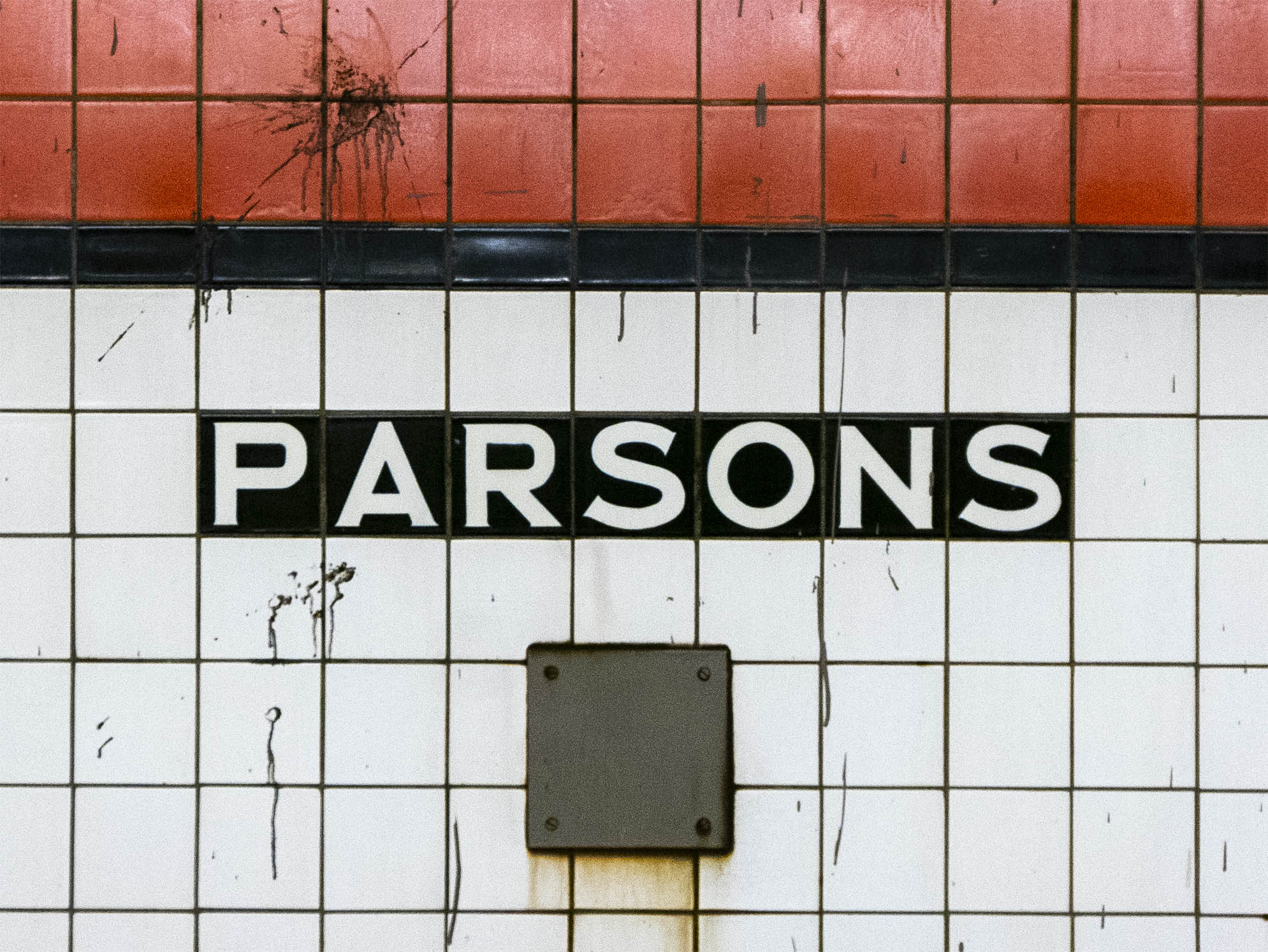
Tile caption below trim line

On April 9, 1937, Mayor Fiorello La Guardia announced that the operation of the $14.4 million extension to Jamaica and express service would begin on April 24. The extension to Hillside Avenue and 178th Street, with a terminal station at 169th Street, opened as planned on April 24, 1937. Service was initially provided by E trains, which began making express stops from 71st–Continental Avenues to Queens Plaza during rush hours on the same date, and by EE local trains during non-rush hours. The express service operated between approximately 6:30 and 10:30 a.m. and from 3:00 p.m. to 7:00 p.m., and ran every three to five minutes. This extension was celebrated with a ribbon-cutting ceremony at the Parsons Boulevard station and with a parade along Hillside Avenue.

On December 15, 1940, F trains began running via the newly opened IND Sixth Avenue Line, also running express west of 71st Avenue. 169th Street and Parsons Boulevard were both used as terminal stations during this time, with the E terminating at 169th Street and the F at this station. This setup was instituted to prevent congestion at both stations.

While 169th Street was the end of the line, F trains terminated at Parsons Boulevard because the 169th Street station provided an unsatisfactory terminal setup for a four-track line. There were no storage facilities provided at the 169th Street station, and since 169th Street was a local station, trains on the outer local tracks had to cross over to the inner express tracks to reverse direction. Therefore, the line was planned to be extended to 184th Place with a station at 179th Street containing two island platforms, sufficient entrances and exits, and storage for four ten-car trains. The facilities would allow for the operation of express and local service to the station. Delayed due to the Great Depression and World War II, the extension was completed later than expected and opened on December 11, 1950. E trains were extended there at all times and F trains were extended evenings, nights, and Sunday mornings. On May 13, 1951, all F trains outside of rush hour were extended to 179th Street using the local tracks beyond Parsons Boulevard. On October 8, 1951, trains were extended to 179th Street at all times. During rush hours F trains skipped 169th Street running via the express tracks. At other times, the F stopped at 169th Street.

In 1953, the platforms at several IND stations were lengthened to allow eleven-car trains; originally, service was provided with ten-car trains. (Note: The platforms at 75th Avenue and Sutphin Boulevard on the Queens Boulevard Line were lengthened to allow 11-car operation on the E and F routes. The subway cars on the IND were built to be 60 feet (18.3 m) long. These cars typically operated in 10-car trains, with an entire train length being 600 feet (182.9 m). When platforms at stations were lengthened to accommodate 11-car trains, the platforms had to be extended an additional car length, or 60 feet (18.3 m), making the platform at least 660 feet (201.2 m) long.) The lengthened trains began running during rush hour on September 8, 1953. Eleven-car trains would only operate on weekdays. The extra car increased the total carrying capacity by 4,000 passengers. The operation of eleven-car trains ended in 1958 because of operational difficulties. The signal blocks, especially in Manhattan, were too short to accommodate the longer trains, and the motormen had a very small margin of error to properly platform the train. It was found that operating ten-car trains allowed for two additional trains per hour to be scheduled.

=== Changes ===
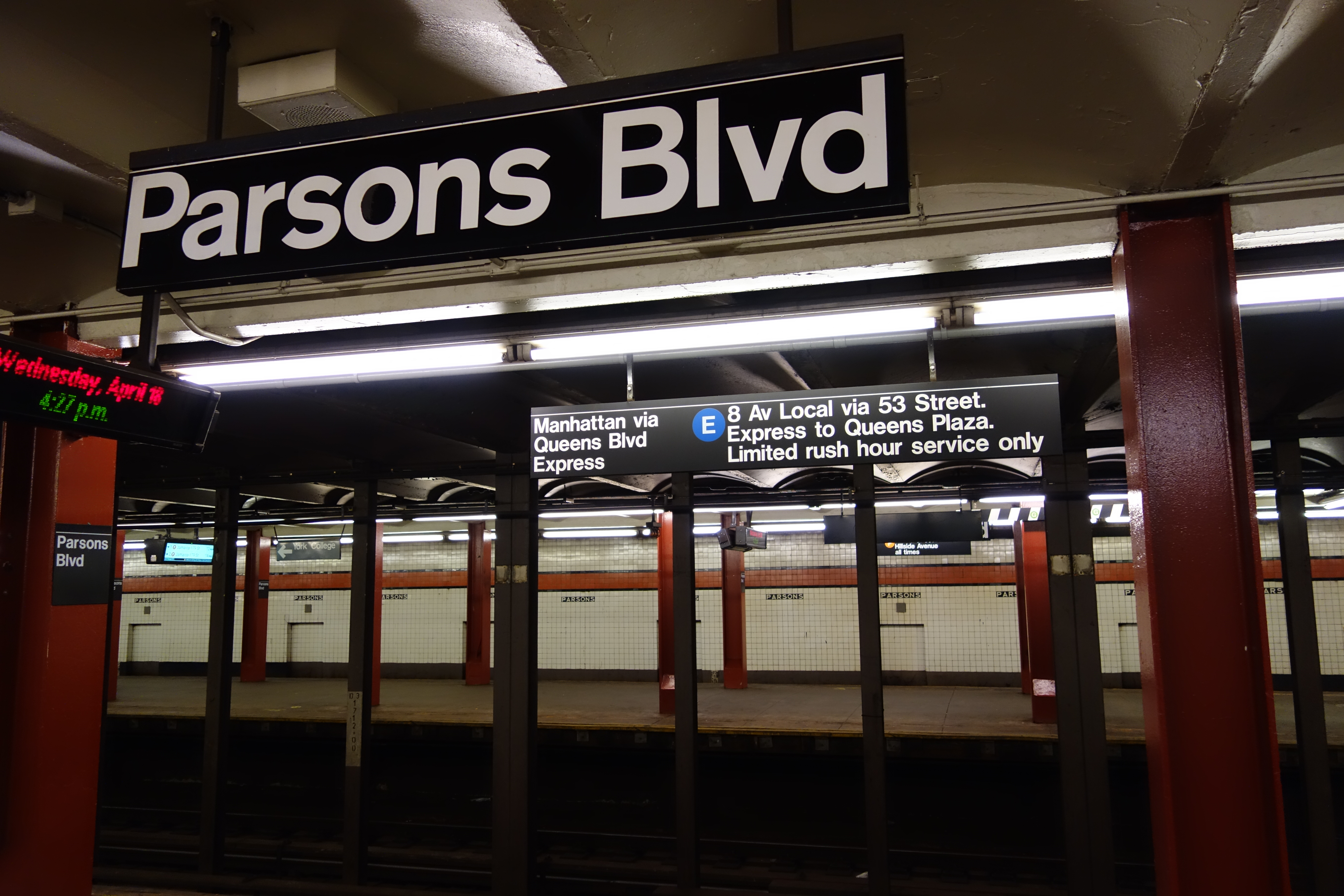
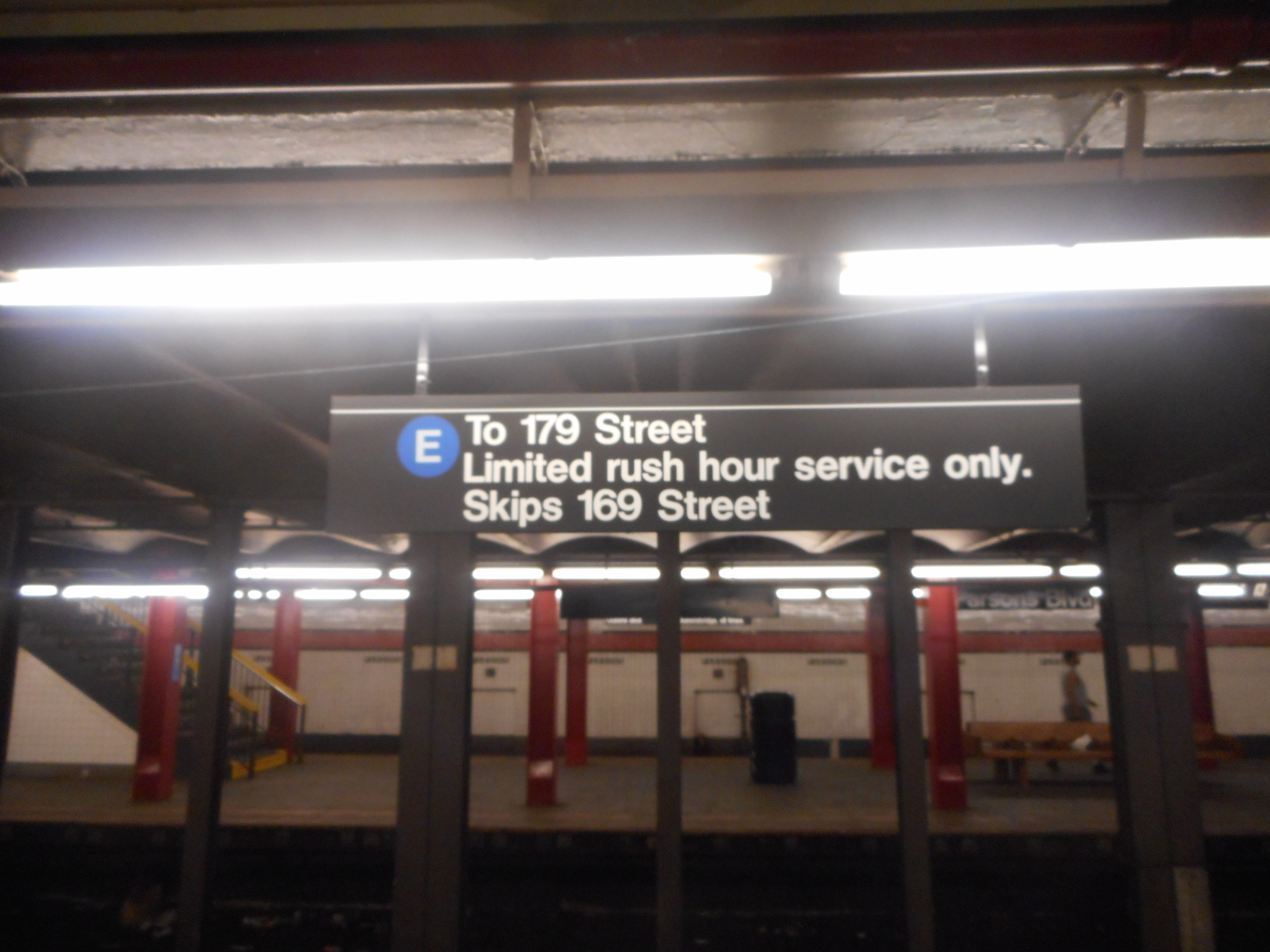
Signs showing that some E trains stop on the express tracks during rush hours

In 1976, Hillcrest High School students painted 12 murals in the station. In the 1980s, this station was part of the Metropolitan Transportation Authority (MTA)'s Neighborhood Adopt-A-Station Program. According to a sign on the wall, the Parsons Boulevard station was adopted by students of Hillcrest High School. Additionally, in 1983, improvements to the Parsons Boulevard station were scheduled as part of an MTA improvement program.

Ridership at this station decreased following the opening of the parallel Archer Avenue lines on December 11, 1988, which was expected to severely lessen congestion at the Sutphin Boulevard, Parsons Boulevard, and 169th Street stations. Ridership checks conducted before and after the opening of the new line showed that ridership at this station, between 5 and 10 a.m. on weekdays, decreased from 10,457 riders to 5,183 riders, a 50% decrease.

In conjunction with the opening of the Archer Avenue lines, service patterns were changed. E trains were rerouted via the new line, running to Jamaica Center, via the Queens Boulevard Line's express tracks, and began running express east of 71st Avenue. However, some E trains continued to run from 179th Street as expresses during the morning rush hour, stopping at Parsons Boulevard. Service at local stations, such as Sutphin Boulevard, was replaced by the R, which was extended to 179th Street from 71st Avenue. The R extension allowed F trains to continue running express to 179th Street. The changes in subway service angered riders at local stations east of 71st Avenue because they lost direct Queens Boulevard Express service. Local elected officials pressured the MTA to eliminate all-local service at these stations. On September 30, 1990, the R was cut back to 71st Avenue outside of rush hours. Local service to 179th Street was replaced by F trains, which provided Queens Boulevard Express service, during middays, evenings, and weekends, and local G service during late nights. In 1992, the MTA decided to have F trains run local east of 71st Avenue on a six-month trial basis to replace R service, which would be cut back to 71st Avenue at all times. The test started on October 26, 1992 and was implemented on a permanent basis six months later, eliminating express service along Hillside Avenue.

In 2003, MTA proposed closing 177 part-time token booths, later reduced to 62, across the subway system and replace them with MetroCard Vending Machines and High-Entry/Exit Turnstiles to help cut the MTA's $1 billion deficit. The closure of booths began in August 2003. The station's part-time token booth, which was staffed for 7 1/2 hours on weekdays, at 153rd Street was closed on August 17, 2003, and automatic entrance to the 153rd Street exits was provided at all times. Access hours at these entrances were previously 6:15 a.m. to 10:40 p.m.

Under the 2015–2019 MTA Capital Program, the station, along with thirty other New York City Subway stations, were scheduled to undergo a complete overhaul and would have been entirely closed for up to 6 months. Updates would have included cellular service, Wi-Fi, charging stations, improved signage, and improved station lighting. However, these renovations are being deferred until the 2020–2024 Capital Program due to a lack of funding. In December 2019, the MTA announced that this station would become ADA-accessible as part of the agency's 2020–2024 Capital Program. The accessibility project was to be funded by congestion pricing in New York City, but it was postponed in June 2024 after the implementation of congestion pricing was delayed. In December 2024, after congestion pricing was approved, the MTA announced that the elevator installations would proceed. Forte Construction Corp. received a $169 million contract to install elevators at Parsons Boulevard and two other stations in December 2025.

== Station layout ==
This underground station has four tracks and two island platforms. F trains stop on the outer local tracks at all times, while limited rush hour E trains stop on the center express tracks (four southbound and three northbound during the AM rush, and three southbound and four northbound during the PM rush). For local trains, the station is between Sutphin Boulevard to the west and 169th Street to the east. For express trains, the station is between Kew Gardens–Union Turnpike to the west and Jamaica–179th Street to the east.

The platform and mezzanine columns are I-beams painted maroon-red and the wall tiles along the tracks have a vermilion trim-line with a black border and name tiles underneath them consisting of "PARSONS" in white lettering on a black background. The tile band is part of a color-coded tile system used throughout the IND. The tile colors were designed to facilitate navigation for travelers going away from Lower Manhattan. As such, a different tile color was originally used at Jamaica–179th Street, the next express station to the east. The red tiles used at the Parsons Boulevard station were also used at 169th Street, the only local station between Parsons Boulevard and 179th Street. Some of the black columns separating the express tracks have white signs reading "Parsons" in black lettering. There is a usually unstaffed signal tower on the southern end of the Manhattan-bound platform.

Above the platforms is a full-length mezzanine that connects the two station entrances at either end. It allows free crossovers between directions, and has more staircases to the Jamaica-bound platform than the Manhattan-bound one because a crew office was built on the Manhattan-bound side. A free passageway, which allows people to walk through the mezzanine without having to pay a fare, connects the entrances at 153rd Street and Parsons Boulevard. At the Parsons Boulevard end of the station, there is a fenced off storage area. A pump station for draining water after floods is located at the geographical west end of the station at 153rd Street.

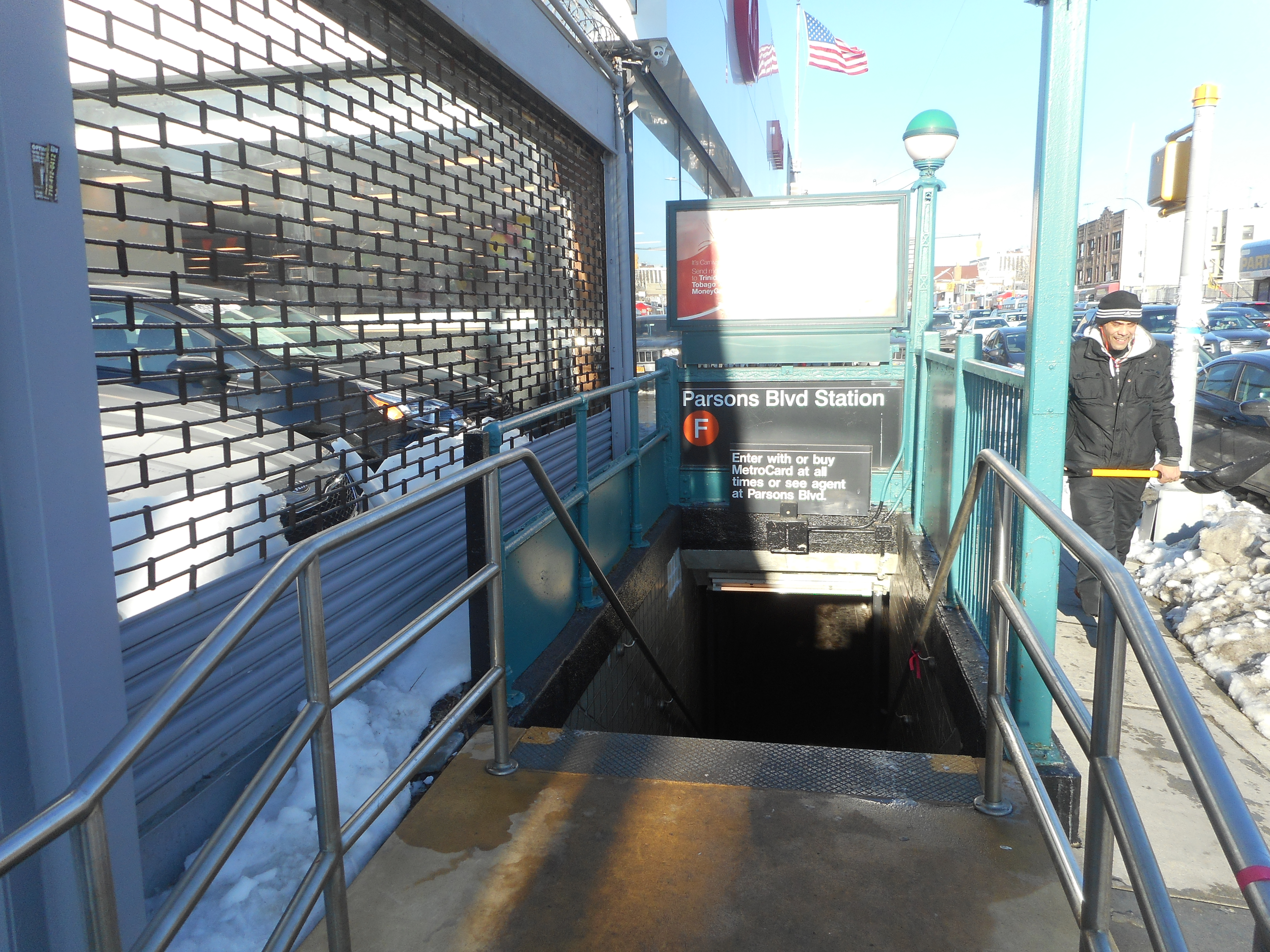
View of the station entrance at the northeast corner of Hillside Avenue and 153rd Street.

=== Exits ===
The main entrance is at the north end of the station. It has a turnstile bank and a full-time token booth, which had seven regular turnstiles as of 2007. Two street stairs lead to either southern corner of Parsons Boulevard and Hillside Avenue, and a single staircase to the northwest corner. This entrance formerly was the station's full-time entrance.

The entrance at the south end is unstaffed; in 2007, it had three HEET turnstiles. This fare array leads to three street stairs to the intersection of 153rd Street and Hillside Avenue–one each at the northern, southwest, and southeast corners of the intersection. The part-time token booth at 153rd Street was removed in 2003.
