= Leslie Kaliades =

American photographer

Leslie Kaliades (1961–1999) was an artist known for her photography about her experience with AIDS. Kaliades was diagnosed in 1992. An artist's file is archived at the Museum of Modern Art's library. Early exhibited works include "A Drop in Confusion: Living with Illness" at Pulse Art, a membership gallery active during the late 1990s in NYC. (January 1997). A 1997 film "Trilogy: What is Illness?, Altered After, The Journey" can be seen on the Internet Archive. In 2019, her work was included in Altered After at Participant Inc. The show presented artworks that incorporated archives, archaeology, and salvaged objects in response to HIV/AIDS.
