= The John Kerwin Show =

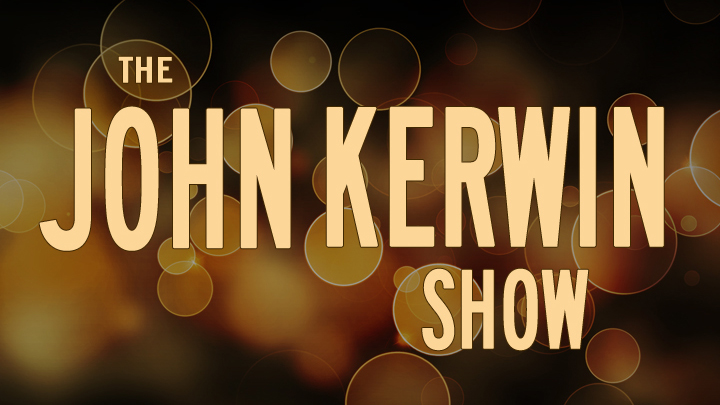
- Created by: John Kerwin
- Directed by: Rudy Milanovich
- Starring: John Kerwin
- Country of origin: United States
- Original language: English
- No. of seasons: 13
- No. of episodes: 114

Production
- Producer: John Kerwin
- Production locations: Encino, California
- Cinematography: Lucie Aleks
- Camera setup: Rudy Milanovich

Original release
- Network: Jewish Life Television
- Release: 2001 – April 8, 2017

The John Kerwin Show was an American monthly talk show filmed in Los Angeles, California. The show was broadcast on Jewish Life Television (JLTV) and featured on YouTube.

== History ==
The John Kerwin Show was originally formatted as a late-night talk show.

Beginning in 2001, the show has featured guests including Cloris Leachman, Bruce Dern and Robert Forster. The program was produced for 7 seasons, 2010–2016, with sporadic production in prior years.

In August, 2007, Kerwin, along with then producer Rob Baker met with NBC's head of late night and prime time programming Rick Ludwin and was a contender for the position then to be vacated by Conan O'Brien in 2009 as he left NBC's "Late Night" to host The Tonight Show. The position was eventually given to Jimmy Fallon. He also was considered to host a talk show on TV Land but lost hosting duties to ALF.

In July, 2010, The John Kerwin Show began regular production and started airing on JLTV nationwide.

Starting in 2015, John became a featured columnist for Tae Kwon Do Times, Stand-Up Comedy Magazine and Puretimes Entertainment magazine.

The show's final season in 2017 was reformatted as The John Kerwin Kids Show, featuring only child actors. Both the original and the Kids Show continued to air in reruns on JLTV until the network removed it from the schedule in 2019.

== Notable episodes ==
For the show's 50th episode in January 2006, Kerwin's guest was actor David Carradine, whose appearance turned out to be the actor's last late night talk show appearance before his death. The appearance by Carradine and Kerwin's achievement earning a Black Belt in Taekwondo prompted Tae Kwon Do Times to feature Kerwin on the cover of its September 2015 issue.

In December 2006 host John Kerwin and the show received a special Commendation from Los Angeles Mayor Antonio Villaraigosa on the occasion of the show's 6th anniversary on the air and 60th episode.

For the May 2008 episode featuring guests Ed Asner, Kevin Sorbo and Keaton Simons, a special monologue was prepared featuring comedy contributed by writers from each former Tonight Show host, Bill Dana (Steve Allen), Dick Cavett (Jack Paar), Tony DeSena (Johnny Carson) and Marvin Silbermintz (Jay Leno).

The March 2012 episode, Jonathan Winters was featured as a guest; this was the show's 100th episode and was covered by LA Weekly and the Santa Monica Daily Press.

On Episode 110, Kerwin interviewed The Harlem Globetrotters at the Honda Center and played basketball against them as part of a remote shoot for the show.

The last guest on the final episode of The John Kerwin Show was actor Jonathan Winters.

== Awards ==
The John Kerwin Show has won over 15 TV awards including the Telly Award, the Wave Award, the AEGIS Award, and the Hermes Award.
