= Kew Gardens–Union Turnpike station =

New York City Subway station in Queens

Kew Gardens–Union Turnpike
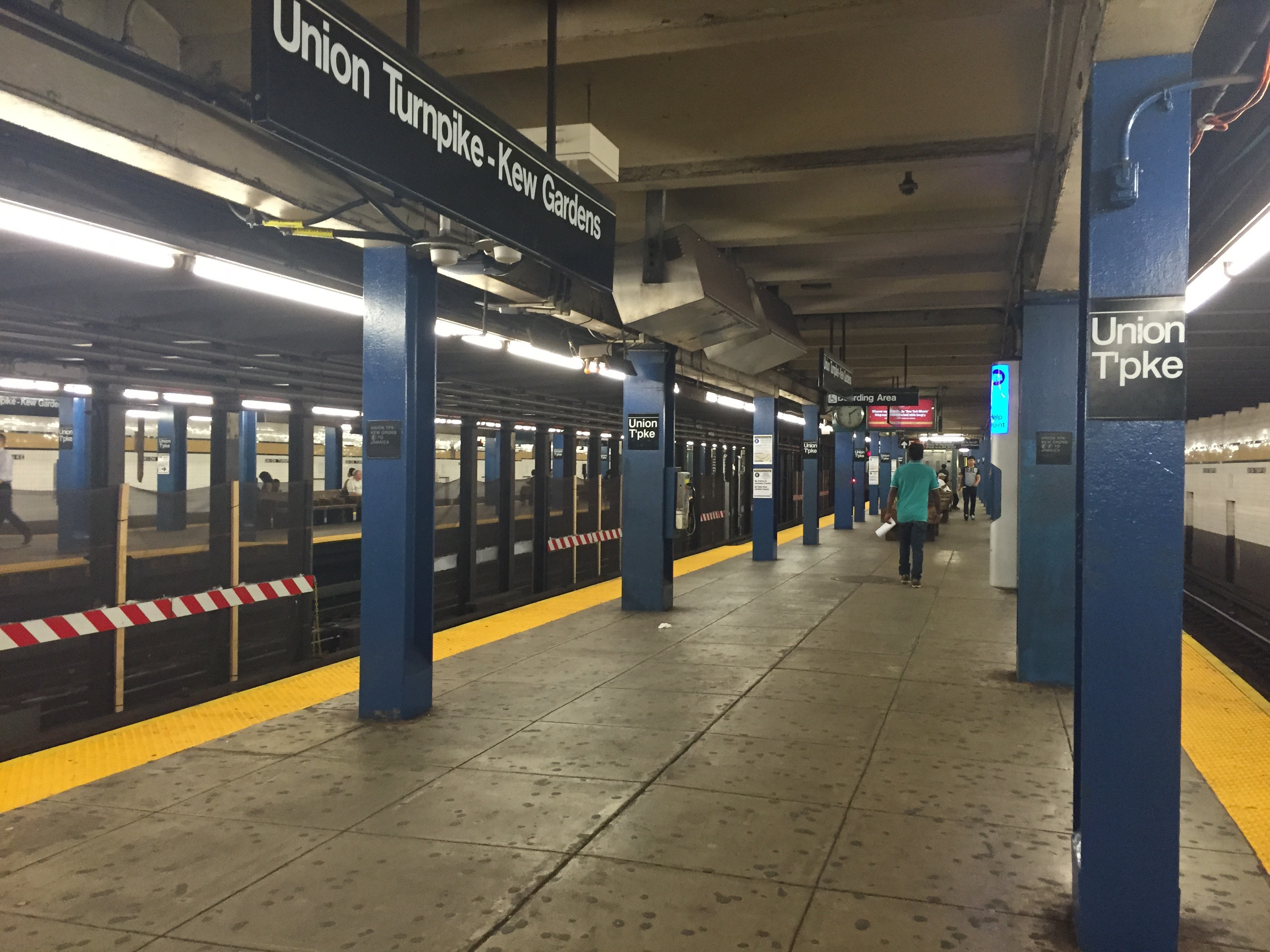
- The Jamaica bound platform at Kew Gardens–Union Turnpike, with the two parts of the station name printed in reverse order on the overhead sign.

Station statistics
- Address: Union Turnpike & Queens Boulevard; Kew Gardens, New York
- Borough: Queens
- Locale: Kew Gardens
- Coordinates: 40.714151°N 73.830786°W
- Division: B (IND)
- Line: IND Queens Boulevard Line
- Services: E (all times); F (all times) <F> (two rush hour trains, peak direction)
- Transit: NYCT Bus: Q45, Q46, Q48, QM63, QM64, QM68; MTA Bus: Q10, Q37/B, Q60, Q80, QM18, QM21, QM65; LIRR Kew Gardens station
- Structure: Underground
- Platforms: 2 island platforms cross-platform interchange
- Tracks: 4

Other information
- Opened: December 31, 1936; 89 years ago
- Accessible: Yes
- Former/other names: Union Turnpike–Kew Gardens

Traffic
- 2025: 5,148,711 ▲3.3%
- Rank: 57 out of 423
Services
Preceding station	New York City Subway	Following station
Forest Hills–71st Avenue E toward World Trade Center	Express	Parsons Boulevard E express
Forest Hills–71st Avenue E toward World Trade Center	Express	Jamaica–Van Wyck E toward Jamaica Center–York College
75th Avenue E F <F> toward Coney Island–Stillwell Avenue	Local	Briarwood E F <F> toward Jamaica–179th Street
Location
Location within New York City Subway
Location within New York City
Location within New York
Track layout
Upper level
Lower level
Street map
Station service legend
Symbol	Description
Stops all times	Stops all times
Stops rush hours only	Stops rush hours only
Stops weekdays during the day	Stops weekdays during the day
Stops late nights and weekends	Stops late nights and weekends
Stops rush hours in the peak direction only (limited service)	Stops rush hours in the peak direction only (limited service)

The Kew Gardens–Union Turnpike station (signed as Union Turnpike–Kew Gardens station on overhead and entrance signs) is an express station on the IND Queens Boulevard Line of the New York City Subway. Located at Union Turnpike and Queens Boulevard in Kew Gardens, Queens, it is served by the E and F trains at all times, and the <F> train during rush hours in the reverse peak direction.

The station opened on December 31, 1936 as the new terminal for the Independent Subway System's Queens Boulevard Line. The opening of the station brought significant growth to the adjacent communities of Forest Hills and Kew Gardens, transforming them from quiet residential communities to active population centers. The station became compliant with the Americans with Disabilities Act of 1990 in 2008 with the installation of three elevators and a ramp. Today, the station serves as a major transfer point between the subway and local buses. Bus service to eastern Queens is provided by the Q45, Q46, and Q48, and bus service to southern-central Queens is provided by the Q10, Q80, and Q37.

== History ==
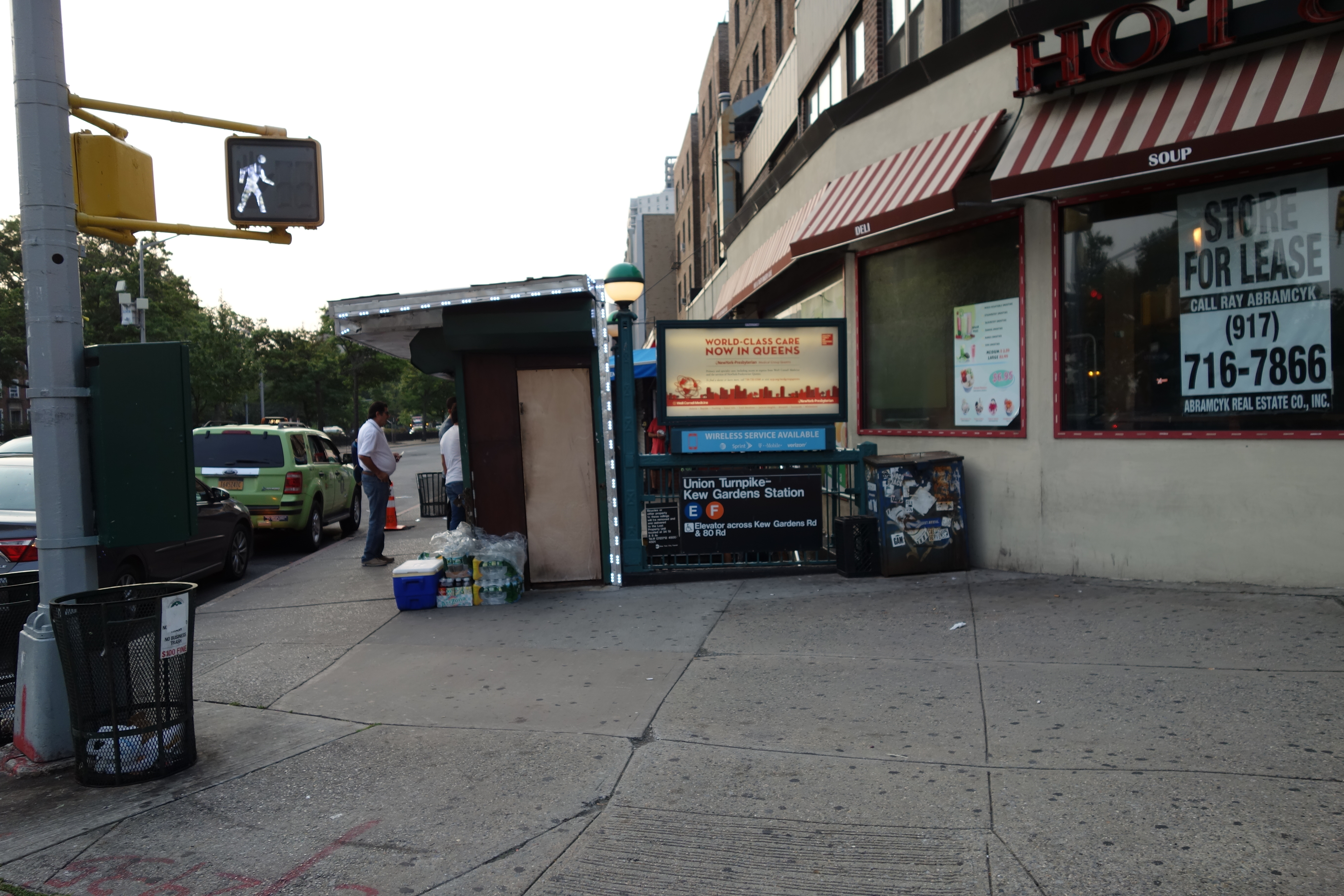
Entrance to the southeastern corner of 80th Road and Queens Boulevard

=== Construction and opening ===
The Queens Boulevard Line was one of the first built by the city-owned Independent Subway System (IND), and was planned to stretch between the IND Eighth Avenue Line in Manhattan and 178th Street and Hillside Avenue in Jamaica, Queens. The line was first proposed in 1925. Construction of the line was approved by the New York City Board of Estimate on October 4, 1928. As planned, Union Turnpike was to be one of the Queens Boulevard Line's five express stops, as well as one of 22 total stops on the line between Seventh Avenue in Manhattan and 178th Street in Queens. The line was constructed using the cut-and-cover tunneling method, and to allow pedestrians to cross, temporary bridges were built over the trenches.

One of the proposed stations would have been located at Union Turnpike. A map from June 1925 shows a proposed alternate routing for the Queens Boulevard Line, that would have had the line turn via Kew Gardens Road after the Union Turnpike station instead of continuing via Queens Boulevard. After proceeding via Kew Gardens Road, the line would have turned via Hillside Avenue. If this route were used, then Kew Gardens Road would have had to be widened to accommodate the four track line. This alternate routing would have provided for better access to Richmond Hill. In 1930, in anticipation of growth due to the building of the Queens Boulevard Line, several blocks of land along Queens Boulevard were rezoned so that fifteen-story apartment buildings could be built.

On December 18, 1931, Robert Moses, president of the Long Island State Park Commission, announced that the New York City Board of Transportation halted work on the construction of the station to revise the plan for the underpass under Queens Boulevard to eliminate a bottleneck. Originally, the underpass would have been 44 feet (13 m) wide; by 1932, the underpass was planned to be 80 feet (24 m) wide. On May 7, 1933, it was announced that work on the underpass under Queens Boulevard, which was being done by the Slattery Daino Corporation, would be completed early, and that work would begin the following week on the construction of a temporary roadway over the underpass.

The first section of the line opened on August 19, 1933 from the connection to the Eighth Avenue Line at 50th Street to Roosevelt Avenue in Jackson Heights. Later that year, a $23 million loan was approved to finance the remainder of the line, along with other IND lines. The remainder of the line was built by the Public Works Administration. In 1934 and 1935, construction of the extension to Jamaica was suspended for 15 months and was halted by strikes. Construction was further delayed due to a strike in 1935, instigated by electricians opposing wages paid by the General Railway Signal Company.

In August 1936, tracks were installed all the way to 178th Street, and the stations to Union Turnpike were completed. On December 31, 1936, the IND Queens Boulevard Line was extended by eight stops, and 3.5 miles (5.6 km), from its previous terminus at Roosevelt Avenue to Union Turnpike. The construction of the extension to Kew Gardens brought significant growth to Queens, specifically in Forest Hills and Kew Gardens. New apartment buildings were being built as a result of the subway line, and it transformed both Forest Hills and Kew Gardens from quiet residential communities of one-family houses to active population centers. Following the line's completion, there was an increase in the property values of buildings around Queens Boulevard. On April 24, 1937, the IND Queens Boulevard Line was extended four stops to 169th Street, with 169th Street and Parsons Boulevard serving as terminals.

On December 15, 1940, F trains began running via the newly opened IND Sixth Avenue Line and along the Queens Boulevard Line's express tracks; they stopped at the Union Turnpike station. On November 23, 1941, the Q37 bus operated by Green Bus Lines was extended to the station to provide a transfer to the subway. In the 1950s, an unfinished stairway leading to the busy Q44A bus stop on the north side of Queens Boulevard at 78th Avenue was completed. Having only one staircase had resulted in dangerous conditions.

=== Renovations ===
As part of the Metropolitan Transportation Authority (MTA)'s 1975–1981 transit program, lighting at the station was improved. In 1981, the MTA listed the station among the 69 most deteriorated stations in the subway system. In September 1985, Queens Community Board 6 held a meeting on the proposed closure of the entrances to the station from the Union Turnpike underpass under Queens Boulevard. These entrances, which were used by people being dropped off or picked up by cars, had been already closed for more than a year during the reconstruction of the Interboro Parkway (now known as the Jackie Robinson Parkway). In August 1988, as part of the MTA's Arts for Transit program, a series of wooden sculptures depicting cirrus clouds made by Krystyna Spisak-Madejczyk, titled "Underground Skies-Cloud Forest", was installed on either side of the twenty support columns in the station's western mezzanine. $5,000 in funding for the project was provided by the MTA, with the Polish American Artist Society matching that contribution.

In July 2006, the MTA began work on an $13.9 million project to make the station compliant with the Americans with Disabilities Act of 1990. As part of the project, three elevators were installed in the station, one between each platform and the eastern mezzanine, and one from that mezzanine to the street. A ramp and cube-glass walls were installed in the passageway connecting the new elevator and the mezzanine. Other improvements that were part of the project included the addition of station agent booths that catered to wheelchair users, as well as new railings, station signs, station payphones, tactile yellow strips along the platforms, and platform fillings to reduce gaps between trains and platforms. The elevator installation was completed in July 2008.

== Station layout ==
This underground express station has four tracks and two island platforms. The F train stops on the outer local tracks at all times while the E stops on the center express tracks weekdays (Manhattan-bound from approximately 6:00 a.m. to 6:00 p.m., Jamaica-bound from 7:30 a.m. to 7:45 p.m.) and on the outer tracks at all other times. The next stop to the west is Forest Hills–71st Avenue for express trains and 75th Avenue for local trains. The next stop to the east is Briarwood for local trains, Jamaica–Van Wyck for weekday E express trains via the IND Archer Avenue Line, and Parsons Boulevard for limited rush-hour E express trains via the Queens Boulevard Line. During weekdays, this is the easternmost transfer point between the E and F trains before they branch off toward their eastern terminals.

Both outer track walls have a Jasmine yellow trim line with a black border and small "UNION TURNPIKE" captions below them in white lettering on black tiles. The tile band is part of a color-coded tile system used throughout the IND. The tile colors were designed to facilitate navigation for travelers going away from Lower Manhattan. As such, a different tile color is used at Parsons Boulevard, the next express station to the east. The yellow tiles used at the Union Turnpike station were also used at Briarwood and Sutphin Boulevard, the local stations between Union Turnpike and Parsons Boulevard.

Midnight blue I-beam columns run along both platforms, alternating ones having the standard black station name plate reading "Union T'pke" in white lettering. On many of the columns separating the express tracks are old white signs that read "UNION TPKE" in black lettering, though several have been removed.

=== Mezzanines ===
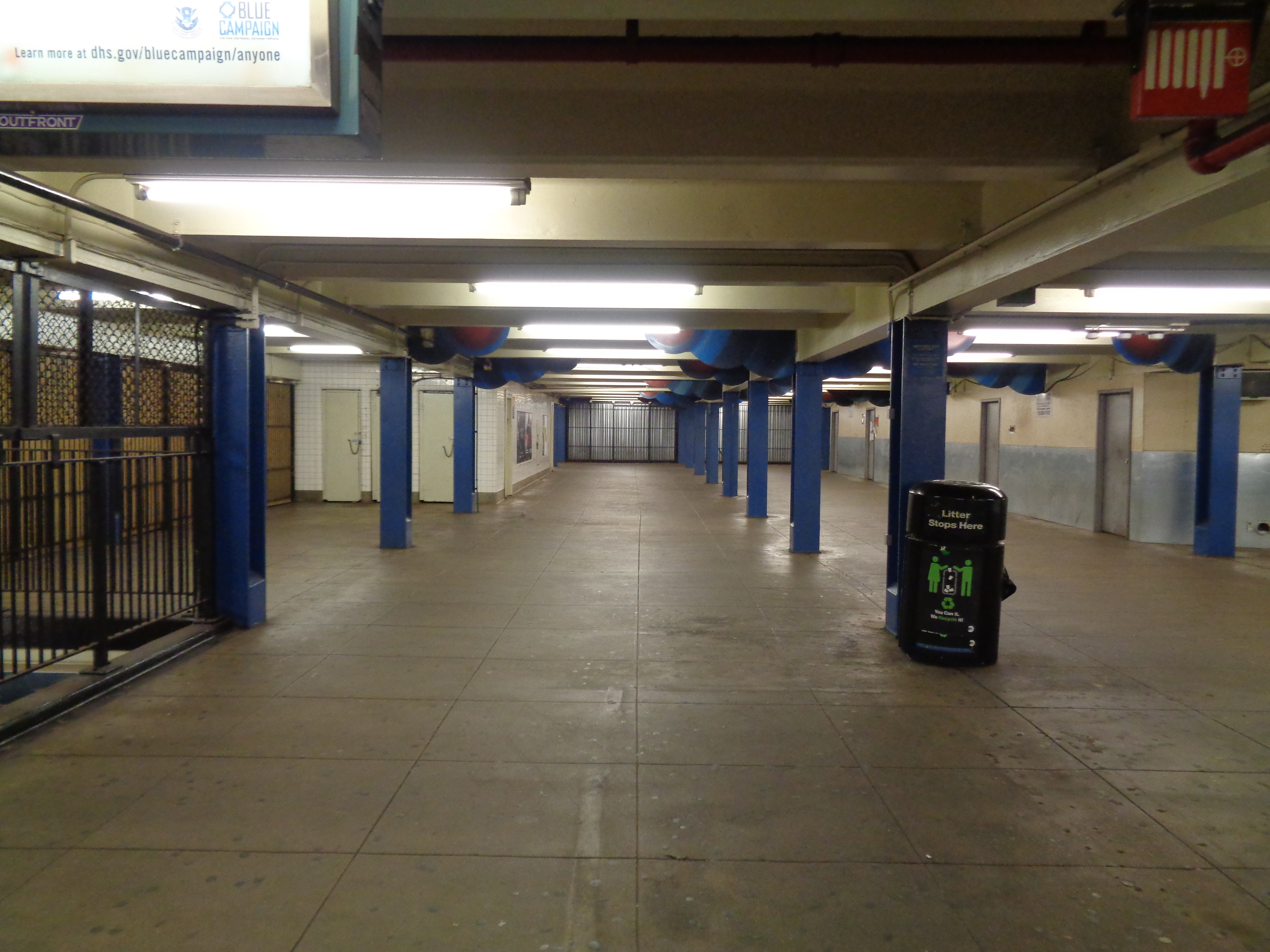
View of the station's western mezzanine

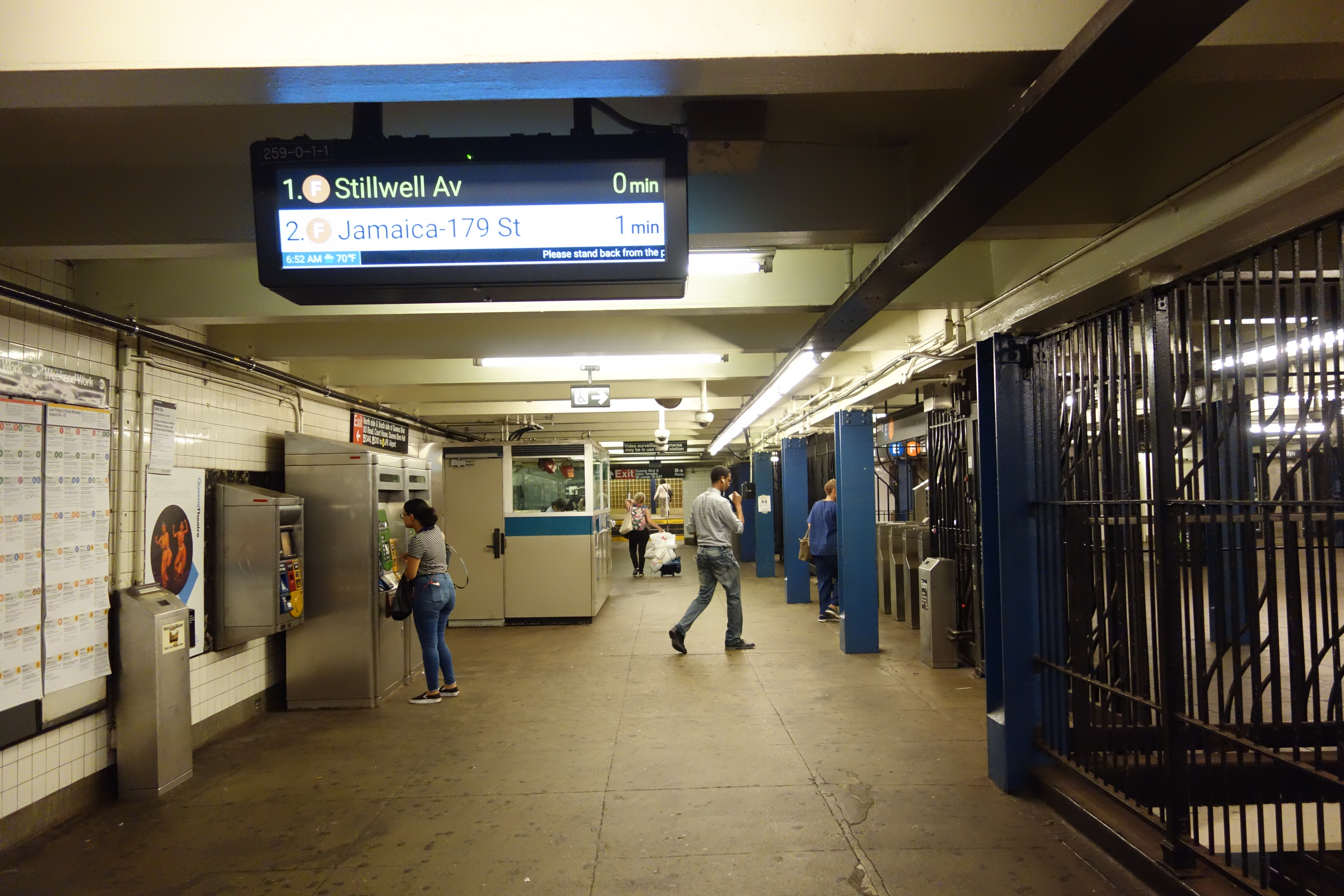
The station's eastern mezzanine

This station is unusual in that its mezzanine is split in two halves: one to the northwest of Union Turnpike, and one to the southeast. This is because Union Turnpike and the Jackie Robinson Parkway cross under Queens Boulevard at this location, but over the Queens Boulevard Line tracks. The mezzanine and the Union Turnpike underpass are on the same level, and Union Turnpike splits the mezzanine in half, with no connection between the two halves outside of fare control. Each mezzanine has three staircases leading to each platform. The eastern (railroad north) half of the mezzanine contains the station's full-time token booth. However, the western (railroad south) half, which serves riders of the heavily used Q45, Q46, Q48 bus lines that runs along Union Turnpike, had its token booth closed and removed. A piece of artwork, Underground Skies-Cloud Forest, that was designed by artist Krystyna Spisak-Madejczyk was installed in this half of the station mezzanine. This was a project of the Polish American Artist Society, and it was sponsored by the MTA Arts for Transit/Creative Stations Program.

The intersection of Union Turnpike and Queens Boulevard was grade-separated in conjunction with the construction of the subway station. This project cost $250,000. The construction of the underpass with a subway station underneath was a massive undertaking. Three levels were required in order for the underpass and the subway station to be built. The upper level that was built was Queens Boulevard, which carries traffic east and west. The second level is an underpass that carries four lanes of Union Turnpike (and now also the Jackie Robinson Parkway) under the Boulevard. The underpass is in between the two mezzanines and it would rest atop the roof of the subway station platform.

==== Exits ====
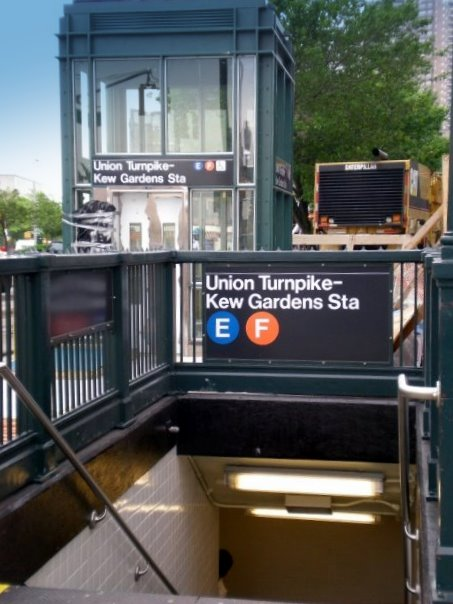
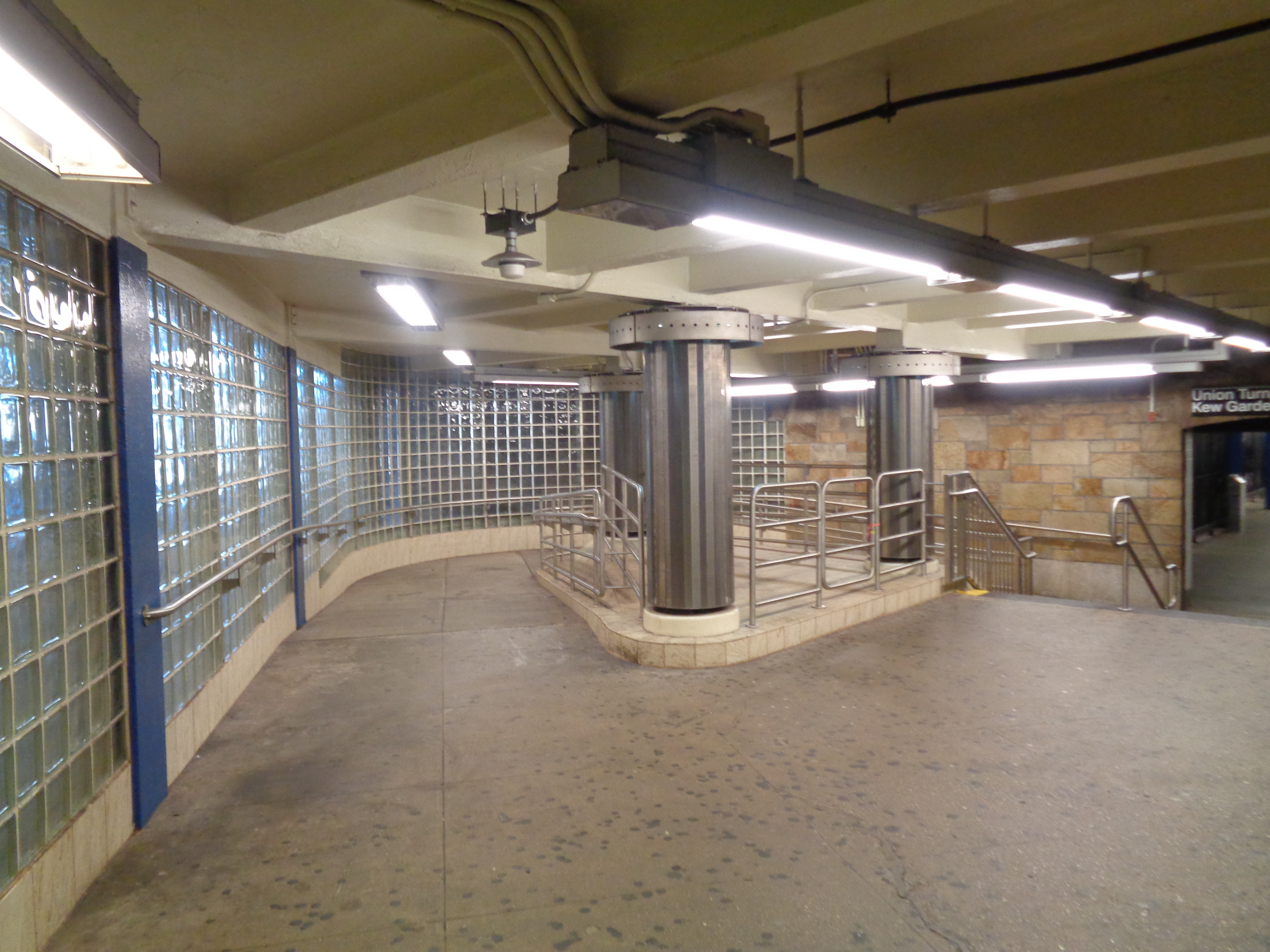
The southeastern stairway and elevator (left), and the new ramp and passageway between the elevator and eastern mezzanine (right), both completed in 2008

There are three sets of entrances from street level that lead to the station's mezzanine. To the western mezzanine, there are two staircases leading to the north side of Queens Boulevard east of 78th Avenue, adjacent to the Q45, Q46, and Q48 bus stop, and a single staircase leading to the south side of Queens Boulevard. Since the station is centered to the north side of Queens Boulevard, a longer passageway connects the mezzanine to the staircase on the south side of the street. To the eastern mezzanine, there are two staircases leading to 80th Road and Queens Boulevard, one for each side of the boulevard, and a staircase leading to the southeastern corner of Queens Boulevard and Union Turnpike. An elevator to this mezzanine is located adjacent to this staircase. In addition, walkways are located either side of the Union Turnpike underpass, which themselves lead to the mezzanine on their respective side. A staircase at the southeastern corner of Union Turnpike and Queens Boulevard, along with the street elevator, leads to the eastern walkway, which then feeds into the eastern mezzanine. A staircase at the northwestern corner of Union Turnpike and Queens Boulevard led to the western walkway, but both have been sealed and converted to employee facilities. Automobiles and buses were formerly allowed to drop off and pick up passengers along those walkways (similar to stations on the IND Concourse Line), but car access is currently blocked. The underpass is graded east to allow for natural drainage. The lower level of the station contains the subway tracks, which are located about 20 feet (6.1 m) below the underpass that carries Union Turnpike and the Jackie Robinson Parkway. While the open eastern walkway is blocked from the underpass with a cube-glass wall, the closed western walkway is blocked from the underpass with a chain-link fence.

=== Track layout ===
A signal and switch tower is located at the north end of the northbound platform.

There are two diamond crossovers near this station: one is located at the eastern end, for eastbound trains, and the other is located at the western end, for westbound trains. Each switch allow trains to cross-over between the local and express tracks in the same direction.

East of the station there is a flying junction that connects to the Jamaica Yard via a wye that curves east from the yard towards Briarwood. A second side of the wye curves west to become a lower level of the subway just west of the station. The yard itself is situated just north of the station in the southern portion of Flushing Meadows–Corona Park, between the Grand Central Parkway and the Van Wyck Expressway.

== Incidents ==
On August 28, 1987, a woman was dragged to death after her purse got caught in the doors of an F train at the station, one of 56 dragging incidents that year. This incident was investigated by the National Transportation Safety Board. Following this incident, the New York City Transit Authority (NYCTA) created a task force to investigate safety features that would reduce the number of draggings. The NYCTA installing closed-circuit televisions (CCTV) at three stations and platform mirrors at ten stations on a pilot basis so train conductors could better see around platform curves. In addition, the NYCTA experimented with ways to make train doors easier to open and a public relations campaign to increase awareness of the dangers of boarding trains as their doors closed. Following the pilot, the NYCTA began installing CCTV and mirrors at stations with curves more widely, including at this station.

== Ridership ==
In the 1970s, when the New York City Subway was at an all-time low, following the general trend of a decrease in ridership, the number of passengers using the Union Turnpike station decreased by 2.7 million passengers. In 2019, the station had 7,625,674 boardings, making it the 48th most used station in the 423-station system. This amounted to an average of 25,235 passengers per weekday.

== Nearby destinations ==
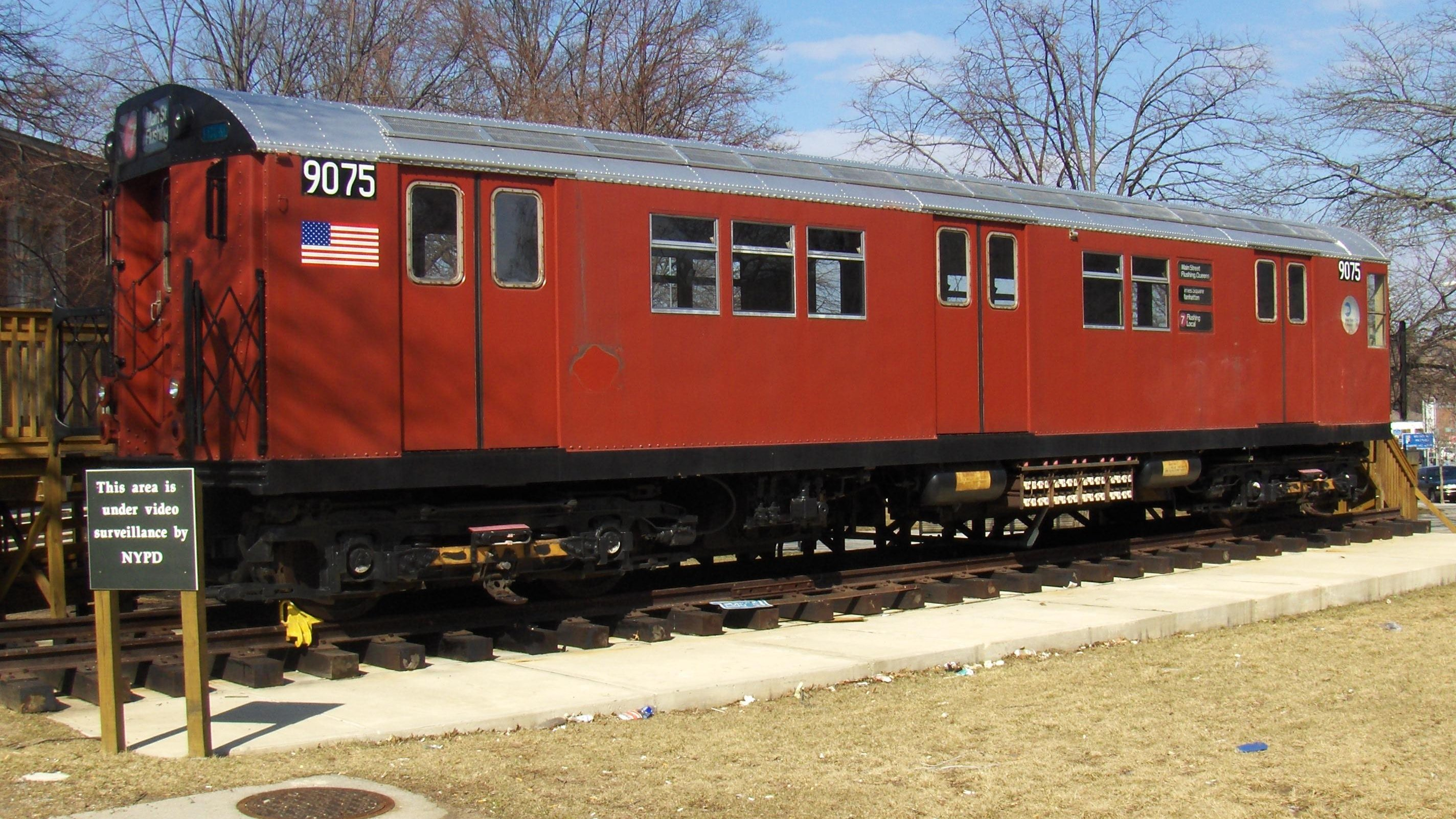
R33#9075 just east of the station at Queens Borough Hall at 82nd Avenue

The station is near the Queens Borough Hall, the Queens Criminal Court, and the Kew-Forest School. It is also close to the Forest Hills Tower, which has housed Plaza College since 2014 and also contains administrative offices for FEMA; it formerly housed the headquarters of JetBlue Airways and a public relations office for Con Edison, but the JetBlue office has since moved to the Brewster Building in Long Island City. A retired IRT redbird, R33 car 9075, was displayed at the east end of Queens Borough Hall on 82nd Avenue during the 2000s and 2010s. The Redbird car was formerly a visitor center for the Queens Borough Hall, but the visitor center closed in 2015 due to low patronage, and the car was later used as a filming location. Queens borough president Donovan Richards placed the subway car for auction in June 2022; it was sold to a private citizen for $235,700.
