= 75th Avenue station =

New York City Subway station in Queens

75 Avenue
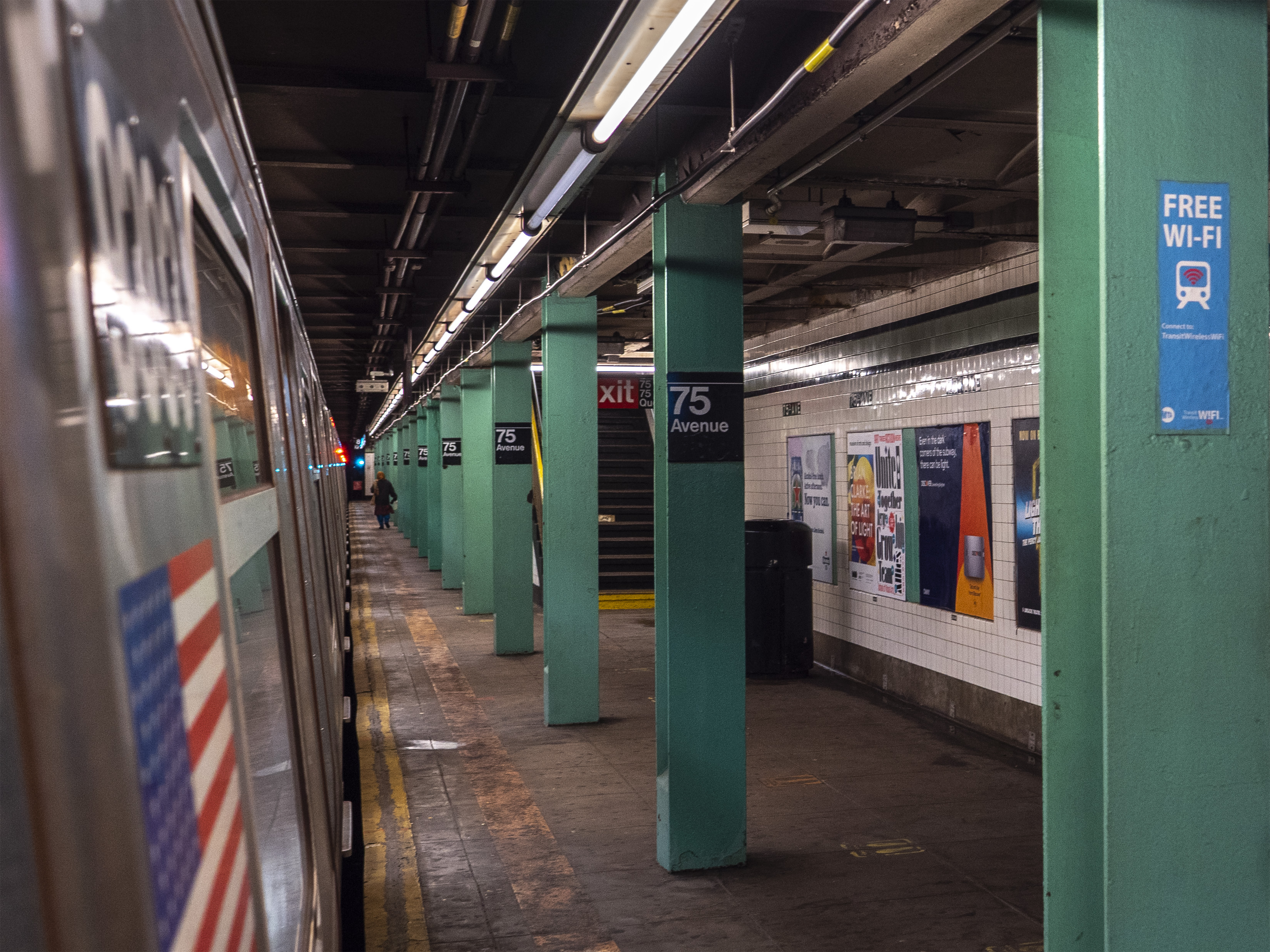
- View of northbound platform

Station statistics
- Address: 75th Avenue & Queens Boulevard; Forest Hills, New York
- Borough: Queens
- Locale: Forest Hills
- Coordinates: 40.71864°N 73.837738°W
- Division: B (IND)
- Line: IND Queens Boulevard Line
- Services: E (nights after 9:00 p.m., weekends, and limited a.m. rush hour trips); F (all times) <F> (two rush hour trains, reverse peak direction)
- Transit: MTA Bus: Q60, QM11, QM18
- Structure: Underground
- Platforms: 2 side platforms
- Tracks: 4

Other information
- Opened: December 31, 1936; 89 years ago
- Former/other names: 75th Avenue–Puritan Avenue

Traffic
- 2025: 765,491 ▲2.9%
- Rank: 347 out of 423
Services
Preceding station	New York City Subway	Following station
Forest Hills–71st Avenue E F <F> toward Coney Island–Stillwell Avenue	Local	Kew Gardens–Union Turnpike E F <F> toward Jamaica–179th Street
Location
Location within New York City Subway
Location within New York City
Location within New York
Track layout
Upper level
Lower level
Street map
Station service legend
Symbol	Description
Stops all times	Stops all times
Stops late nights and weekends	Stops late nights and weekends
Stops rush hours in the peak direction only (limited service)	Stops rush hours in the peak direction only (limited service)

The 75th Avenue station (originally the 75th Avenue–Puritan Avenue station) is a local station on the IND Queens Boulevard Line of the New York City Subway. Located at the intersection of 75th Avenue and Queens Boulevard in Forest Hills, Queens, it is served by the F train at all times, the E train at all times except weekday rush hours and middays, and the <F> train during rush hours in the reverse peak direction.

The station opened on December 31, 1936, as a station along the Independent Subway System's Queens Boulevard Line. The opening of the station brought significant growth to the adjacent community of Forest Hills, transforming it from a quiet residential community to an active population center.

== History ==
=== Construction and opening ===
The Queens Boulevard Line was one of the first built by the city-owned Independent Subway System (IND), and was planned to stretch between the IND Eighth Avenue Line in Manhattan and 178th Street and Hillside Avenue in Jamaica, Queens, with a stop at 75th Avenue. The line was first proposed in 1925. Construction of the line was approved by the New York City Board of Estimate on October 4, 1928. As planned, 75th Avenue was to be a local stop; it would be one of 22 total stops on the line between Seventh Avenue in Manhattan and 178th Street in Queens. The line was constructed using the cut-and-cover tunneling method, and to allow pedestrians to cross, temporary bridges were built over the trenches.

Early planning documents called for a station at "Queens Boulevard–Puritan Avenue"; Puritan Avenue was the name for 75th Road in Forest Hills Gardens. For the first few years of operation the station was referred to as Puritan Avenue. The design called for a small mezzanine but 75th Avenue was built with a full one as it was cheaper than filling in the excavation.

The first section of the line opened on August 19, 1933, from the connection to the Eighth Avenue Line at 50th Street to Roosevelt Avenue in Jackson Heights. Later that year, a $23 million loan was approved to finance the remainder of the line, along with other IND lines. The remainder of the line was built by the Public Works Administration. In 1934 and 1935, construction of the extension to Jamaica was suspended for 15 months and was halted by strikes. Construction was further delayed due to a strike in 1935, instigated by electricians opposing wages paid by the General Railway Signal Company. In August 1936, tracks were installed all the way to 178th Street, and the stations to Union Turnpike were completed. On December 31, 1936, the IND Queens Boulevard Line was extended by eight stops, and 3.5 miles (5.6 km), from its previous terminus at Roosevelt Avenue to Union Turnpike.

The construction of the extension to Kew Gardens brought significant growth to Queens, specifically in Forest Hills and Kew Gardens. With the subway providing a quick and cheap commute, Forest Hills became a more desirable place to live, and as a result new apartment buildings were built in advance of the line's opening to accommodate the expected influx of residents. Forest Hills was transformed from a quiet residential community of one-family houses to an active population center.

Between July and October 1938, the entrance to the southeastern corner of 75th Road and Queens Boulevard opened. This entrance opened due to increased ridership from six new apartment buildings in the area. The owners of these six new apartment buildings, Cord Meyer Development Company, local homeowners, and civic associations placed pressure on the New York City Board of Transportation to open the entrance in July 1938. On December 15, 1940, F trains began running via the newly opened IND Sixth Avenue Line and along the Queens Boulevard Line's express tracks; they skipped the 75th Avenue station.

=== Platform extensions ===
In 1953, the platforms at six Queens Boulevard Line stations, including 75th Avenue, were lengthened to allow eleven-car trains. (Note: The subway cars on the IND were built to be 60 feet (18.3 m) long. These cars typically operated in 10-car trains, with an entire train length being 600 feet (182.9 m). When platforms at stations such as 75th Avenue were lengthened to accommodate 11-car trains, the platforms had to be extended an additional car length, or 60 feet, making the platform at least 660 feet (201.2 m) long.) The New York City Board of Transportation had announced plans in November 1949 to spend $325,000 extending platforms at several IND stations, including 75th Avenue, to accommodate 11-car trains; the bid for the project went out in 1951. The lengthened trains began running during rush hour on September 8, 1953. Eleven-car trains would only operate on weekdays. The extra car increased the total carrying capacity by 4,000 passengers. The lengthening project cost $400,000 (equivalent to $4.81 million in 2025). The operation of eleven-car trains ended in 1958 because of operational difficulties. The signal blocks, especially in Manhattan, were too short to accommodate the longer trains, and the motormen had a very small margin of error to properly platform the train. It was found that operating ten-car trains allowed for two additional trains per hour to be scheduled.

== Station layout ==
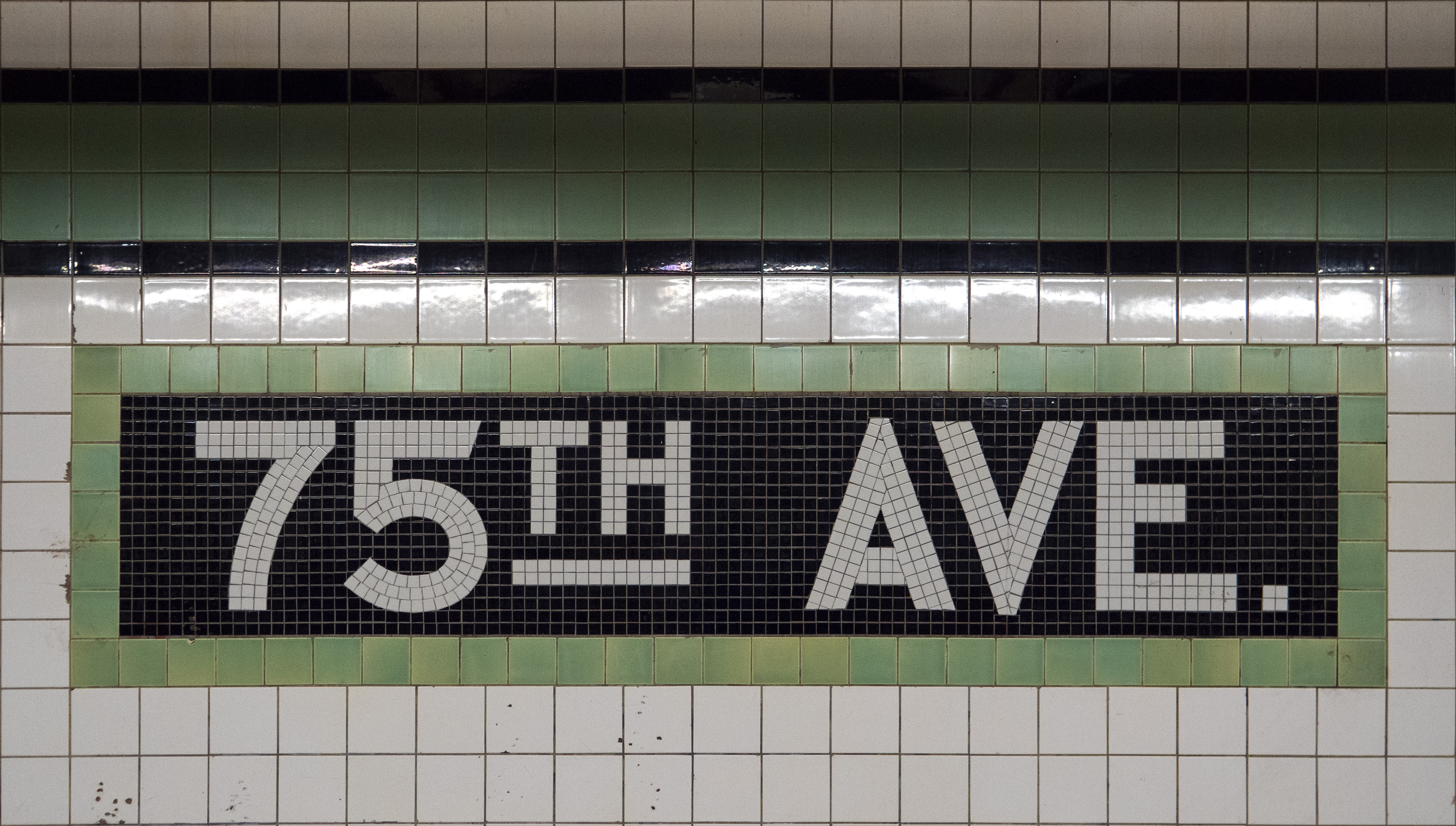
Mosaic name tablet

This local station has four tracks and two side platforms. The F train stops here at all times, while the E train stops here during evenings, late nights, and weekends. The E train uses the two center tracks to bypass this station weekdays (Manhattan-bound from approximately 6:00 a.m. to 6:30 p.m., Jamaica-bound from 7:30 a.m. to 8:00 p.m.). The station is between Forest Hills–71st Avenue to the west and Kew Gardens–Union Turnpike to the east.

Both platforms have a light Fern green trim line with a black border and "75TH AVE" tile captions in white lettering on a black background beneath them. There are mosaic name tablets reading "75TH AVE." in white sans-serif font on a black background with a light Fern green border, and beneath them are directional tile signs in white lettering on a black background pointing to the exits. The tile band is part of a color-coded tile system used throughout the IND. The tile colors were designed to facilitate navigation for travelers going away from Lower Manhattan. As such, a different tile color is used at Kew Gardens–Union Turnpike, the next express station to the east. The green tiles used at the 75th Avenue station was also used at the next station to the west, Forest Hills–71st Avenue, which is an express station.

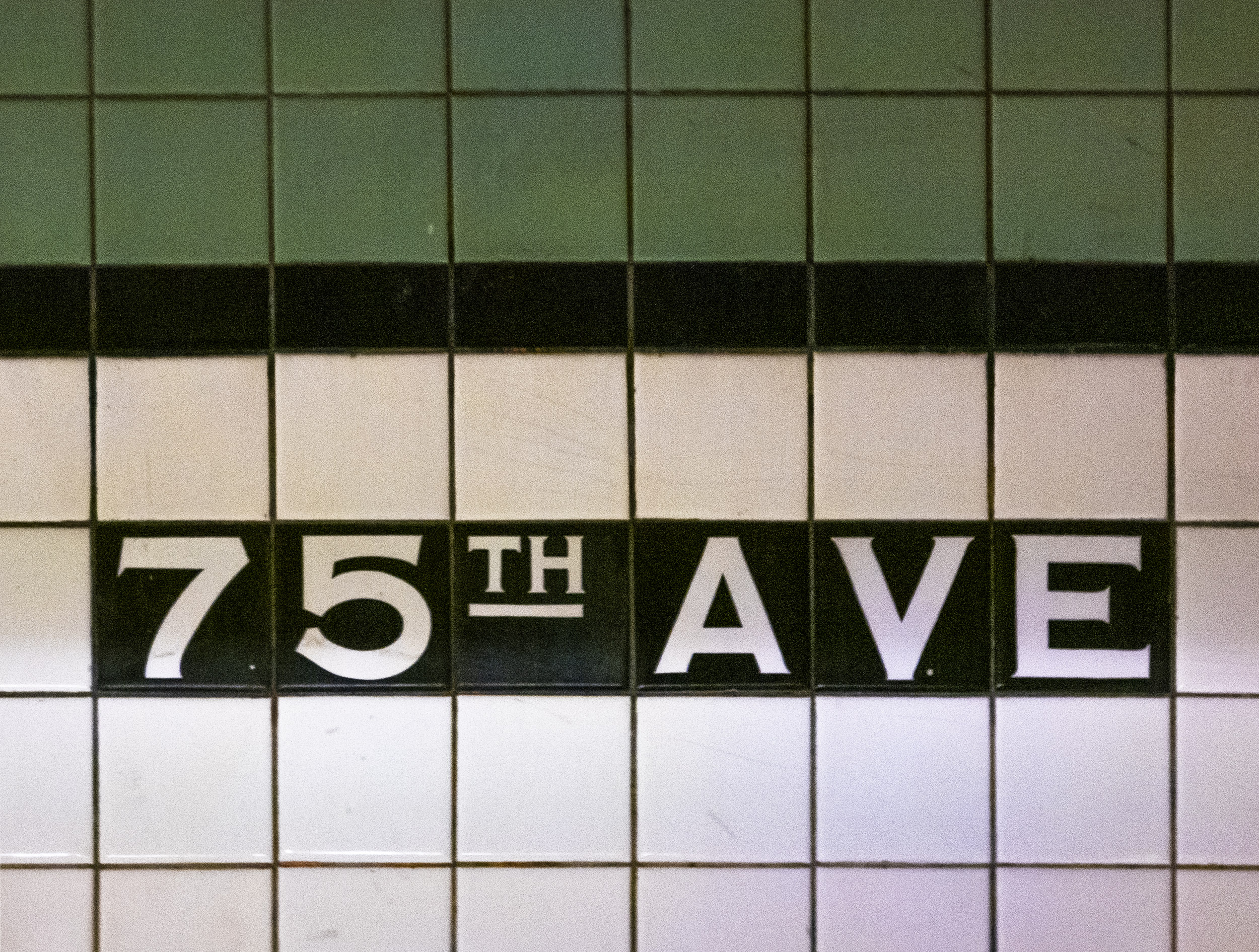
Tile caption

Fixed platform barriers, which are intended to prevent commuters falling to the tracks, are positioned near the platform edges. Emerald green I-beam columns run along both platforms at regular intervals, alternating ones having the standard black station name plate with white lettering. The trackside columns have old white "75TH AVE" signs on them in black lettering. The former name of Puritan Avenue was still reflected on platform signage into the 1990s. The I-beam piers on the platforms are located every 15 feet (4.6 m) and support girders above the platforms. The roof girders are also connected to columns in the walls adjoining each platform.

The tunnel is covered by a U-shaped trough that contains utility pipes and wires. The outer walls of this trough are composed of columns, spaced approximately every 5 feet (1.5 m) with concrete infill between them. There is a 1-inch (25 mm) gap between the tunnel wall and the platform wall, which is made of 4-inch (100 mm)-thick brick covered over by a tiled finish. The columns between the tracks are also spaced every 5 feet (1.5 m), with no infill.

=== Exits ===
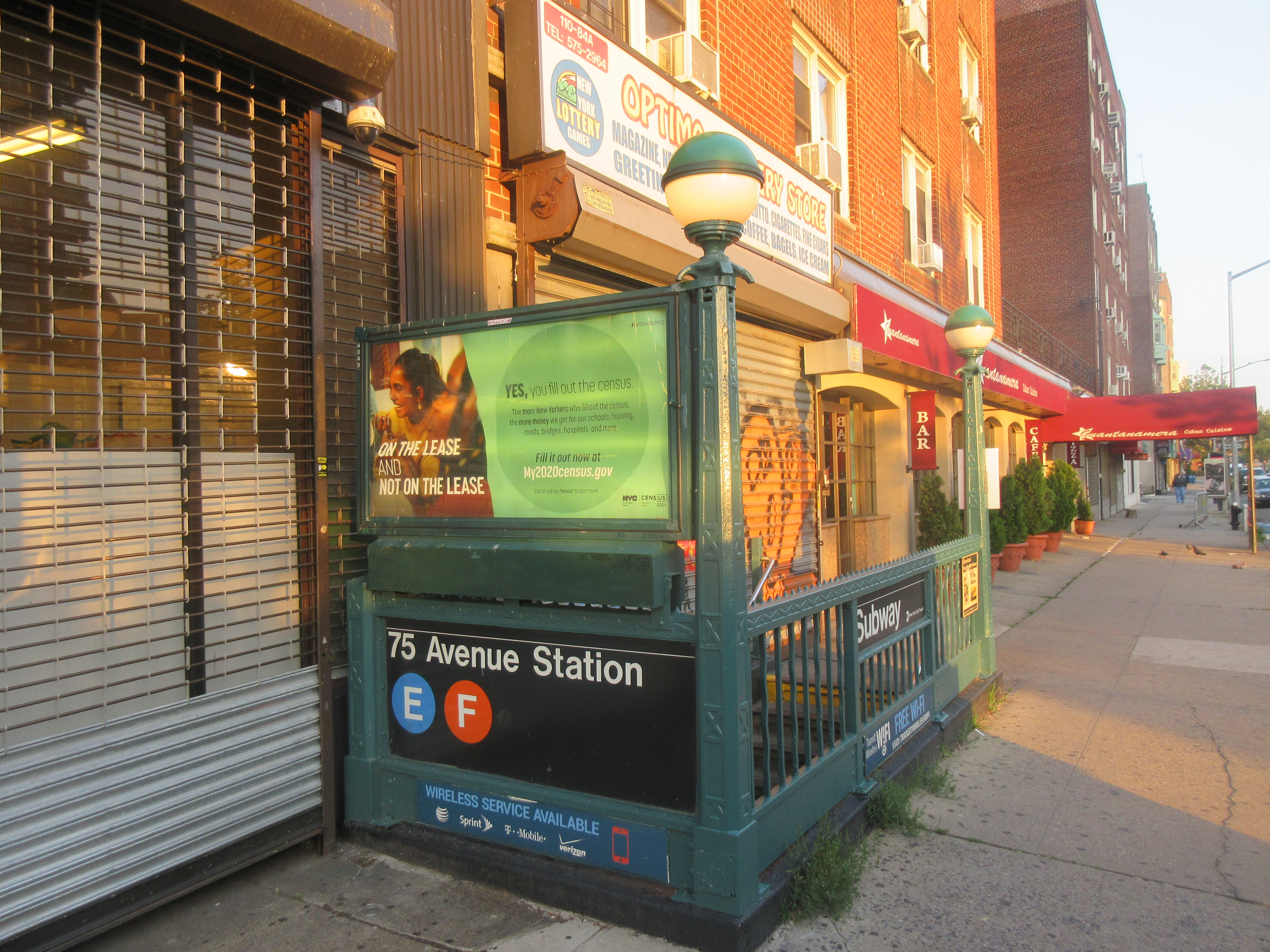
Station entrance on the south side of Queens Boulevard

The station has a full-length mezzanine above the platforms and tracks. All of the mezzanine is still completely open, with the exception of a tiny closed fenced-off section at the station's eastern end that is accessed from a single closed staircase on the Manhattan-bound platform. However, it is set up in a way that does not allow a free transfer between directions, as the fare control is located in the middle of the mezzanine. The token booth and turnstile banks for either direction are at the center. HEET turnstiles are at either ends near the station's entrances and exits, both of which have two street stairs. The entrance at the west (railroad south) end leads to the northwest corner and southwest corners of Queens Boulevard and 75th Avenue, while the one on the east (railroad north) end leads to southeast corner of Queens Boulevard and 75th Road. Chain-link fences separate the sections of the mezzanine within fare control and the section out of fare control. The section of the mezzanine within fare control used to span across the entire space, but a fare-free underpass under Queens Boulevard now divides the northbound and southbound parts of the mezzanine, and there is no way to make a free transfer between the two platforms anymore.

=== Track layout ===
There are a pair of diamond crossovers near the western end of this station, located between the local and express tracks in each direction. F trains use these at all times, switching from express to local for the remainder of their route east (railroad north) to its terminal at Jamaica–179th Street station. E trains only use them on weekdays during the evening and on weekends during the day. The stretch of local track between 71st Avenue and 75th Avenue is only used in revenue service during late nights, when E and F trains both run local.

There are also four tracks underneath this station, which are not visible from the platforms. An emergency exit located in the middle of the Jamaica-bound platform leads to this lower level. The two outer tracks lead to Jamaica Yard while the two center tracks are used for reversing local trains from Forest Hills–71st Avenue and end at bumper blocks just below Kew Gardens–Union Turnpike station under the mainline tracks. The two center tracks used for reversing local trains can be seen from Jamaica-bound express trains. At the west end of the station, there are two punch boxes, one on the local and express tracks.

== Ridership ==
In the 1970s, when the New York City Subway was at an all-time low, following the general trend of a decrease in ridership, the number of passengers using the 75th Avenue station decreased by 300,000 passengers. In 2019, the station had 1,059,027 boardings, making it the 351st most used station in the 423-station system. This amounted to an average of 3,549 passengers per weekday.
