= Jamaica–179th Street station =

New York City Subway station in Queens

Jamaica–179 Street
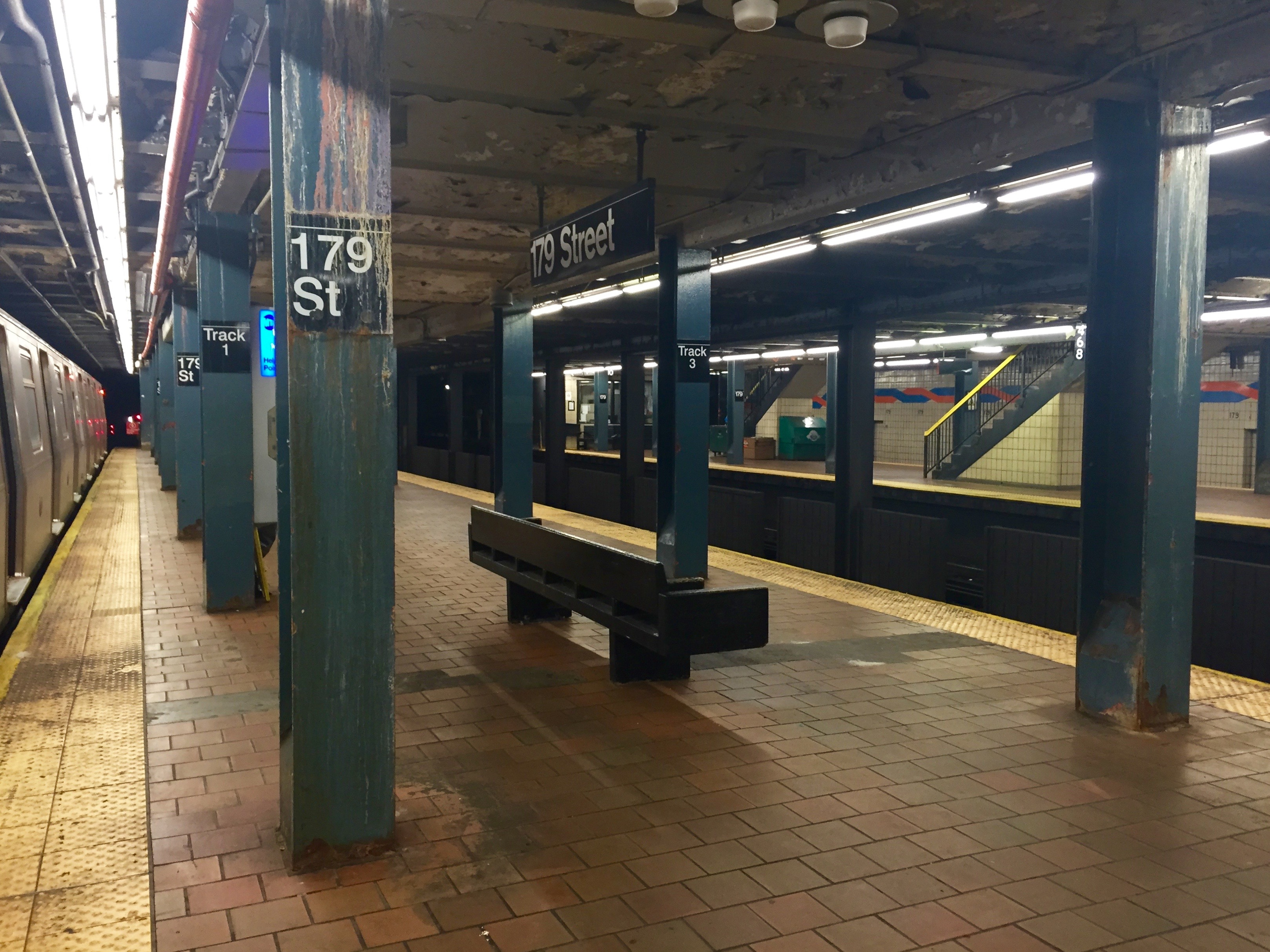
- Manhattan-bound platform. An R160 F train is visible on the Manhattan-bound local track.

Station statistics
- Address: 179th Street & Hillside Avenue; Queens, New York
- Borough: Queens
- Locale: Jamaica, Jamaica Estates
- Coordinates: 40.712459°N 73.78448°W
- Division: B (IND)
- Line: IND Queens Boulevard Line
- Services: E (limited rush-hour service); F (all times) <F> (two rush hour trains, peak direction)
- Transit: NYCT Bus: Q1, Q2, Q3, Q17, Q36, Q43, Q76, Q77, Q82, QM68; NICE Bus: n1, n6, n6X, n22, n22X, n24, n26
- Structure: Underground
- Platforms: 2 island platforms
- Tracks: 4

Other information
- Opened: December 11, 1950 (75 years ago)
- Accessible: Yes

Traffic
- 2025: 3,965,835 ▼0.8%
- Rank: 87 out of 423
Services
Preceding station	New York City Subway	Following station
Parsons Boulevard E express	Local	Terminus
169th Street F <F> toward Coney Island–Stillwell Avenue	Local	Terminus
Location
Location within New York City Subway
Location within New York City
Location within New York
Track layout
Upper level
Lower level (east of station)
Street map
Station service legend
Symbol	Description
Stops all times	Stops all times
Stops rush hours only	Stops rush hours only
Stops rush hours in the peak direction only (limited service)	Stops rush hours in the peak direction only (limited service)

The Jamaica–179th Street station is an express terminal station on the IND Queens Boulevard Line of the New York City Subway. Located under Hillside Avenue at 179th Street in Jamaica, Queens, it is served by the F train at all times, the <F> train during rush hours in the reverse peak direction, and a few rush-hour E trains. The station has 15 entrances, including two at Midland Parkway in Jamaica Estates.

Jamaica–179th Street was opened on December 11, 1950, although a station had been planned at 178th Street as early as 1928. At the time, the Queens Boulevard Line was part of the Independent Subway System (IND), but the original IND plans did not provide for constructing the 178th Street station until the line was extended even further to Queens Village. The line opened to 169th Street, the next station west, in 1937. Various changes in plans, as well as material shortages due to the Great Depression and World War II, delayed the project until 1946. Jamaica–179th Street became among Queens' busiest upon its 1950 opening. After a period of deterioration, the station was renovated in the 1980s and again in the 2000s. As a result of planning for a never-built expansion to Queens Village, the station has eight storage tracks to its east, giving it the highest peak capacity of any New York City Subway station. The station is announced as 179th Street on E trains.

== History ==
The 179th Street station (drawn up as 178th Street) had been planned along with the rest of the IND Queens Boulevard Line as its original terminus as early as 1928. In December 1930, however, it was planned to construct stations only up to 169th Street, with tail tracks and switches installed up to the foot of the station at 178th Street, along with a provision for the station. The tracks ended at bumper blocks, and the tunnel at a bulkhead. Under these plans, the 178th Street station would be built during a further eastward extension. The Queens Boulevard Line was extended up to 169th Street on April 24, 1937, with the tail tracks and switches used to store and reverse trains. The 169th Street station provided an unsatisfactory terminal setup for a four-track line: there were no storage facilities provided at the 169th Street station, and since 169th Street was a local station, trains on the outer local tracks had to cross over to the inner express tracks to reverse direction.

Calls from the local community to build a new station at 178th Street occurred as early as 1932; several of these requests came from the Jamaica Estates Association. In June 1936, the association petitioned Mayor Fiorello H. LaGuardia for the extension. As early as 1936, the New York City Board of Transportation (predecessor to the New York City Transit Authority and the MTA) was evaluating construction of the station along with further eastward extensions of the line, with the board's 1940 budget allocating funding for the station. Under the 1940 plans, construction of the station was set to take place between 1941 and 1945.

In January 1941, city councilman James A. Burke proposed extending the line to 178th Street, in order to relieve congestion at 169th Street. Burke believed that a station could be built within the existing tunnel and trackage and cost only $100,000, while engineers from the Board of Transportation stated it would require additional tunneling and new relay tracks extending to 184th Street. In July 1941, the Board of Transportation requested funding for a new express terminal station to replace 169th Street. Construction was delayed, however, due to material shortages caused by the Great Depression, and further delayed due to the onset of World War II.

The plans for the station were approved after the war in 1946, in order to "provide a more satisfactory terminal" for the line. A groundbreaking ceremony was held on March 5, 1947, at 182nd Street and Hillside Avenue, with Mayor William O'Dwyer and now-borough president Burke in attendance. A bus terminal accompanying the station, similar to the 165th Street Bus Terminal, was initially planned for the station but never built. The station opened on December 11, 1950, at the cost of over $10 million; Mayor Vincent R. Impellitteri and Queens Borough President Maurice A. FitzGerald attended the opening. It was the last subway station whose construction was funded by New York City, until the construction of the 34th Street–Hudson Yards station on the 7 Subway Extension beginning in 2008. Upon opening, the station became a major transit hub for passengers from south and east Queens and Nassau County, and led to increased development in Jamaica. By 1959, the station was the busiest in Queens.

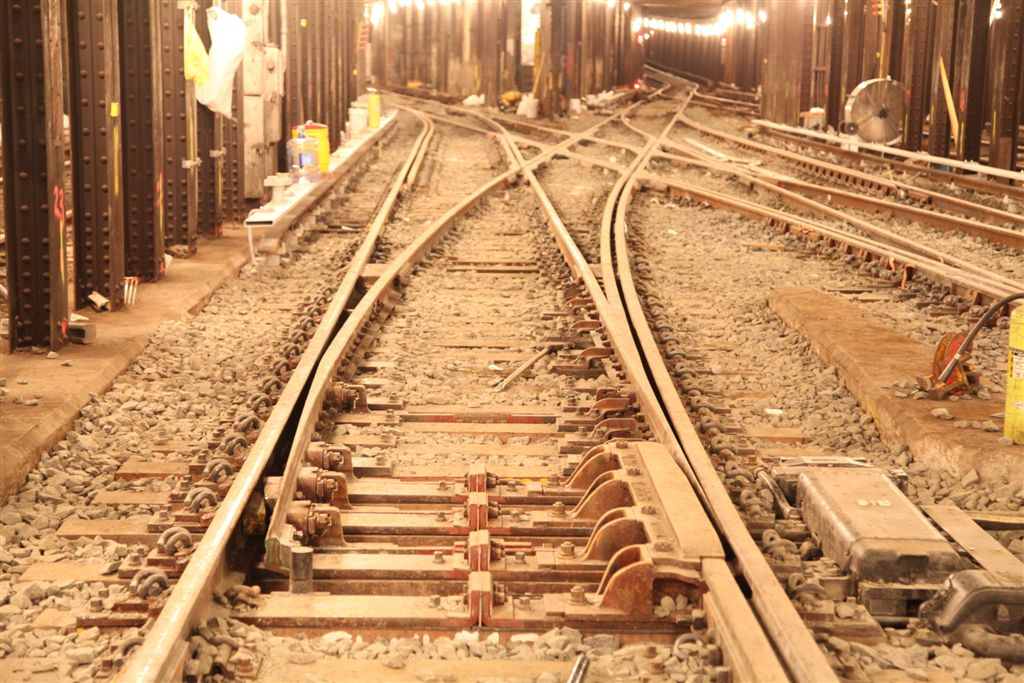
The western end of the lower relay yard; ramps can be seen going up to platform level

In 1981, the MTA listed the 179th Street station among the 69 most deteriorated stations in the subway system. Later in the 1980s, the station was renovated and modernized; as part of the renovation, the IND-style purple tile band was removed from the station walls, and a design with intertwining blue and orange stripes was added. In 2002, the Metropolitan Transportation Authority announced that elevators would be installed at the 179th Street station. Subsequently, elevators were installed in the station to make it ADA-accessible. The elevators were opened around 2005. Starting in August 2007, the MTA began installing decorative ventilation grates along Hillside Avenue above the station, and sealing other grates, both in order to combat flooding. At the time, the Hillside Avenue subway was considered the most flood-prone area in the subway system. The MTA announced in late 2025 that a customer service center would open at the station.

=== Service history ===
Initially, E trains served the station at all times, while F trains only operated to the station during late nights. In 1951, F trains were extended to 179th Street during the day as well. In 1953, the platforms at several IND stations were lengthened to allow eleven-car trains; originally, service was provided with ten-car trains. (Note: The platforms at 75th Avenue and Sutphin Boulevard on the Queens Boulevard Line were lengthened to allow 11-car operation on the E and F routes. The subway cars on the IND were built to be 60 feet (18.3 m) long. These cars typically operated in 10-car trains, with an entire train length being 600 feet (182.9 m). When platforms at stations were lengthened to accommodate 11-car trains, the platforms had to be extended an additional car length, or 60 feet (18.3 m), making the platform at least 660 feet (201.2 m) long.) The lengthened trains began running during rush hour on September 8, 1953. Eleven-car trains would only operate on weekdays. The extra car increased the total carrying capacity by 4,000 passengers. The operation of eleven-car trains ended in 1958 because of operational difficulties. The signal blocks, especially in Manhattan, were too short to accommodate the longer trains, and the motormen had a very small margin of error to properly platform the train. It was found that operating ten-car trains allowed for two additional trains per hour to be scheduled.

179th Street served as the full-time northern terminal for both Queens Boulevard express services (the E and F trains), which led to congestion at the station, until December 11, 1988, when the E was rerouted to the Archer Avenue Subway. The R served the station from 1988 to 1992, but only provided rush-hour service after 1990. G trains also served this station during late nights from 1990 to 1997 as a replacement for the R as it was cut back to 36th Street. Late night G service to this station was replaced by F trains on August 30, 1997.

Starting in 2001, selected rush-hour E trains began running to 179th Street, making express stops along Hillside Avenue, due to capacity constraints at Jamaica Center. Starting on August 28, 2023, and continuing through the first quarter of 2024, E service to 179th Street was temporarily suspended.

== Station layout ==
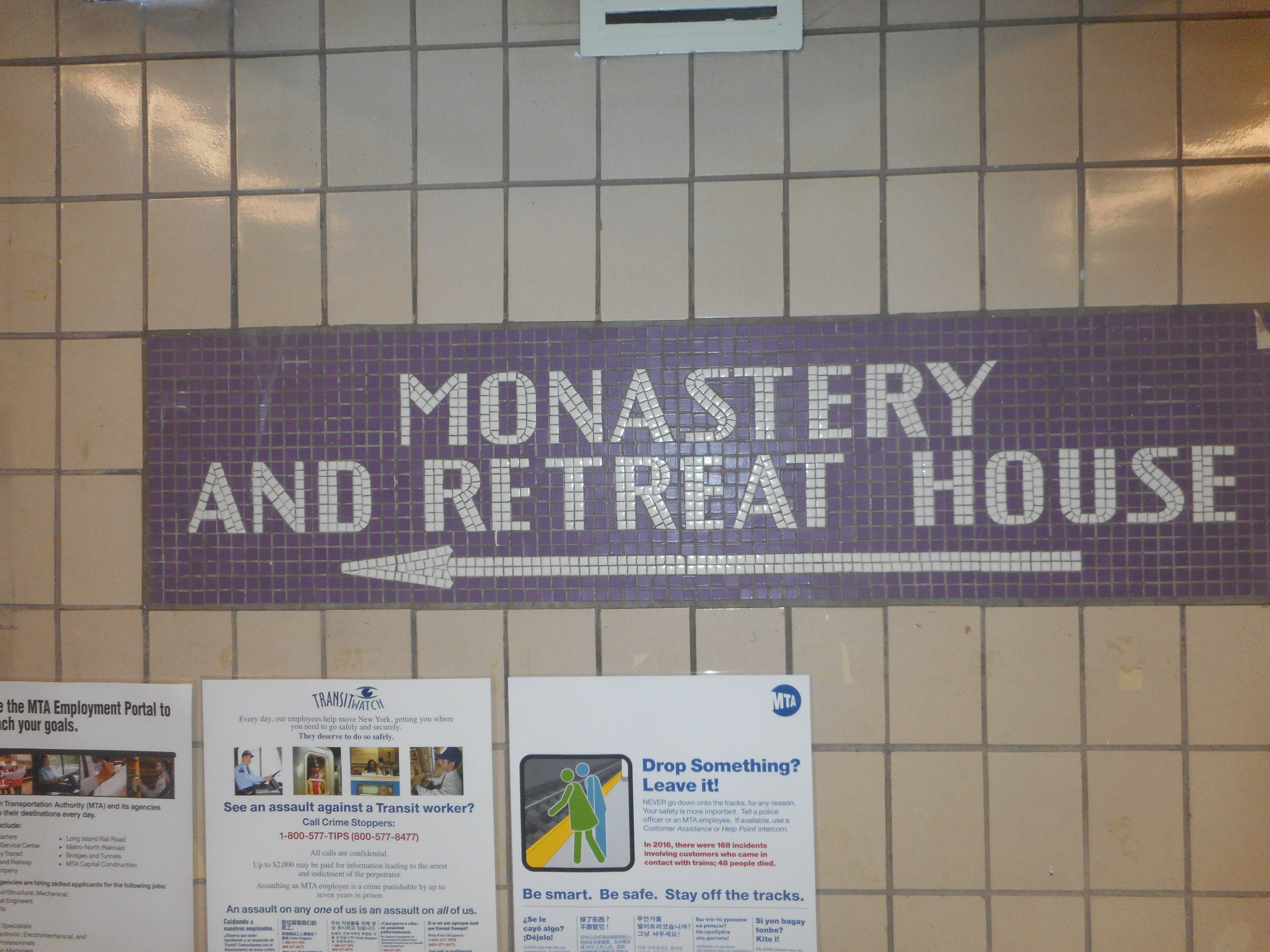
Mosaics directing to the Monastery and Retreat House

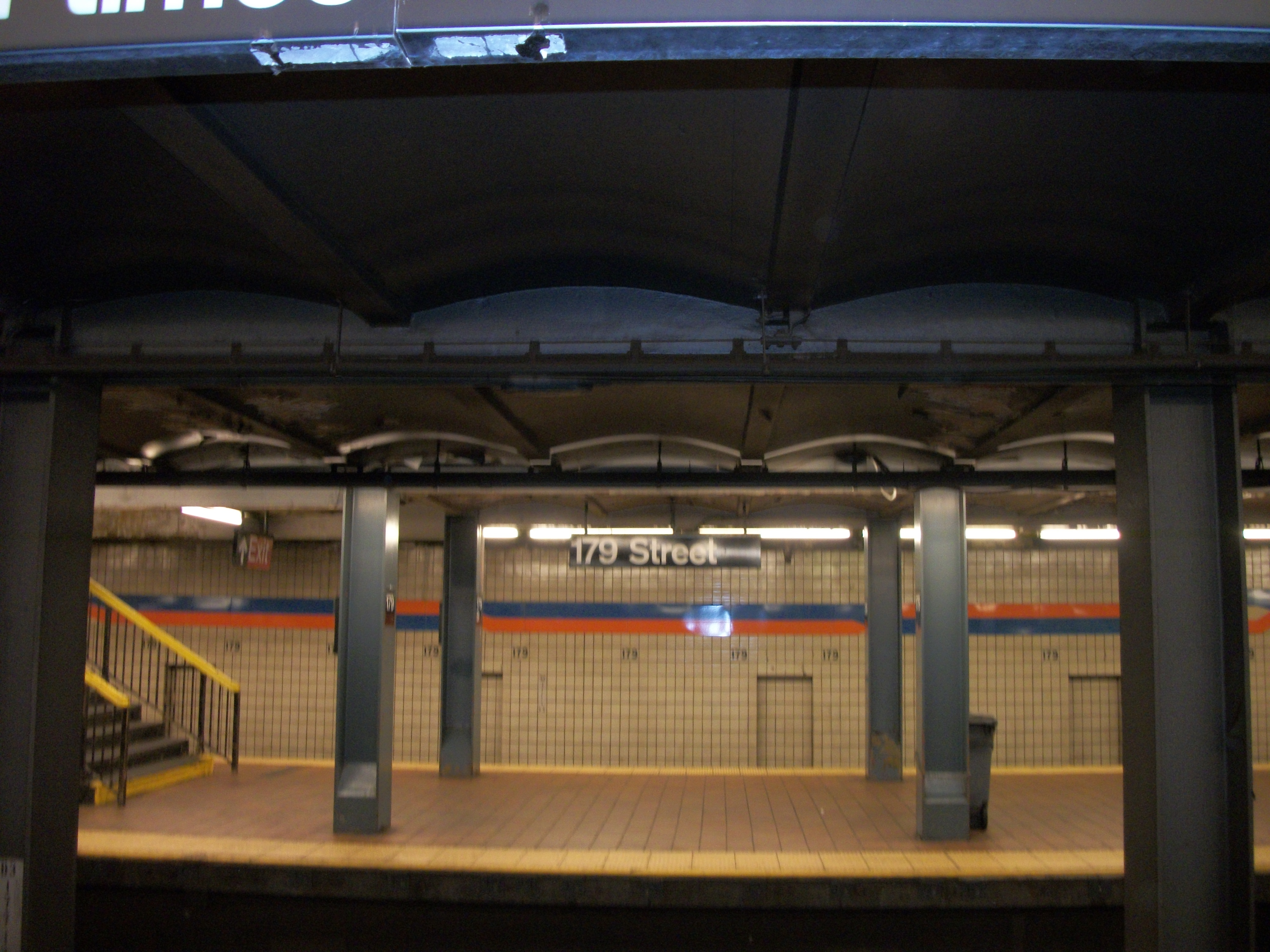
View across the platform showing the intertwined wall design

This underground station is identical to a typical express station, with four tracks and two island platforms. F trains serve the station at all times, and infrequent rush hour E trains also serve the station. The station is the railroad north terminus of all service. To the west (railroad south), the next stop is 169th Street for local trains and Parsons Boulevard for express trains.

To the east is a large storage and relay yard consisting of two levels with four relay tracks each, extending approximately .25 miles (0.40 km) to around 184th Place. (Note: Some sources state that the relay tracks end at 184th Street. Others state that the tracks extend to 184th Place/185th Street or 186th Street.) This total of eight storage tracks gives 179th Street the highest peak terminal capacity of any station in the New York City Subway: 63 trains per hour, or one train every 57 seconds, although the station currently operates at a far lower throughput (only 17–18 trains per hour during peak hours). (Note: A maximum of 14 to 15 F trains per hour operate from the station during peak hours, while three E trains per hour depart or arrive at the station during peak hours only. Under MTA standards, the station could facilitate up to 15 trains per hour from two full-time services, a total of 30 trains per hour.) Terminating trains enter on one of the two northbound tracks, then relay to one of the two levels—the upper level if coming from the express track, or the lower level if coming from the local track. They then return on the corresponding track on the southbound side. Southbound trains may leave from either the local or express tracks, although F trains departing from the express track switch to the local track east of 169th Street. Outside of relay operations, the yard provides storage for four trains. It is estimated that the relay tracks east of the station can fit about 600 passenger automobiles.

The station has beige wall tiles with intertwining blue and orange stripes, representing the two colors of the New York City flag, and the colors of the IND Eighth Avenue and Sixth Avenue lines which serve the station. There are two fare control areas. The full-time area at the east end of the station, between 179th and 180th Streets, has a token booth and a bank of 12 turnstiles and two high-exit-only turnstiles. The part-time exit at 178th Street contains a nine-turnstile bank, two high exit entrance turnstiles (HEETs), and two high exit turnstiles. The two ends are connected by a full-length mezzanine, which features Our Spectrum of Support artwork by Reginald Polynice, a set of plywood cutout figures appearing to hold up the ceiling of the mezzanine. The station also features a control tower. The station is ADA-accessible via an elevator installed at 179th Place on the north side of Hillside Avenue.

The station lies about 3.25 miles (5.23 km) west of the city's border with Nassau County. Until the IND Rockaway Line was opened in 1956, and until the 1958 opening of the line's Far Rockaway–Mott Avenue terminal (which is about 0.5 miles (0.80 km) from the city's border with Nassau County), 179th Street was the closest subway station to Nassau County. New York Magazine described the station's location as being in "a neighborhood so outer-borough it might as well be in another state"—namely, one of "hip-hop’s fertile crescents" where rappers 50 Cent and Ja Rule grew up.

=== Extension provisions ===
The configuration of the relay tracks is evidence of the original plans to build an extension of the Queens Boulevard Line further east into Queens. The line would have continued under Hillside Avenue to Springfield Boulevard and Braddock Avenue (both formerly Rocky Hill Road) in Queens Village, with later plans to extend the line to Little Neck Parkway in Bellerose near the Nassau County border. The upper level was to be extended eastward while the lower level tracks were always intended to be relay tracks. The tracks on the upper level are longer than the lower level tracks and the upper level tracks have a wooden partition at the bumper blocks.

=== Entrances and exits ===
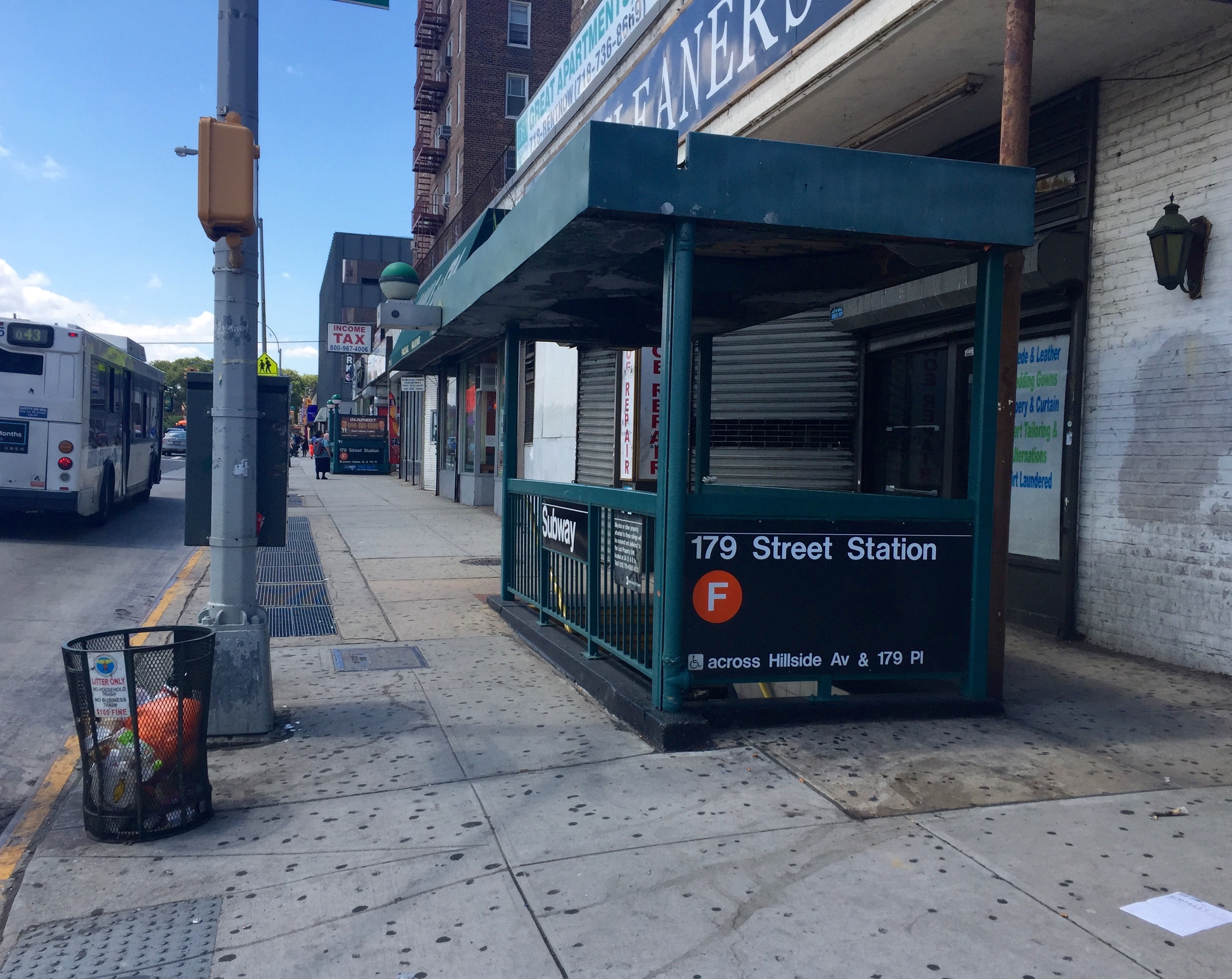
Unusual to the subway system, some of the 16 entrances, like this one at 179th Place, have a canopy over them.

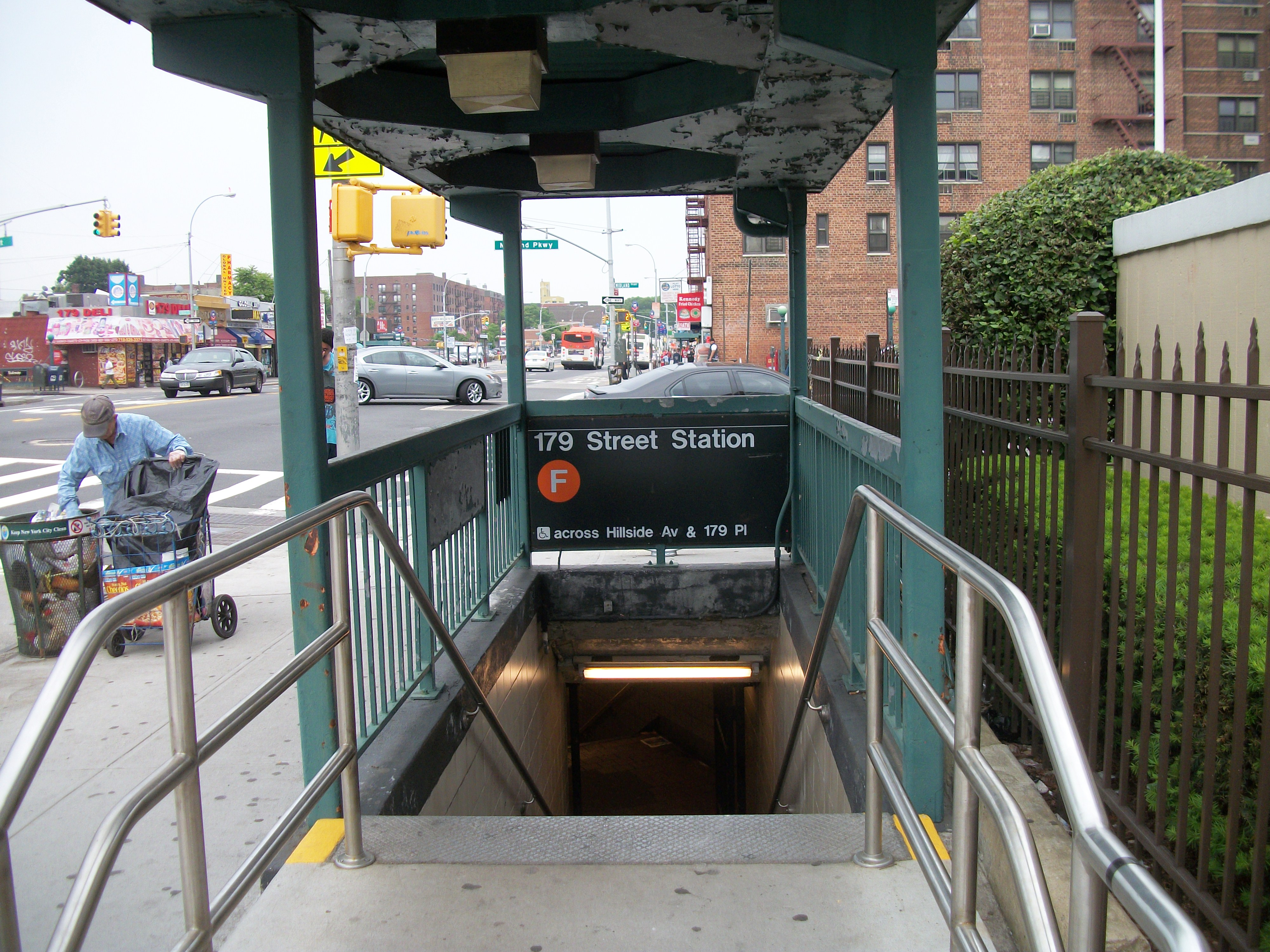
Stairs at Midland Parkway near Jamaica Estates

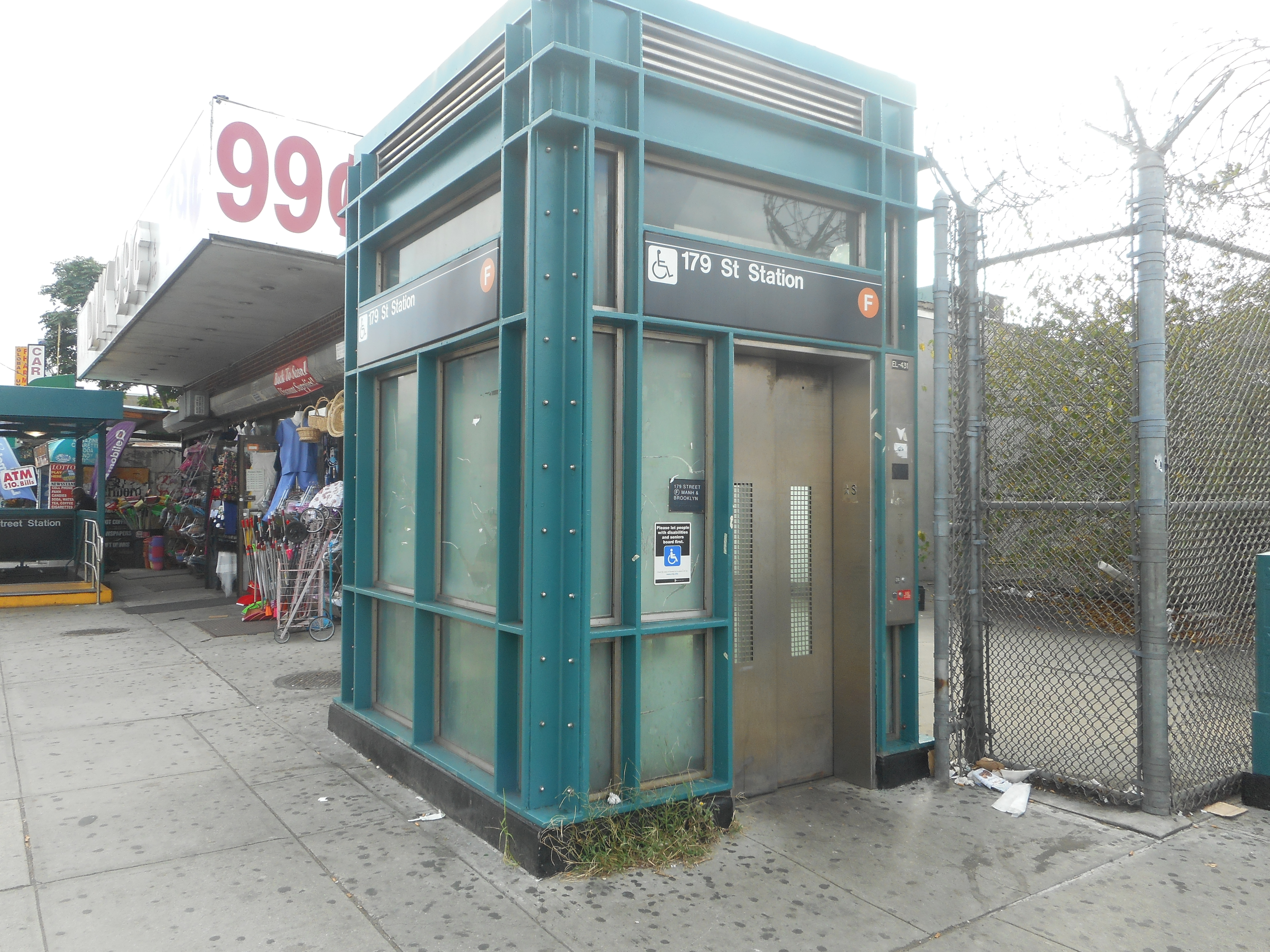
Elevator at 179th Place

The station has a total of 15 staircase entrances and 1 elevator entrance. There are seven full-time entrances at four locations (consisting of six stairs and one elevator), which are indicated in green, and nine other part-time entrances, which are indicated in red.

Exit location	Exit type	Number of exits
NE corner of Hillside Avenue and 178th Street	Staircase	1
SE corner of Hillside Avenue and 178th Street	Staircase	1
North side of Hillside Avenue and 179th Street	Staircase	2
SW corner of Hillside Avenue and 179th Street	Staircase	1
SE corner of Hillside Avenue and 179th Street	Staircase	1
NE corner of Hillside Avenue and 179th Place	Staircase	2
SE corner of Hillside Avenue and 179th Place	Staircase	3
SE corner of Hillside Avenue and 179th Place	Elevator	1
SW corner of Hillside Avenue and 180th Street	Staircase	1
NW corner of Hillside Avenue and Midland Parkway	Staircase	1
NE corner of Hillside Avenue and Midland Parkway	Staircase	1
SW corner of Hillside Avenue and 181st Street	Staircase	1

=== Nearby points of interest ===
The childhood home of president Donald Trump, located at 85-15 Wareham Place, is a few blocks away from the Midland Parkway entrance to the station. Trump's father Fred Trump built the house a year after the station opened, in 1951.

A mosaic sign within one of the station's exits points to the "Monastery and Retreat House". This refers to the Passionist Monastery of the Immaculate Conception and Thomas Berry Retreat House, located along a 12-acre (4.9 ha) complex one block north of the station.
