= Kissena Boulevard =

Boulevard in Queens, New York

Kissena Blvd
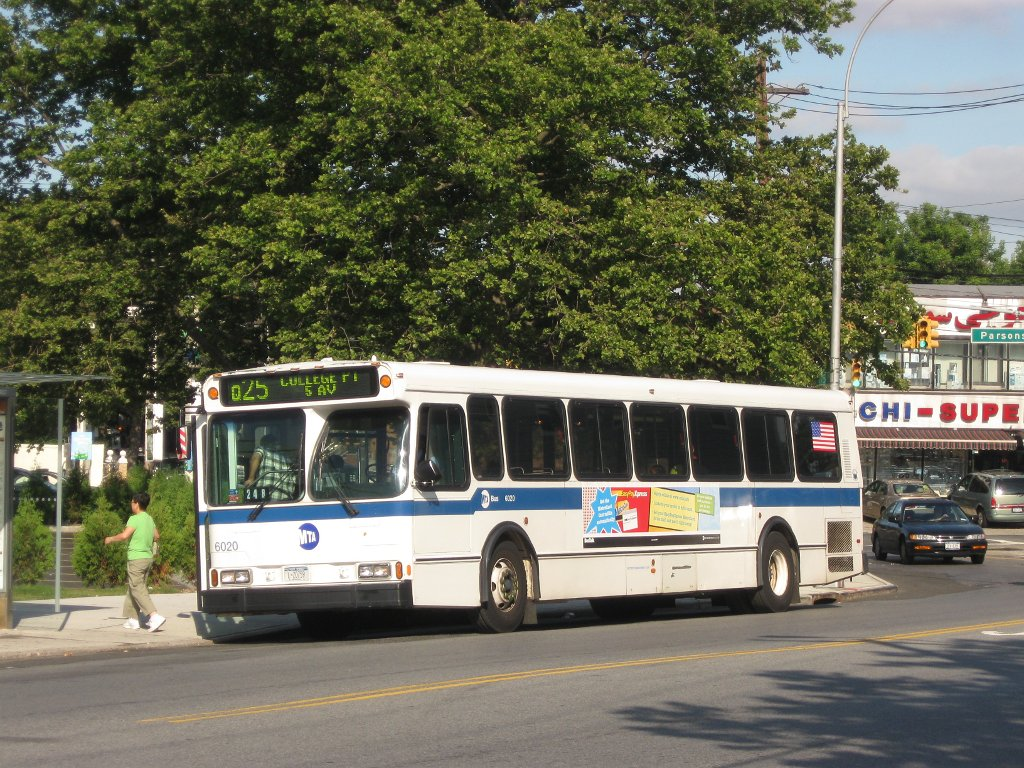
- An MTA Bus Company (ex-MTA NYCT) 1999 Orion 05.501 bus in service on the Q25 route traveling northbound on Kissena Boulevard in Kew Gardens Hills in July 2009
- Owner: City of New York
- Maintained by: NYCDOT
- Length: 2.7 mi (4.3 km)
- Location: Queens, New York City
- South end: Parsons Boulevard / 75th Avenue in Kew Gardens Hills
- Major junctions: I-495 (Long Island Expressway) in Kew Gardens Hills
- North end: Main Street in Flushing

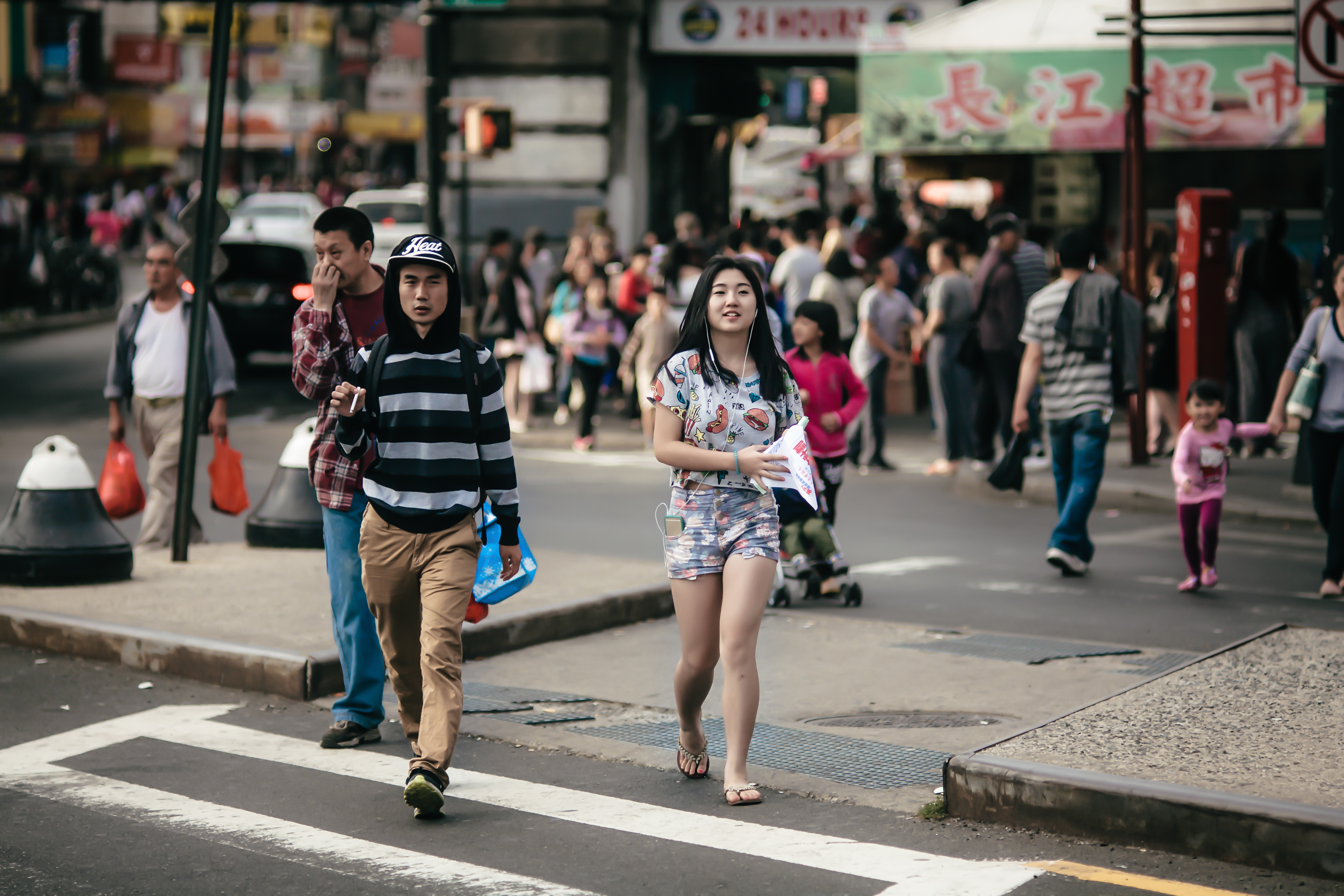
Intersection of Kissena Boulevard and Main Street in Flushing Chinatown, 2015.

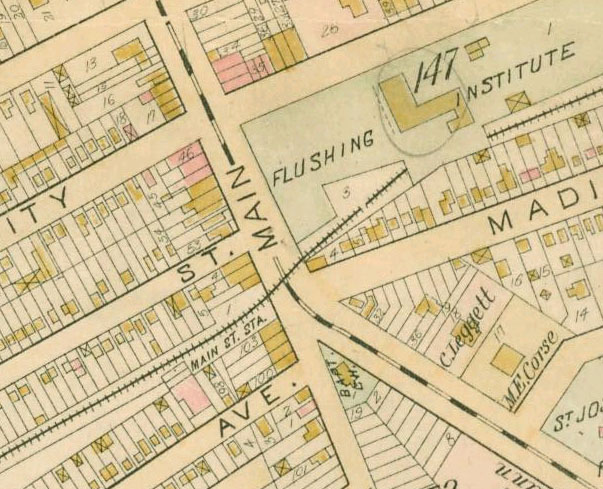
Intersection of Kissena Boulevard and Main Street in 1891.

Kissena Boulevard is a thoroughfare spanning the Flushing and Pomonok neighborhoods of the borough of Queens in New York City, extending from Main Street in the Flushing Chinatown to Parsons Boulevard in Kew Gardens Hills. The road's name is derived from Kissena Lake, a name given by 19th century horticulturist Samuel Bowne Parsons for the Chippewa word meaning, "it is cold". The lake is located in Kissena Park.

The road is one of the oldest in Queens, a 4-mile path connecting the colonial settlements of Flushing and Jamaica, known originally as the "Road to Jamaica" and later Jamaica Avenue. After Queens was consolidated into the City of New York in 1898, the undeveloped sections of the borough were subdivided into a street grid. The section of the Road to Jamaica below 75th Avenue was absorbed into Parsons Boulevard and much of the north-south traffic between Flushing and Jamaica was taken by newly created Main Street. Kissena Boulevard serves as a diagonal route connecting Main Street with Parsons Boulevard. The boulevard is only 2 lanes wide for the majority of its run, but becomes 4 lanes wide with a median divider between the Long Island Expressway (LIE) and 71st Avenue. Additionally, Queens College borders the boulevard to the west, south of the LIE. A branch of the Queens Library is also on Kissena Boulevard. In the 2020s, Downtown Flushing is undergoing rapid gentrification by Chinese transnational entities.

== Transportation ==
Kissena Boulevard is covered by the following:

- The MTA Bus Company's Q25 bus serves the entire length of the boulevard.
- The Q17, Q26, Q27, Q65, and Nassau-bound N20G and N20X buses all run on the boulevard between its northern end at Main Street and Sanford Avenue to the south. The Q17 also continues further south to Horace Harding Expressway.
- The Flushing–Main Street station of the Long Island Rail Road's Port Washington Branch is at the boulevard's northern end.
