= Q27 (New York City bus) =

Bus route in Queens, New York

q27 rush
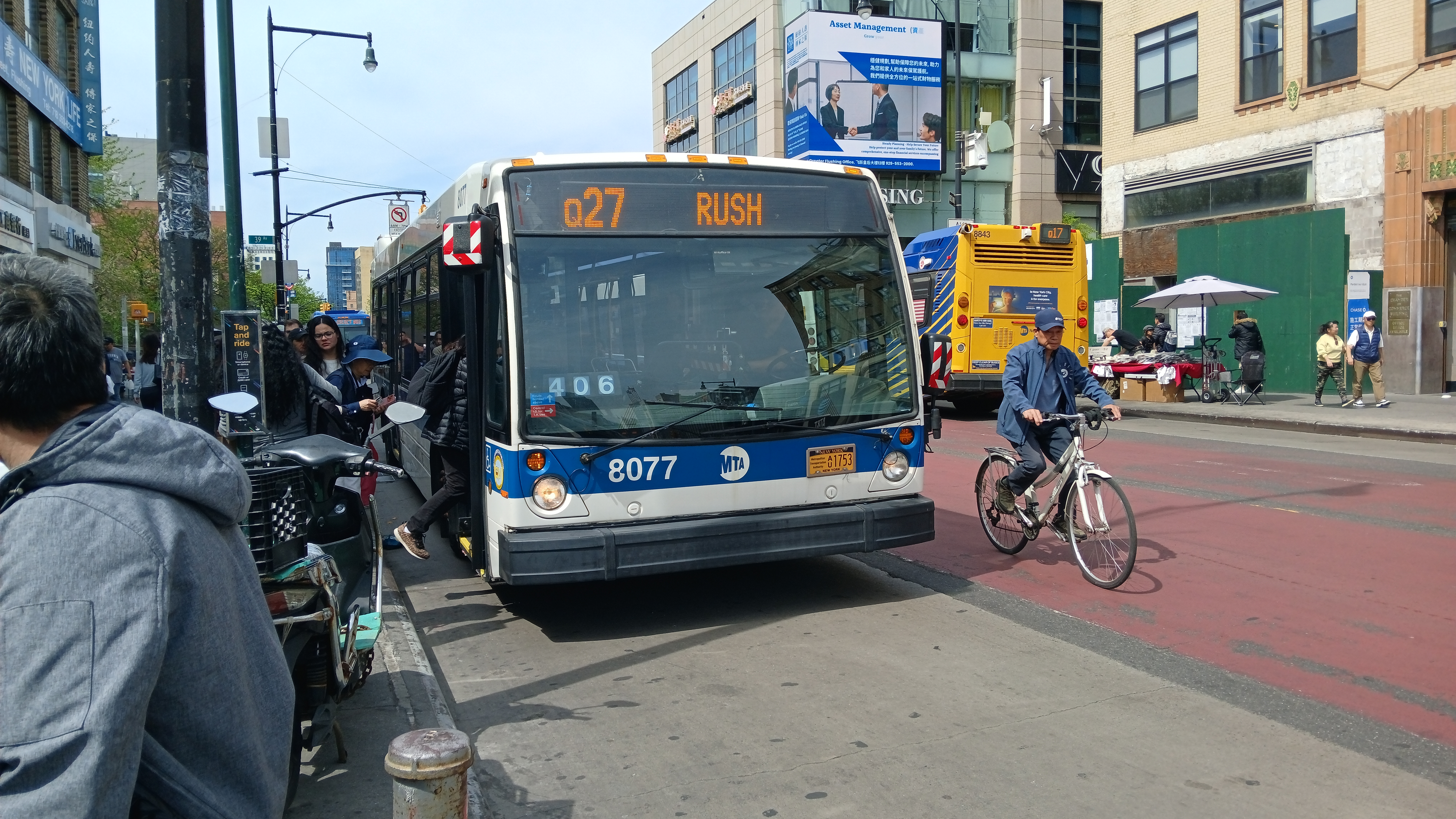
- A 2011 Nova Bus LFS (8077) on the Cambria Heights-bound Q27 Rush at Main Street/39th Ave

Overview
- System: MTA Regional Bus Operations
- Operator: New York City Transit Authority
- Garage: Queens Village Depot
- Vehicle: Nova Bus LFS
- Began service: 1926; 2001 (Q27 limited-stop service)

Route
- Locale: Queens, New York, U.S.
- Communities served: Flushing, Auburndale, Bayside, Oakland Gardens, Hollis Hills, Queens Village, Cambria Heights
- Landmarks served: Flushing Hospital Medical Center, Flushing Cemetery, Queensborough Community College, Alley Pond Park
- Start: Flushing – Main Street & 39th Avenue / Flushing–Main Street station
- Via: 46th Avenue, 47th Avenue, Rocky Hill Road, 48th Avenue, Springfield Boulevard
- End: Cambria Heights – Francis Lewis Boulevard & 120th Avenue
- Length: 9.5 miles (15.3 km)
- Other routes: Q26 46th Avenue/College Point Boulevard

Service
- Operates: 24 hours
- Annual patronage: 4,890,183 (2025)
- Transfers: Yes
- Timetable: Q27

The Q27 bus route constitutes a public transit line in Queens, New York City, running primarily along 46th Avenue, Rocky Hill Road and Springfield Boulevard between a major bus-subway hub in Flushing and Cambria Heights. The route is operated by MTA Regional Bus Operations under the New York City Transit brand.

Service on the route that became the Q27 started in October 1928. Operated by the North Shore Bus Company until 1947, it originally went from Flushing to the Rosewood section of Bayside. Buses were extended to Queens Village in 1950, then to Merrick Boulevard in 1956; a further extension to 233rd Street in 1957 was short-lived. Rush hour peak-direction limited-stop service along the Q27 route was introduced in September 2001, and the route was extended from Queens Village to Cambria Heights in 2004 to replace Q83 service on Springfield Boulevard. Service on Kissena Boulevard and Holly Avenue was discontinued on June 29, 2025, and replaced with additional service on Parsons Boulevard and Sanford Avenue.

== Route description and service ==
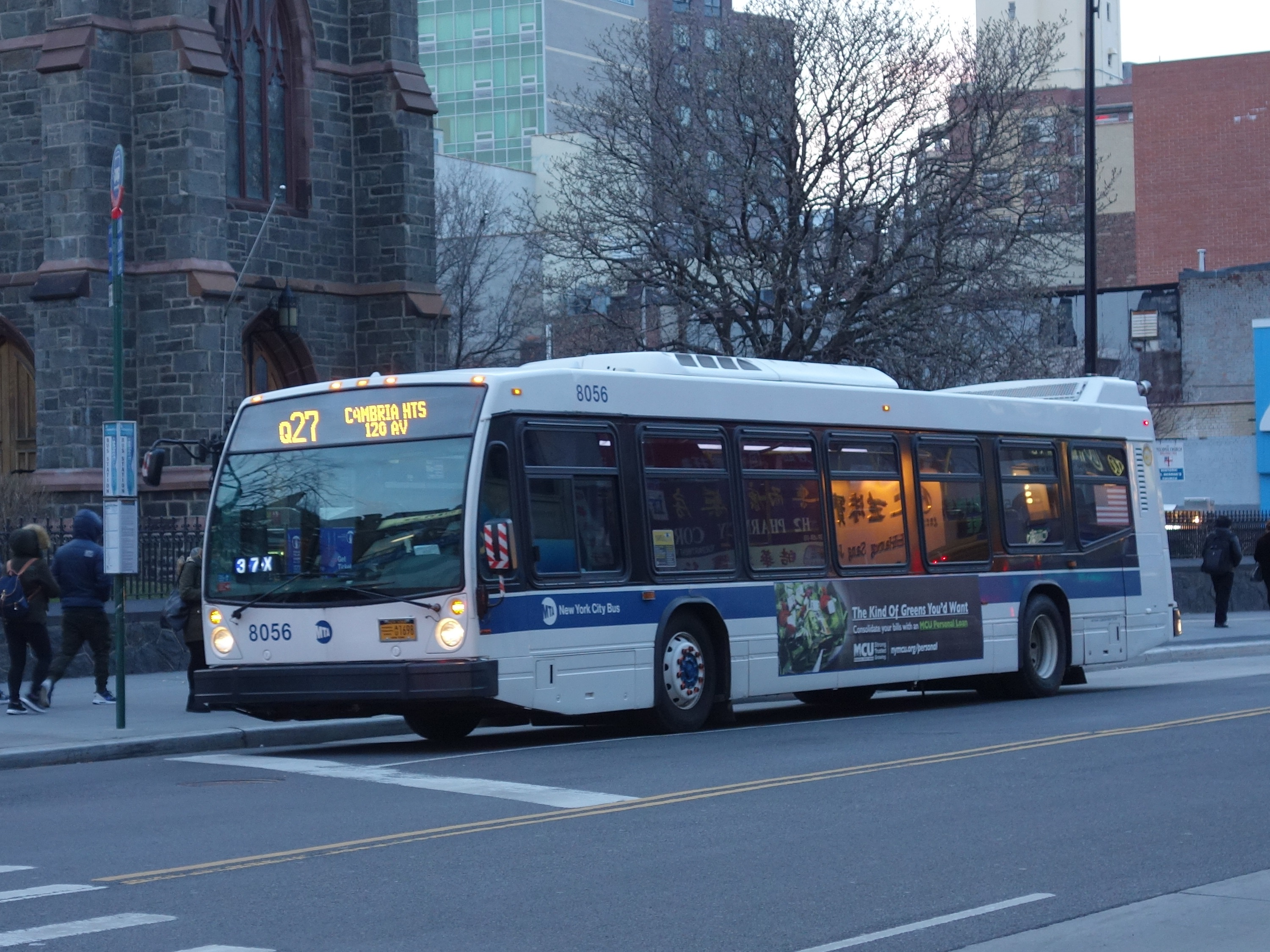
A 2011 Nova Bus LFS (8056) on the Cambria Heights-bound Q27 at Main Street/39th Avenue

The Q27 begins at the New York City Subway's Flushing–Main Street station at Main Street and 39th Avenue. Service heads south via Main Street and then via Kissena Boulevard until Sanford Avenue, where it turns east. It then turns to Parsons Boulevard to continue southeast as the street becomes 46th Avenue and Hollis Court Boulevard at Utopia Parkway. Service then diverges onto 47th Avenue until just east of Francis Lewis Boulevard, where buses continue onto Rocky Hill Road. After the Clearview Expressway Service Road, Rocky Hill Road becomes 48th Avenue. Buses turn south at 216th Street and continue until Luke Place. Buses then turn onto Luke Place and continue east via 56th Avenue. On weekdays between 7 a.m. and 11 p.m., buses continue via 56th Avenue and loop into Queensborough Community College before returning west via 56th Avenue and onto Springfield Boulevard. At other times, buses directly turn south onto Springfield Boulevard. Buses continue along Springfield Boulevard, heading south on Francis Lewis Boulevard, to the terminal at Francis Lewis Boulevard and 120th Avenue. Northbound buses head south along Francis Lewis Boulevard, turn right on 121st Avenue, turn right onto Springfield Blvd and follow the same route as southbound service until 39th Avenue and Main Street. Buses then head west along 39th Avenue, north on Prince Street, and east on 38th Avenue to the terminal at Main Street. Buses, out of service, turn south along Main Street to start southbound service.

In addition, there are a few supplemental bus service variants that operate on school days. Between 1 p.m. and 3 p.m., additional service runs from a terminal at 58th Avenue and Springfield Boulevard to the Q27's two terminals in Flushing and Cambria Heights. Between 2:00 p.m. and 2:30 p.m., some trips originate at Hillside Avenue and 231st Street, run west via Hillside Avenue to Springfield Boulevard, and continue to the Q27's southern terminal. In addition, three Q27 buses operate from Corporal Kennedy Street and 33rd Avenue, make a few stops along Bell Boulevard before proceeding along its original southbound route, between 2 p.m and 4 p.m and continue to the route's southern terminal.

The Q27 makes limited stops along 46th Avenue with local service being provided by the Q26. Local stops are served overnight.

=== School trippers ===
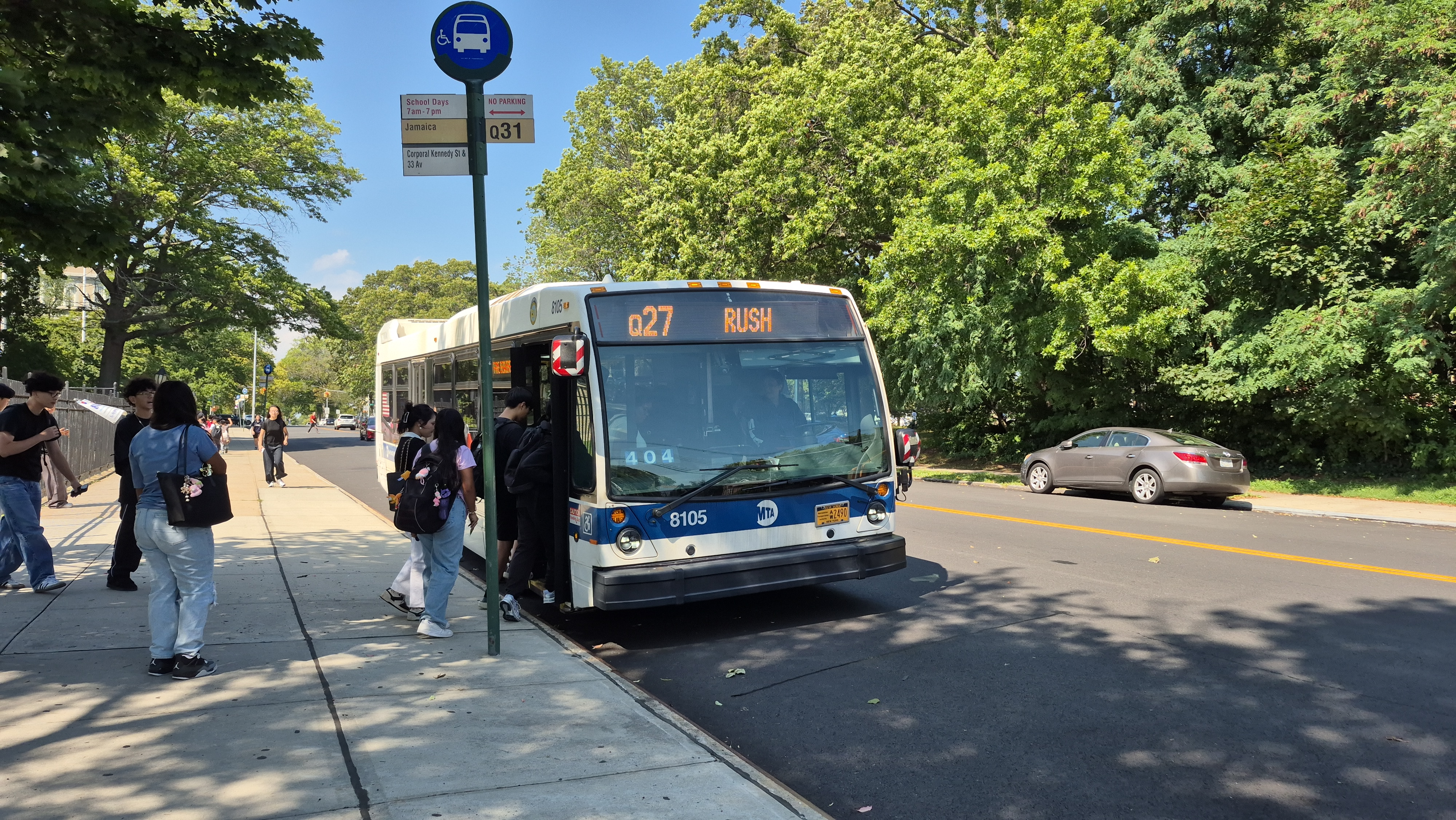
2015 Nova LFS 8105 on the Q27 boarding at Bayside High School in September 2025.

When school is in session, ten buses depart from 58th Avenue/Springfield Boulevard outside Benjamin N. Cardozo High School between 1pm and 2:33pm, with trips splitting evenly between Flushing and Cambria Heights. All former trips make the same “rush” stops as regular service. The latter trips don't begin until 1:40pm.

Three buses depart Bayside High School for Cambria Heights at 2:26, 3:10, and 3:55pm, respectively. All three head to 48th Avenue via Corporal Kennedy Street and 35th Avenue, and make two extra stops on Bell Boulevard before going south on its normal route.

Four more buses to Cambria Heights originate at Queensborough Community College during P.M. hours, with the first leaving at 1pm. Another two depart Martin Van Buren High School for Cambria Heights at 2:25 and 2:28pm, respectively, heading to Springfield Boulevard via Hillside Avenue. One more bus to Cambria Heights originates at Francis Lewis Boulevard at 2:25.

== History ==
=== Start of service ===
Service on the route that became the Q27 was started in October 1928 by the Z & M Coach Company to connect the subway in Flushing, at Main Street and Amity Street, to the Rosewood section of Bayside. The owner of the company, Fred M. Zander, was fined $25 twice in November for operating the route without a license. He continued operating the service despite the order to stop service until he obtained a permit for it. Rosewood residents banded together to raise money and hire the bus like a taxi to allow service to continue. The bus route was supported by the Rosewood Improvement Association and the East Flushing Civic Association. The route originally operated between Flushing and the Horace Harding Expressway, and was known as the Flushing–Rosewood route.

In 1931, the New York City Board of Estimate was deciding which bus route franchises would be given to which private operators. Along with thirty other bus routes, the Q27 was tentatively assigned to the North Shore Bus Company as part of Zone B, one of four bus zones in the borough, which covered Flushing and northern Queens. Z & M obtained a one-year franchise to the route on December 30, 1932. On May 2, 1933, the New York State Transit Commission granted the company a certificate of public convenience and necessity for the route for the duration of the franchise. The New York City government granted the company another franchise for the route on April 26, 1935, for a period beginning at the end of the first contract, and ending no later than December 31, 1938. At public hearings at the Transit Commission to obtain certification for the franchise, it was found that Z & M operated the Q26 route at a fare greater than provided for in the franchise contract. The hearings closed on June 18, and the Transit Commission gave Z & M an opportunity to revise the franchise with New York City. On October 4, 1935, the Board of Estimate adopted a resolution giving the company a 90-day extension from October 23 to get the franchise certified. On January 29, 1936, the Transit Commission declined to certify the route as the extension expired.

On November 9, 1936, the operation of the route was transferred to the North Shore Bus Company. On March 30, 1947, North Shore Bus was taken over by the New York City Board of Transportation (later the New York City Transit Authority), and since it could not operate on the mandated five-cent fare and went bankrupt, its former routes were turned over to city operation.

=== Service extensions ===
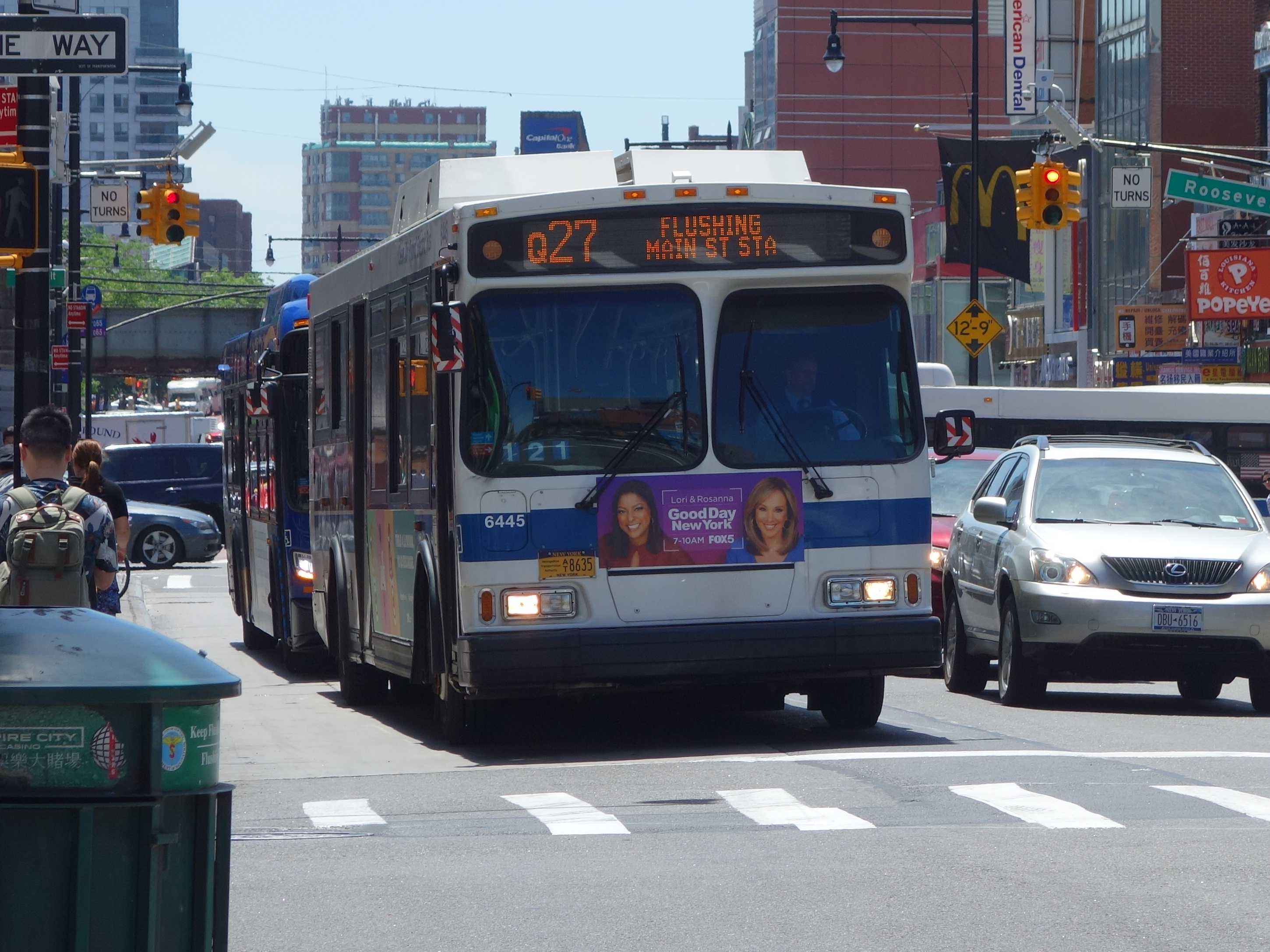
A 2004 Orion VII OG HEV (6445) on the Flushing-bound Q27 turning onto 39th Avenue from Main Street in May 2019

Alternate buses were extended south along Springfield Boulevard to Queens Village station of the Long Island Rail Road on April 30, 1950. This change had been approved by the New York City Board of Estimate on April 4.

On October 30, 1951, the Oakland Terrace Civic Association requested that the NYCBOT extend the Q27 to Little Neck via Horace Harding Boulevard to serve newly developed areas. The Q27 ran from Main Street and Roosevelt Avenue, via Kissena Boulevard, Holly Avenue, 46th Avenue, 47th Avenue, 48th Avenue, 216th Street and Springfield Boulevard to Queens Village station. The extension, which was supported by the transit committee of the Flushing Chambers of Commerce, would have been made either as a shuttle route, or through the diversion of some Q27 trips.

On January 22, 1957, service was extended on a 90-day trial basis by 2 miles (3.2 km) from the Queens Village LIRR station to the intersection of Springfield Boulevard and Merrick Boulevard, as part of a series of citywide bus changes. The change was approved by the New York City Transit Authority (NYCTA) on November 29, 1956. On June 30, 1957, service was extended on a 60-day trial basis by 1.5 miles (2.4 km) from Springfield Boulevard and Merrick Boulevard to Merrick Boulevard and 233rd Street. The extension was made to encourage more people to use the bus route. Ridership on the temporary extension to Springfield Boulevard and Merrick Boulevard was low, with revenues averaging 23 cents per mile, lower than the 80 cents per mile needed to break even. On August 26, 1957, the NYCTA announced that service would resume terminating at Springfield Boulevard and Merrick Boulevard on September 8, since it was losing $120 a day on the extension to 233rd Street.

=== Changes in the 1980s ===
On September 26, 1982, wheelchair-accessible buses began operating on the Q27 and seventeen other city bus routes. Between 1980 and 1985, buses were rerouted off Parsons Boulevard between 46th Avenue and Kissena Boulevard, the path it shared with the Q26, onto Holly Avenue and Kissena Boulevard.

=== Introduction of limited-stop service ===
A 2019 Nova Bus LFS (8540) on the Q27 heading towards Flushing

Rush hour peak-direction limited-stop service along the Q27 route was introduced in September 2001, to speed up bus service. Service on the route would not be increased, but alternate trips would only make limited stops at major traffic generators between the terminal in Flushing and Springfield Boulevard and Horace Harding Expressway. South of there, all trips would make local stops. Limited-stop service would run to Flushing between 7 a.m. and 9 a.m., and to Queens Village between 5 p.m. and 8:15 p.m. The change was made because 30% of riders used the route to get to the subway in Flushing. Limited service was expected to save riders up to five minutes of travel time. The service change was cost neutral, with the potential to be revenue generating as faster service could potentially attract more riders. An alternate proposal that the New York City Transit Authority considered was only implementing limited service along 46th Avenue, the section of the route shared with the Q26. Q27 buses began serving Queensborough Community College on September 9, 2002; previously, the closest Q27 stop was 0.25 miles (0.40 km) from the campus.

On January 4, 2004, service was extended to 120th Avenue and Springfield Boulevard in Cambria Heights to replace Q83 service on Springfield Boulevard between Murdock Avenue and the Queens Village LIRR station.

Overnight trips were extended from Queens Village to Cambria Heights on January 6, 2013, as part of a series of service enhancements made by New York City Transit. The route's northern terminal was shifted from Main Street and 39th Avenue to 39th Avenue and 138th Street in August 2014.On June 30, 2024, Flushing-bound Q27 buses were rerouted to start at 121st Avenue and Springfield Boulevard.

=== Bus redesign ===
In December 2019, the MTA released a draft redesign of the Queens bus network. As part of the redesign, the 46th/47th/48th Avenue section of the Q27 would have been replaced by an "intra-borough" route called the QT15, which would have run from Queensborough Community College to College Point, taking over part of the Q65 in College Point. The Springfield Boulevard corridor would have been served by a "neighborhood" route called the QT71, running from Bay Terrace to Springfield Gardens. The redesign was delayed due to the COVID-19 pandemic in New York City in 2020, and the original draft plan was dropped due to negative feedback.

A revised plan was released in March 2022. Under the new plan, the Q27 would become a "limited-stop" route and would be extended to College Point, using the existing Q65 route. Starting at 110th Street and 14th Avenue, the Q27 would travel on College Point Boulevard, Northern Boulevard, Main Street, and Kissena Boulevard. Within Flushing, the Q27 would then be rerouted onto Sanford Avenue and Parsons Boulevard before continuing along its existing route on 46th Avenue. The Q27's southern terminus would be truncated to Oakland Gardens, with the remaining section on Springfield Boulevard being served by the Q26. A new "local" route, the Q78, would also run on Springfield Boulevard, connecting Bay Terrace to the north with John F. Kennedy International Airport to the south. The Q78 would use Springfield Boulevard for most of its route, except north of 48th Avenue, where it would use Bell Boulevard.

A final bus-redesign plan was released in December 2023. The Q27 would retain its existing route from Flushing to Cambria Heights, but slightly truncated from 120th Avenue to Linden Boulevard, and would become a rush route, making few stops west of Utopia Parkway. In addition, the route would be modified to run along Parsons Boulevard and Sanford Avenue in Flushing, avoiding narrow streets. The limited-stop service would be eliminated due to the rush route conversion.

On December 17, 2024, addendums to the final plan were released. Among these, stop changes were made and deadheads on 121st Avenue were retained. On January 29, 2025, the current plan was approved by the MTA Board, and the Queens Bus Redesign went into effect in two different phases during Summer 2025. The Q27 is part of Phase I, which started on June 29, 2025.

== See also ==
- List of bus routes in Queens
- Q17 (New York City bus)
- Q26 (New York City bus)
