= Q25 (New York City bus) =

Bus route in Queens, New York

q25
- College Point – Jamaica
- A 2012 New Flyer C40LF (336) on the Jamaica-bound Q25 in Flushing, Queens making a turn onto Main Street.

Overview
- System: MTA Regional Bus Operations
- Operator: MTA Bus Company
- Garage: College Point Depot
- Vehicle: New Flyer C40LF CNG
- Began service: 1928
- Ended service: 2025 (Q34)

Route
- Locale: Queens, New York, U.S.
- Communities served: College Point, Linden Hill, Flushing, Queensboro Hill, Pomonok, Kew Gardens Hills, Hillcrest, Briarwood, Jamaica
- Start: College Point, Queens – Poppenhusen Avenue and 119th Street
- Via: 127th Street, Kissena Boulevard, Parsons Boulevard
- End: Jamaica, Queens – Sutphin Boulevard and 94th Avenue, Jamaica station
- Length: 8.4 miles (13.5 km)
- Other routes: Q17 Kissena Blvd/Horace Harding Expwy/188th Street; Q65 164th Street

Service
- Operates: 24 hours
- Annual patronage: 5,606,717 (2025)
- Transfers: Yes
- Timetable: Q25

The Q25 bus route constitutes a public transit line in Queens, New York City. The south-to-north route runs primarily on Parsons Boulevard and Kissena Boulevard, serving two major bus-subway hubs: Sutphin Boulevard–Archer Avenue–Jamaica and Flushing–Main Street. It terminates in College Point in northern Queens.

The Q25 was originally operated by Queens-Nassau Transit Lines, Queens Transit Corporation, and Queens Surface Corporation from the 1930s to 2005; it is now operated by MTA Regional Bus Operations under the MTA Bus Company brand. Until 2025, the Q34 bus paralleled the Q25 south of Linden Place; the Q25 and Q34 were numbered as a single route in 1937 and were split into separate routes in the 1990s. Q25 limited-stop service was introduced in 2007. The Q25 Limited and Q34 were discontinued as part of the Queens bus network redesign in 2025.

== Route description and service ==
The northern terminal is at Poppenhusen Avenue and 119th Street in College Point. The bus then travels east and south via 127th Street, Ulmer Place, and Linden Place. It then turns west onto Northern Boulevard, and then south onto Main Street in Downtown Flushing (which hosts Flushing Chinatown). The route passes the Flushing–Main Street terminal of the IRT Flushing Line (7 and <7> trains), where over a dozen bus lines terminate. The LIRR Port Washington Branch also stops here, at the Flushing–Main Street station. It then turns southeast onto Kissena Boulevard, running the entire distance of the street between Main Street and Parsons Boulevard, and then turns south via Parsons Boulevard. The route proceeds south to Jamaica Avenue, then west to Sutphin Boulevard, terminating at Sutphin Boulevard and 94th Avenue underneath the Jamaica station for the LIRR and AirTrain JFK. This terminal is shared with the parallel Q65 route, which serves 164th Street. Until 2025, limited-stop service was provided between Flushing and Jamaica.

Also until 2025, the Q34 bus paralleled the Q25 south of Linden Place. It began at the intersection of Willets Point Boulevard and 149th Street in Whitestone, and continued down Willets Point Boulevard when it merged onto Union Street, where it briefly shared 1 stop with the Q44 SBS and 2 stops with the Q20A/Q20B. It would then turn on various local streets, serving the Mitchell-Gardens and the Linden Towers apartment complexes before merging with the Q25 at Linden Place.

The average daily ridership for the Q25 on weekdays in 2014 was 19,567, the ridership on Saturday was 13,359 and the ridership on Sunday was 10,225.

== History ==
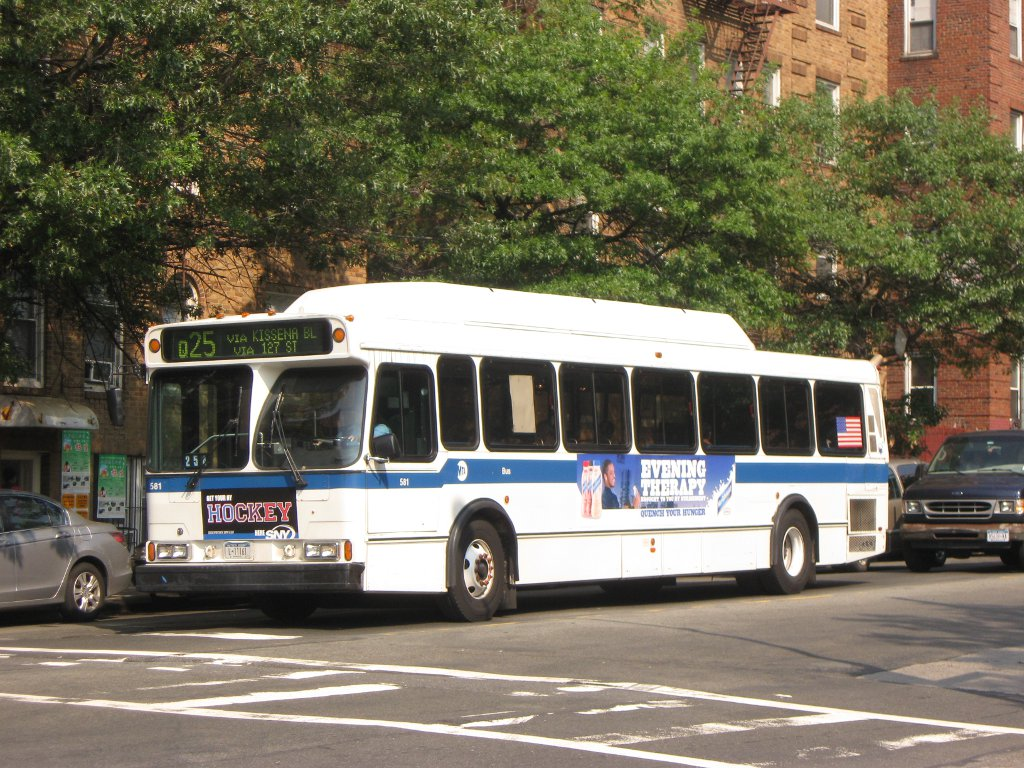
A 1995 Orion V CNG (581) on the College Point-bound Q25

=== Early operation ===
Q25 service began in 1928, under the operation of the Flushing Heights Bus Company. This route was formally known as Route Q-25, Flushing-Jamaica via Parsons Boulevard Line. On May 25, 1933, Queens–Nassau Transit received a one-year franchise for route "Q-34" from Flushing to College Point. The route began service in April 1933.

In 1931, the Board of Estimate was deciding which bus route franchises would be given to which operators. Along with thirty other bus routes, the Q25 was tentatively assigned to the North Shore Bus Company. On April 20, 1933, the New York State Transit Commission (NYSTC) granted the Flushing Heights Bus Company a certificate of convenience and necessity for operation of a Flushing-Hillcrest route via Parsons Boulevard. While the company had sought a route between Flushing and Jamaica, it was restricted on its southern end to 75th Avenue and Parsons Boulevard due to the opposition of the New York and Queens Transit Corporation, which operated a competing trolley route along 164th Street.

The North Shore Bus Company acquired the franchises to the Flushing Heights Bus Corporation routes on September 22, 1935. North Shore expected to get the franchises for both the Q17 and Q25, which were then operated by Flushing Heights. North Shore was only allowed to keep the Q17 route, and as compensation, the city assured them of a new route between Flushing and Jamaica via Main Street. This route would go into service when a bridge was built to carry Main Street over the Grand Central Parkway; this route is today's Q44. In 1935, the southern terminal of the Q25 was at Parsons Boulevard and 75th Avenue. The Flushing–Hillcrest Civic Association called for the route to be extended to Jamaica Avenue.

The original Q25 terminus was in Flushing, and the original Q34 was the College Point segment of the Q25. The Q25 was combined with the then-Q34 route into College Point, and the Q34 was later rerouted to its current alignment in Whitestone and then extended along the Q25 route. On July 16, 1937, Queens–Nassau Transit combined the Q25 and the Q34 to become the Q25-34 operating from College Point to Jamaica. At this point, buses used the Q25/34 designation. Toward College Point, the buses would use the sign Q25/34, and toward Jamaica the signs would use Q34/25. The Roosevelt Avenue short-turns would use Q25, while the through buses to College Point would use Q34.

In 1940, Queens-Nassau Transit applied to the NYSTC for permission to modify its franchise for the Q25 so it could make a slight adjustment to its route. The adjustment would reroute most Q25 buses to stay on Parsons Boulevard. This would eliminate the detour in Hillcrest of buses turning off of Parsons Boulevard at Goethals Avenue, then moving onto 164th Street, and then finally onto the Grand Central Parkway service road before moving back onto Parsons Boulevard. This change was to be made to provide transportation to the new Triboro Hospital for Tuberculosis. The NYSTC approved the request on July 16, 1940, but the change did not yet take effect since the hospital was not yet open.

On March 12, 1945, the New York State Public Service Commission granted Queens-Nassau Transit Lines permission to discontinue a section of the Q25 along 88th Avenue between 153rd Street and the old trolley right-of-way. The Linden Towers branch of the Q34 (also designated Q25-Q34) started in 1961 to 139th Street and 28th Road. In 1970, it was extended to 149th Street and Willets Point Blvd. In the early 1990s, the Q25/34 was split into the Q25 and the Q34, easing the confusion of the riders.

The southern terminus for the Q25 and Q34 moved from 160th Street and Jamaica Avenue to Parsons Boulevard and Jamaica Avenue in 2004.

=== MTA takeover ===
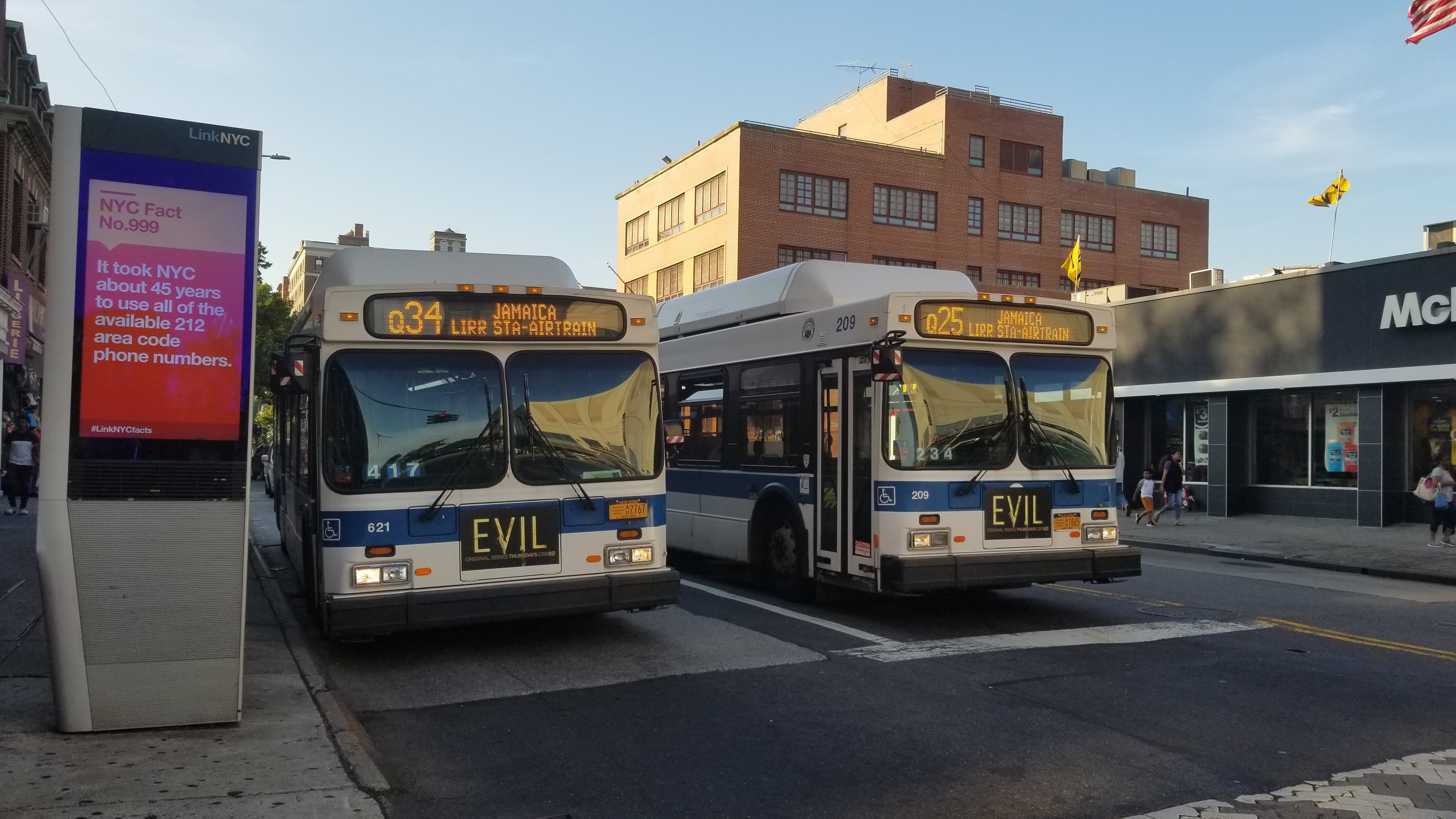
Two C40LFs: one 2012 (621) on the Q34 and one 2011 (209) on the Q25, both in Jamaica

On February 27, 2005, the MTA Bus Company took over the operations of the Queens Surface routes, part of the city's takeover of all the remaining privately operated bus routes. Under the MTA, the Q25, Q34, and Q65 were extended from Jamaica Avenue to the Jamaica LIRR station on Sutphin Boulevard in April 2006.

On July 9, 2007, Q25 limited-stop service was introduced, skipping stops between Flushing-Main Street and Jamaica during rush hours. In 2009, the northbound stop of the Q34 was relocated form eastbound Willets Point Boulevard at 149th Street to a location nearby on eastbound 25th Avenue at 149th Street where curb space was available. This was done in response to community requests to address buses that were double parking during their recovery times. The turnaround path was changed to utilize 25th Avenue to northbound 150th Street to westbound Willets Point Boulevard.

In 2014, the Parsons/Kissena corridor along with the Main Street corridor and 164th Street corridor were evaluated for a potential Select Bus Service (SBS) route between Flushing and Jamaica. The Q65 Limited (164th Street) was not selected for conversion; the Q25 Limited and Q44 Limited (Main Street) underwent further studies in 2015. The Q44 became the Q44 SBS on November 29, 2015. It was originally expected that the Q25 Limited would be implemented as an SBS service in 2017. However, implementation was later delayed, and the MTA announced in late 2017 that a Flushing-to-Jamaica SBS route, roughly along the Q25 and Q34 corridor, would be implemented within the next ten years.

In September 2016, in response to community requests, the Q34's Whitestone terminus was slightly revised and the turnaround travel path of the bus was revised to avoid a residential street. The northbound travel path of the Q34 now travels east onto 31st Road and continue northbound on 139th Street to return to 28th Road instead of going on 138th Street and the Whitestone Expressway service road. One lightly used bus stop at 137th Street and 29th Road in Flushing was discontinued. Annual operating costs would decrease by $12,700. The community requested that the Q34 be removed from 25th Avenue, which abuts Leonardo Ingravallo Playground and the Memorial Field of Flushing ballfields to the south, and residential homes to the north. The Q34's last northbound stop and its layover was relocated to Willets Point Boulevard at 149th Street, and the turnaround was restored to its pre-2009 routing, running via Willets Point Boulevard, turning right on 24th Road, and turning left around a traffic island to westbound Willets Point Boulevard. The last northbound stop was relocated within the same intersection, and the turnaround path was reduced by approximately 1,000 feet.

==== Bus redesign ====
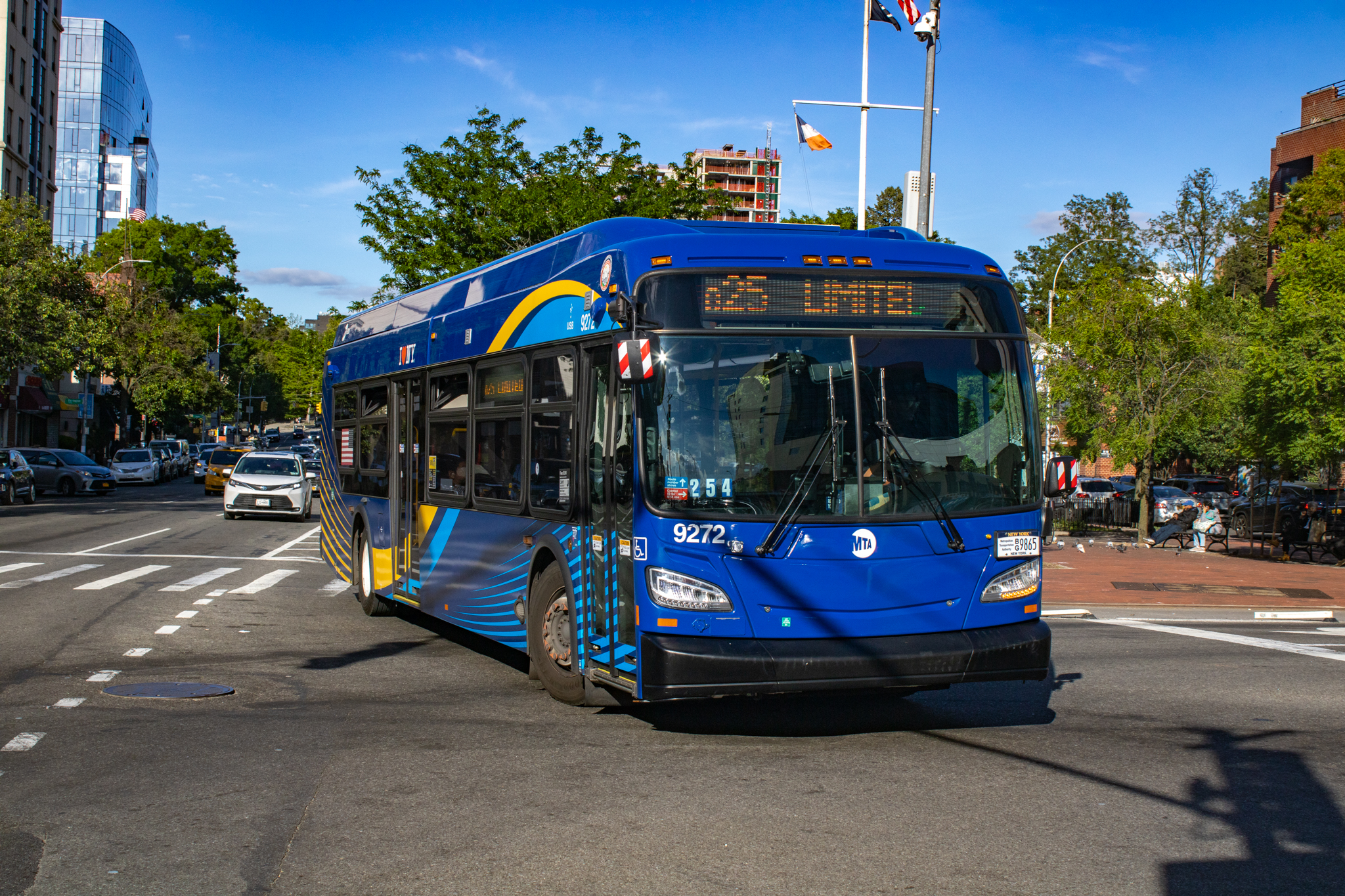
A 2023-2024 XD40 (9272) on the Q25 Limited in Flushing, one month before the Queens Bus Redesign

In December 2019, the MTA released a draft redesign of the Queens bus network. As part of the redesign, the Q25 and Q34 buses would have been replaced by an "intra-borough" route, the QT16. The route would have traveled between Cross Island Parkway and Clintonville Street in Beechhurst, Queens, to the north and Downtown Jamaica to the south, using Union Street and Kissena and Parsons Boulevards. The redesign was delayed due to the COVID-19 pandemic in New York City in 2020, and the original draft plan was dropped due to negative feedback.

A revised plan was released in March 2022. As part of the new plan, the Q34 would be eliminated. The Q25's northern end would have been truncated to Linden Place in Whitestone; service to College Point would have been replaced by an extension of the Q17 bus. The Q25 would have also been extended south along Merrick Boulevard to the intersection with Springfield Boulevard in Springfield Gardens, Queens. The Q25 would have provided local service for the Merrick Boulevard buses, which would run nonstop along Merrick Boulevard.

A final bus-redesign plan was released in December 2023. The Q25 would retain its existing route between College Point and Jamaica, though it would become a limited-stop route with slightly fewer stops than the existing local route. The Q34 would still be eliminated, and frequencies on the Q25 would be increased.

On December 17, 2024, addendums to the final plan were released. Among these, stop changes were made to the Q25. On January 29, 2025, the current plan was approved by the MTA Board, and the Queens Bus Redesign went into effect in two different phases during Summer 2025. The sole Q25 route rebranded from “Limited” to “Local” after the approval, and was assigned to Phase I, which started on June 29, 2025. The Q25 Limited and Q34 ran their last trips on June 27th, 2025, as they were weekday-only routes.

== See also ==
- Queens Surface Corporation
- Q65 (New York City bus)
