= Q65 (New York City bus) =

Bus route in Queens, New York

q65
- Flushing–Jamaica Line
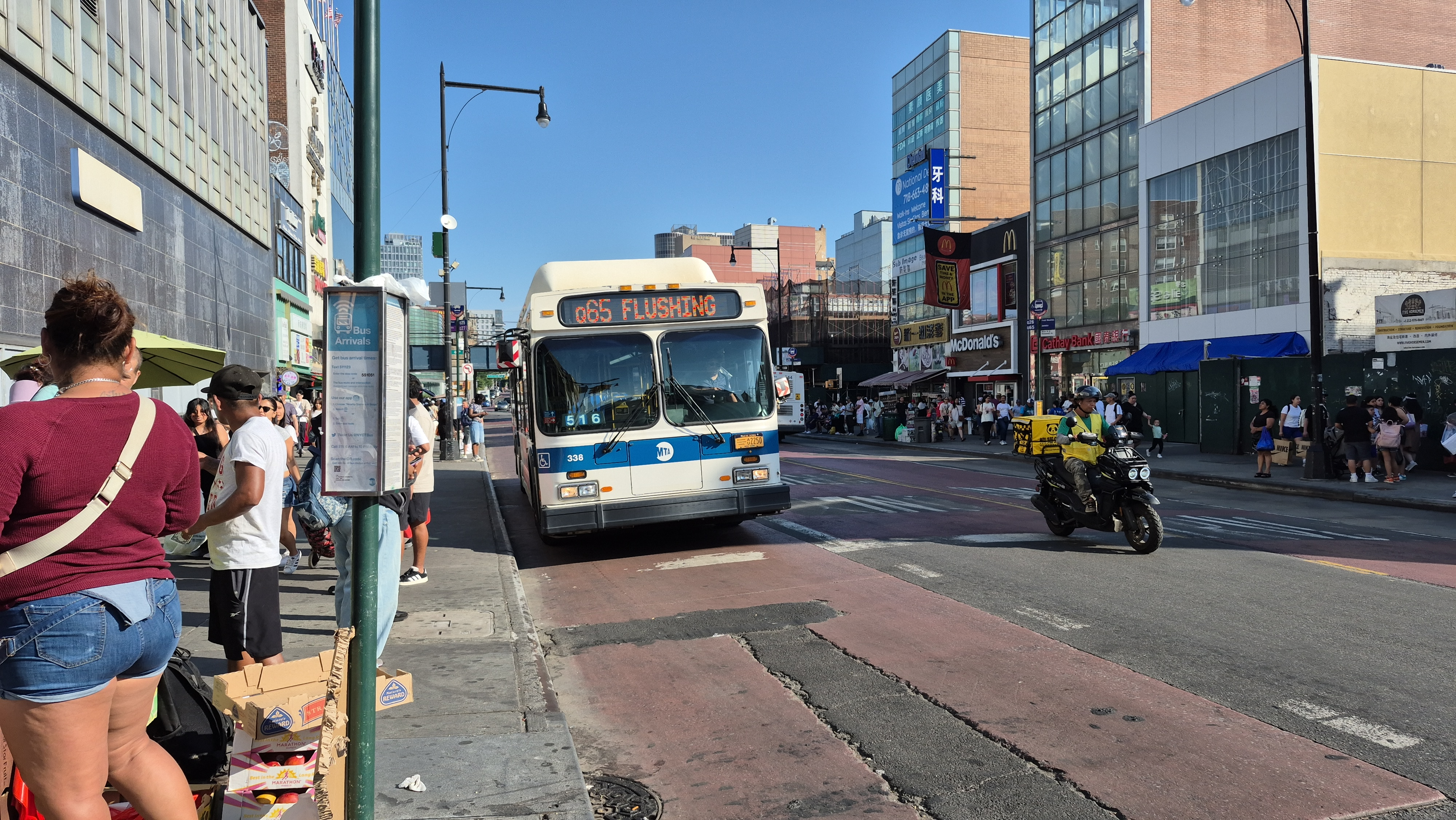
- A 2011-12 New Flyer C40LF (338) on the Q65 terminating at Flushing, Queens.

Overview
- System: MTA Regional Bus Operations
- Operator: MTA Bus Company
- Garage: College Point Depot
- Vehicle: New Flyer C40LF CNG
- Began service: April 7, 1891 (College Point Trolley); December 2, 1899 (Flushing–Jamaica trolley); August 10, 1937 (bus service)

Route
- Locale: Queens, New York, U.S.
- Start: Flushing – Main Street & Roosevelt Avenue / Main Street station
- Via: 164th Street
- End: Jamaica – Sutphin Boulevard / LIRR station
- Length: 5 miles (8.0 km)
- Other routes: Q25 127th St/Kissena Blvd/Parsons Blvd; Q26 College Point Blvd/46th Av/Hollis Court Blvd; Q17 Kissena Boulevard/Horace Harding Expressway/188th Street

Service
- Operates: 24 hours
- Annual patronage: 4,360,645 (2025)
- Transfers: Yes
- Timetable: Q65

The Q65 bus route constitutes a public transit line in Queens, New York City. The south-to-north route runs on 164th Street, operating between two major bus-subway hubs: Sutphin Boulevard–Archer Avenue station in Jamaica and Flushing–Main Street station in Flushing. The route is city-operated under the MTA Bus Company brand of MTA Regional Bus Operations.

The bulk of the bus route between Jamaica and Flushing follows a former streetcar line known as the Flushing–Jamaica Line, Jamaica–Flushing Line, or 164th Street Line, operated by the New York and Queens County Railway from 1899 to 1937. Until 2025, there was an extension of the route following a second line operated by the company called the College Point Line or Flushing–College Point Line, which began operation in 1891. Both lines, combined known as the Jamaica–College Point Line or Jamaica−Flushing−College Point Line, were replaced by bus service in 1937, operated by successor companies Queens-Nassau Transit Lines, Queens Transit Corporation, and finally Queens Surface Corporation until the route was taken over by the city in 2005. On June 29, 2025, the route was shortened to Flushing at its northern end, and service on College Point Boulevard was replaced by the Q26.

== Route description ==
=== Streetcar route ===
==== Flushing–Jamaica Line ====
The original Flushing–Jamaica Line, nicknamed the "Toonerville Express", began at the intersection of Broadway and Lawrence Street (now Northern Boulevard and College Point Boulevard respectively) at the northern edge of Downtown Flushing near Flushing Creek. It ran east to Main Street, then south along Main Street and Jamaica Avenue (now Kissena Boulevard) to Sanford Avenue. It then ran short distances east along Sanford, south along Bowne Avenue (now Bowne Street), east on Forest/Franconia Avenue (45th Avenue), and south on 162nd Street to Pidgeon Meadow Road at the west edge of the Flushing Cemetery. The line proceeded south for five miles along an undeveloped right-of-way owned by the railroad, which would later become 164th Street, to what is now Normal Road, a few blocks north of Hillside Avenue. The line ran short distances west to a point between Parsons Boulevard and 153rd Street, south to 90th Avenue, and west to Washington Street (later 160th Street) ending at Jamaica Avenue in Downtown Jamaica. The line shared a terminal at 160th Street and Jamaica Avenue with the trolley lines of the Long Island Electric Railway, which operated streetcar lines to Far Rockaway, Brooklyn, and Belmont Park. On Sundays, a shuttle service ran to take passengers from Downtown Flushing to Flushing Cemetery.

==== College Point Line ====
The College Point line, consisting of two tracks, began in Flushing at a T-junction on Broadway and Lawrence Street with the Flushing–Jamaica Line and the Corona Line traveling west along Broadway (Northern Boulevard). It ran north along Lawrence Street, the College Point Causeway, and 122nd Street (all part of the modern College Point Boulevard) to 14th Road (northbound) or 15th Avenue (southbound). It then ran west to 110th Street and 14th Avenue at the edge of the East River. The line served the College Point Ferry or 99th Street Ferry, which ran to East 99th Street on the Upper East Side of Manhattan.

=== Current bus service ===
Since 2026, Q65 service has begun at Main Street and 38th Avenue in Flushing, where there are transfers to the New York City Subway's IRT Flushing Line at Flushing–Main Street, the Long Island Rail Road's Port Washington Branch at Flushing–Main Street, and several other bus routes. Previously, it started at Main Street and Roosevelt Avenue between June 2025 and September 2026, but due to Queens Bus Redesign Improvements, it was moved. It proceeds east along Sanford Avenue, and south along 164th Street to Hillside Avenue. It turns west on Hillside Avenue, then south on Parsons Boulevard, merging with the parallel Q25 route. The two routes proceed south to Jamaica Avenue, then west to Sutphin Boulevard. Both routes terminate at Sutphin Boulevard and 94th Avenue, underneath the Jamaica station for the LIRR and AirTrain JFK, and adjacent to the Sutphin Boulevard–Archer Avenue–JFK Airport subway station.

=== School trippers ===
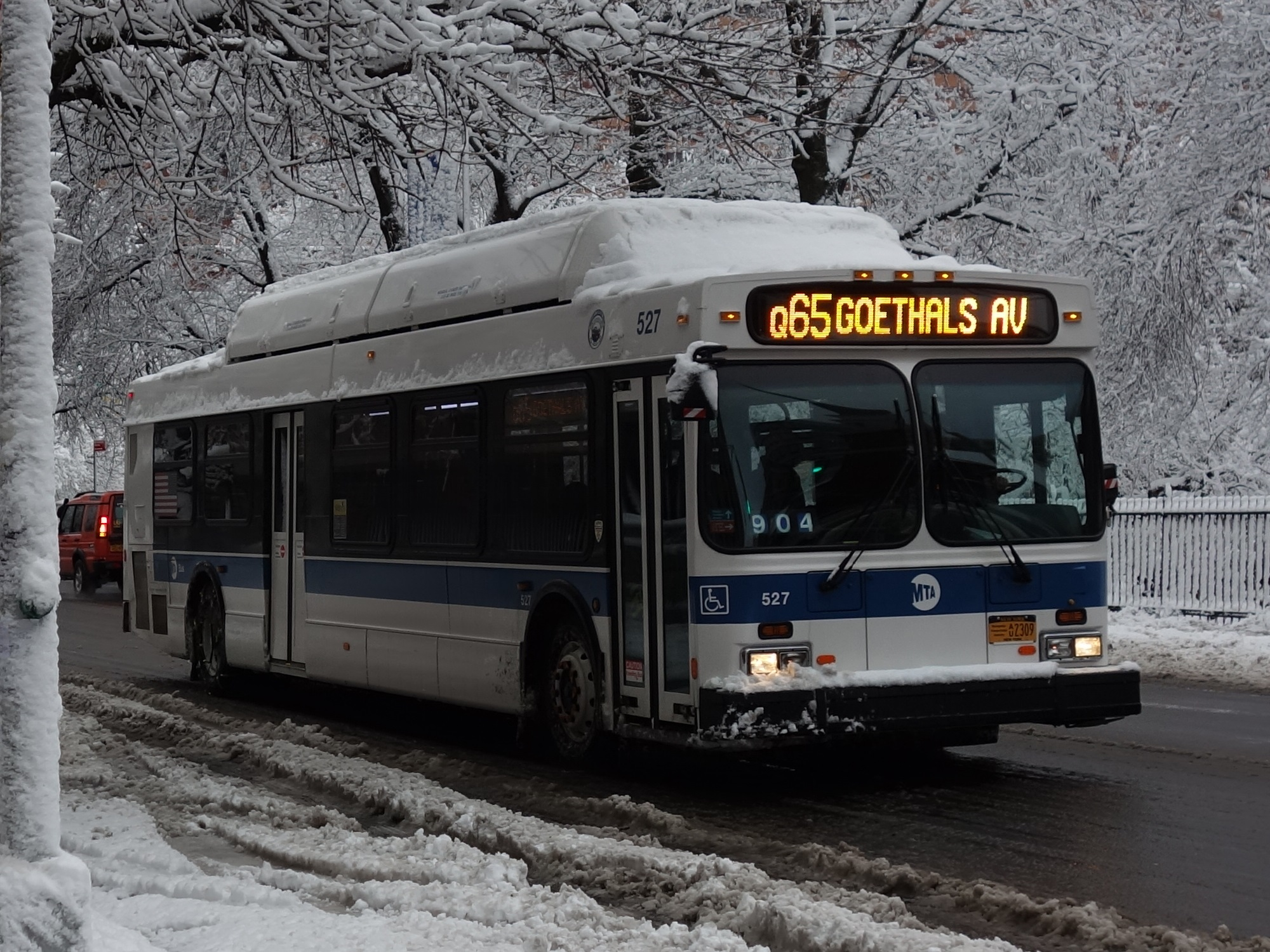
A 2011 C40LF (527) on the Goethals Avenue-bound Q65 at Parsons Blvd/90th Ave near Union Turnpike

When school is in session, select buses from Jamaica terminate at Queens General Hospital near Queens Gateway to Health Sciences at Goethals Avenue during the A.M. rush and originate there during the P.M. rush. From 7:53 to 8:29am, three extra buses run the full route to Flushing.

== History ==
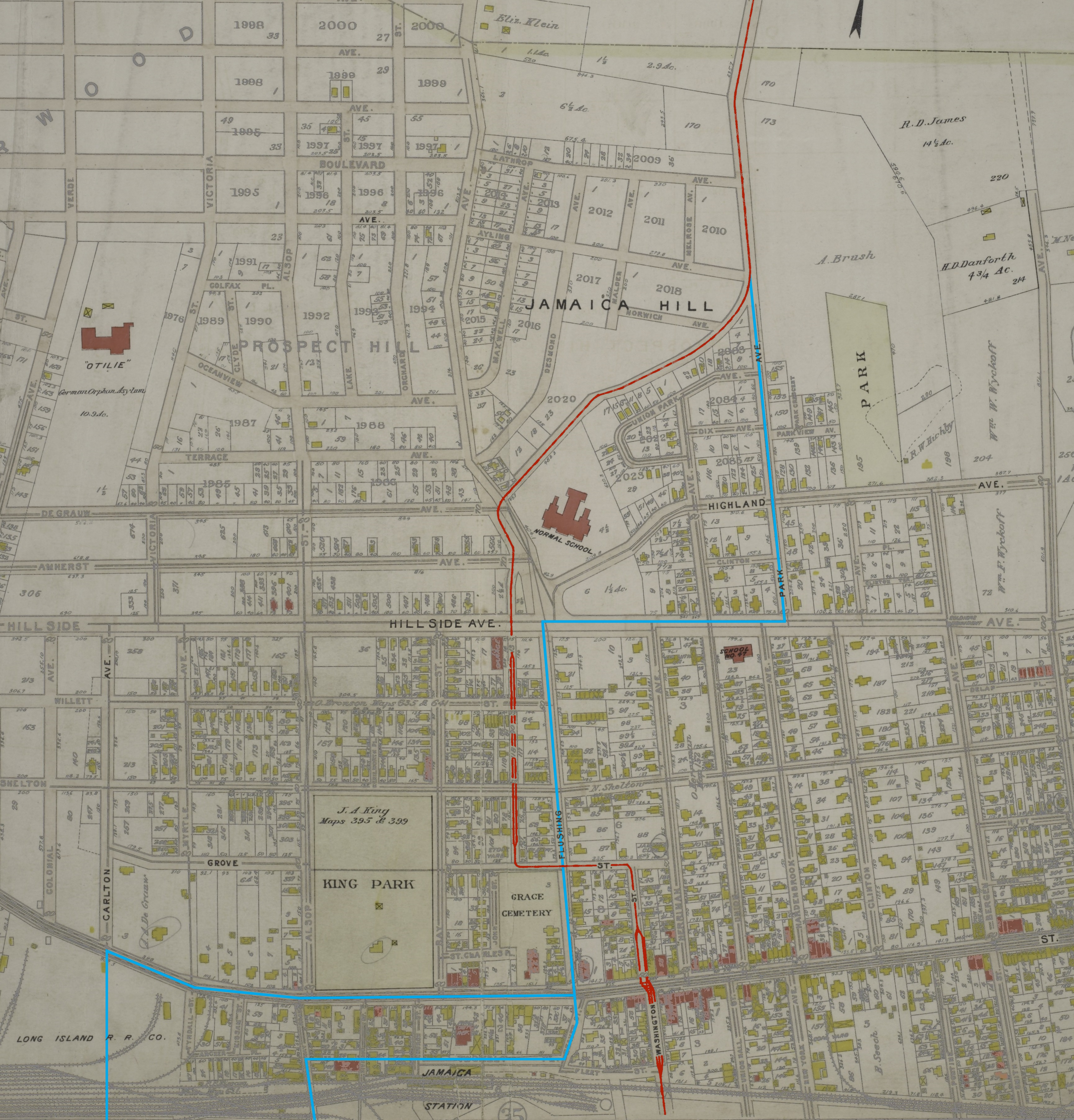
A 1909 map of Jamaica showing the route of the Flushing–Jamaica streetcar route (orange) and the current Q65 bus route (light blue).

=== Streetcar operations ===
On July 26, 1886, the Flushing and College Point Street Railway was incorporated, with the intent of building what became the College Point Line. The then-villages of Flushing and College Point granted franchises to the company in summer 1887, with the provision of only employing overhead trolley wire for five years before switching to battery power. The line began operation on April 7, 1891, running on batteries instead of overhead wire. Because of the expenses of battery power, the railroad went bankrupt and was sold at auction on April 4, 1892. The line was later equipped with overhead wire, improving profits and patronage. On December 31, 1896, the line became part of the New York and Queens County Railway system.

The New York & North Shore Railway Company was organized on March 13, 1897, as a subsidiary to the New York and Queens County Railway. At the end of the month, it proposed several new routes including the Flushing–Jamaica Line. The franchise for the line was awarded on December 31, 1897. Construction began in 1898 and continued through 1899. Service on the line began on December 2, 1899. Earlier that year on October 13, the Long Island Electric Railway (LIER), operators of the Jamaica−Far Rockaway Line, was purchased by the company. Track connections at 160th Street had been built during the construction of the Flushing–Jamaica Line in order to facilitate service between the two lines. On March 12, 1900, through service on the combined routes began between Flushing and Far Rockaway. This service ended on August 1, 1901 after the LIER was bought out by the Hogan Brothers, a group of trolley line surveyors who worked on both the Flushing and Far Rockaway lines. During the month of May in 1902, the Flushing–Jamaica Line was bought out by the parent New York and Queens company, through several complex proceedings and reorganizations. In 1906, it became part of the Interborough Rapid Transit Company (IRT).

The 99th Street Ferry in College Point ceased service in 1913.

In 1923, the line went into bankruptcy and the IRT relinquished ownership. By the mid-1920s, the Flushing–Jamaica Line was double tracked. With the opening of the subway to the Flushing–Main Street subway station on January 21, 1928, Jamaica and College Point service to the 111th Street station was discontinued the following day. On October 2, 1928, Flushing–Jamaica through service was extended to College Point.

=== Decline and conversion to bus service ===
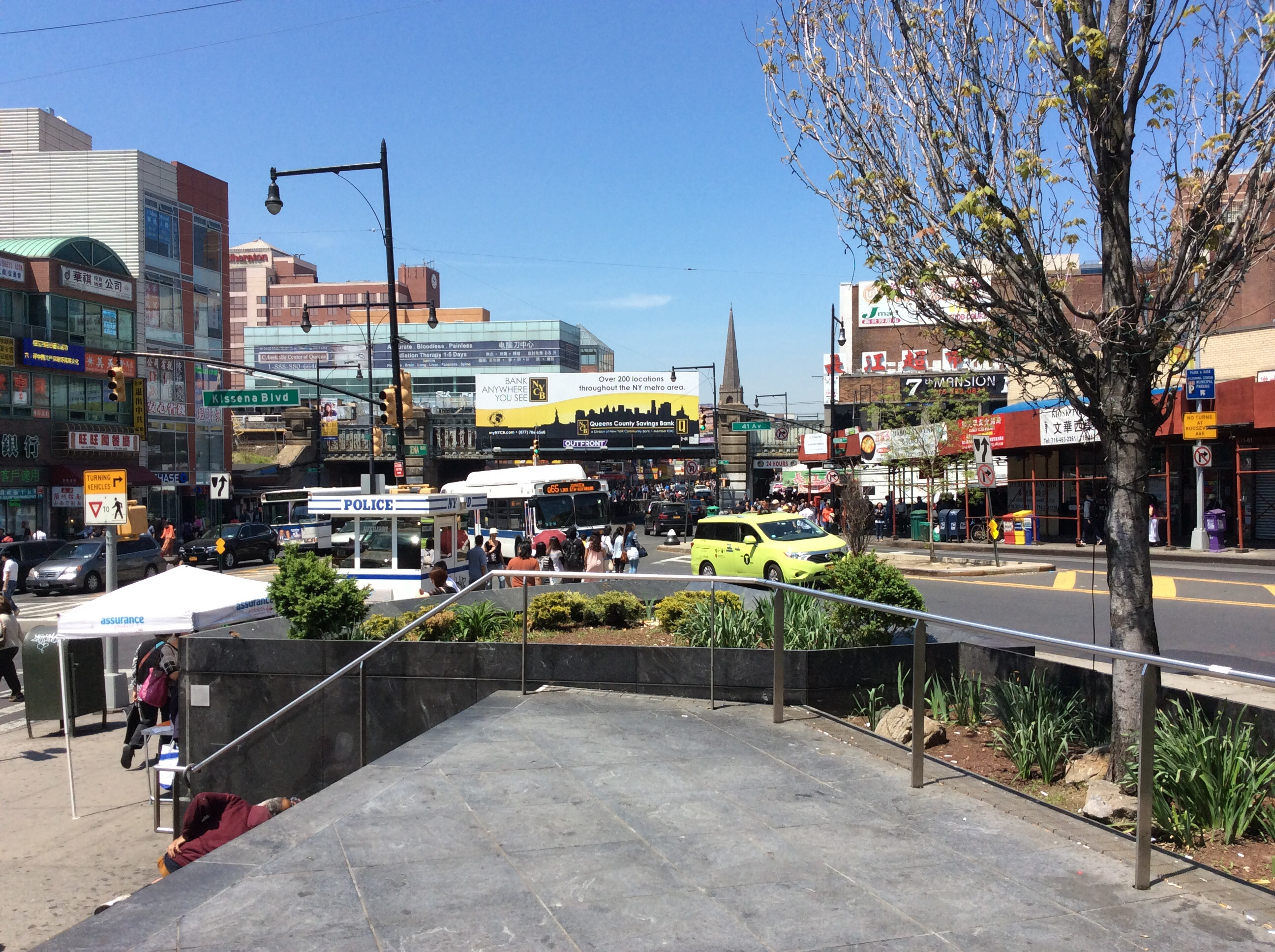
A C40LF on the Jamaica-bound Q65 and an Orion V at Main Street/Kissena Boulevard in May 2015

Around this time, many streetcar lines in Queens and the rest of the city began to be replaced by buses, particularly after the unification of city's three primary transit companies in June 1940. Many local civic organizations had been campaigning for a bus route along the Flushing–Jamaica Line, and the removal of the trolley route that ran in close proximity to private houses. The administration of Mayor Fiorello H. La Guardia, and New York City Parks Commissioner Robert Moses, also desired to use the right-of-way to build the planned Grand Central Parkway (this highway would instead be built along the western end of Flushing Meadows–Corona Park). The College Point trolley, meanwhile, was cited for noise disturbances.

On December 18, 1936, the New York City Board of Estimate voted to motorize the trolley franchises of the New York and Queens County Railway. Bus service between Flushing − Main Street and 160th Street in Jamaica began on July 1, 1937 under the designation "Q-65". On July 2, the railroad turned over the right-of-way of the Flushing–Jamaica Line between Flushing Cemetery and Jamaica to the city in order to create a proper 164th Street. Buses fully replaced trolley service on the Flushing–Jamaica Line on August 10, 1937. Initially, the route ran along Kissena Boulevard and Bowne Street between Horace Harding Boulevard and 46th Avenue, with 164th Street impassible by vehicles through Kissena Park. Service on the College Point trolley was abandoned on August 23 of that year, replaced by buses between 110th Street and Flushing. The Flushing-Jamaica buses were rerouted onto 164th Street after the road was paved and opened on August 10, 1938. The company's stock and property were transferred to its subsidiary Queens-Nassau Transit Lines company, which operated the buses. By 1940, the Q65 route ran between College Point and Jamaica. That year, the company applied for an extension of the route north along 122nd Street (College Point Boulevard), which was never implemented. Queens-Nassau would become the Queens Transit Corporation in 1957.

The bus company would become Queens-Steinway Transit Corporation in 1986, and Queens Surface Corporation in 1988. In 2004, the southern termini of the Q65, Q25, and Q34 were moved west one block along Jamaica Avenue, from 160th Street to Parsons Boulevard.

=== MTA takeover ===
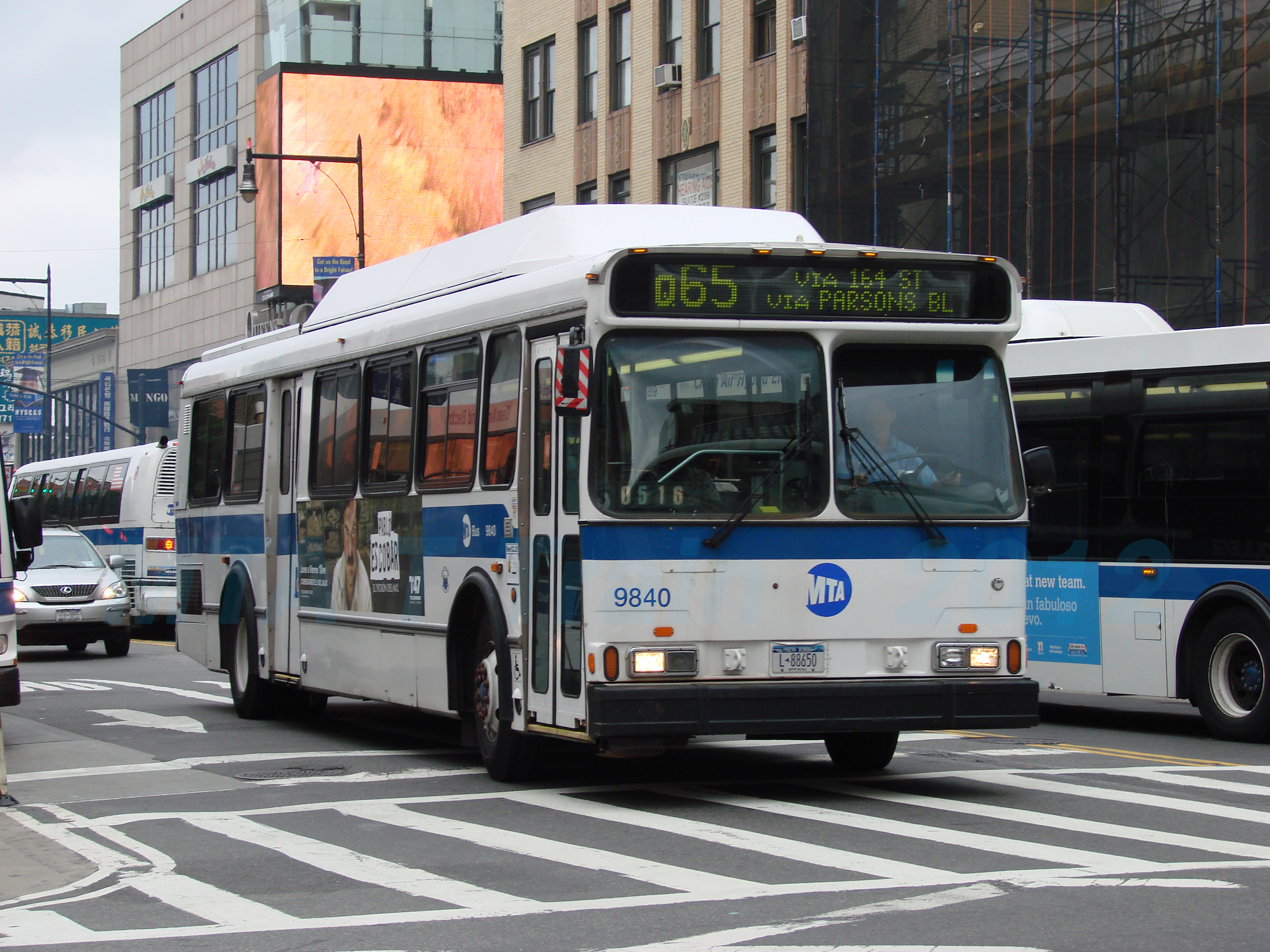
A 1999 Orion V CNG (9840) from the former Queens Surface on the Q65 in Downtown Flushing, headed to Jamaica via Parsons Blvd.

On February 27, 2005, the MTA Bus Company took over the operations of the Queens Surface routes, part of the city's takeover of all the remaining privately operated bus routes. Under the MTA, the Q25, Q34, and Q65 were extended from Jamaica Avenue to the Jamaica LIRR station on Sutphin Boulevard in 2007. Also in 2007, bidirectional limited-stop service was introduced on the Q65 during rush hours between Jamaica and Flushing–Main Street.

On April 15, 2013, Q65 Limited service began skipping two stops along College Point Boulevard, at 26th Avenue and the Whitestone Expressway, due to low ridership. In 2014, the 164th Street corridor along with the Parsons/Kissena corridor and Main Street corridor were evaluated for a potential Select Bus Service (SBS) route between Flushing and Jamaica. The Q65 Limited was not selected for conversion; the Q44 Limited became the Q44 SBS on November 29, 2015, and the Q25 Limited was studied for future conversion. In September 2015, as part of the Northeast Queens Bus Study, it was suggested to modify a small portion of the Q65 route near Flushing Cemetery, taking it off Bowne Street and moving it onto the wider Parsons Boulevard.

In September 2016, because Q65 buses frequently detoured to avoid traffic on the narrow 14th Road, the Q65 was rerouted to run via 14th Avenue in College Point. Six bus stops on 14th Road were discontinued and replaced by three stops on 14th Avenue.

==== Bus redesign ====
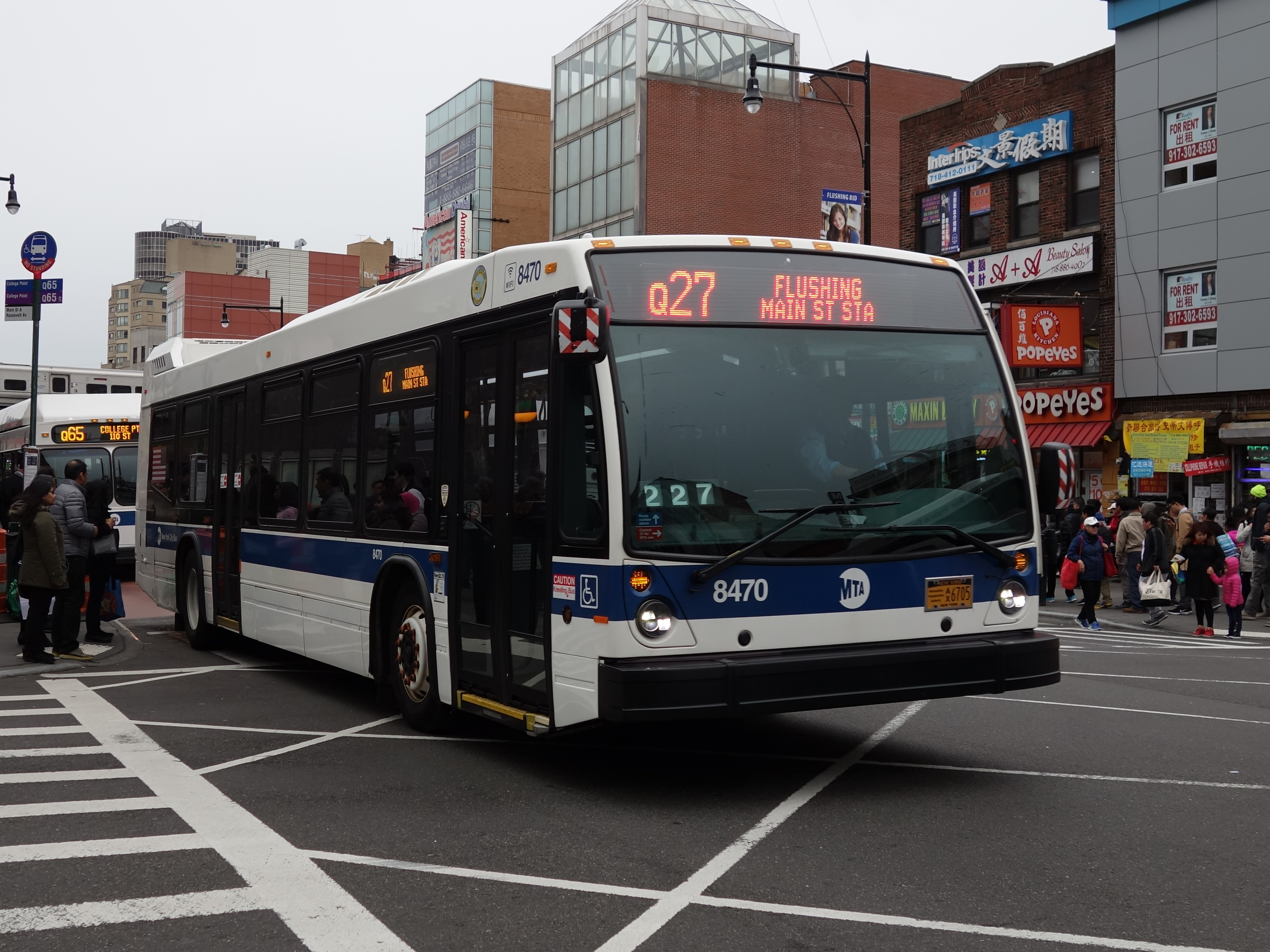
A C40LF on the College Point-bound Q65 at Main Street/Roosevelt Avenue, behind a Flushing-bound Q27 in 2018

In December 2019, the MTA released a draft redesign of the Queens bus network. As part of the redesign, the Q65 bus would have become a "neighborhood" route called the QT65. Rather than serve Flushing and College Point, the QT65 would have continued north along 160th Street to Beechhurst. The redesign was delayed due to the COVID-19 pandemic in New York City in 2020, and the original draft plan was dropped due to negative feedback.

A revised plan was released in March 2022. As part of the new plan, the Q65 would still run to Flushing, but service to College Point would be replaced by an extension of the Q27 bus. The Q65 would also be extended south to Liberty Avenue and Farmers Boulevard in St. Albans, Queens, providing local service for the Q83 bus along Liberty Avenue, where the Q83 would run nonstop.

A final bus-redesign plan was released in December 2023. The Q65 would run to Flushing, but service to College Point would be replaced by an extension of the Q26 bus, and the route would be modified in Murray Hill to avoid narrow streets. In addition, the Q65 would no longer be extended southward, and weekday Limited-Stop Service would be discontinued.

On December 17, 2024, addendums to the final plan were released. Among these, stop changes were made on the Q65. On January 29, 2025, the current plan was approved by the MTA Board, and the Queens Bus Redesign went into effect in two different phases during Summer 2025. The Q65 is part of Phase I, which started on June 29, 2025.

== Incidents ==
On December 25, 2019, a bus on the Q65 was hit by a Mercedes-Benz at the Grand Central Parkway. Four of the ten passengers on the bus were injured, as well as the drivers of both vehicles.
