= Main Street (Queens) =

Street in Queens, New York

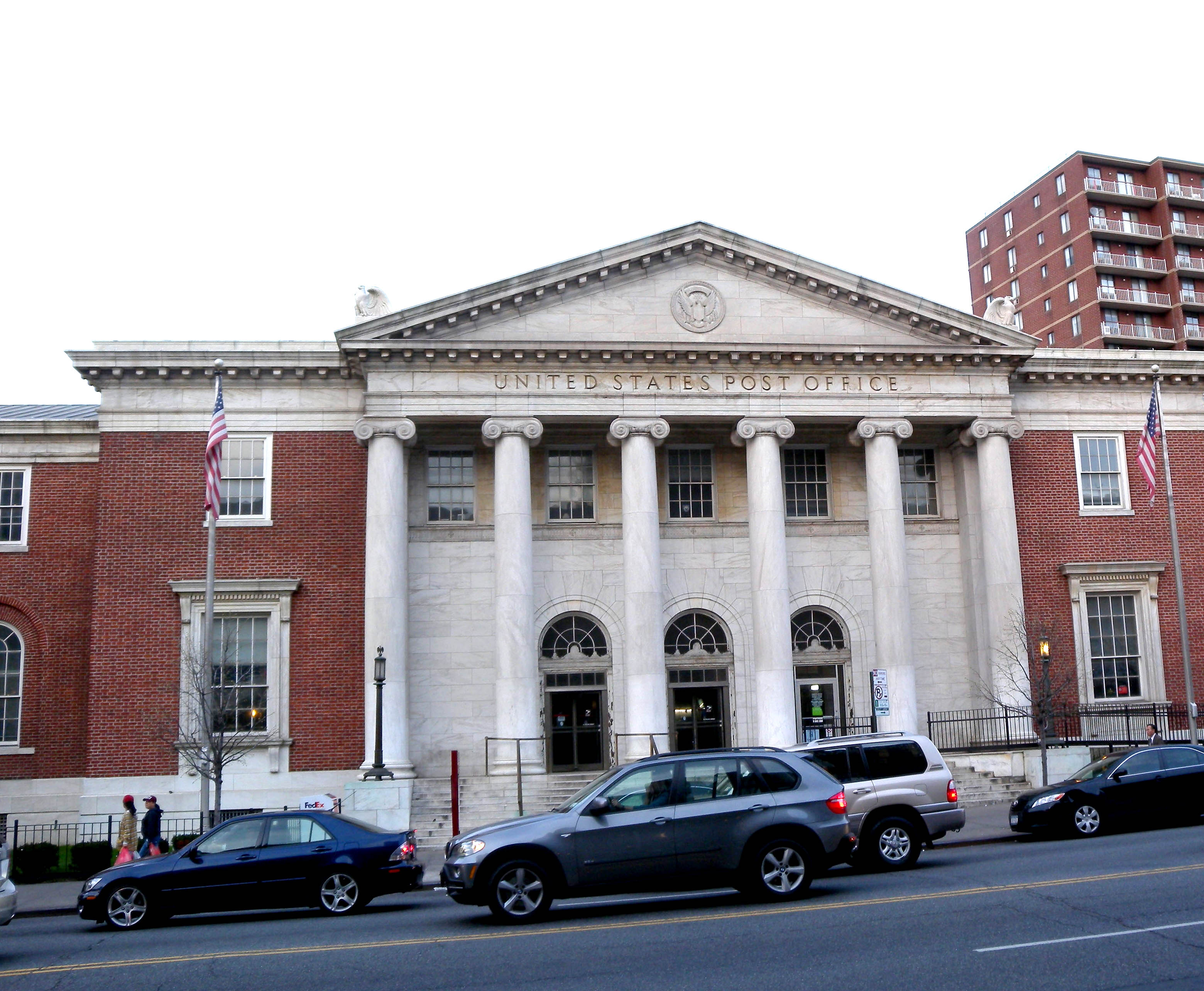
- Flushing Main Post Office on Main Street
- Interactive map of Main Street
- Owner: City of New York
- Maintained by: NYCDOT
- Length: 3.9 mi (6.3 km)
- Location: Queens, New York City
- South end: I-678 / NY 25 in Briarwood
- Major junctions: Grand Central Parkway in Kew Gardens Hills; I-495 in Queensboro Hill
- North end: NY 25A in Flushing

Main Street is a major north–south street in the borough of Queens in New York City, extending from Queens Boulevard in Briarwood to Northern Boulevard in Flushing. Created in the 17th century as one of Flushing's main roads, Main Street has been lengthened at various points in its existence.

== Route description ==
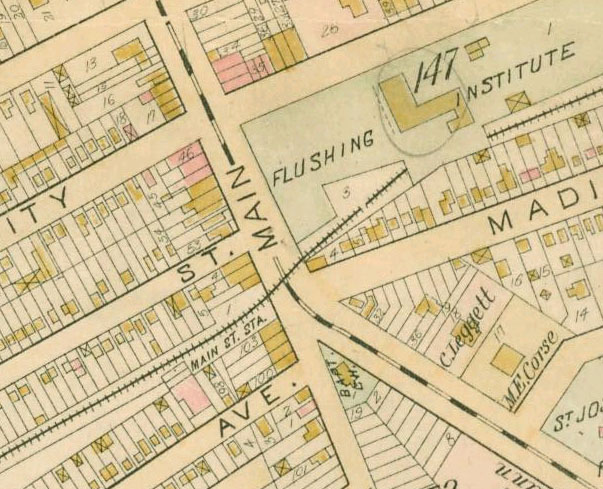
Map of the intersection of Main Street and Kissena Boulevard in 1891.

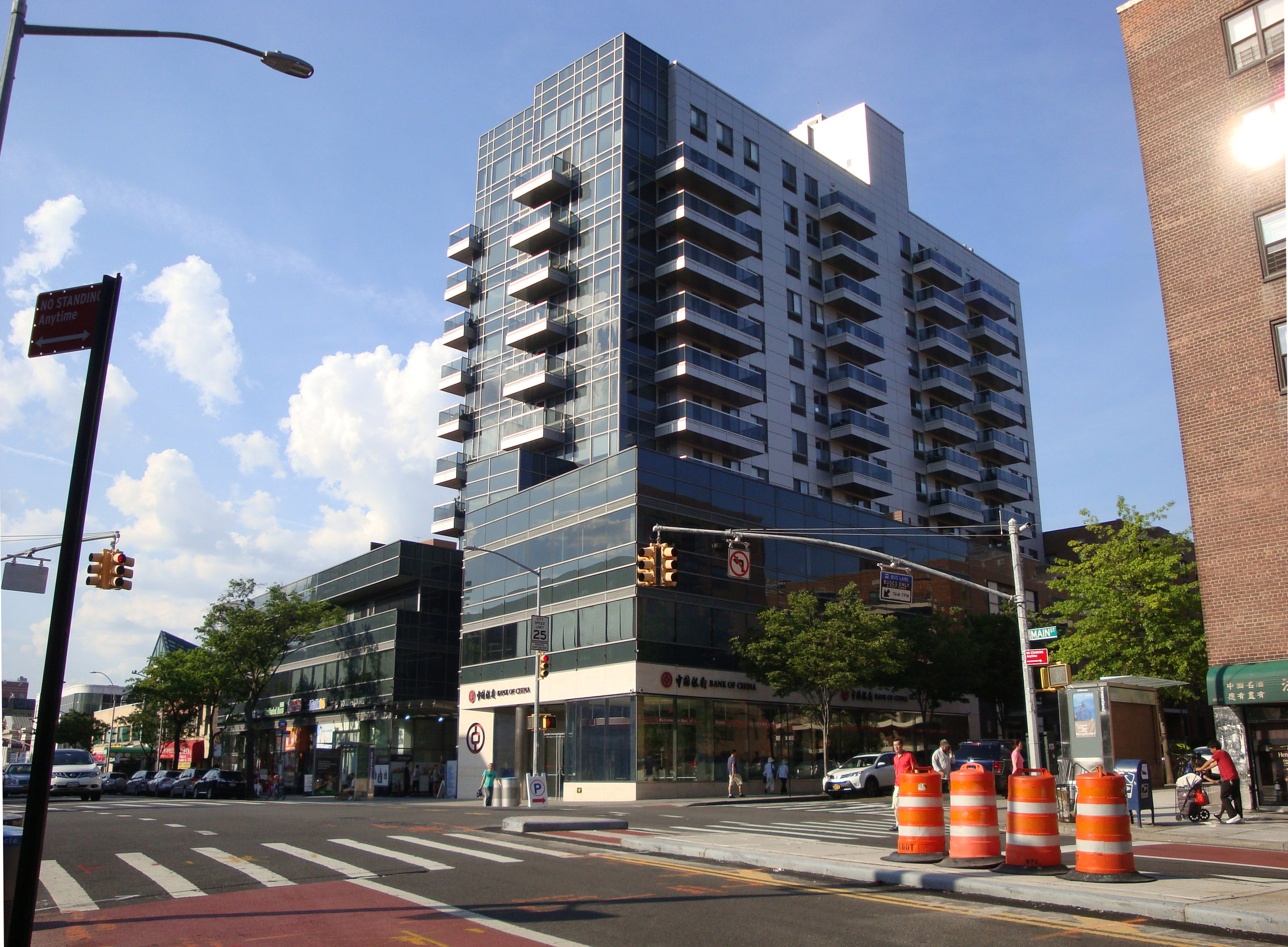
Bank of China

Main Street runs relatively north to south with two to three lanes in either direction, and serves as the major road for Flushing, Queens. From the north, it begins at Northern Boulevard in Downtown Flushing, also known as Flushing Chinatown, one of New York City's largest Asian enclaves. Just south of Roosevelt Avenue and the Long Island Rail Road overpass, Kissena Boulevard (formerly Jamaica Road) branches off from Main Street at a triangle, before traveling on a parallel course. After passing through Kissena Park, Main Street intersects with the Long Island Expressway north of Queens College.

South of Queens College, it intersects with Jewel Avenue near the neighborhood of Pomonok. The stretch of Main Street in Kew Gardens Hills south of the Long Island Expressway is home to a large Jewish community, including many Orthodox, Ashkenazi, and Bukharan Jews. At the south end of Kew Gardens Hills near Jamaica, Main Street intersects with Union Turnpike and the Grand Central Parkway service road. Westbound Union Turnpike feeds into the Kew Gardens Interchange, connecting to the Grand Central, the Van Wyck Expressway, the Jackie Robinson Parkway, and Queens Boulevard. Near its southern end, two entrance ramps branch off from the center of Main Street, feeding into the southbound Van Wyck. The two one-way spurs of Main Street run for three more blocks before ending in Briarwood, at adjacent intersections with Queens Boulevard.

The most congested area of Main Street is at its northern end in Downtown Flushing, between Sanford Avenue and Northern Boulevard. Other congestion points include the intersections with the Long Island Expressway; the Union Turnpike/Grand Central Parkway (GCP) interchange, from 73rd Avenue south to the GCP; and its southern terminus, at Queens Boulevard. The growth of the business activity at the core of Downtown Flushing, dominated by the Flushing Chinatown, has continued to flourish despite the COVID-19 pandemic.

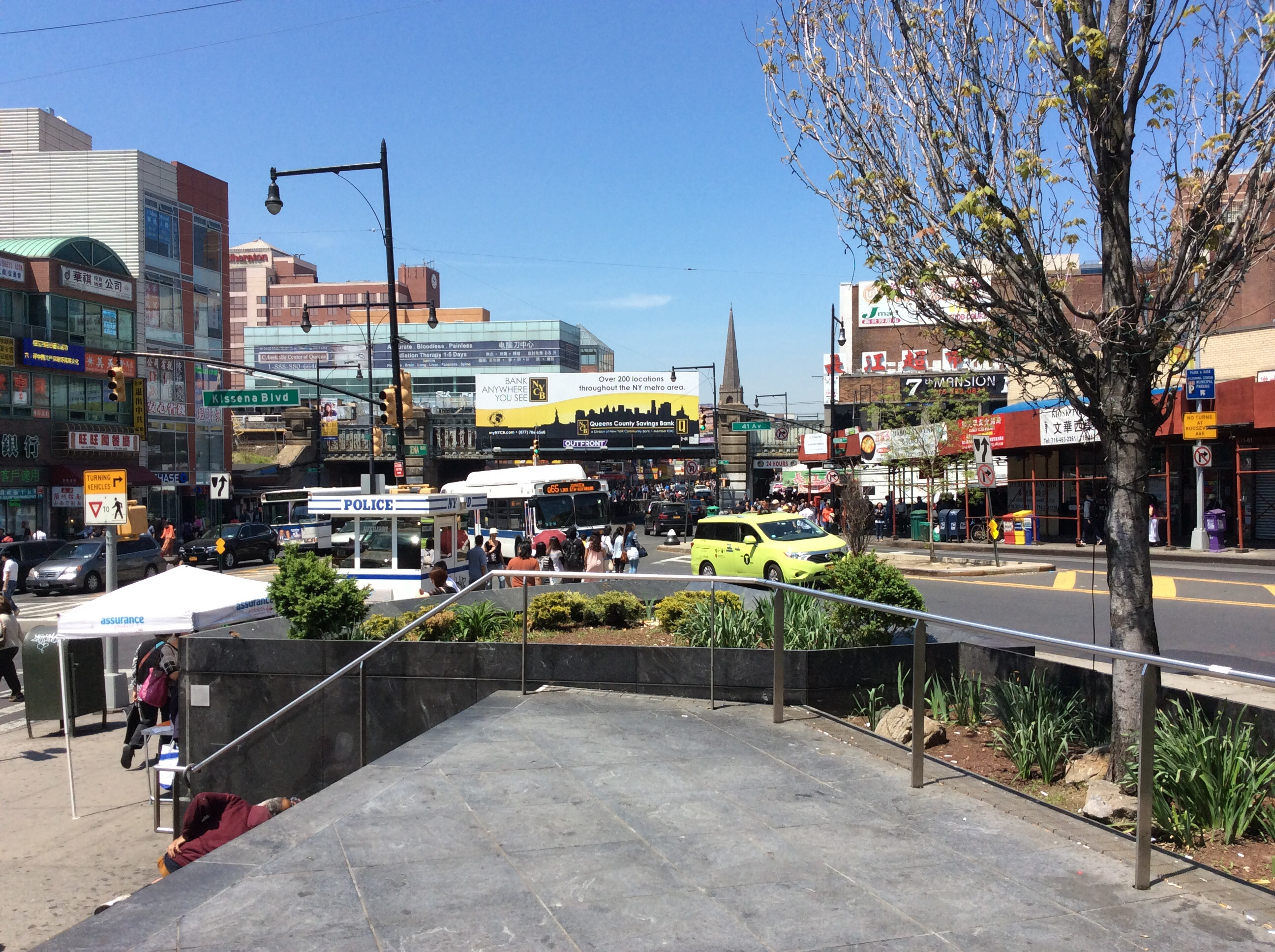
Intersection of Main Street and Kissena Boulevard in Downtown Flushing, 2015.

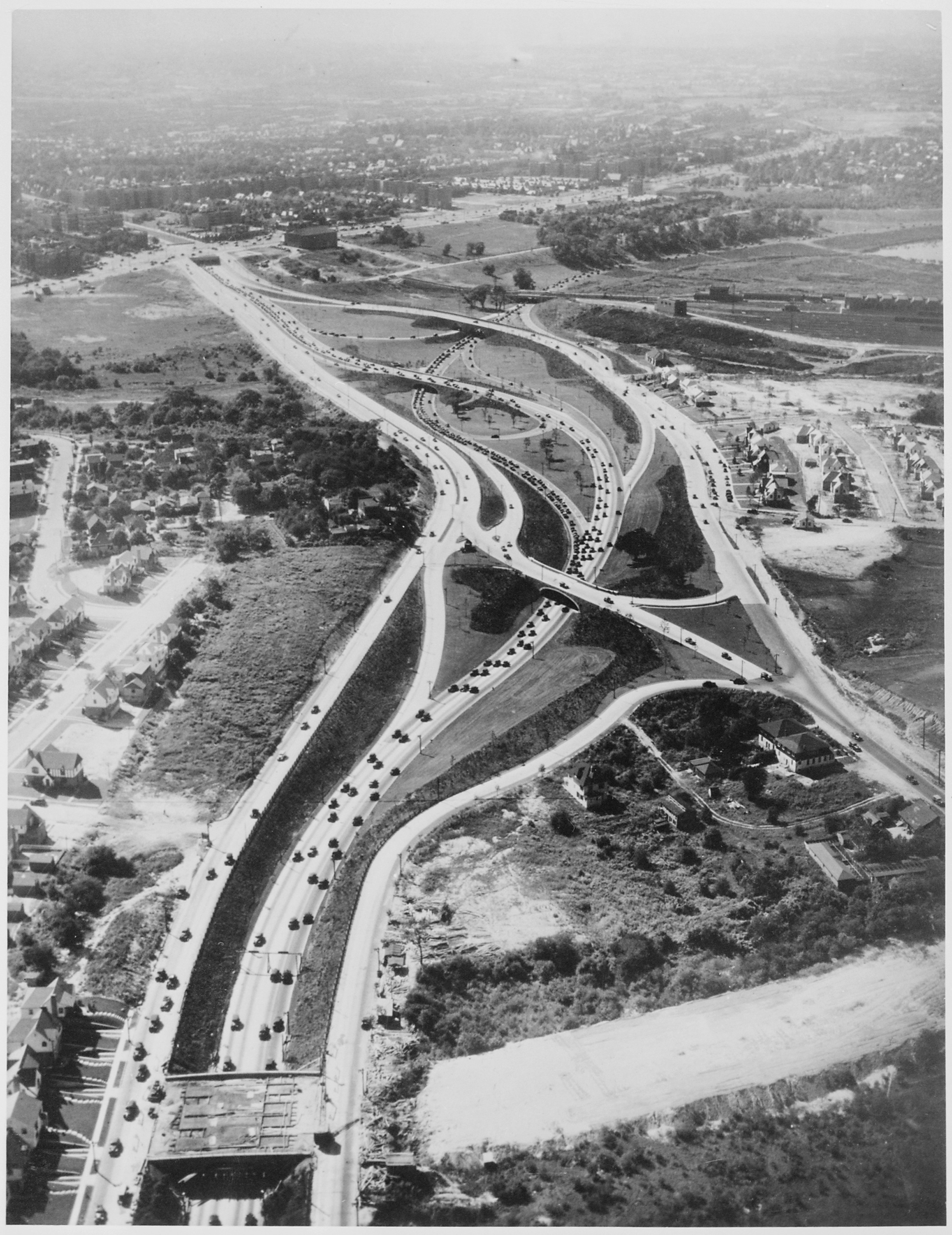
Main Street in foreground, interchange under construction around 1946.

== History ==
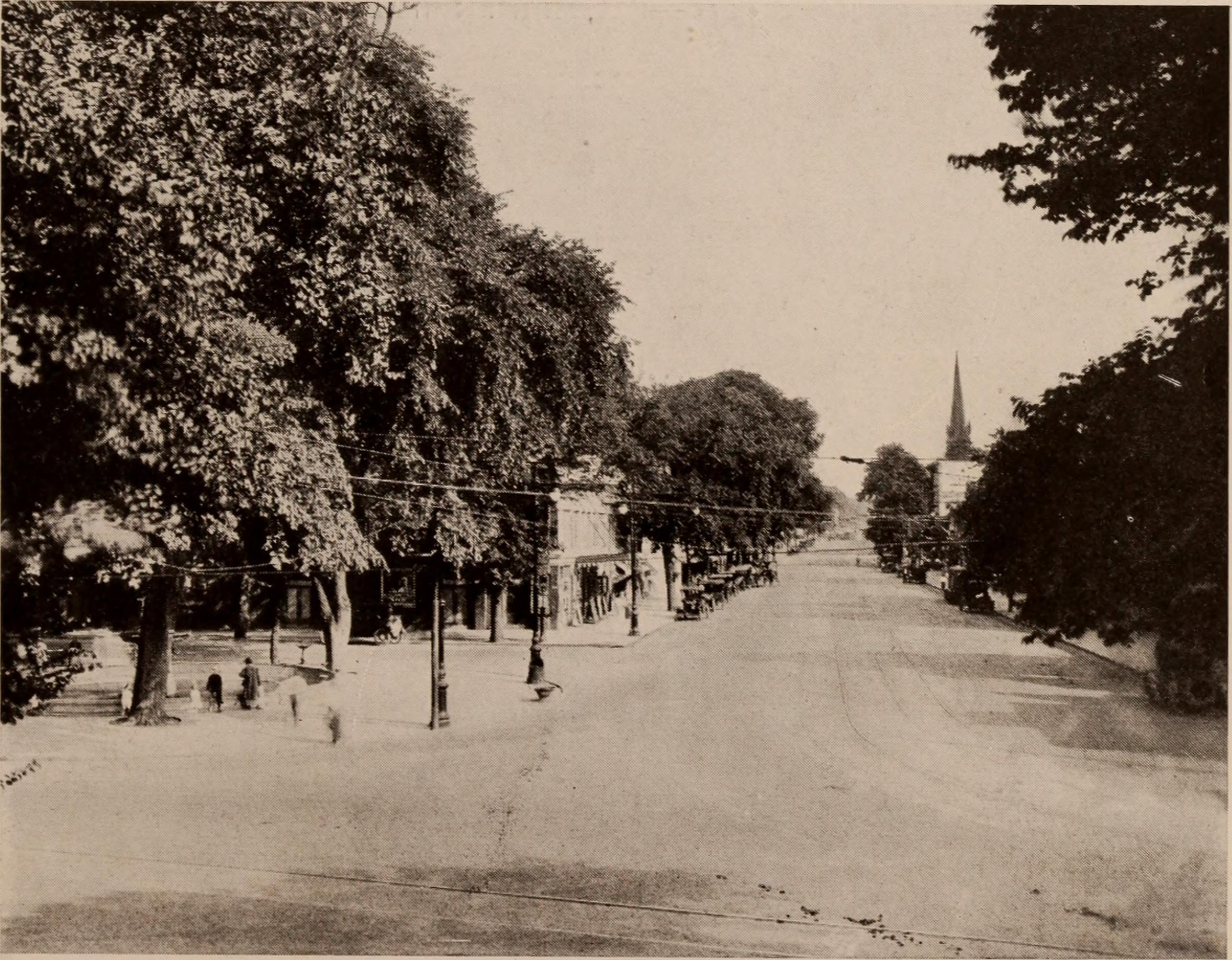
North end of Main Street, early 20th century

For much of its early history Main Street was a quiet, small-town street. In the beginning, it did not extend south of the Port Washington Branch of the Long Island Rail Road. The intersection of Main Street and Northern Boulevard, built in the 17th century, is one of the oldest modern intersections in the United States. As of 1891, it continued four blocks south to Franklin Avenue, as another street called Jaggar Avenue.

The street was extended to Cedar Grove Cemetery in 1920. By 1932, Main Street's south end was Reeves Avenue, at the former Spring Hill Golf Club. In 1938, an extension opened to the Grand Central Parkway. By 1940, the areas around Main Street's northern end, near Flushing, were largely developed. Kew Gardens Hills was built around Main Street after World War II. On November 23, 1954, the extension south to Queens Boulevard and the Van Wyck Expressway was opened.

In the 1970s, in the wake of the 1976 fiscal crisis, more real estate became available. The area was quickly settled by Chinese and Koreans. By the late 2000s, the area around Main Street was considered a very diverse community. The New York Times compared it to the classical Main Street and contrasted its character against Wall Street in Manhattan. In the 2020s, Downtown Flushing is undergoing rapid gentrification by Chinese transnational entities.

== Transportation ==
=== Bus service ===
The primary public transportation on Main Street is the Q44 bus route, running from the Jamaica Center area through the entire length of Main Street before continuing to the Bronx. In 1999, the Q44 was converted into a limited-stop service, supplemented by Q20 local bus running from Jamaica to College Point. Prior to 2010, the now-defunct Q74 bus served the southern portion of the street between 73rd and Reeves Avenues. The route, which ran between Kew Gardens – Union Turnpike station and Queens College, was eliminated in 2010 due to budget cuts within the MTA. The X51 express bus served a portion of the street between Elder Avenue near Kissena Park and Horace Harding Expressway, before being discontinued in the 2010 cuts due to low ridership.

Many buses travel through or terminate on the section of Main Street located in Flushing. These buses travel through:

- The Q25 and Q26 serve the corridor between Kissena Boulevard and Northern Boulevard. Only the Q26 heads west on Northern Boulevard. Southbound, they are joined by the N20G and N20X starting at Roosevelt Avenue.

These buses terminate on Main Street:

- The Q50 goes north to Northern Boulevard and heads east. It then continues to Pelham Bay Park, with rush hour service to Co-op City, Bronx.
- The Q61 terminates on the opposite side of Main Street, also heading east on Northern Boulevard towards Beechhurst.
- The Q19, Q63 and Q66 also go north to the boulevard, but head west to serve Astoria, Court Square, and Queens Plaza, respectively.
- The Q17, Q27 and Q65 head south to Kissena Boulevard, then continue towards Jamaica or Cambria Heights (Q27 only).
- In the Flushing direction:
  - The Q13 and Q15 head north from Roosevelt Avenue to 39th Avenue.
  - The Q12 heads south from Northern Boulevard to 38th Avenue, before deadheading to Roosevelt Avenue for Little Neck service.
  - The Q90 diverts from Roosevelt Avenue to terminate, then deadheads to 39th Avenue for LaGuardia Airport service.

Several other buses intersect with the street at other major streets along the route.

==== Bus lanes ====
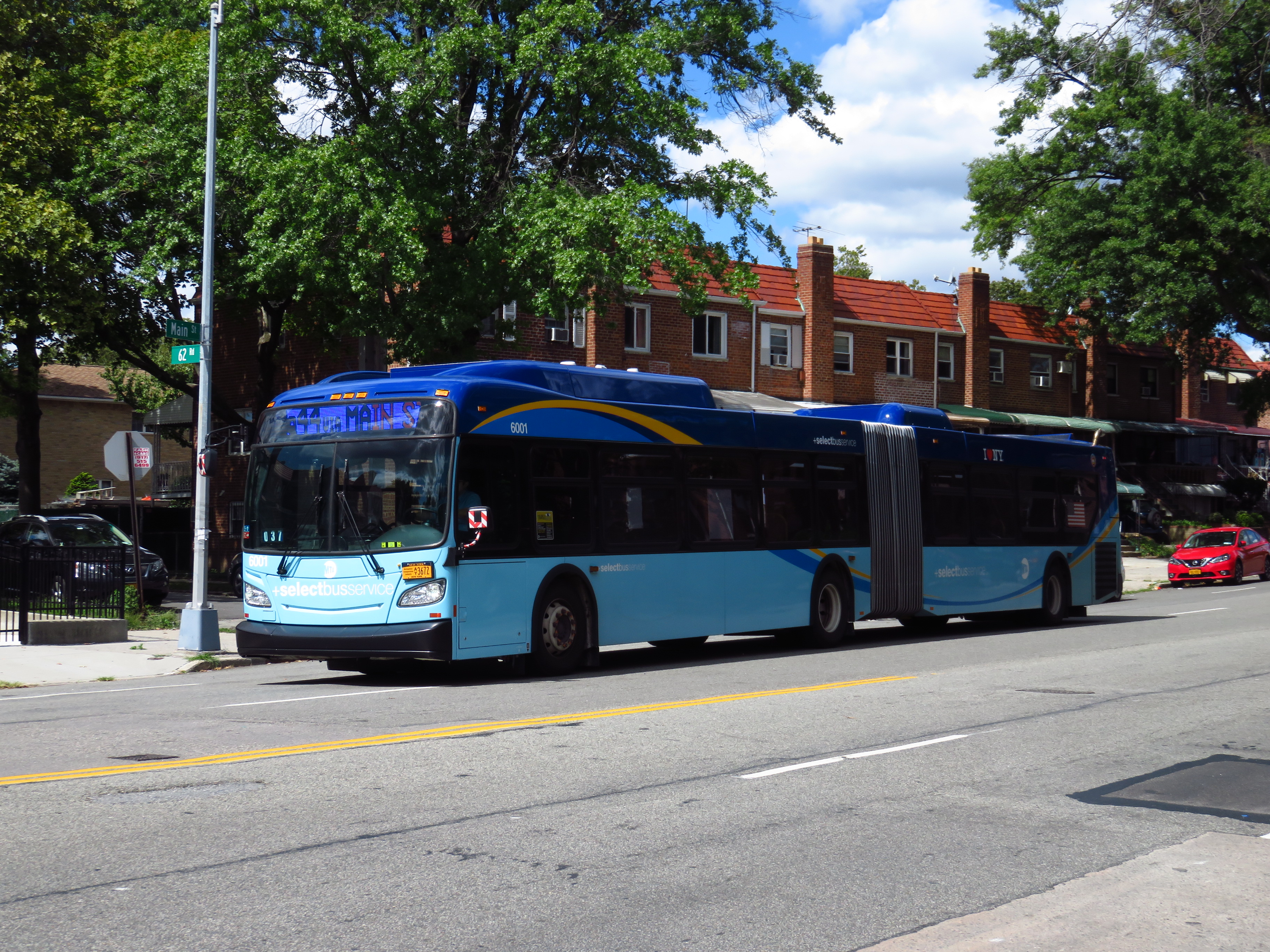
A Q44 Select Bus Service bus at Main Street and 62nd Road in Flushing

The Main Street corridor, along with the parallel Kissena/Parsons Boulevard corridor and the 164th Street corridor, was studied by the NYC Department of Transportation in 2015 for the implementation of Select Bus Service (SBS) between Flushing and Jamaica. This would convert the Q44 route into a bus rapid transit line. As part of the proposal, a bus only lane was proposed for installation on Main Street between Reeves Avenue and Northern Boulevard, as well as on parts of Hillside Avenue and Sutphin Boulevard. After backlash from local businesses, the bus lanes in the Queensboro Hill section of Flushing and in Kew Gardens Hills were dropped from the SBS proposal. However, the Q44 route was approved for SBS conversion in June 2015, and was implemented on November 29, 2015.

In October 2016, the New York City Department of Transportation announced that southbound traffic on Main Street between 37th Avenue and 40th Road would be converted to a busway restricted to buses and local delivery vehicles. This would allow bus speeds to be maintained during the construction of widened sidewalks. The busway was implemented in 2017, resulted in a 23 percent increase in bus speeds. The southbound traffic restriction was made permanent in 2018.

In June 2020, Mayor Bill de Blasio announced that the city would test out a northbound busway on Main Street in Downtown Flushing. Almost all Main Street business owners expressed opposition to the busway in a survey, leading a New York Supreme Court judge to place an injunction in November 2020. In January 2021, the busway was introduced on the northbound lanes of Main Street and Kissena Boulevard between Sanford Avenue and Northern Boulevard.

=== Subway and rail ===
On the New York City Subway, the E, F, and <F> trains of the IND Queens Boulevard Line serve the street at the Briarwood station, where the street intersects with Queens Boulevard and the Van Wyck Expressway.

The Downtown Flushing section of the route contains its busiest transit hub, revolving around the Flushing–Main Street terminal for the New York City Subway's 7 and <7> trains at Roosevelt Avenue. The Long Island Rail Road serves the area at its elevated station one block south.

== Education ==
=== Schools ===
Flushing High School is located a few blocks away from the northern terminus. The Queens College campus, which also houses Townsend Harris High School and John Bowne High School, is located between Reeves Avenue (near the Long Island Expressway) and Melbourne Avenue. Archbishop Molloy High School is located at the southern end of Main Street. An Orthodox Jewish girls' high school, Shevach High School, is located on Main Street between 75th Avenue and 75th Road.

=== Libraries ===
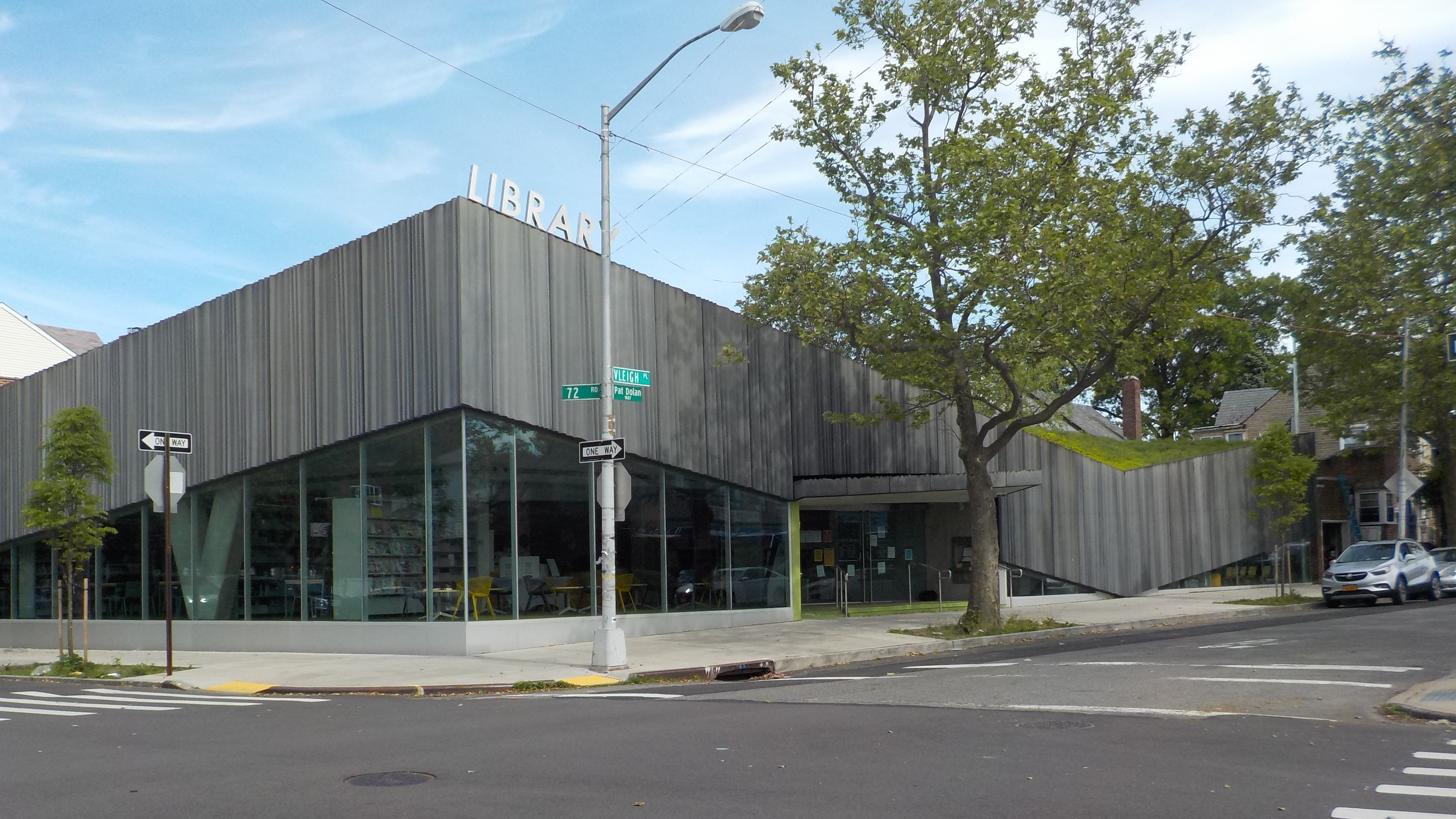
Kew Gardens Hills branch of Queens Public Library

Several branches of Queens Library are located on Main Street, including the large Flushing branch at Kissena Boulevard which was rebuilt in the 1990s. The Kew Gardens Hills branch is near the south end of Main Street.

== Points of interest ==
Notable points of interest include:

- St. George's Church near Roosevelt Avenue
- Flushing Main Post Office, between Sanford and Maple Avenues
- Queens Botanical Garden and Kissena Corridor Park between Dahlia and 56th Avenues
- NewYork–Presbyterian/Queens (formerly Booth Memorial Hospital and New York Hospital Queens), part of the NewYork–Presbyterian Healthcare System, at Booth Memorial Avenue. Several additional buildings are located farther south.
- Cedar Grove Cemetery, between Reeves Avenue and 68th Drive, north of Jewel Avenue

== Other Main Streets in New York City ==
There are four other Main Streets in the four other boroughs of New York City:

- In Edgewater Park, the Bronx, Main Street is so obscure that it is not notated on street signs. It is a short road in a 675-unit co-op. This Main Street is rarely referred to by its name.
- In Dumbo, Brooklyn, Main Street is a two-block cobblestone street that still has old pieces of railroad track embedded into the cobblestones.
- On Roosevelt Island in Manhattan, Main Street is the sole north–south artery on the island, and is lined mainly with apartment buildings, hospitals, and a small town center consisting of several businesses.
- In Tottenville, Staten Island, Main Street is a six-block artery that runs north to south at the western end of the neighborhood.

Of the five Main Streets in New York City, the one in Queens is the busiest and most prominent.

== See also ==
- Flushing Chinatown, also known as Downtown Flushing
