= Q17 (New York City bus) =

Bus route in Queens, New York

q17
- Flushing−Fresh Meadows−Jamaica
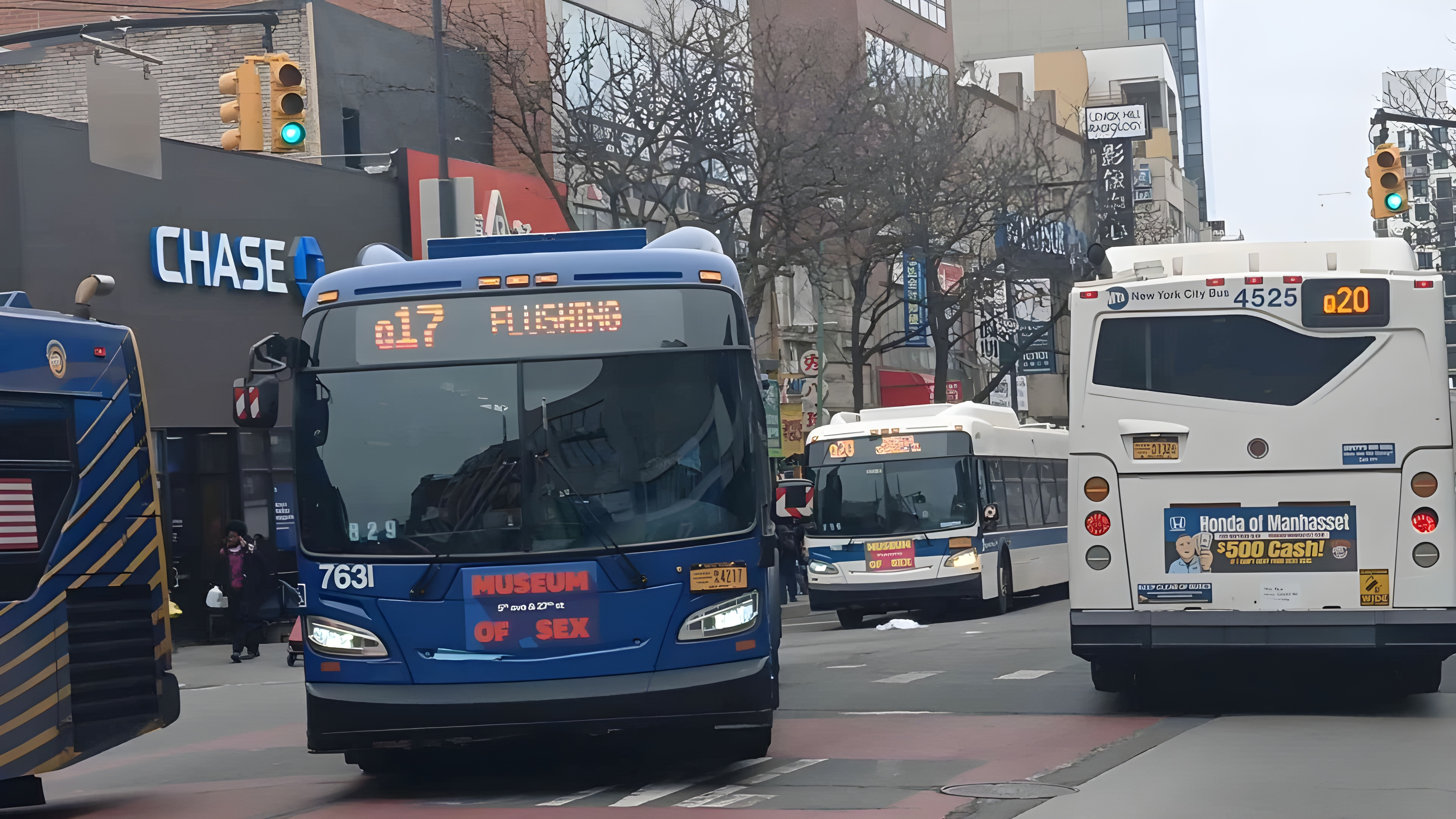
- A 2018 New Flyer XD40 (7631) on the Q17 in Flushing, Queens.

Overview
- System: MTA Regional Bus Operations
- Operator: New York City Transit Authority
- Garage: Jamaica Depot
- Vehicle: Nova Bus LFS; New Flyer Xcelsior XD40
- Began service: 1928

Route
- Locale: Queens, New York, U.S.
- Communities served: Flushing, Pomonok, Fresh Meadows, Utopia, Jamaica Estates, Jamaica
- Start: Flushing – Main Street & Roosevelt Avenue / Main Street station
- Via: Kissena Boulevard, Horace Harding Expressway, 188th Street, Hillside Avenue
- End: Jamaica – Merrick Boulevard and Jamaica Avenue
- Length: 7 miles (11 km)
- Other routes: Q25 127th St/Kissena/Parsons Blvds; Q65 164th St

Service
- Operates: 24 hours
- Annual patronage: 3,700,286 (2025)
- Transfers: Yes
- Timetable: Q17

The Q17 bus route constitutes a public transit line in Queens, New York City, running primarily along Kissena Boulevard, the Long Island Expressway service road (Horace Harding Expressway) and 188th Street between two major bus-subway hubs in the neighborhoods of Jamaica and Flushing. It is one of the busiest local bus routes in Queens. Operated by the North Shore Bus Company until 1947, the route is now operated by MTA Regional Bus Operations under the New York City Transit brand.

== Route description and service ==
The Q17 begins at Merrick Boulevard and Jamaica Avenue at Jamaica Center in downtown Jamaica, just south of the 165th Street Bus Terminal. This terminus is shared with the Q20 and Q44 buses. The Q17 proceeds north along 168th Street to Hillside Avenue, then east along Hillside to 188th Street. The route continues north on 188th Street through Jamaica Estates and Utopia to the Long Island Expressway (LIE) at the Fresh Meadows shopping center. The segment on 188th Street between 73rd Avenue and the LIE is shared with the Q88. Both routes turns west onto the LIE's service road, Horace Harding Expressway, until Kissena Boulevard, where the Q17 turns north. The Q88 continues along Horace Harding to Queens Center Mall. The Q17 proceeds north along Kissena, sharing the road with the Q25 to Main Street in Downtown Flushing (also known as Flushing Chinatown). The Q17 alights its final passengers on 39th Avenue, at the Main Street subway station. Terminating Q17 buses proceed east along 39th Avenue, lay over on 138th Street, then return along 37th Avenue to pick up southbound passengers at Main Street and Roosevelt Avenue.

During weekday midday hours and weekday rush hours in the peak direction (AM to Flushing; PM to Jamaica), alternate southbound local service terminates at 188th Street and Horace Harding Expressway in Fresh Meadows.

The original Q17 route ran along Homelawn Street, Utopia Parkway, and Fresh Meadow Lane between Hillside Avenue and Horace Harding, passing by St. John's University. This route is now covered by the Q30 (formerly the Q17A) and the Q31.

=== School trippers ===
When school is in session, several trips leave Francis Lewis High School and go to Flushing between 1:37 and 4:18pm. Trips may begin just outside the school or at the closest regular stop. One more trip leaves J.H.S. 216 George J. Ryan for Jamaica at 2:39pm, heading to Horace Harding Expressway via 64th Avenue.

== History ==
=== 1920s to 1970s ===
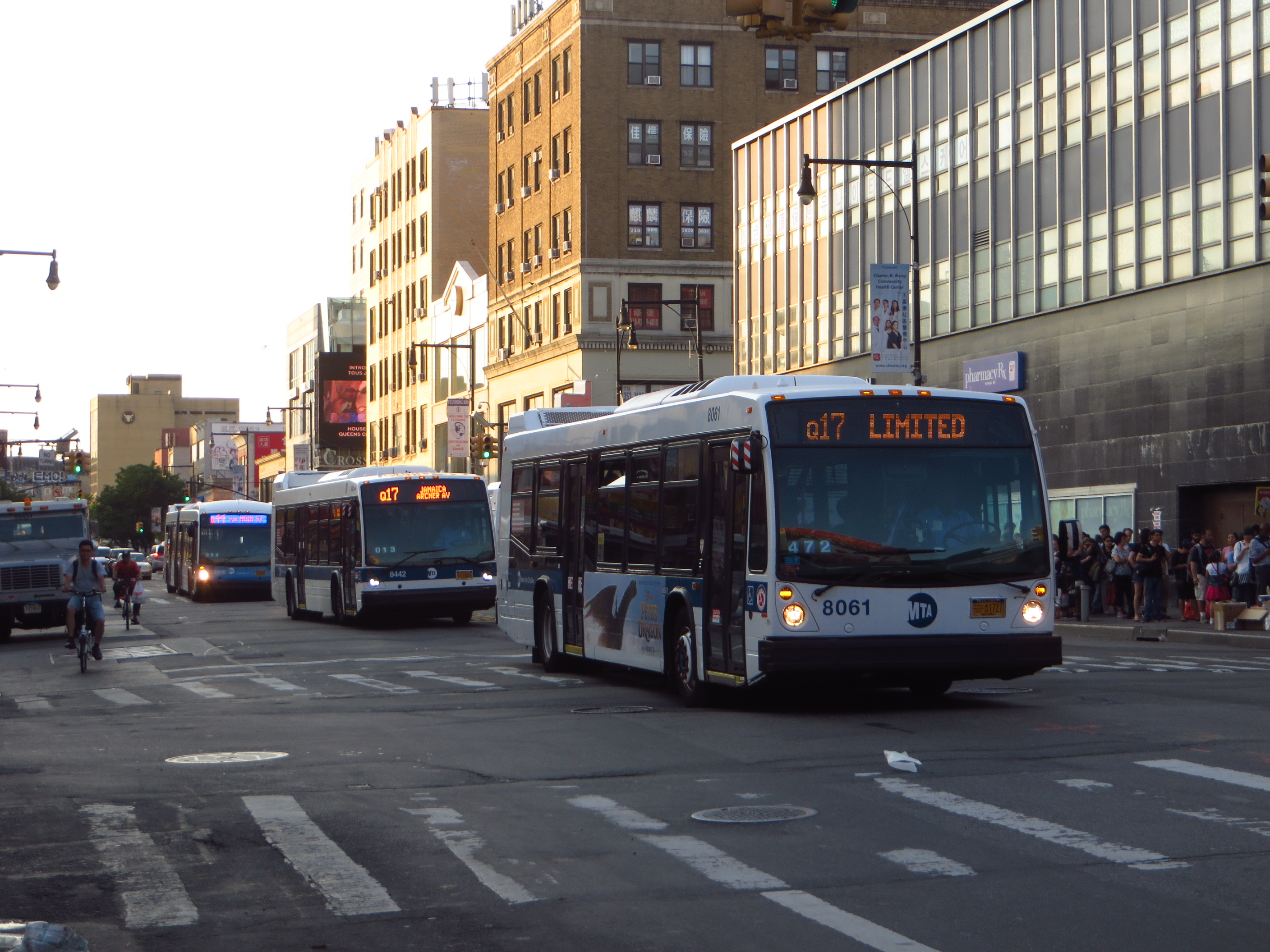
A 2011 Nova Bus LFS (8061) on the Q17 Limited (front) and a 2016 Nova Bus LFS (8442) on the Q17 local (middle), both departing Downtown Flushing for Jamaica.

The Q17 was originally operated by the Flushing Heights Bus Company, which began operating circa 1928. In 1931, the New York City Board of Estimate was deciding which bus route franchises would be given to which private operators. Along with thirty other bus routes, the Q17 was tentatively assigned to the North Shore Bus Company, as part of Zone B (Flushing and Northern Queens).

The North Shore Bus Company acquired the franchises to the Flushing Heights Bus routes on September 22, 1935, but the two companies did not merge. As part of the transaction, North Shore expected to get the franchises for both the Q17 and Q25 from the city. North Shore was only allowed to keep the Q17 route, and as compensation, the city assured them of a new route between Flushing and Jamaica via Main Street. This route would go into service when a bridge was built to carry Main Street over the Grand Central Parkway in 1938; this route is today's Q44.

On July 1, 1939, the Q17 became interlined with the Q20, meaning that north of Flushing the bus would continue via the Q20 route to College Point. The service was designated "Q17-20" or "Q20-17" and rollsigns would display Q17/20. On December 16, 1940, the Q17-20 route's southern terminal was moved from the 165th Street Bus Terminal to the intersection of 168th Street and Jamaica Avenue, three blocks east. The route been running to the 165th Street Terminal since North Shore took the terminal over in mid-1939. Beginning on June 8, 1942, due to restrictions on gasoline and tire usage during World War II, the service was truncated to 14th Avenue and 122nd Street in College Point. Service north of 14th Avenue was restored on February 4, 1946. The Q20 was separated from the Q17 during off-peak "base period" hours on January 27, 1947. In March of that year, North Shore Bus would be taken over by the New York City Board of Transportation (later the New York City Transit Authority), making the bus routes city operated. The joint Q17-20 service later became popular among students of St. John's University, and residents from Jamaica Estates and Flushing Heights (now Kew Gardens Hills) shopping in Downtown Flushing.

On February 3, 1957, the Transit Authority separated the Q17 and Q20 services at all times. On December 19, 1960, the Flushing Heights Civic and Improvement Association requested that the NYCTA restore the former Q17-20 service.

=== 1980s to present ===
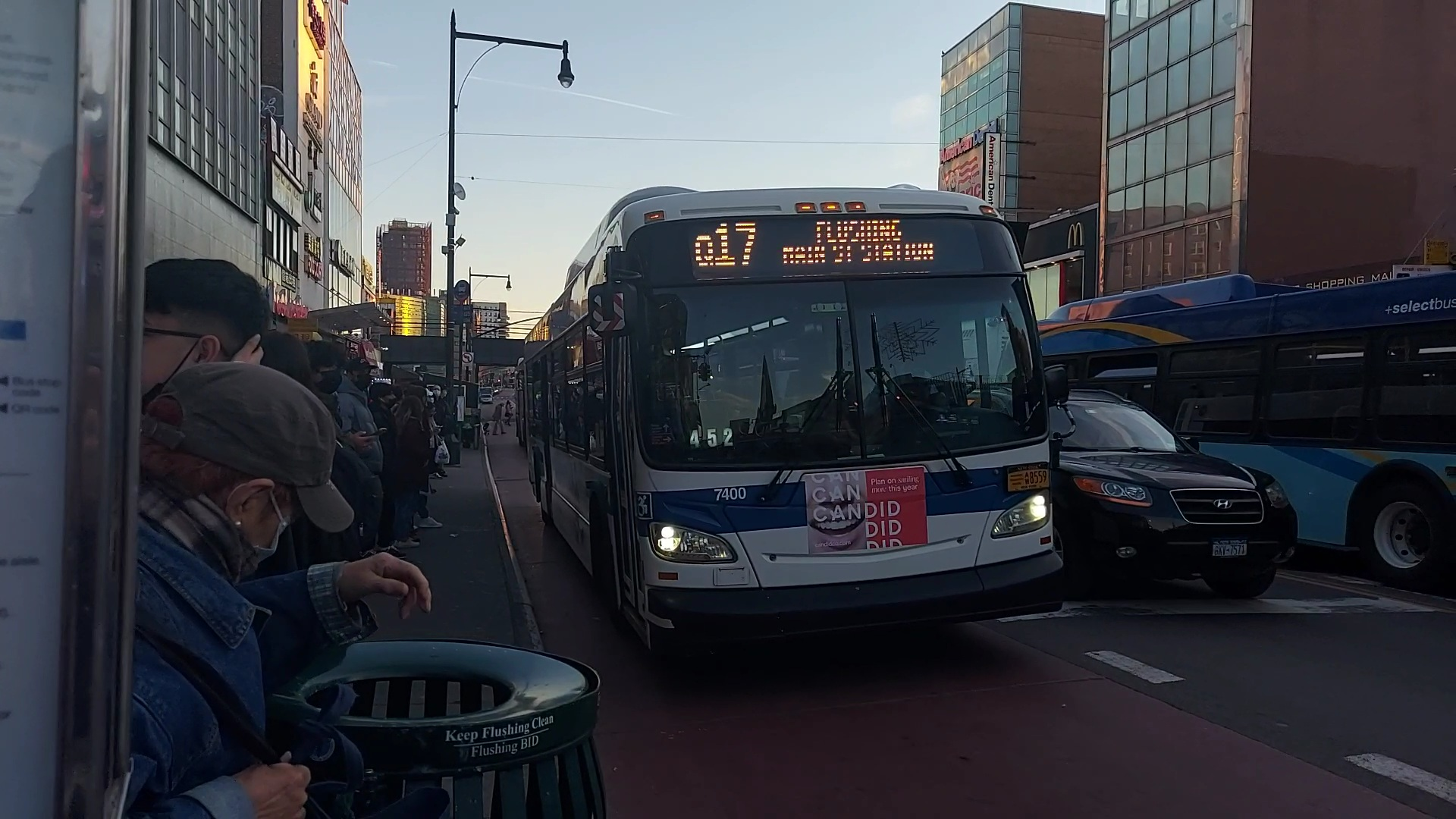
2015 NFI XD40 #7400 on the Q17 school tripper in December 2021

On December 11, 1988, when the Archer Avenue Line opened, the Q17's southern terminal was moved one block east and south to Archer Avenue and Merrick Boulevard. Limited-stop service during peak hours began on September 8, 2003. Limited-stop service was estimated to save riders traveling longer distances five minutes, and was provided by alternate Q17 trips. The locations of limited stops were made because they were in most case high volume transfer points, have high ridership and are spaced out to allow limited-stop service to run more quickly than local service. This change was announced in May 2003, and was presented to the NYC Transit Committee of the MTA Board on June 17, 2003. In August 2014, the northern layover area of the Q17 and Q27 was shifted from Prince Street west of Main Street near St. George's Church, to 39th Avenue and 138th Street east of Main Street.

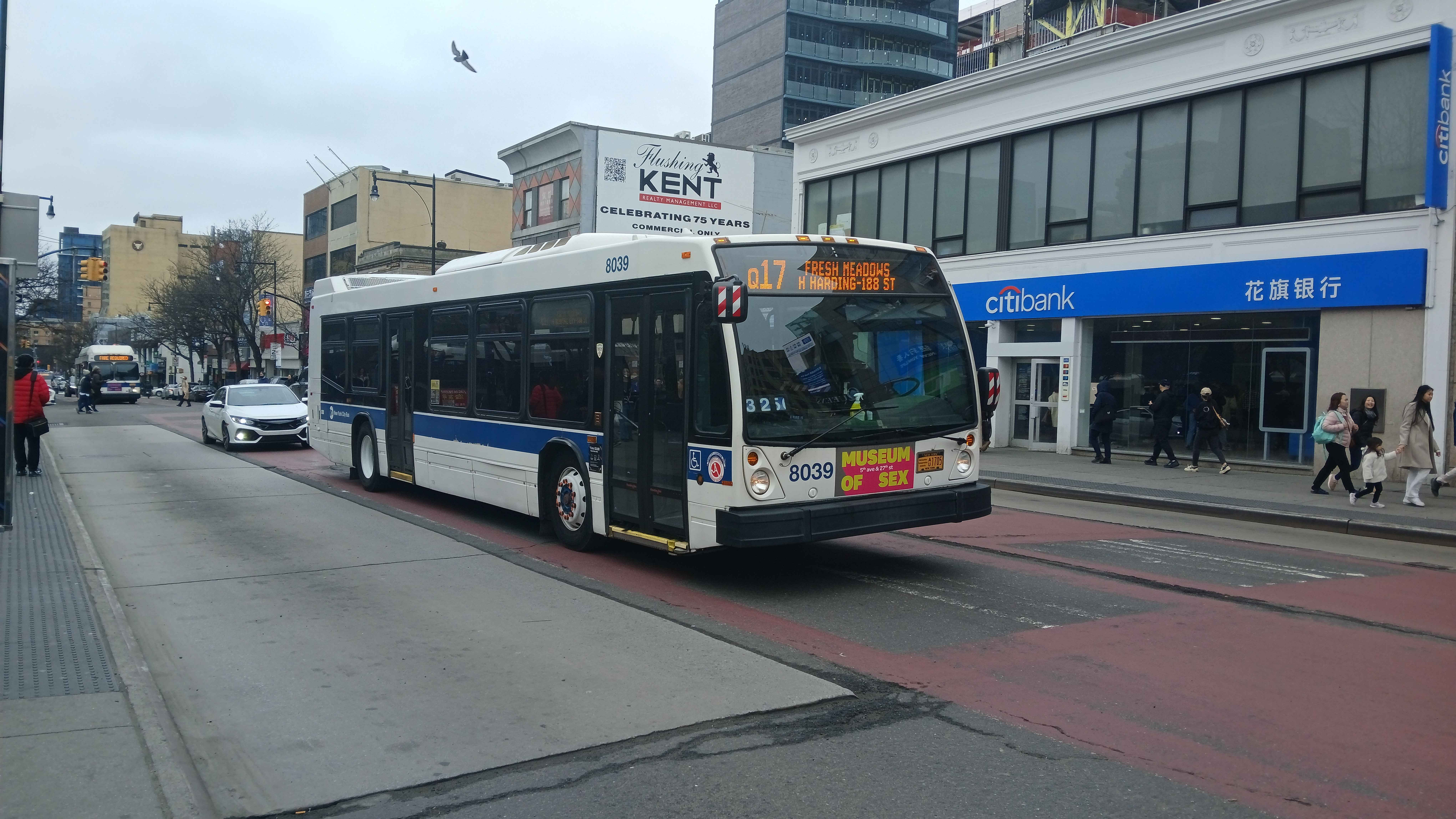
A 2011 Nova Bus LFS (8039) on the Q17 short turn, terminating at Horace Harding-188 St instead of completing the full route to Jamaica-Merrick Blvd.

=== Bus redesigns ===
In December 2019, the MTA released a draft redesign of the Queens bus network. As part of the redesign, the Q17 would have been eliminated, with several "intra-borough" routes providing service on the corridors used by the Q17. The redesign was delayed due to the COVID-19 pandemic in New York City in 2020, and the original draft plan was dropped due to negative feedback.

A revised plan was released in March 2022. Under the new plan, the Q17 would become a "zone" route, with nonstop sections on Kissena Boulevard. The route would be extended north to College Point, taking over the routing of the Q25. The southern terminus would be cut back to Union Turnpike in Fresh Meadows. Service between Jamaica and Union Turnpike would be provided by a new route, the Q75.

A final bus-redesign plan was released in December 2023. The Q17 would be converted into a limited-stop route with slightly fewer stops than the existing Q17 local service, but it would retain its full routing from Flushing to Jamaica.

On December 17, 2024, addendums to the final plan were released. Among these, stop changes were made to the Q17. On January 29, 2025, the current plan was approved by the MTA Board, and the Queens Bus Redesign went into effect in two different phases during Summer 2025. The sole Q17 route reverted from “Limited” to “Local” after the approval and is part of Phase I, which started on June 29, 2025; the weekday-only Q17 Limited ran its last trips on June 27, 2025.
