= Q74 =

Q74 may refer to:

- Q74 (New York City bus)
- Q74 (New York City bus, 1940–2010)
- Al-Muddaththir, a surah of the Quran
- French submarine Mariotte
