= Q74 (New York City bus, 1940–2010) =

Former bus route in Queens, New York

q74
- Queens College–Kew Gardens; Main Street–Vleigh Place

Overview
- System: MTA Regional Bus Operations
- Operator: New York City Transit Authority
- Garage: Casey Stengel Depot
- Began service: October 14, 1940
- Ended service: June 27, 2010

Route
- Locale: Queens, New York, U.S.
- Communities served: Kew Gardens Hills, Kew Gardens, Forest Hills
- Landmarks served: Queens Borough Hall, John Bowne High School, Townsend Harris High School, Queens College, Aaron Copland School of Music
- Start: Kew Gardens Hills – Kissena Boulevard & Melbourne Avenue / Queens College; Kew Gardens Hills – Horace Harding Expressway & 146th Street (short runs)
- Via: Horace Harding Expressway, Kissena Boulevard, Melbourne Avenue, Main Street, Vleigh Place, Union Turnpike
- End: Kew Gardens – Queens Boulevard & Union Turnpike / Union Turnpike station
- Timetable: Q74

The Q74 bus route constituted a public transit line in Queens, New York City. It ran primarily along Main Street, Vleigh Place, and Union Turnpike between Queens College and the Kew Gardens–Union Turnpike subway station. Operated by the North Shore Bus Company from 1940 to 1947, the route was later city operated by MTA Regional Bus Operations under the New York City Transit brand until June 27, 2010, when it was discontinued under system-wide service cuts.

== Route description and service ==
The Q74 began at the Kew Gardens–Union Turnpike station of the New York City Subway, and then ran via Union Turnpike before turning onto Vleigh Place and Main Street. It then made a clockwise loop around the Queens College campus via Main Street, Horace Harding Expressway, and Kissena Boulevard, before terminating at Kissena Boulevard and Melbourne Avenue at Gate 1 of Queens College. Kew Gardens-bound buses continued the loop, traveling west along Melbourne Avenue before turning south on Main Street towards Union Turnpike station. Q74 service only ran during weekdays between 6:00 AM and 11:00 PM.

== History ==
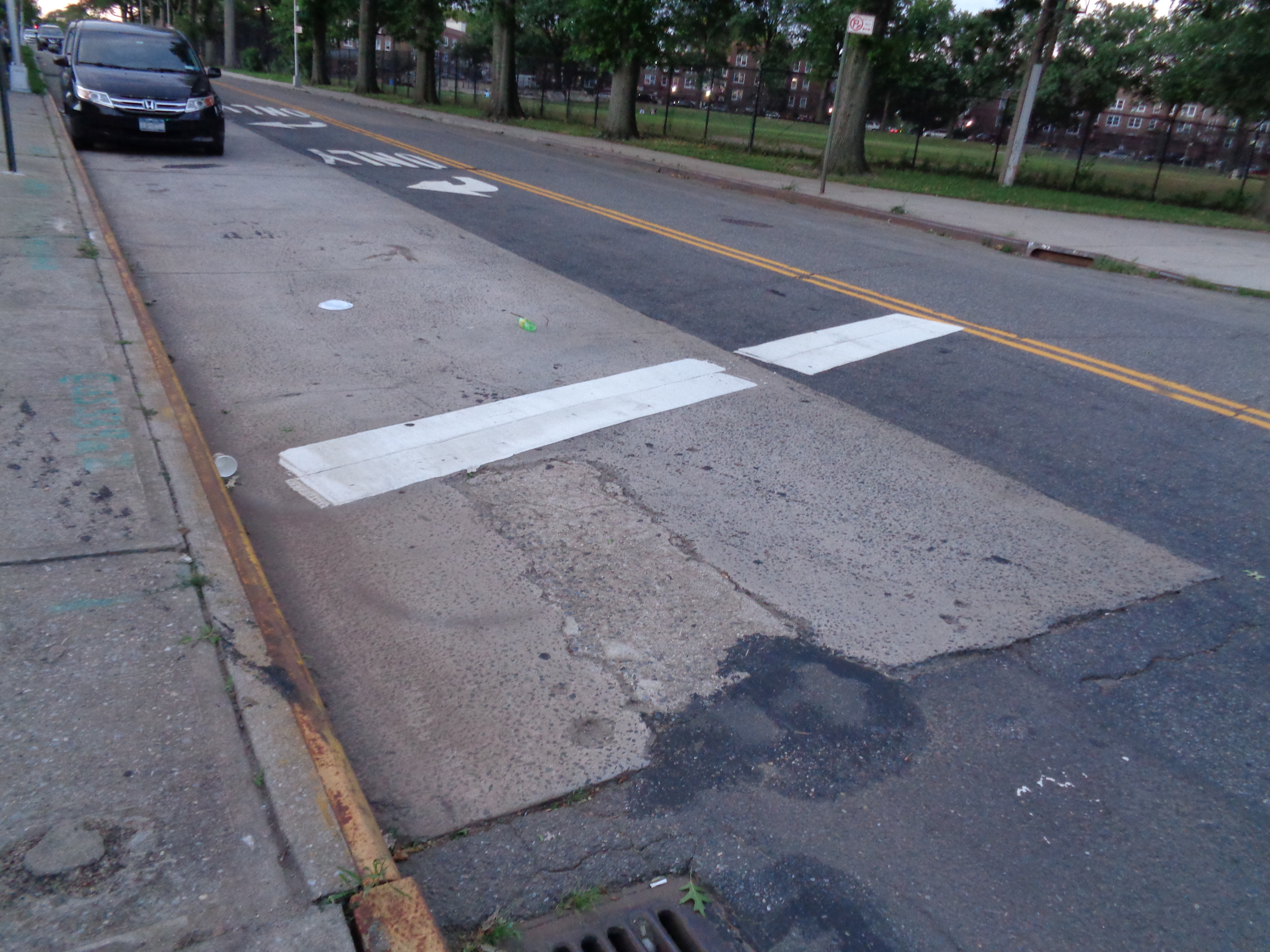
The former second-to-last stop on the Q74 route, at Vleigh Place and Union Turnpike.

What would become the Q74 began service on October 14, 1940, operated by the North Shore Bus Company between Queens Boulevard in Kew Gardens and Roosevelt Avenue in Flushing as a third branch of the Q44. On October 28, this service was combined with North Shore's Bronx–Flushing–World's Fair Line, running between Kew Gardens and West Farms, Bronx as the Q44. By December of that year the service was split; the Q44 Bronx–Flushing–Jamaica service (the main Q44 branch) ran between Jamaica and the Bronx, while the Q44 Kew Gardens/Vleigh Place service ran between Union Turnpike Station and Jewel Avenue in Kew Gardens Hills. It was variously known as the Vleigh Place Branch of the Q44, the Vleigh Place Shuttle, the Q44 shuttle, or the Q44A shuttle. By 1942, the Q44 Vleigh Place route was cut back to Jewel Avenue. On May 29, 1943, the Q44 Vleigh Place Branch was temporarily discontinued due to a gas shortage due to World War II. On May 20, 1946, the route was extended from Jewel Avenue to the Flushing–Main Street terminal at Roosevelt Avenue. The route was truncated back to Jewel Avenue on January 27, 1947. That year, North Shore Bus would be taken over by the New York City Board of Transportation (later the New York City Transit Authority), making the bus route city operated. Under city operation, the bus kept its existing route.

In November 1949, the Queens Valley Home Owners' Association of Kew Gardens Hills proposed an extension of the Q44 Vleigh Place shuttle bus west from its northern terminus at Jewel Avenue and Main Street to the 71st–Continental Avenues subway station of the IND Queens Boulevard Line in Forest Hills, to give Kew Gardens Hills additional bus service. It would have created a loop service between the 71st Avenue station and the Kew Gardens–Union Turnpike station of the same line, running via Main Street. The proposed route was numbered as the Q75. The proposal was submitted to the Board of Transportation on March 20, 1951. On June 19, transit officials informed the Board of Estimate it wouldn't be advisable to extend that route. In response, Queens–Nassau Transit (the predecessor to the Queens Surface Corporation) proposed a bus route to run along the entire length of Jewel Avenue between 164th Street to the 71st Avenue station at Queens Boulevard. In an alternate proposal, Queens–Nassau Transit proposed having the route terminate at the 75th Avenue subway station, in between the 71st Avenue and Union Turnpike stops. The Queens Valley Association opposed the Queens Transit proposal, due to it only serving the northern portion of Kew Gardens Hills. It also opposed the 75th Avenue terminus, as 75th Avenue is a local station. On November 14, 1951, this route (the Q65A; today's Q64) began service. A separate city-operated Q75 between Jamaica and Oakland Gardens began service in May 1952.

In March 1956, the terminal was shifted from the north side of Queens Boulevard to the south side of Queens Boulevard to alleviate congestion. In May 1956, it was proposed to expand service to operate on Sunday and holidays. Later (likely in 1957) the Vleigh Place shuttle was renamed the Q44VP, "VP" standing for Vleigh Place.

In 1961, the Queens Valley Home Owners' Association petitioned for an extension of the Q44VP north to Melbourne Avenue at the Queens College campus. By the 1970s, the Q44VP route was extended to Queens College. On April 15, 1990, the Q44VP was renamed the Q74. By the end of 1990, the Q74 was only carrying 240 passengers per weekday, and the New York City Transit Authority was considering discontinuing the route.

The last Q74 bus ran on June 25, 2010. It was the busiest route in Queens to be eliminated under the service cuts, having served around 2,100 weekly riders and nearly 475,000 annual riders.

== See also ==
- Main Street buses
- Q46 (New York City bus)
- Q64 and QM4 buses
