= Q20 and Q44 buses =

Bus routes in New York City

q20 q44
- Main Street Lines
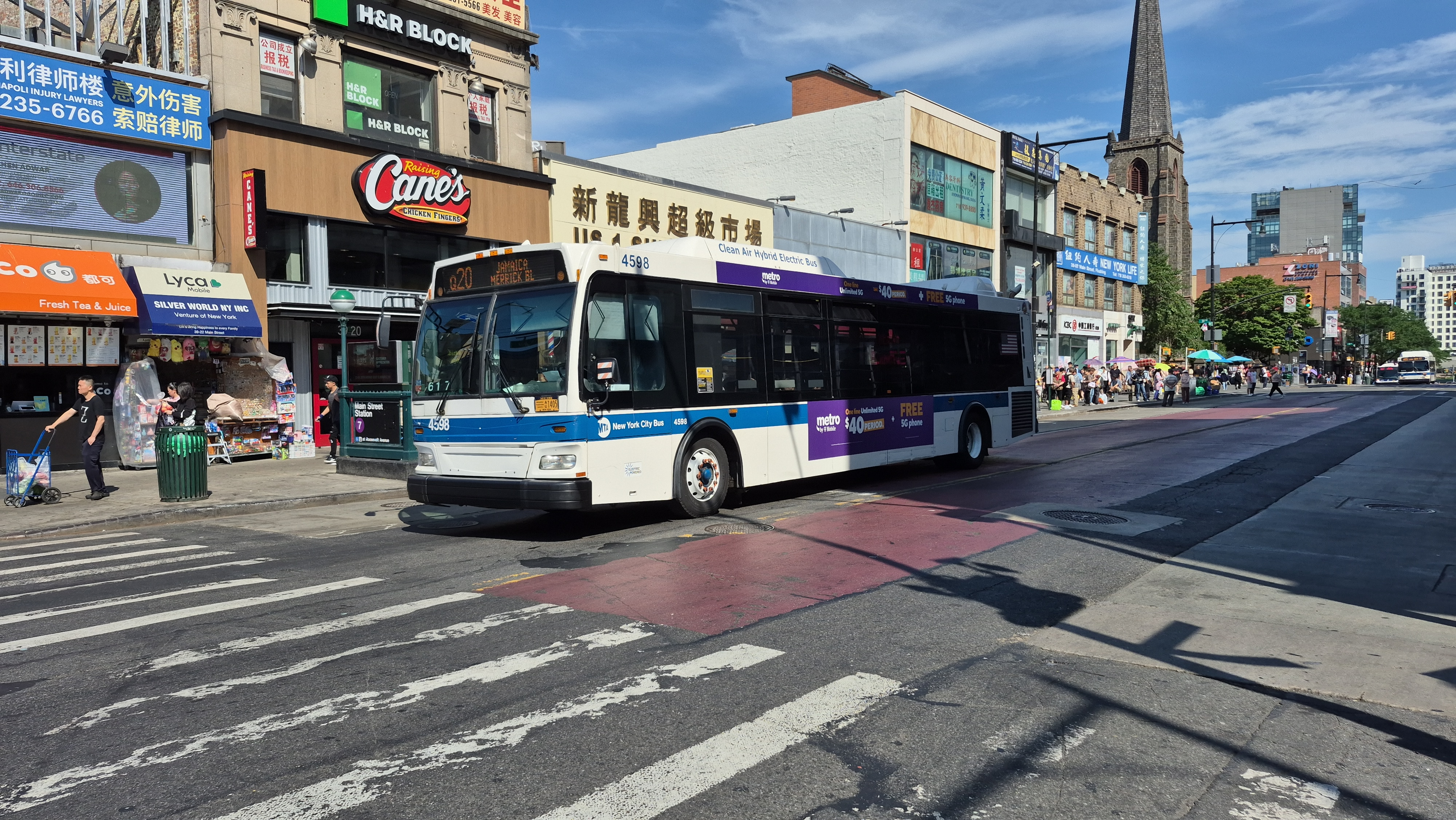
- An Orion VII NG #4598 on the Q20 and a New Flyer XD60 #6017 on the Q44, both buses are bound for Jamaica

Overview
- System: MTA Regional Bus Operations
- Operator: New York City Transit Authority
- Garage: Casey Stengel Depot
- Vehicle: Q20: Orion VII NG HEV; New Flyer Xcelsior XD40; Nova Bus LFS; Q44: New Flyer Xcelsior XD60 (and Q20 vehicles for supplemental service)
- Livery: Select Q44 SBS buses only: Select Bus Service
- Began service: 1932 (Whitestone Branch service); 1937 (Q20 Flushing-College Point service); 1938 (Q44 Flushing-Jamaica service); 1940 (Q44 Bronx-Jamaica service); 1999 (Q44 limited-stop service; Q20A/B College Point-Jamaica service); 2015 (Q44 SBS)

Route
- Locale: Queens and The Bronx, New York, U.S.
- Communities served: Queens: Jamaica, Briarwood, Kew Gardens Hills, Queensboro Hill, Flushing, Whitestone, College Point; The Bronx (Q44): Throggs Neck, Unionport, Parkchester, West Farms, Bronx Park
- Start: Jamaica, Queens – Merrick Boulevard
- Via: Main Street, Union Street, Parsons Boulevard; Q44 (The Bronx): East 177th Street
- End: Q20: College Point – College Point Boulevard & 15th Avenue; Q44: Bronx Zoo/West Farms Square – East 180th Street
- Length: Q20: 9.8 miles (15.8 km); Q44: 13.9 miles (22.4 km)

Service
- Operates: 24 hours
- Annual patronage: Q20: 3,300,612 (2025); Q44: 4,834,620 (2025)
- Transfers: Yes
- Timetable: Q20; Q44 SBS

The Q20 and Q44 bus routes constitute the Main Street Line, a public transit line in Queens, New York City, United States. It runs primarily along Main Street between two major bus-subway hubs in the neighborhoods of Jamaica and Flushing. The Q20 terminates in College Point at the north end of Queens. The Q44 continues north into the borough of the Bronx, terminating in the West Farms neighborhood near the Bronx Zoo. The Q44 is one of two Queens bus routes to operate between the two boroughs (along with the Q50).

The Q44 and Q20 were originally operated by the North Shore Bus Company from the 1930s to 1947; they are now operated by MTA Regional Bus Operations under the New York City Transit brand. In June 1999, the Q44 began limited stop service in Queens, with the Q20 split into two branches, the Q20A and Q20B to provide local service. On November 29, 2015, the Q44 was converted into a Select Bus Service (SBS) route. On June 29, 2025, the Q20B branch was discontinued, and the Q20A branch was renamed back to Q20.

== Route description and service ==
=== Q44 ===
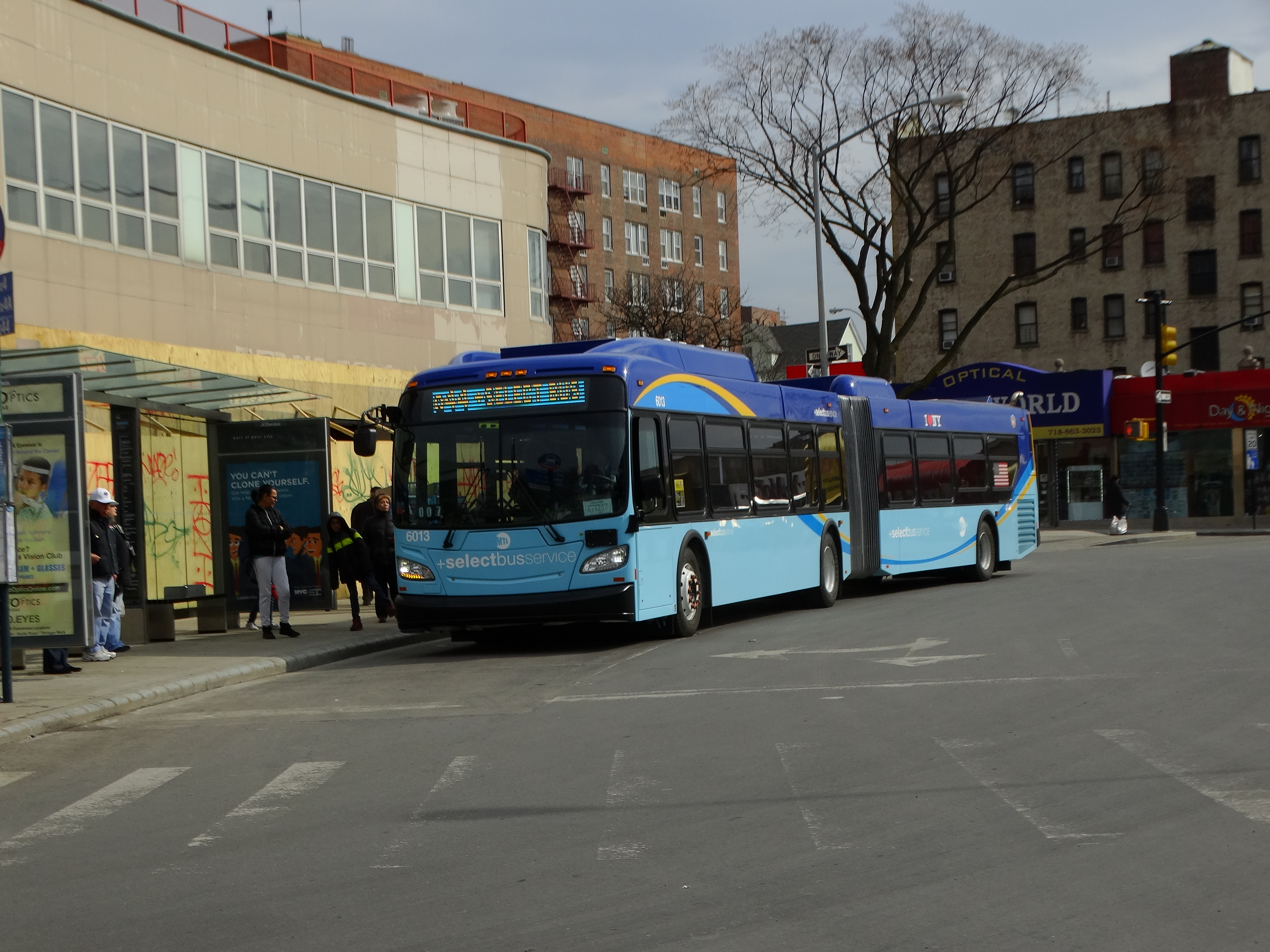
A 2016 New Flyer XD60 (6013) on the Q44 SBS at Hugh Grant Circle/Westchester Avenue near Parkchester station in the Bronx

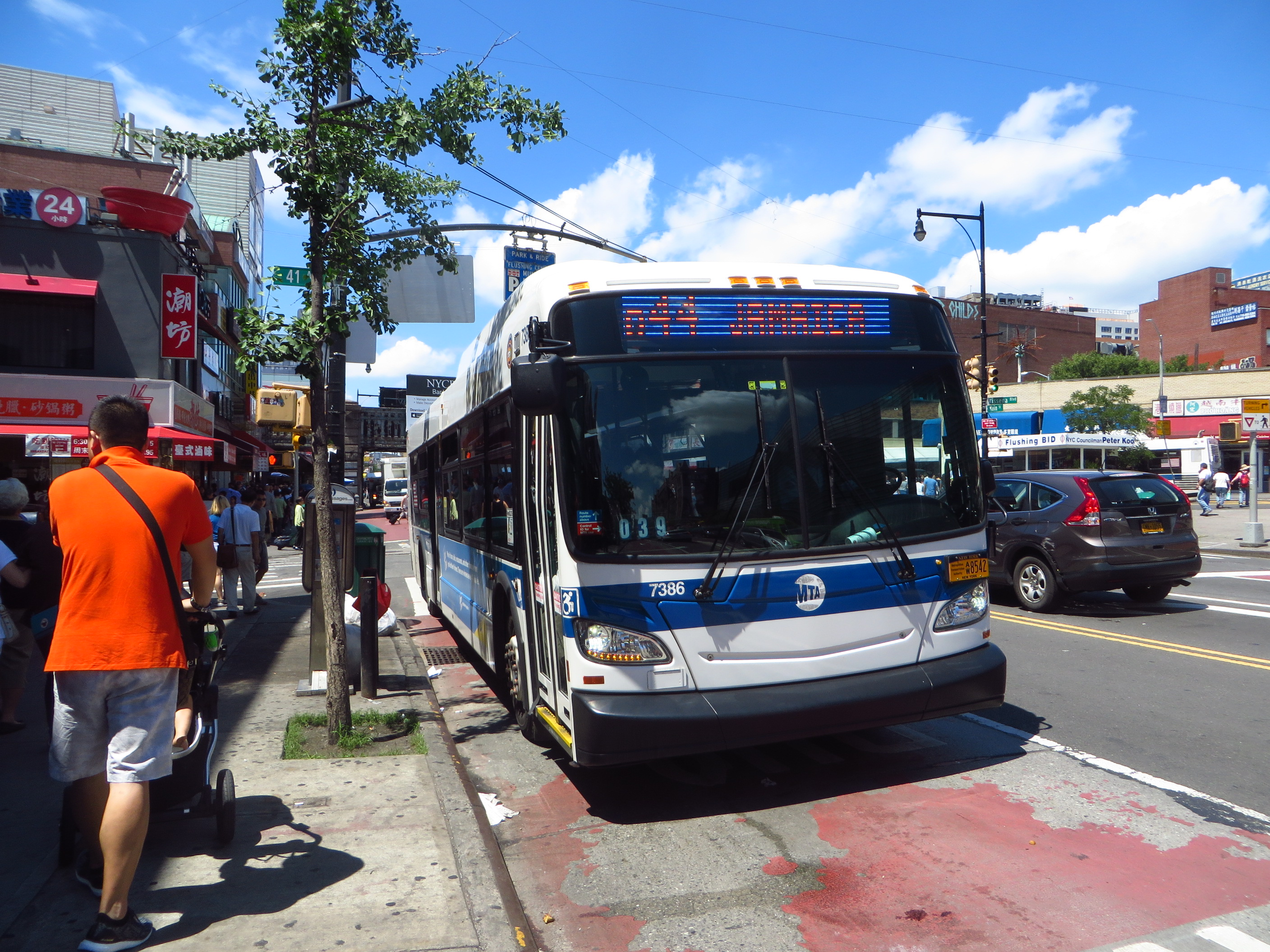
A 2015 XD40 (7386) on the Jamaica-bound Q44 SBS used as a supplement to the normal articulated fleet

The current Q44 route begins at the intersection of Merrick Boulevard and Archer Avenue in Downtown Jamaica, Queens (or Jamaica Center), just south of the 165th Street Bus Terminal. This terminus is shared with the Q17. Traveling west along Archer Avenue, it passes the Jamaica Center station of the Archer Avenue subway and its bus terminal. At the Sutphin Boulevard subway station, which connects to the Jamaica station of the Long Island Rail Road and AirTrain JFK, the route turns north onto Sutphin Boulevard. It then turns west onto Hillside Avenue and north onto Queens Boulevard, interchanging with two stations of the IND Queens Boulevard Line.

At Main Street, the Q44 turns north, running the entire distance of the street between Queens Boulevard and Northern Boulevard in Downtown Flushing (also known as Flushing Chinatown). In Downtown Flushing is the Flushing–Main Street terminal, where several bus lines, the IRT Flushing Line subway, and the LIRR Port Washington Branch interchange. The Q44 shifts onto Union Street and Parsons Boulevard to 14th Avenue in Whitestone. It then enters the Bronx–Whitestone Bridge, sharing the bridge with the Q50. Throughout Queens, the Q44 provides limited-stop service, making intermittent stops primarily at major intersections and points of interest.

After entering the Bronx, the Q44 and Q50 follow the Hutchinson River Parkway service road to just south of the Bruckner Interchange, making only two stops: one at Lafayette Avenue, and another one at Brush Avenue and Bruckner Blvd, where passengers can also connect to the Bx5 bus. While the Q50 turns east to follow the Bx5, the Q44 turns west onto East 177th Street (the Cross Bronx Expressway service road), running along either direction of the road. At the Parkchester subway station, the Q44 goes around the Hugh J. Grant Circle. The Q44 continues along East 177th Street until the interchange with the Sheridan Expressway, where it turns north onto Devoe Avenue. The Q44 stops at East Tremont Avenue near the West Farms Square subway station, and terminates at East 180th Street at the southern boundary of the Bronx Zoo. Buses lay over on a bridge over the Bronx River, before reentering service on Boston Road. Although the Q44's northern terminal is signed as "Bronx Zoo" (formerly "Bronx Zoo − West Farms Square"), the zoo is not accessible from this location; the closest entrance is several blocks north at Bronx Park South and Boston Road. During the A.M. rush, some northbound Q44 buses originate or terminate at the Flushing-Main Street station, or terminate at 14th Avenue in Whitestone.

Prior to 1999, the Q44 ran entirely local between Jamaica, Queens and West Farms, Bronx. It was the only bus service along Main Street in Queens. Before the implementation of Select Bus Service in November 2015, the route ran entirely local along East 177th Street. Some closely-spaced stops were removed with the implementation of Select Bus Service.

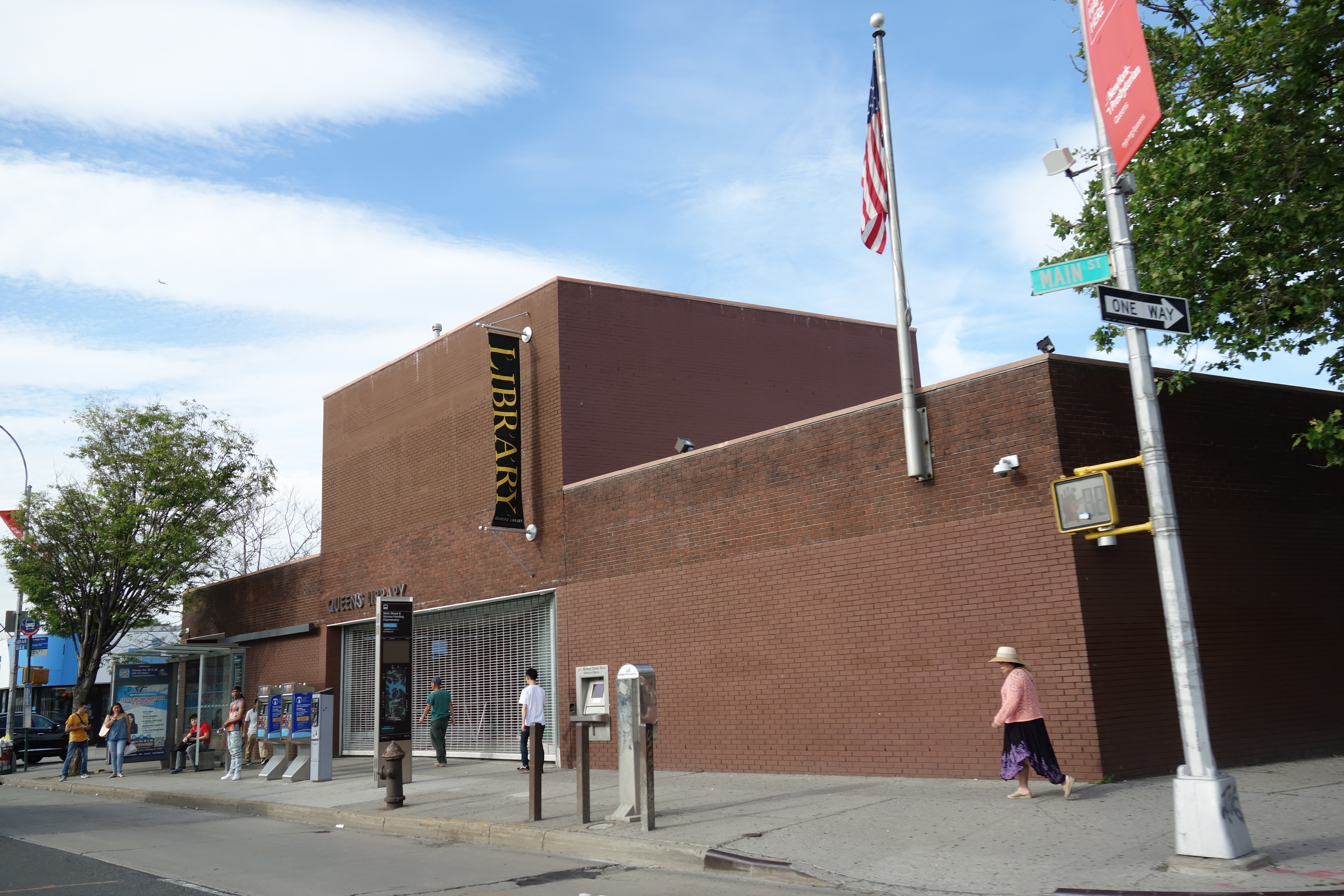
A Q20/44 bus stop at Queensboro Hill Library

==== Select Bus Service stops ====
Station Street traveled	Direction	Connections
The Bronx
East 180th Street / Devoe Avenue Bronx Zoo	Northern terminus	NYC Bus: Bx9, Bx40, Bx42
Boston Road / East 180th Street	Southbound station	NYC Bus: Bx9, Bx40, Bx42
East Tremont Avenue / East 177th Street	Southbound	NYC Bus: Bx9, Bx21, Bx36; NYC Subway: trains at West Farms Square–East Tremont Avenue
Devoe Av / Wyatt Street	Northbound	NYC Bus: Bx9, Bx21, Bx36; NYC Subway: trains at West Farms Square–East Tremont Avenue
Rosedale / Commonwealth Avenues (East 177th Street/Cross Bronx Expressway)	Bidirectional	NYC Bus: Bx11
Beach Avenue (East 177th Street/Cross Bronx Expressway)	Southbound	NYC Bus: Bx11
Taylor Avenue (East 177th Street/Cross Bronx Expressway)	Northbound	NYC Bus: Bx11
Westchester / Virginia Avenues Hugh J. Grant Circle	Southbound	NYC Bus: Bx4, Bx4A, Bx11, Bx36, Bx39; MTA Bus: BxM6; NYC Subway: trains at Parkchester
Metropolitan Avenue Hugh J. Grant Circle	Northbound	NYC Bus: Bx4, Bx4A, Bx11, Bx36, Bx39; MTA Bus: BxM6; NYC Subway: trains at Parkchester
Newbold Avenue (East 177th Street/Cross Bronx Expressway)	Northbound	
Pugsley Avenue (East 177th Street/Cross Bronx Expressway)	Southbound	
Haviland Avenue (East 177th Street/Cross Bronx Expressway)	Northbound	NYC Bus: Bx22 at Castle Hill Avenue
Castle Hill Avenue (East 177th Street/Cross Bronx Expressway)	Southbound	NYC Bus: Bx22
Zerega Avenue (East 177th Street/Cross Bronx Expressway)	Northbound	Note: This northbound Bronx bus stop is for MTA employees only to access the Zerega Training and Maintenance Facility.
Brush Avenue (Bruckner Boulevard)	Bidirectional	NYC Bus: Bx5; MTA Bus: Q50
Lafayette Avenue (Hutchinson River Parkway)	Bidirectional	MTA Bus: Q50
Bronx–Whitestone Bridge
Queens
14th Avenue (Parsons Boulevard)	Bidirectional	NYC Bus: Q76; MTA Bus: QM2, QM32
20th Avenue (Parsons Boulevard)	Bidirectional	NYC Bus: Q20; MTA Bus: QM2, QM32
26th Avenue (Union Street)	Bidirectional	NYC Bus: Q20, Q61; MTA Bus: QM2, QM20, QM32
31st Road / Bayside Avenue (Union Street)	Bidirectional	NYC Bus: Q20, Q16, Q61
35th Avenue (Union Street)	Bidirectional	NYC Bus: Q17, Q20, Q27; MTA Bus: Q25, Q50
38th / 39th Avenues (Main Street)	Bidirectional	NYC Bus: Q12, Q13, Q15, Q16, Q17, Q20, Q27, Q58, Q61, Q90, Q98; MTA Bus: Q19, Q25, Q26, Q28, Q50, Q63, Q65, Q66 NICE Bus: n20G, n20x NYC Subway: trains at Flushing–Main Street; Note: The northbound stop at 38th Avenue is for pick-ups only, while the northbound stop at 39th Avenue is for drop-offs only.
41st Avenue / Kissena Boulevard (Main Street)	Bidirectional	NYC Bus: Q17, Q20, Q27, Q58, Q98; MTA Bus: Q25, Q26, Q65; NICE Bus: n20G, n20X; LIRR: Port Washington Branch at Flushing–Main Street
Elder Avenue Queens Botanical Garden (Main Street)	Bidirectional	NYC Bus: Q20
Booth Memorial Avenue NewYork–Presbyterian/Queens (Main Street)	Bidirectional	NYC Bus: Q20
Horace Harding Expressway / 60th Avenue (Main Street)	Bidirectional	NYC Bus: Q20, Q88
146th Street / 63rd Avenue Queens College (Main Street)	Bidirectional	NYC Bus: Q20
Melbourne Avenue Queens College (Main Street)	Bidirectional	NYC Bus: Q20
Jewel Avenue (Main Street)	Bidirectional	NYC Bus: Q20; MTA Bus: Q64, Q74, QM4, QM44
73rd Avenue (Main Street)	Bidirectional	NYC Bus: Q20
Union Turnpike (Main Street)	Bidirectional	NYC Bus: Q20, Q45, Q46, Q48; MTA Bus: QM1, QM5, QM6, QM7, QM8, QM31, QM35, QM36
139th Street Archbishop Molloy High School (Main Street)	Southbound	NYC Bus: Q20
Queens Boulevard / Manton Street (Main Street)	Bidirectional	NYC Bus: Q20, QM63, QM64, QM68; MTA Bus: Q60, QM21; NYC Subway: trains at Briarwood; Note: Bronx-bound buses stop at Main Street and Manton Street; Jamaica-bound buses stop at Queens Boulevard and 84th Drive near Main Street.
Hillside Avenue (Sutphin Boulevard)	Bidirectional	NYC Bus: Q1, Q43, QM68; NYC Subway: train at Sutphin Boulevard
Jamaica Avenue (Sutphin Boulevard)	Bidirectional	NYC Bus: Q1, Q20, Q24, Q30, Q31, Q43, Q54, Q56, Q75 (Q30, Q31, Q75 westbound only); MTA Bus: Q6, Q8, Q9, Q25, Q40, Q41, Q60, Q65
Sutphin Boulevard (Archer Avenue)	Bidirectional	NYC Bus: Q1, Q20, Q24, Q30, Q31, Q43, Q44, Q54, Q56, Q75 (Q24, Q30, Q31, Q75 eastbound only); MTA Bus: Q6, Q8, Q9, Q25, Q40, Q41, Q60, Q65; NYC Subway: trains at Sutphin Boulevard–Archer Avenue–JFK Airport; LIRR / AirTrain JFK: Jamaica
153rd / 158th Streets Jamaica Center Bus Terminal (Archer Avenue)	Bidirectional	NYC Bus: Q4, Q5, Q20, Q24, Q30, Q31, Q42, Q54, Q56, Q83, Q84, Q85, Q86, Q87, Q89, Q75; MTA Bus: Q6, Q8, Q9, Q25, Q41, Q65, Q110, Q111, Q112, Q113, Q114, Q115; NICE Bus: n4, n4X; NYC Subway: trains at Jamaica Center–York College
Merrick Boulevard (Archer Avenue)	Southern terminus, northbound station	NYC Bus: Q4, Q5, Q17, Q20, Q30, Q31, Q84, Q85, Q86, Q87, Q89, Q75; NICE Bus: n4 At 168th Street Bus Terminal: NYC Bus: Q1, Q2, Q3, Q17, Q30, Q31, Q36, Q75, Q76, Q77, Q82; MTA Bus: Q6, Q8, Q9, Q41; NICE Bus: n1, n6, n22, n24, n26

=== Q20 ===
NFI XD40 #7427 on the Q20 to Jamaica, sign incorrectly displays “College Point”

The Q20 shares the mostly same routing as the Q44 between Jamaica and Whitestone — except in Jamaica, where it takes Jamaica Avenue, before diverging west towards its terminal in College Point near Flushing Bay. The Q20 branches off at 20th Avenue, running along the northern edge of the former Flushing Airport and serving a large shopping center. Prior to 2025, this was labeled the Q20A to distinguish from the former Q20B, which turned west farther north at 14th Avenue, running through a much more residential area. The Q20 provides local service, running at all times.

=== School trippers ===
When school is in session, several buses originate near John Bowne High School at the northwest corner of Queens College and depart between 1:23 and 3:06pm. The first Q44 trip departs at 2:09pm. All southbound trips run the full route to Jamaica. For northbound trips, only two Q20 departures at 2:56 and 3pm run the full route to College Point; the rest terminate at the Flushing–Main Street station, along with all Q44 trips.

From Melbourne Avenue near the southwest corner of Queens College, one Q44 bus departs at 3:20pm and terminates in Flushing, while two Q20 buses depart at 4:05pm and operate the full route in each direction. The Q44 also serves Monsignor Scanlan High School, where one trip to the Bronx Zoo departs at 2:40pm.

== History ==
=== Original route ===
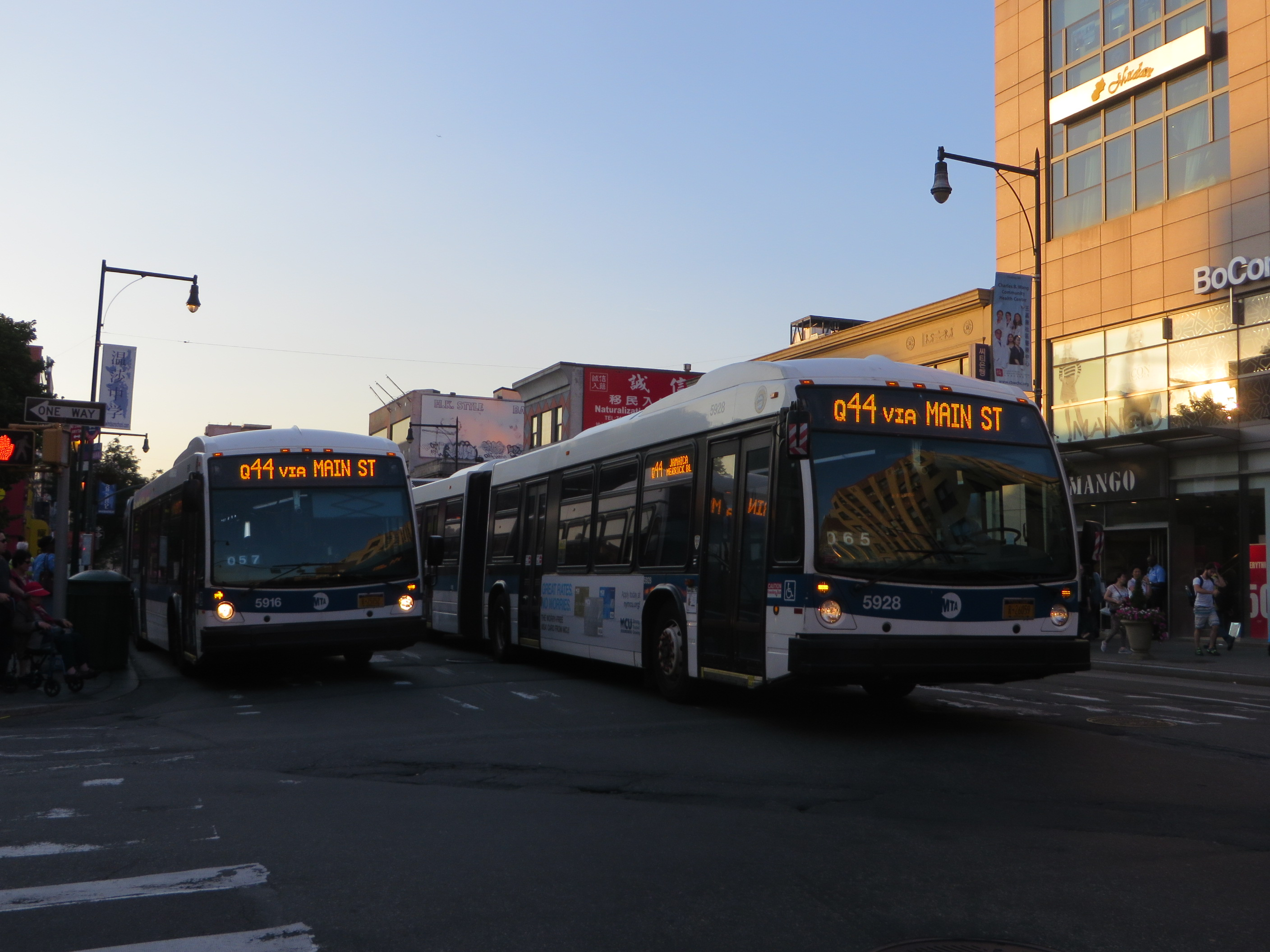
Two 2012 Nova Bus LFSs (5916 & 5928) in Flushing, Queens in July 2015, five months before implementation of Select Bus Service

On February 15, 1932, North Shore Bus Company began operating a bus service to replace the Long Island Rail Road's Whitestone Branch. This service was labeled the "Q35". This service was different from the current Q35 service between Brooklyn and Rockaway Park. It ran from the Flushing–Main Street terminal, north along Linden Street (now Linden Place) and 127th Street to 14th Avenue through Flushing and College Point. This is the routing of the current Q25 bus in the area. The original Q35 then ran east along 14th Avenue before following the current Q76 and Q15 routes to Whitestone.

On May 2, 1933, North Shore Bus began a shuttle service along Main Street between Main Street/Roosevelt Avenue subway station in Flushing and Horace Harding Boulevard (now the Long Island Expressway) in Queensboro Hill. This was the predecessor to Q44 service. At the time, Main Street had yet to be extended south past Reeves Avenue (the north end of modern Queens College).

On September 22, 1935, the North Shore Bus Company acquired, but did not merge with, the Flushing Heights Bus Corporation which operated the Q17 and the Q25 services between Jamaica and Flushing. North Shore only acquired the Q25 on a temporary basis; as compensation, the city assured the company that they would get a new route between Flushing and Jamaica via Main Street. This was planned to go into service after the extension of Main Street, including a bridge over the Grand Central Parkway, was completed. In 1937, several major bus route changes occurred. Queens–Nassau Transit took over the Q25 service and combined it with their Q34 route along Linden Place and 127th Street in College Point (predecessor to the northern portion of the current Q25). The Q35 was discontinued by North Shore, and was replaced by a new Q20 service. The route of the Q20 was the same as the current route of the Q20B (via 14th Avenue), except that it continued north along 122nd Street (now College Point Boulevard) and followed the same looping route as the current Q25 (then Q34) near MacNeil Park at the north end of the borough.

=== Start of Q44 service ===
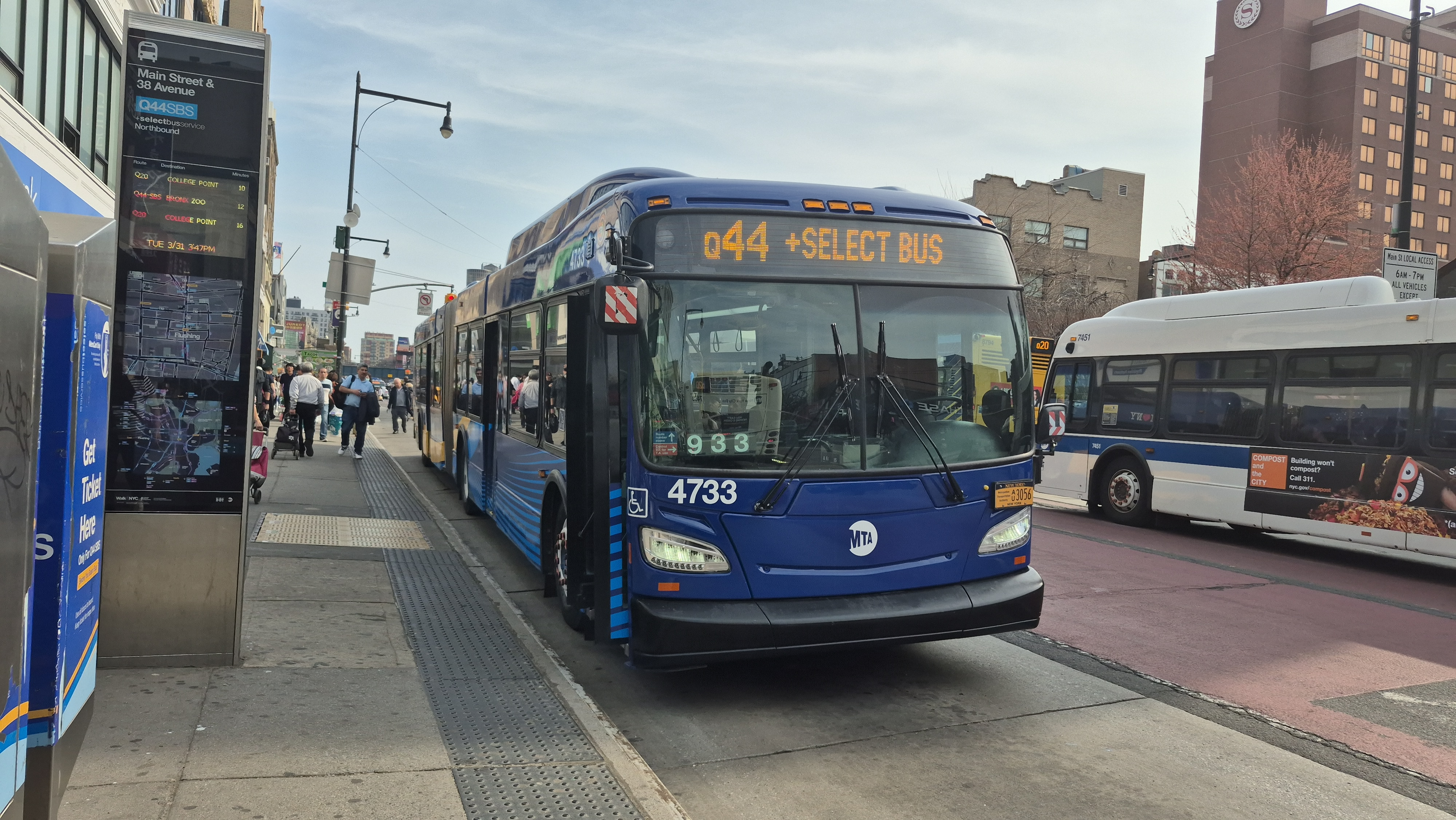
2012 NFI XD60 #4733 on the Q44-SBS.

In December 1936, North Shore applied for a franchise on route "Q-44" between Flushing and Jamaica via Main Street. On March 22, 1938, Q44 service began between Flushing–Main Street and Archer Avenue at Long Island Rail Road's Jamaica station, when Main Street was extended south to the Grand Central Parkway. The company advertised the route as the shortest "from the entire North Shore" of Queens to Jamaica, running 15 minutes between terminals. Following the opening of the Bronx–Whitestone Bridge in April 1939, North Shore began operating bus service between West Farms Square in the Bronx and the 1939 New York World's Fair in Flushing Meadows–Corona Park on July 1 of that year. On October 28, 1940, this route was combined with the Q44, running from Kew Gardens–Union Turnpike station (along the route that would become the Q74) through Whitestone and along East 177th Street in the Bronx to Tremont Avenue and Boston Road at West Farms Square. An alternate branch ran to Westchester Square, Bronx. By December of that year, the Q44 returned to Jamaica, running to the 165th Street Bus Terminal.

On July 1, 1939, the Q20 became interlined with the Q17, meaning that south of Flushing the bus would continue via the Q17 route to the Jamaica−165th Street terminal. The service was designated "Q17-20" or "Q20-17" and rollsigns would display Q17/20. Beginning on June 8, 1942, due to restrictions on gasoline and tire usage during World War II, the service was truncated to 14th Avenue and 122nd Street in College Point. Service north of 14th Avenue was restored on February 4, 1946. The Q20 was separated from the Q17 during off-peak "base period" hours on January 27, 1947. In March of that year, North Shore Bus would be taken over by the New York City Board of Transportation (later the New York City Transit Authority [NYCTA]), making the bus routes city operated. The joint Q17-20 service later became popular among students of St. John's University, and residents from Jamaica Estates and Flushing Heights (now Kew Gardens Hills) shopping in Downtown Flushing.

On February 3, 1957, the NYCTA separated the Q17 and Q20 services at all times, eliminated service north of 14th Avenue and 122nd Street (College Point Boulevard), and renamed the Q20 the Q44FS (Flushing Shuttle). It was one of several routes using the "Q44" designation including the Q44 itself, the Q44A (now the Q46), the Q44B (a shuttle to Malba, Queens which has since been discontinued), and the Q44VP (later the Q74).

During the 1964 New York World's Fair, special Q44 service was inaugurated, running to the Rodman Street entrance of Flushing Meadows Park. The routes, designated "Q44 WF" and marked "World's Fair", originated from either West Farms Square or 165th Street and made stops on the Bronx or Queens portions of the route respectively before terminating at the fair.

On July 11, 1966, the NYCTA moved the terminals of the Q13, Q14, Q16, Q28, and Q44FS from downtown Flushing to the Flushing Parking Field surrounded by 37th Avenue, Union Street, 138th Street, and 39th Avenue on a six-month pilot basis. The change, which was made at the request of multiple Queens elected officials, was intended to provide shelter for riders and reduce downtown congestion. However, due to immediate opposition from shoppers, who complained that the change forced them to walk four blocks to get from the subway to the buses, businessmen, and elected officials, on July 20, 1966, the NYCTA announced that it would undo the change on July 24. Q13, Q16, and Q28 service would go back to terminating on the north side of Roosevelt Avenue to the east of Main Street, while Q14 and Q44FS service would resume terminating on the east side of Main Street at 39th Avenue. Queens Borough President Mario Cariello had sent a letter to the NYCTA asking for the change in service to be reversed on July 18. The NYCTA had made the change in service at his request in April. Cariello noted that many of his constituents had requested the change.

In December 1967, the NYCTA transmitted a proposed extension of the Q44 by 4.33 miles (6.97 km) to serve Co-Op City and to make a minor change at the western terminal of the route due to the conversion of some streets to one-way to the Board of Estimate. In October 1969, the General Superintendent of the NYCTA recommended modifying the route of the Q44 in the Bronx to eliminate its use of streets deemed to be "inadequate for bus passage." The route would be modified to run along East Tremont Avenue between Boston Road and Bryant Avenue, Bryant Avenue between Boston Road and East Tremont Avenue, and Boston Road between Bryant Avenue and East Tremont Avenue.

=== Reroutes and institution of limited-stop service ===
On April 15, 1990, the Q44FS was renumbered to Q20; at this time 20th Avenue service began, when the street was widened and the shopping center was constructed. In September 1995, the Metropolitan Transportation Authority (MTA) eliminated weekend service on the Q20, making it a weekday-only service. On January 11, 1998, the Q44 began running on Archer Avenue between Merrick Boulevard and Sutphin Boulevard in both directions to provide direct access to the Long Island Rail Road's Jamaica station and to eliminate difficult turns on congested streets. A new turnaround loop was set up using Archer Avenue, 168th Street, Jamaica Avenue, and Merrick Boulevard. Previously, southbound buses ran along Jamaica Avenue until Merrick Boulevard, and northbound buses ran along Archer Avenue and 153rd Street until they turned onto Jamaica Avenue. This change was presented to the MTA Board for approval in November 1997, and was initially going to take effect in December 1997.

On June 27, 1999, the Q44 began limited-stop service in Queens, with the Q20 split into two branches (Q20A and Q20B) to provide local service, with the Q20B providing service along the old Q20 route on 14th Avenue, and the Q20A providing new service along 20th Avenue. The addition of service along 20th Avenue was done at the request of owners of commercial developments on the avenue, such as BJ's and Target. Weekend service was also restored on the Q20A. Since the Q44 became limited, the Q20 was extended south along Main Street to make local stops. Prior to the change, Q20 service had run during weekdays only from 5 a.m. to 11 p.m. at frequencies of 15 to 30 minutes. At this time, the Q44 was shifted from its historical route in the neighborhood of Briarwood between Union Turnpike and Hillside Avenue. It had previously turned east onto the Grand Central Parkway service road and then turned south onto 150th Street towards Jamaica, the same route employed since 1938 when Main Street dead-ended at the Grand Central service road. It was rerouted to continue south via Main Street, and then via Queens Boulevard to Hillside Avenue. Initially, Q44 buses made limited stops from 6 a.m. to 10 p.m. on weekdays, from 7 a.m. to 10 p.m. on Saturdays, and from 8 a.m. to 10 p.m. on Sundays. The changes in service on the Q44 and Q20 were made to increase ridership growth and to serve new markets. On July 29, 1999, a meeting was held at Borough Hall, with officials of the MTA in attendance, to discuss the changes. Many riders spoke against the changes, noting that the change made it harder for senior citizens and people with disabilities who had used the stops along 150th Street, and that the change added an additional transfer to complete their trips, requiring an additional fare. A spokesperson for the MTA said that it had no plans to revert the change in service, and noted that the areas on Queens Boulevard and Main Street that the Q44 was rerouted to had increased in density. Briarwood residents had organized and circulated a petition in opposition to the loss of bus service on 150th Street soon after the changes took effect. This change was announced to elected officials in late March 1999, and was approved by the MTA Board on April 15, 1999.

On April 1, 2005, Q44 limited-stop service at Main Street and Sanford Avenue was discontinued, with service continuing to be provided by the Q20A and Q20B.

=== Select Bus Service and service expansion ===
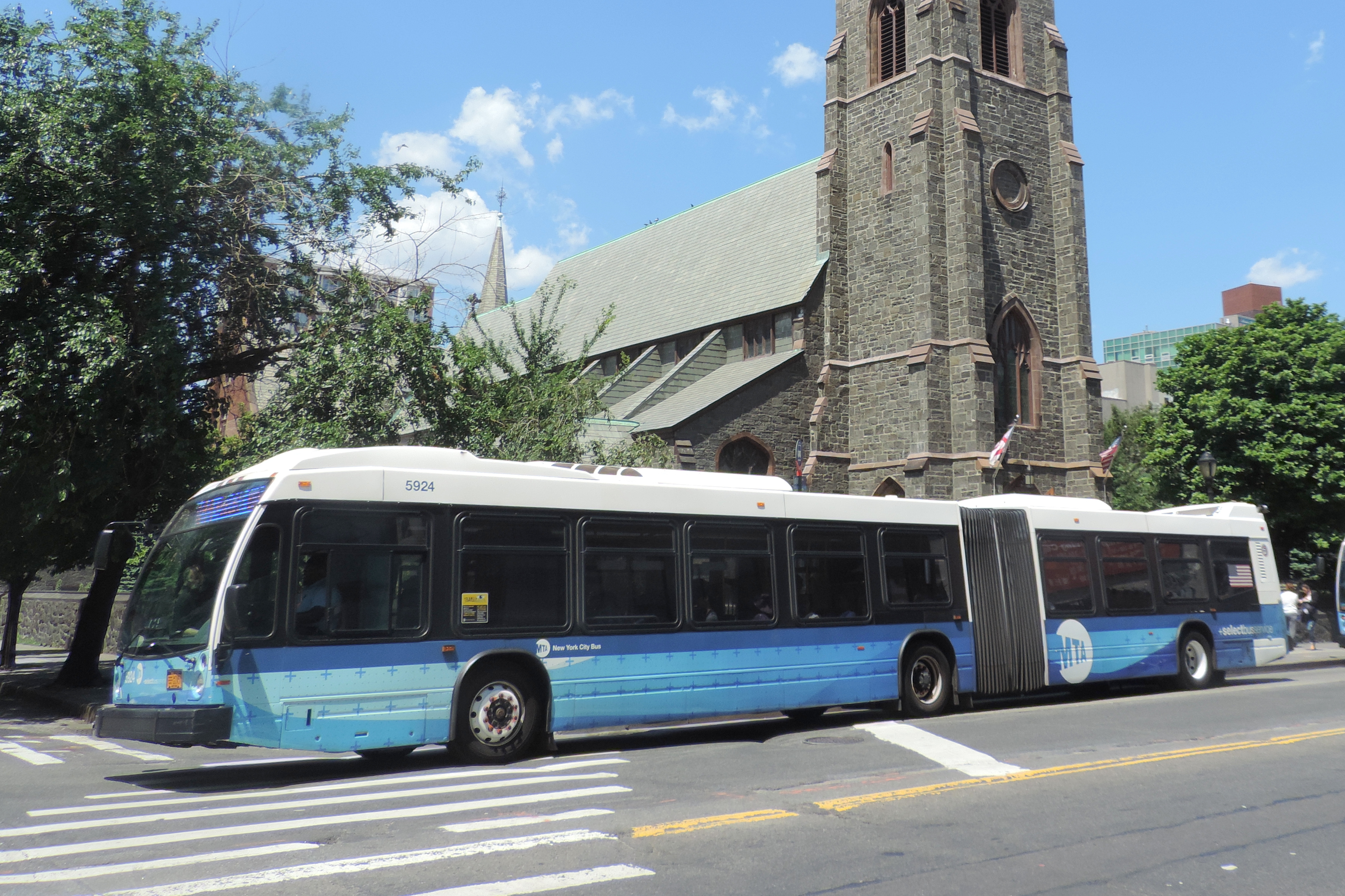

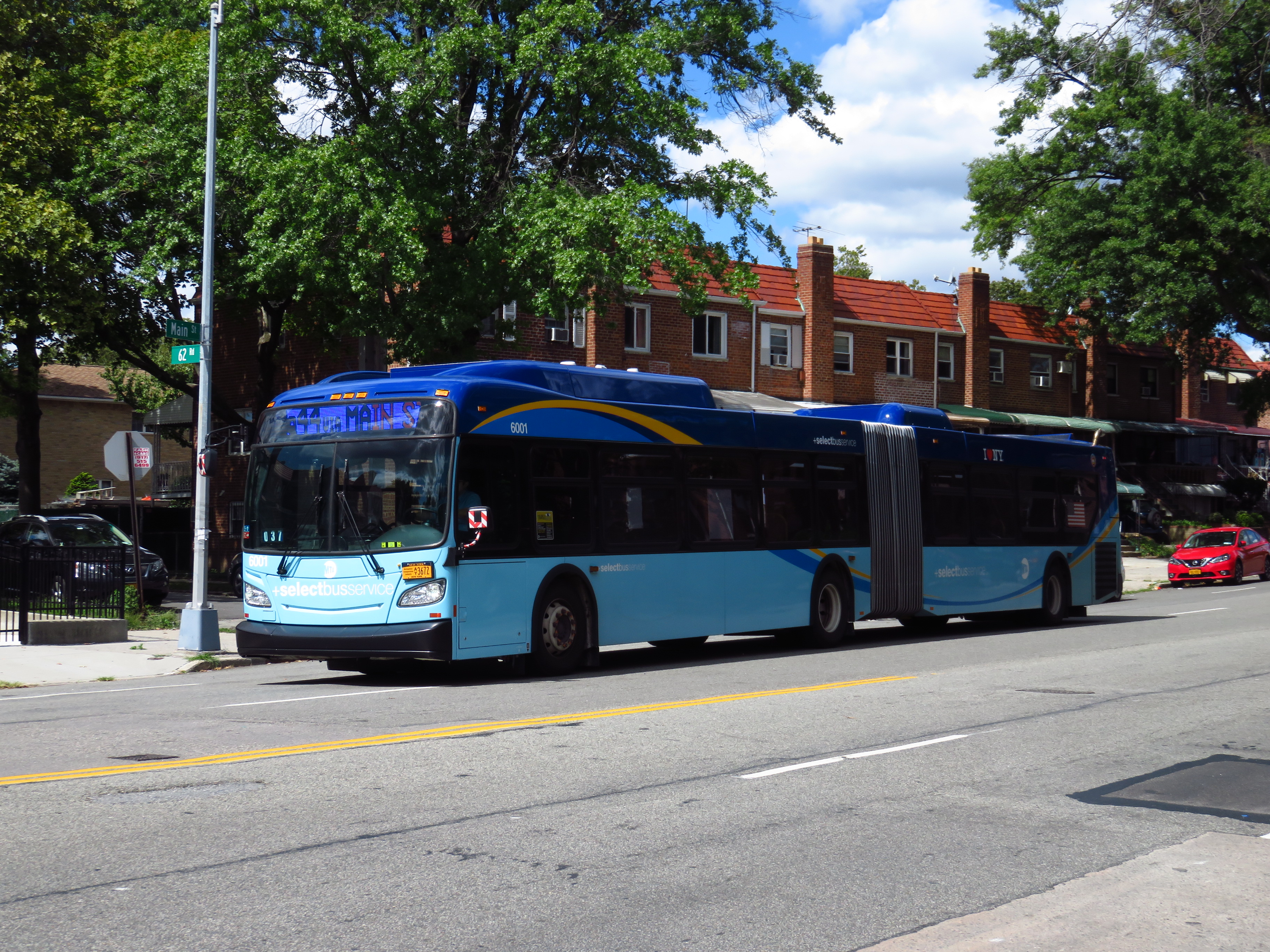
A 2012 Nova LFS Articulated (5924) at St George's Church in 2016, and a 2016 XD60 (6001) on the Jamaica-bound Q44 SBS at Main Street/62nd Road in Flushing.

In 2004 and 2006, the Main Street corridor was identified as a potential route for Flushing-Jamaica bus rapid transit (BRT) service, as part of the first phase of the MTA and DOT's Select Bus Service (SBS) plan. The corridor was ultimately not included in the first phase of SBS routes. In February 2008, the MTA proposed an additional limited-stop service on the northern portion of the corridor between Flushing and Fordham Plaza, provisionally named the Q94. Eliminating the required transfer to the Bx9 at East 180th Street, it was referred to as a "Super Limited", and would have also replaced the special X32 school service (since discontinued) between Queens and Bedford Park.

Though the Q94 was never implemented, the Q44 route was included in the SBS Phase II study in 2009. On June 9, 2012, the Q44 became the first route in Queens to have a fleet of articulated buses; the same buses (the Nova Bus LFS model) used on SBS service. In 2014, the 164th Street corridor (Q65) and the Parsons/Kissena corridor (Q25 and Q34) joined the Main Street corridor as potential SBS routes between Flushing and Jamaica. The Q25 Limited and Q44 Limited were selected for further studies, with the Q44 prioritized due to its high ridership, interborough connection between Queens and the Bronx, and the width of Main Street to facilitate bus lanes. As part of the conversion, eight stops in the Bronx were eliminated; those retained constituted 85% of passenger usage in the borough. Several limited stops in the Jamaica business district were also eliminated. In addition, Q44 Limited stops at Guy R Brewer Boulevard/165th Street and Archer Avenue, Main Street and Northern Boulevard, Parsons Boulevard and 17th Avenue, Parsons Boulevard and 21st Avenue, and the southbound only stop at Whitestone Expressway and Center Drive were eliminated.

On November 29, 2015, the Q44 SBS began service, operating 24 hours a day. The Q20A became a full-time route to replace the discontinued late-night-only Q44 local route.

In January 2023, the MTA released a strategic action plan called "Extending Transit's Reach". As part of this plan, the Q44 SBS fleet was scheduled to receive bike racks. The bike racks had been installed on the fronts of the buses by 2024.

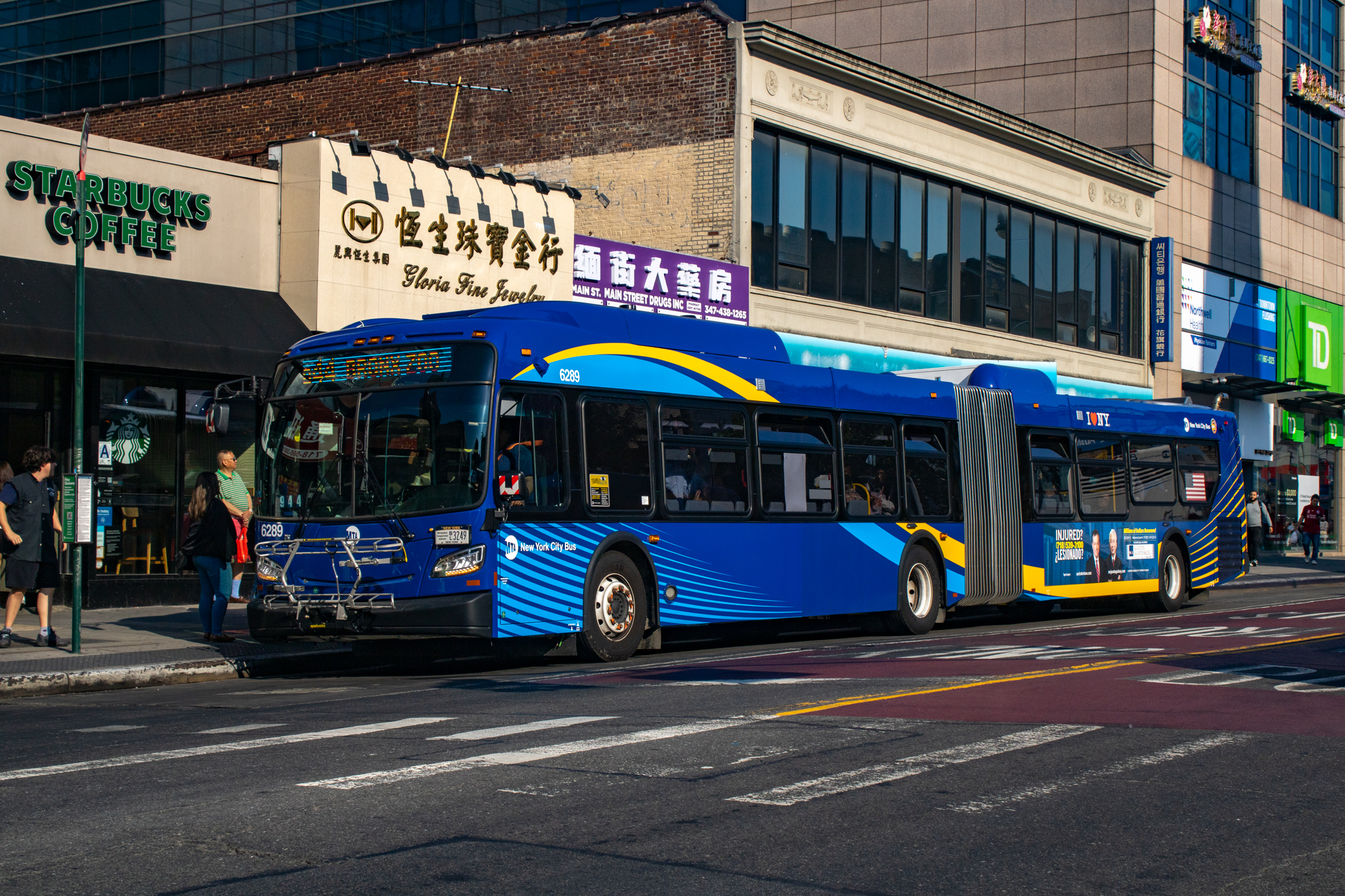
A 2025 XD60 (6289) on the Bronx Zoo-bound Q44-SBS in Flushing, equipped with a bike rack

=== Bus redesign ===
In December 2019, the MTA released a draft redesign of the Queens bus network. As part of the redesign, the Q44 would have become a "high-density" route called the QT44 and would be extended in the Bronx to Fordham Plaza Bus Terminal. The Q20 would have been replaced by a "neighborhood" route, the QT86, which would run from Linden Place in College Point to Cooper Avenue in Glendale, leaving the Main Street corridor at Vleigh Place. The 20th and 14th Avenue corridors would have been served by the QT64 and QT84, respectively. The redesign was delayed due to the COVID-19 pandemic in New York City in 2020, and the original draft plan was dropped due to negative feedback.

A revised plan was released in March 2022. Under the new plan, the Q44 would have still been extended to Fordham Plaza and the northbound stop for Kissena Boulevard would be removed. The Q20 would still run on Main Street but would no longer have branches; the 20th and 14th Avenue corridors would be taken over by the Q76 and Q31, respectively. The northern part of the Q20 would have taken over the Q15's routing in Beechhurst, while its southern terminus would have been cut back to the Briarwood station.

A final bus-redesign plan was released in December 2023. The Q20's branches would be combined into a single route, which would run at all times using the Q20B's existing routing via 14th Avenue; the 20th Avenue routing would be served by the Q76 and a new Q62 route. The Q20 would be diverted to serve the Mitchell-Linden Houses in Flushing, previously served by the Q34 (which would be eliminated). The Q20 would also be diverted upon entering Jamaica, following the Q60 towards Jamaica Avenue, and then heading right on Sutphin Boulevard. The Q44 would remain unchanged.

On December 17, 2024, addendums to the final plan were released. Among these, the Q20 had stop changes made, and service on Union Street was retained. In addition, the MTA decided to preserve the Q20A routing on 20th Avenue in College Point, rather than the Q20B routing, which would instead be taken over by the Q76. On January 29, 2025, the current plan was approved by the MTA Board, and the Queens Bus Redesign went into effect in two different phases during Summer 2025. The Q20 is part of Phase I, which started on June 29, 2025. As of this date, the Q44 extension to Fordham Plaza is still being considered for a separate implementation.

== Incidents ==
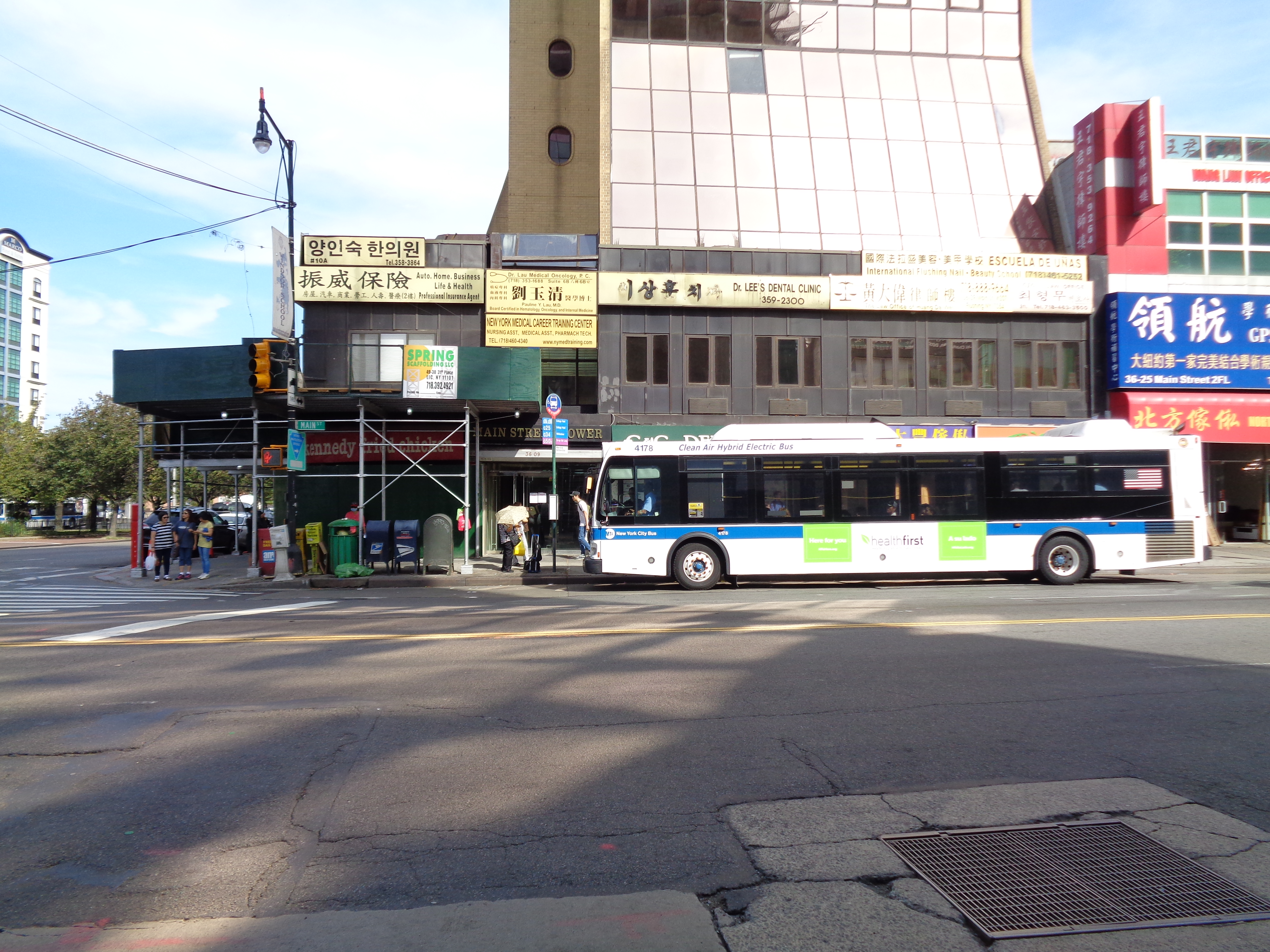
The intersection of Main Street/Northern Boulevard as seen on September 26, 2017, eight days after a crash between a 2015 New Flyer XD40 (7430) and a tour bus, with a 2009 Orion VII NG HEV (4178) on the Q20A in the picture. The crash damaged the building on the left, which has scaffolding on it as a result of the collision.

On September 18, 2017, during the morning rush hour, a private tour bus moving at a high speed collided with the back of a New Flyer Xcelsior XD40 Q20A bus turning from Main Street onto Northern Boulevard in Flushing. The bus then plowed into a Kennedy Fried Chicken restaurant at the corner of the intersection. The accident killed 3 people including the tour bus driver, and injured at least 17. The private charter bus company had been repeatedly cited for reckless driving. The charter driver was a former MTA bus driver, until he was fired in April 2015 after a crash in his personal automobile in which he pleaded guilty to driving under the influence and leaving the scene of the crash.

In the early morning of July 4, 2023, a Q44 bus was en route to the Bronx Zoo when it was involved in a car crash on the Cross Bronx Expressway at Havemeyer Avenue. A total of twelve were injured.

== See also ==
- Q17 (New York City bus), another New York City bus route connecting Flushing to Jamaica
- Q25 (New York City bus), another New York City bus corridor connecting Flushing to Jamaica
- Q65 (New York City bus), another New York City bus route connecting Flushing to Jamaica
- Q74 (New York City bus, 1940–2010), a former New York City bus route that ran on Main Street
