= Pomonok, Queens =

Neighborhood in New York City

Coordinates: 40°44′0″N 73°48′45″W

Pomonok is a working class neighborhood within the Flushing area in the New York City borough of Queens. Its borders are the Long Island Expressway to the north; Kissena Boulevard to the west; 73rd Avenue to the south; and 164th Street to the east. The surrounding neighborhoods are Queensboro Hill to the north; Auburndale to the northeast; Kew Gardens Hills to the west; and the Utopia/Hillcrest areas of Fresh Meadows to both the east and southeast.

The neighborhood is notably home to two large housing developments, both of which are along Jewel Avenue. Those developments being the Pomonok Houses, maintained by the New York City Housing Authority between Kissena and Parsons Boulevards and the Electchester co-op between Parsons Boulevard and 164th Street. Both developments were built between 1949 and 1951 on the site of the former Pomonok Country Club.

The neighborhood’s name comes from the Algonquian name for Long Island, and means either "land of tribute" or "land where there is travelling by water".

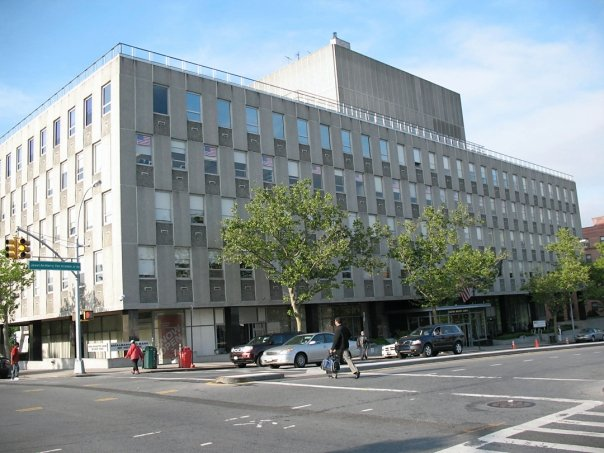
The Electchester Local 3 Union Building in October 2007

Pomonok is part of Queens Community District 8 and is also patrolled by the 107th Precinct of the New York City Police Department.

Map of Pomonok

== History ==
The Pomonok Country Club was a golf course in Pomonok that operated between 1886 and 1949. The golf course was located between Kissena Boulevard and 164th Street, just to the south of Horace Harding Boulevard (now the Long Island Expressway) and to the east of Queens College. The club was established in 1886 by members of the Flushing Athletic Club in Flushing and moved to the Kissena Boulevard location in 1921. Devereux Emmet designed the golf course. The golf course hosted the PGA Championship in 1939, which Henry Picard won. The members disbanded and sold the course in 1949. Part of the site today contains the Electchester cooperative housing development, Pomonok public housing and an extension of Parsons Boulevard.

In 1992, New York City settled a lawsuit brought on behalf of 100,000 families who claimed that the city had steered all white families applying for public housing into Pomonok and had provided the public housing complex with higher standards of care and maintenance than those inhabited by majority Black and Hispanic families.

== Electchester Housing Complex ==
Electchester is a cooperative housing complex on the other side of the small neighborhood between Parsons Boulevard and 164th Street in Pomonok, which was established by Harry Van Arsdale, Jr. and Local 3 of the International Brotherhood of Electrical Workers in 1949, when Van Arsdale worked with the Joint Industry Board of the Electrical Industry to purchase 103 acres (0.42 km^{2}) of the former Pomonok Country Club and build apartment buildings. About 5,550 people live in about 2,500 units in 36 buildings, including a pair of 23-story towers and a network of three and six-story brick structures. It is served by Public School 200, which is on land donated by Electchester. The union provided the majority of the mortgage. New York state offered tax abatements. Electchester was classified as a "limited dividend nonprofit", subject to state regulations. The first families paid $475 per room for equity shares, and carrying charges of $26 per month per room, on apartments ranging from three and a half to five and a half rooms.

Electchester also contains the JIB Lanes Bowling Alley and a shopping center, containing a supermarket, a pharmacy and other small stores. In the early 2020’s, a Popeyes location opened in the area as well as a dental office.

Both housing complexes are patrolled by the nearby 107th Precinct of the New York City’s Police Department. There is also an NYPD PSA-9 Housing Police Unit station located in the Pomonok Houses.

== Health ==
The nearest hospitals are Queens Hospital Center and New York–Presbyterian Hospital Queens.

== Education ==
Nearby are major facilities such as CUNY Queens College, St. John's University, Touro College, Rabbinical Seminary of America along with various public and private schools. The CUNY Law School, formerly in the area, moved to the Long Island City neighborhood in May of 2012.

Queens Public Library has a branch in Pomonok, within the Local 3 Union Building in the Electchester complex.

== Community ==
Onsite of Pomonok Houses is the Pomonok Community Center (PCC), operated by Queens Community House. It hosts a senior center, after school program, and, in the summer months, a camp and teen program.

== Transportation ==
=== Buses ===
While there are no train lines present in Pomonok, the neighborhood is served by various MTA Regional Bus Operations routes.

Pomonok is served by the Q25, Q64, Q65 and Q74 routes as well as the QM4 and QM44 routes which run express to Midtown Manhattan. The Q17 and Q88 routes also serve the neighborhood on Horace Harding Expressway.

The aforementioned routes and the Q20, Q44, Q45, Q46 and Q48 bus routes as well as the QM1, QM5, QM6, QM7, QM8, QM31 and QM35 express routes in neighboring Kew Gardens Hills all have New York City Subway transfers and Long Island Rail Road connections in the Briarwood, Downtown Flushing, Elmhurst, Forest Hills, Jamaica, Kew Gardens and Rego Park neighborhoods.

=== Highways ===
Alongside the Long Island Expressway, the following highways are also nearby the Pomonok area:

- Grand Central Parkway at Exit 22A of the Long Island Expressway in Flushing Meadows-Corona Park and 69th Road.
- Van Wyck and Whitestone Expressway at Exit 22B of the Long Island Expressway in Flushing Meadows-Corona Park as well as Jewel Avenue and Park Drive East.
- Jackie Robinson Parkway at Exit 7A-B of the Van Wyck Expressway and at Exit 14 of the Grand Central Parkway at the Kew Gardens Interchange.

== Notable people ==
People who were born in, residents of, or otherwise closely associated with Pomonok (including the Pomonok and Electchester houses) include:

- Gary Ackerman (born 1942) — former U.S. Representative from New York, serving from 1983 to 2013
- Barry Grodenchik (born 1960) — council member representing the 23rd District of the New York City Council
- Michael Simanowitz (1971–2017) —member of the New York State Assembly
- Harry Van Arsdale Jr. (1905-1986) — labor, civil rights and community leader in New York City, who was behind the development of Electchester
- Bob Weinstein (born 1954) — film producer
- Harvey Weinstein (born 1952) — film producer

== See also ==
- List of Queens neighborhoods
- Paumanok
- Paumanok Path
