= Queens Surface Corporation =

Defunct bus company in New York City

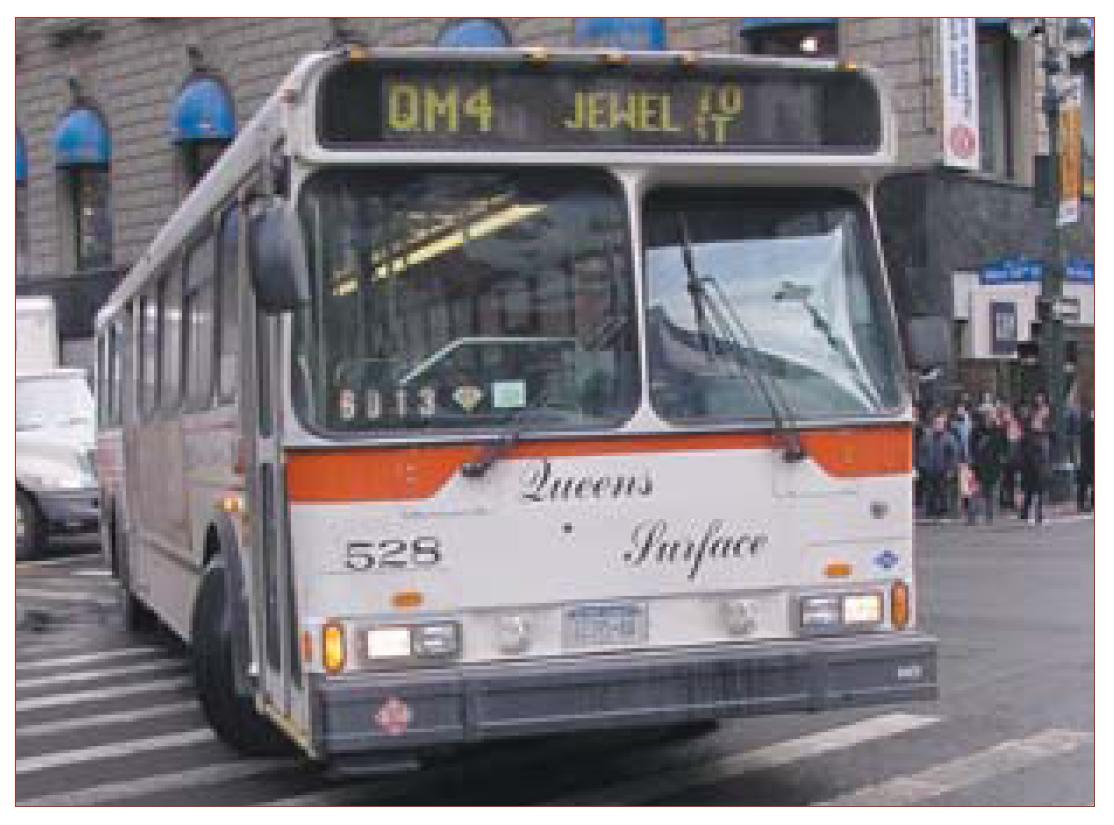
Queens Surface QM4 bus in Midtown Manhattan. This bus is now retired and scrapped.

Queens Surface Corporation was a bus company in New York City, United States, operating local service in Queens and the Bronx and express service between Queens and Manhattan until February 27, 2005, when the MTA Bus Company took over the operations and renamed its facility to the College Point Depot. The company was known for its orange paint scheme, used since the company's inception in the late 1930s.

Queens Surface Corporation was privately held by the Gordon and Burke families. The Queens Surface Corporation facility was located at 128-15 28th Avenue in the College Point neighborhood of Queens.

== History ==
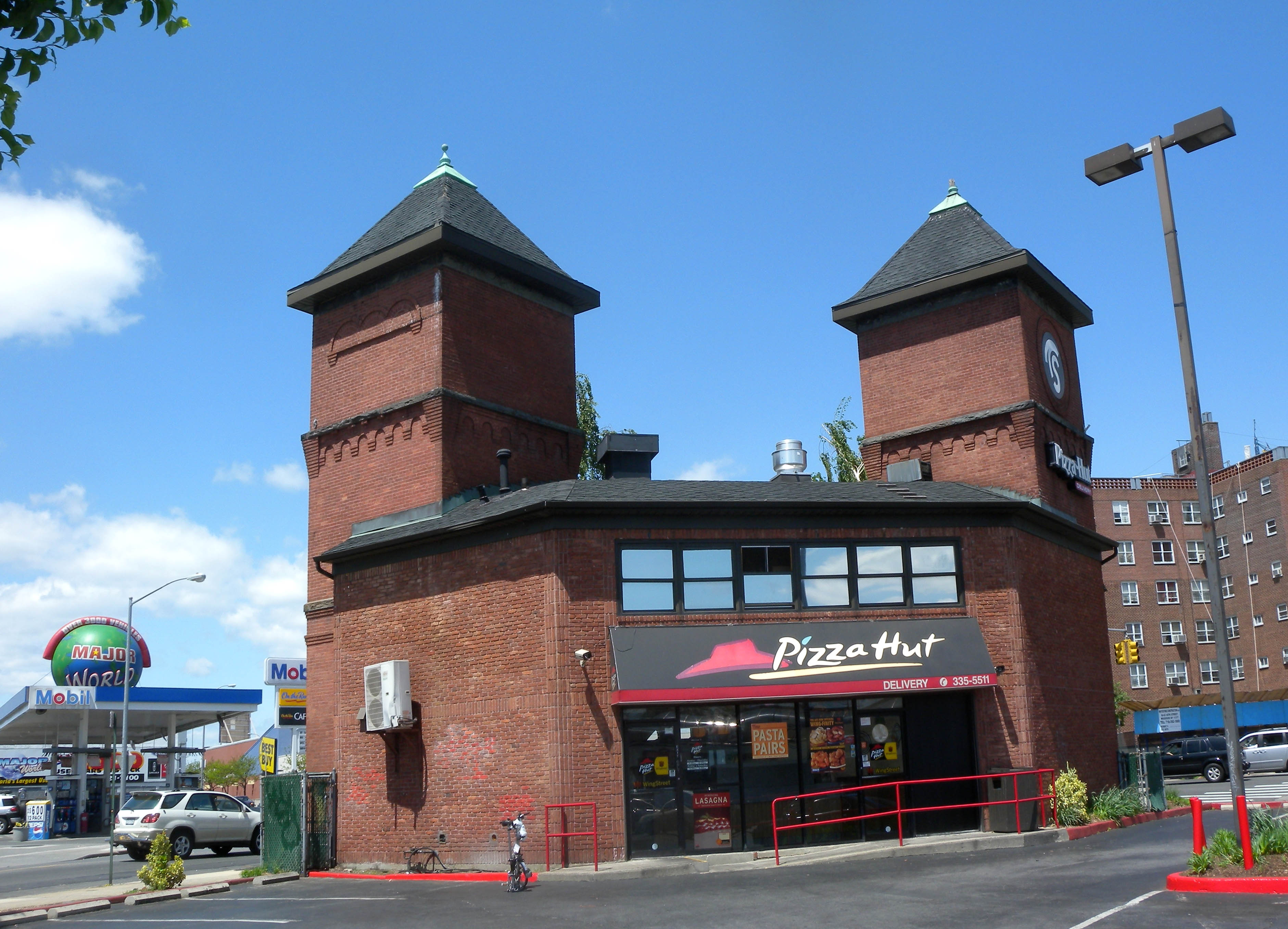
Partial remains of the former Steinway/New York and Queens County Railway car barn in Woodside. Now a Pizza Hut franchise.

=== New York and Queens County Railway ===
The New York and Queens County Railway (NY&QC) became the largest trolley line in Queens in 1896, through the consolidation of four previous streetcar operators: Flushing and College Point Electric Railway, Long Island City and Newtown Railway, Newtown Railway, and the original Steinway Railway Company. It served Long Island City, Woodside, Astoria, North Beach, College Point, Jamaica, and even the Queensboro Bridge. Between 1903 and 1922, the NY&QC became an affiliate of the Interborough Rapid Transit Company. On June 24, 1930, the Woodside Car barn was hit with a massive fire that destroyed much of their fleet, along with the fleet of their competitors, the Steinway Railway (see below).

=== Steinway Railway ===
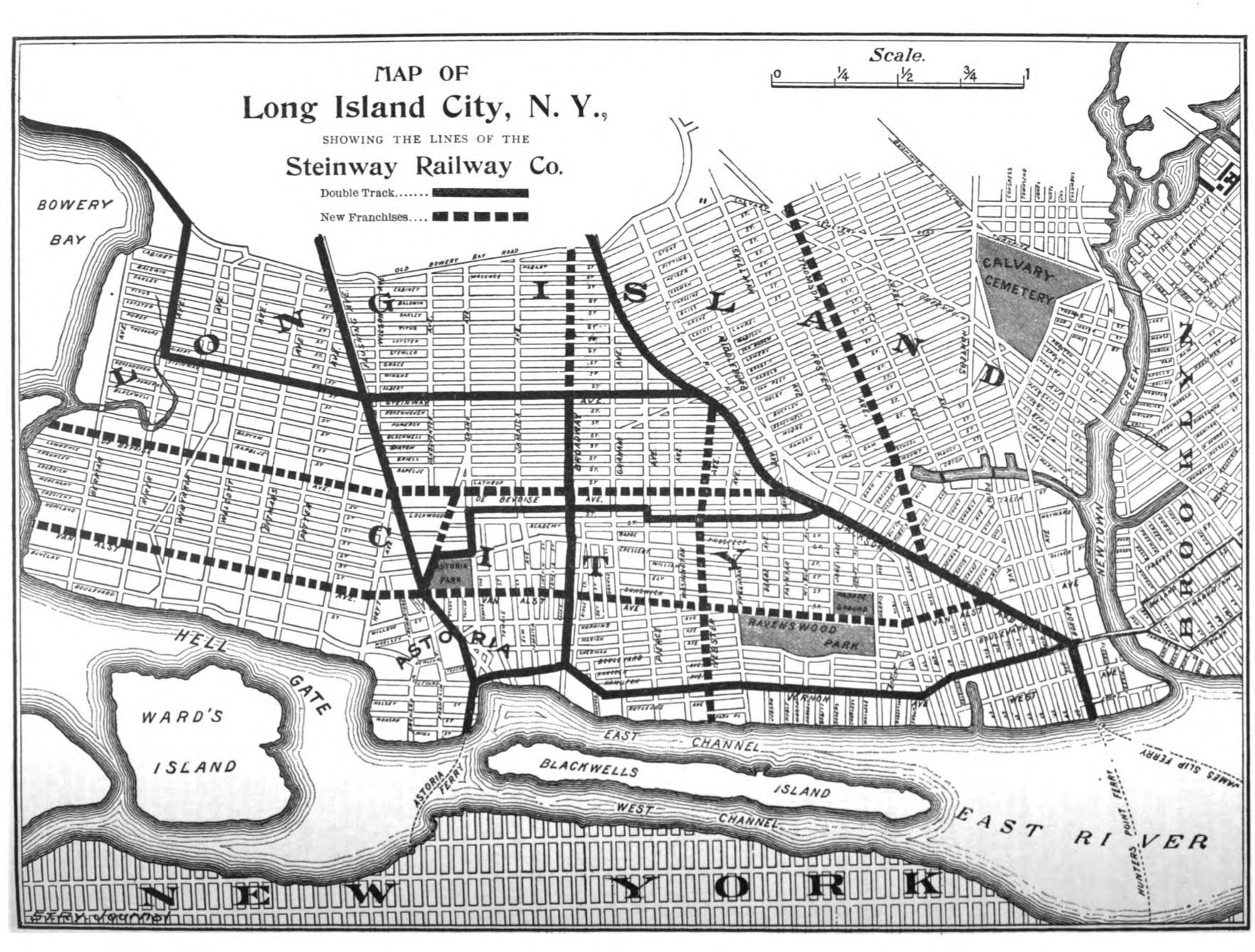
Long Island City Steinway Railway Company c 1894

The Steinway Railway operated in northwestern Queens in 1892, through the merger of the Rikers Avenue and Sanford Point Railroad and Steinway and Hunters Point Railroad, only to be acquired by NY&QC in 1896. As NY&QC faced bankruptcy in 1922, it began to sell off Steinway as a somewhat independent company. It was bought by the Third Avenue Railway System but was allowed to operate under its own name.

=== Bustitution and re-merging ===
On February 19, 1926, NY&QC established a bus division called the Queens-Nassau Transit Lines. Queens-Nassau buses replaced all NY&QC trolleys by 1937, with the last being motorized on October 30 of that year. In the fall of 1938, the Steinway Railway was bought by Queensboro Bridge Railway Company and renamed as Steinway Omnibus. Steinway began operating buses over former Steinway Railway lines on September 29, 1939. Both companies were operated by the same management, and casually referred to as the "orange buses". Queens-Nassau was renamed Queens Transit Corporation in 1957, and Steinway Omnibus became Steinway Transit in 1959. The two companies merged again in 1986 to form the Queens/Steinway Transit Corporation. The joint company was owned by the H.E. Salzberg Company (scrap metal and short-haul railways) with father Harold Salzberg, son Murray M. Salzberg (1915-1984, aged 69) and grandson Harry Salzberg, which had ripped up the rails, running these two companies until 1988, when the Linden Bus Company acquired the routes from the aging grandson Harry Salzberg. Shortly thereafter and before operations commenced, Linden Bus Company changed its name to Queens Surface Corporation.

On February 27, 2005, the MTA Bus Company took over the operations of the Queens Surface routes, part of the city's takeover of all the remaining privately operated bus routes.

== Bus routes ==
Prior to MTA Bus takeover, Queens Surface operated the following routes that are now based in College Point Bus Depot, the LaGuardia Depot (the former Triboro Coach depot), and the Eastchester Depot (the former New York Bus Service depot in the Bronx).

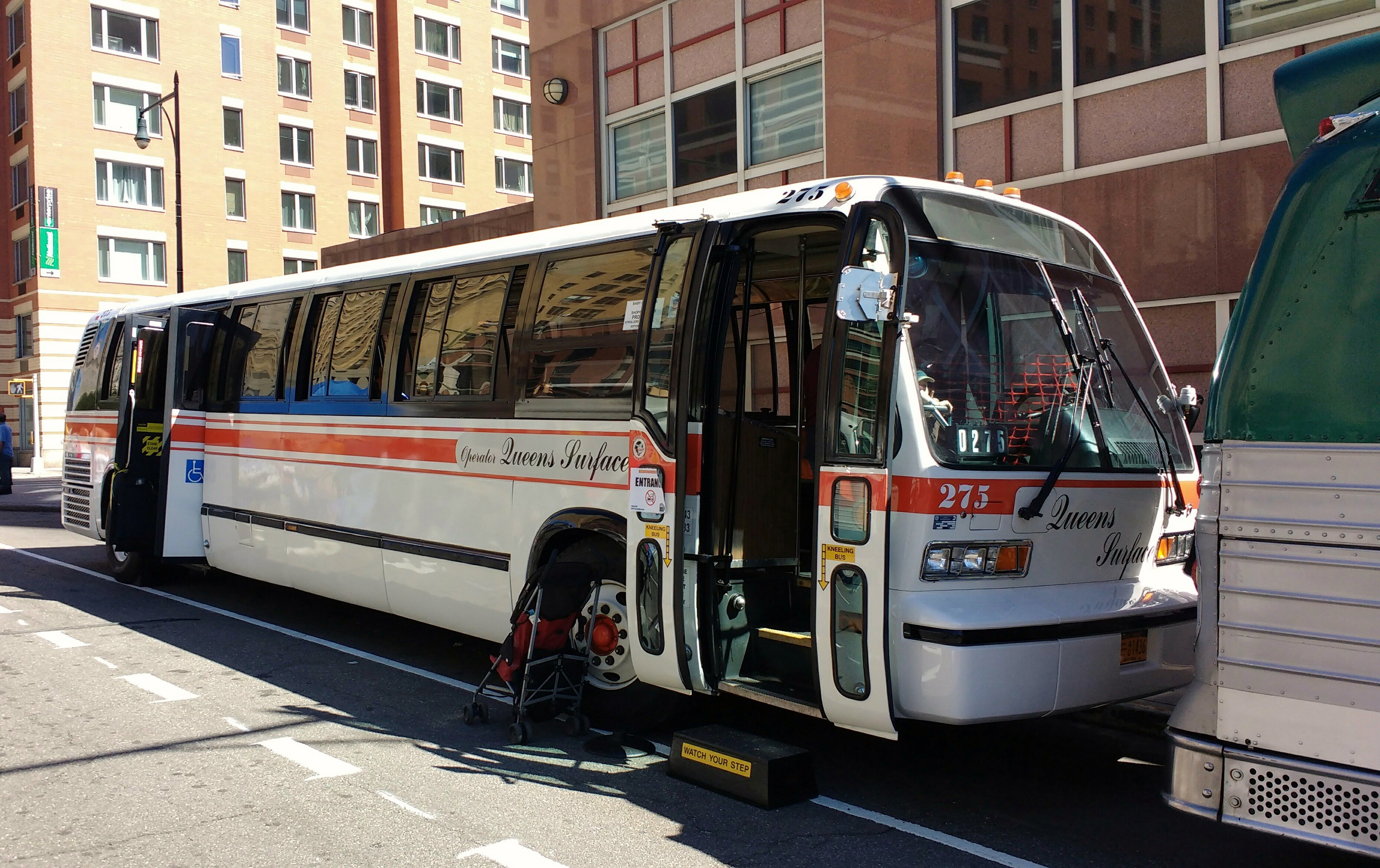
275 is preserved in the museum fleet

Route	Terminal A	Major streets of travel	Terminal B	Notes/History
FORMER QUEENS SURFACE CORPORATION BUS ROUTES
Bronx and Queens Local
QBx1	Flushing; Main Street and 39th Avenue near Flushing – Main Street ( 7 <7> trains)	Whitestone Expressway, Hutchinson River Parkway, Bruckner Boulevard, Co-op City Boulevard	Co-op City, Bronx; Earhart Lane and Erskine Place	* Limited Stop Service; most service ran exclusively between Pelham Bay Park and Co-op City.: Moved to Eastchester Depot in 2009.; Interborough service relabeled to the Q50 and Co-op City shuttle service relabeled to the Bx23 in 2010.; Off-peak Q50 service to Co-Op City discontinued in 2022.; Overnight Q50 service implemented in 2025.
Queens Local
Q25	Jamaica; Sutphin Boulevard and 94th Avenue at Sutphin Boulevard – Archer Avenue – JFK Airport ( E J Z trains) and Jamaica LIRR / AirTrain Station	Parsons Boulevard, Kissena Boulevard, 127th Street	College Point; Poppenhusen Avenue and 119th Street	Originally owned by Flushing Heights Bus Company, service began in 1928.; Acquired by Queens–Nassau Transit, Inc. on May 25, 1933.; Weekdays, Q34 also provided service between Flushing and Jamaica.; The original Q25 terminus was in Flushing; it was combined with the then-Q34 route into College Point.; Southern terminus moved from 160th Street and Jamaica Avenue to Parsons Boulevard and Jamaica Avenue in 2005; extended to Jamaica LIRR station on Sutphin Boulevard in 2006.; Limited-stop service implemented in 2007; discontinued in 2025.
Q34	Jamaica; Sutphin Boulevard and 94th Avenue at Sutphin Boulevard – Archer Avenue – JFK Airport ( E J Z trains) and Jamaica LIRR / AirTrain Station	Parsons Boulevard, Kissena Boulevard, Union Street	Whitestone; Willets Point Boulevard and 149th Street	Service began in April 1933.; Weekday service only.; The original Q34 route was the College Point segment of the Q25; it was later rerouted to Whitestone and Linden Hill and then extended along the Q25 route.; Southern terminus moved from 160th Street and Jamaica Avenue to Parsons Boulevard and Jamaica Avenue in 2004; extended to Jamaica LIRR station on Sutphin Boulevard in 2006.; Discontinued in 2025; Whitestone and Linden Hill service replaced by the Q61.
Q65	Jamaica; Sutphin Boulevard and 94th Avenue at Sutphin Boulevard – Archer Avenue – JFK Airport ( E J Z trains) and Jamaica LIRR / AirTrain Station	164th Street, 45th Avenue, College Point Boulevard	College Point; 14th Avenue and 110th Street	Service started on August 10, 1937, to replace Flushing–Jamaica Line and College Point Line streetcar service.; Southern terminus moved from 160th Street and Jamaica Avenue to Parsons Boulevard and Jamaica Avenue in 2004; extended to Jamaica LIRR station on Sutphin Boulevard in 2006.; Limited-stop service implemented in 2007; discontinued in 2025; Northern terminus truncated to Flushing-Main Street in 2025.
Q65A	Forest Hills; Queens Boulevard and 71st Avenue at Forest Hills – 71st Avenue ( E F <F> M R trains)	Jewel Avenue	Electchester; 164th Street and Jewel Avenue	Service started in 1951.; Renumbered as Q64 in 2007.; Was at Baisley Park Depot from 2014 to 2025.
Q66	Long Island City; 28th Street and Queens Plaza South at Queensboro Plaza ( 7 <7> N W trains) and Queens Plaza ( E F <F> R trains)	21st Street, 35th Avenue, Northern Boulevard	Flushing; Main Street and 39th Avenue near Flushing – Main Street ( 7 <7> trains)	Service started on September 5, 1937, to replace streetcar service.; Original terminus was at 51st Street in Woodside; extended to Queens Plaza in 1989.
Q67	Long Island City; 28th Street and Queens Plaza South at Queensboro Plaza ( 7 <7> N W trains) and Queens Plaza ( E F <F> R trains)	21st Street, Borden Avenue, 55th Avenue, 69th Street	Middle Village; Metropolitan Avenue and Fresh Pond Road	Service started on October 30, 1937, to replace streetcar service.; Original Middle Village terminal replaced by Fresh Pond Road terminal after the Metro Mall in Middle Village was built and opened in 1974. The mall sits on some of the side streets that were formerly used to turn buses, therefore the route was extended several blocks west to Fresh Pond Road, and uses Eliot Avenue to turn around back on to Metropolitan Avenue.; Moved to LaGuardia Depot in 2010.; Transferred to NYCT with northern terminus truncated to Court Square in 2025.
Queens-Manhattan express
QM2	Midtown Manhattan; 6th Avenue	Manhattan: 34th Street, 6th Avenue (or 3rd Avenue), 57th Street (Manhattan bound), 59th Street (Queens bound); Queens: Whitestone Expressway service road (weekdays only), Parsons Boulevard (weekends only), Cross Island Parkway service road	Bay Terrace; Bay Terrace Shopping Center	Bayside-Whitestone Express, via 6th Avenue or 3rd Avenue; Operated by Queens Transit from 1969 until June 30, 1988.; Operated by Queens Surface Corporation from July 1, 1988, until MTA takeover on February 27, 2005.; Last Manhattan bound dropoff is at 57th Street and 3rd Avenue.; Last Queens-bound pickup is on 59th Street and Lexington Avenue.; Rerouted away from Whitestone Expressway Service Road to serve Parsons Boulevard on weekends on April 6, 2014.; Rerouted away from 57th Street onto 59th Street in the Queens-bound direction on August 24, 2015.; 3rd Ave route split off to QM32 in early September 2016.
QM2A	Midtown Manhattan; 6th Avenue	Manhattan: 34th Street, 6th Avenue, 57th Street (Manhattan bound), 59th Street (Queens bound); Queens: Willets Point Boulevard, Utopia Parkway, 26th Avenue	Bay Terrace; Corporal Kennedy Street and 23rd Avenue	Clearview, Linden & Mitchell Express; Weekday service only.; Operated by Queens Transit from 1971 until June 30, 1988.; Operated by Queens Surface Corporation from July 1, 1988, until MTA takeover on February 27, 2005.; Last Manhattan bound dropoff is at 57th Street and 3rd Avenue.; Last Queens-bound pickup is at 59th Street and Lexington Avenue.; Rerouted off of 57th Street and onto 59th Street in the Queens-bound direction on August 24, 2015.; Renumbered to QM20 in September 2011.
QM3	Midtown Manhattan; 6th Avenue	Manhattan: 34th Street, 6th Avenue, 57th Street (Manhattan bound), 59th Street (Queens bound); Queens: Northern Boulevard, Little Neck Parkway.	Little Neck; Little Neck Parkway and Horace Harding Expressway	Deepdale-Douglaston Express; Originally Operated by Queens Transit from 1970 until 1988.; Temporarily operated by Caravan Transit from 1988 until 1990.; Operated by Queens Surface Corporation from 1990 until MTA takeover in 2005.; Last drop off is on 57th Street and 3rd Avenue.; Last pick up to Queens is on 59th Street and Lexington Avenue.; Queens-bound buses taken off 57th Street and put onto 59th Street on August 24, 2015.; Discontinued in 2025.
QM4	Midtown Manhattan; 6th Avenue	Manhattan: 34th Street, 6th Avenue (or 3rd Avenue), 57th Street; Queens: Jewel Avenue	Electchester; 164th Street and Horace Harding Expressway	Jewel Avenue Express; Operated by Queens Transit from 1971 until 1988.; Operated by Queens Surface Corporation from 1988 until MTA takeover in 2005.; Last dropoff is at 57th Street and 3rd Avenue.; Former 3rd Avenue service relabeled to QM44 on July 5, 2016.
FORMER STEINWAY TRANSIT BUS ROUTES (moved to LaGuardia Depot in 2009-2010)
Queens Local
Q101	East Midtown, Manhattan; East 61st Street and 2nd Avenue	Northern Boulevard, Steinway Street, 20th Avenue	Steinway; 77th Street and Hazen Street	Service started on November 1, 1939, to replace Steinway Street Line streetcar service.; Formerly operated by Steinway Transit until 1988, and then by Queens Surface Corporation until takeover in 2005.; Original northern terminus was Rikers' Island; when the Q101R (now Q100) was created, service was truncated to 19th Avenue. Prior to the creation of the Q101R, this route was the only local bus route to traverse three boroughs, since Rikers' Island is located in The Bronx.; Traveled between Manhattan and Queens via the Queensboro Bridge until 2025.; Northern terminus truncated to 38th Street and southern terminus rerouted to Hunters Point via Jackson Avenue on August 31st, 2025.
Q101R	Long Island City; Jackson Avenue and Queens Plaza South at Queensboro Plaza ( 7 <7> N W trains) and Queens Plaza ( E F <F> R trains)	21st Street, 20th Avenue	Rikers Island, Bronx	Started service in the 1980s.; Formerly operated by Queens Surface Corporation until takeover in 2005.; Renumbered as Q100 on April 6, 2008.; Originally non-stop between Long Island City and Rikers Island parking lot.; Limited-stop service along 21st Street began on February 1, 2009.
Q102	Roosevelt Island, Manhattan; Coler-Goldwater Hospital	Main Street (Manhattan), Vernon Boulevard, 31st Street, 30th Avenue	Astoria; 27th Avenue and 2nd Street	Service started on September 29, 1939, to replace a Steinway Streetcar.; Formerly operated by Steinway Transit until 1988, and then by Queens Surface Corporation until takeover in 2005.; Travels between Manhattan and Queens via the Roosevelt Island Bridge.; Newtown Avenue, Crescent Street, and Astoria Boulevard segment discontinued in favor of operating via 30th Avenue on June 29, 2014.; Western terminus truncated to Roosevelt Island Tramway and eastern terminus rerouted to Court Square via 36th Avenue on August 31, 2025.
Q103	Hunters Point; Borden Avenue and Vernon Boulevard at Vernon Boulevard – Jackson Avenue ( 7 <7> trains) and Long Island City LIRR station	Vernon Boulevard	Astoria; 27th Avenue and 2nd Street	Service started on September 29, 1939, to replace a Steinway Streetcar.; Formerly operated by Steinway Transit until 1988, and then by Queens Surface Corporation until takeover in 2005.; Weekend service added on June 29, 2014; Rerouted from Vernon Boulevard to 21st Street in Long Island City and extended to Hunters Point waterfront on August 31, 2025.
Q104	Ravenswood; Vernon Boulevard and 34th Avenue	Broadway, 48th Street	Sunnyside; 48th Street and Queens Boulevard at 46th Street – Bliss Street ( 7 train)	Service started on September 29, 1939, to replace a Steinway Streetcar.; Formerly operated by Steinway Transit until 1988, and then by Queens Surface Corporation until takeover in 2005.
Queens-Manhattan express
QM1	Midtown Manhattan; 6th Avenue or Downtown Manhattan; Downtown Loop	Manhattan: 34th Street, 6th Avenue, 57th Street; Queens: Union Turnpike, 188th Street	Fresh Meadows; 188th Street and 64th Avenue	Fresh Meadows Express; Operates during rush hours only, off peak service available via QM5; Off-peak service discontinued on December 31, 2015; Began service on February 26, 1968; operated by Steinway Transit from 1968 until 1988.; Last dropoff from Queens is at 57th Street.; Downtown trips redesignated QM7 in June 2010.; Former 3rd Ave branch split off to new QM31 in early September 2016
QM1A	Midtown Manhattan; 6th Avenue or Downtown Manhattan; Downtown Loop	Manhattan: 34th Street, 6th Avenue, 57th Street; Queens: Union Turnpike, 73rd Avenue, Horace Harding Expressway, Lakeville Road	Glen Oaks; 260th Street and Union Turnpike or Lake Success; North Shore Towers	Glen Oaks-Windsor Park Express, and Lake Success Express (a.k.a.; North Shore Towers Express); Operated by Steinway Transit from 1968 until 1988.; Temporarily operated by Caravan Transit from 1988 until 1990.; Operated by Queens Surface Corporation from 1988 or 1990 until MTA takeover in 2005.; Last dropoff from Queens is at 57th Street.; Glen Oaks-Windsor Park Express redesignated QM5 in June 2010.; Lake Success Express redesignated QM6 in June 2010.; Downtown trips redesignated QM8 in June 2010.; Former 3rd Avenue service on QM5 relabeled QM35 in September 2016; Former 3rd Avenue service on QM6 relabeled QM36 in early September 2016; Peak service only.; QM8 operates from Glen Oaks bypassing Fresh Meadows.; QM8 AM super express service serves Fresh Meadows.

== Depots ==
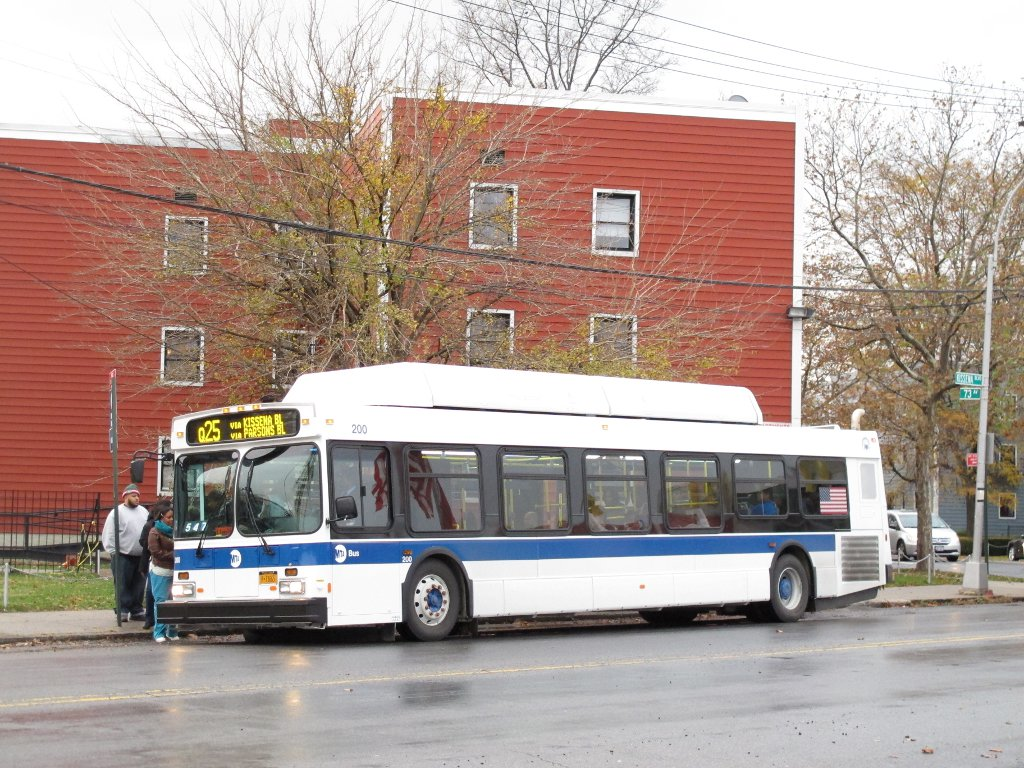
A New Flyer C40LF on the Q25

=== Queens Surface depot ===
Queens Surface's depot was located at 128-15 28th Avenue in the College Point section of Queens, near the printing plant of The New York Times and the former site of Flushing Airport. It was built in 1997 by the NYCDOT, and leased to Queens Surface. Many buses under Queens Surface used compressed natural gas (CNG). It is now the College Point Depot of the MTA Bus Company.

40.773378°N 73.840804°W

=== Steinway Transit depot ===
The Steinway Transit depot, built in 1939, was located at the northwest corner of Steinway Street and 20th Avenue in Astoria, Queens, near the northern terminus of the company's Q101 route. It was the successor to the Steinway Railway depot. The trolley depot sat across from the Daimler Manufacturing Company automobile factory, opened in 1890 by Gottlieb Daimler and local businessman William Steinway. The bus depot was closed prior to the company's takeover by the city, and has long been demolished, and replaced by new apartment buildings, similar to what was done at the old West Farms Depot site.

40.776744°N 73.901683°W

=== Woodside Garage ===
The Woodside Garage was located at 51-00 Northern Boulevard, at the southeast corner 51st Street and Northern Boulevard in Woodside, Queens, adjacent to the Winfield Junction of the Long Island Rail Road. It was the original headquarters of Queens-Nassau Transit. It was also the successor to the NY&QC Woodside Trolley Barn, which opened in 1896 and burned down on June 24, 1930. The front facade of the trolley barn survives as a Verizon store in the Tower Square Shopping Center.

40.752684°N 73.910128°W
