= Jewel Avenue buses =

Bus routes in Queens, New York

q64 q74 ltd qm4, qm44
- Jewel Avenue Line
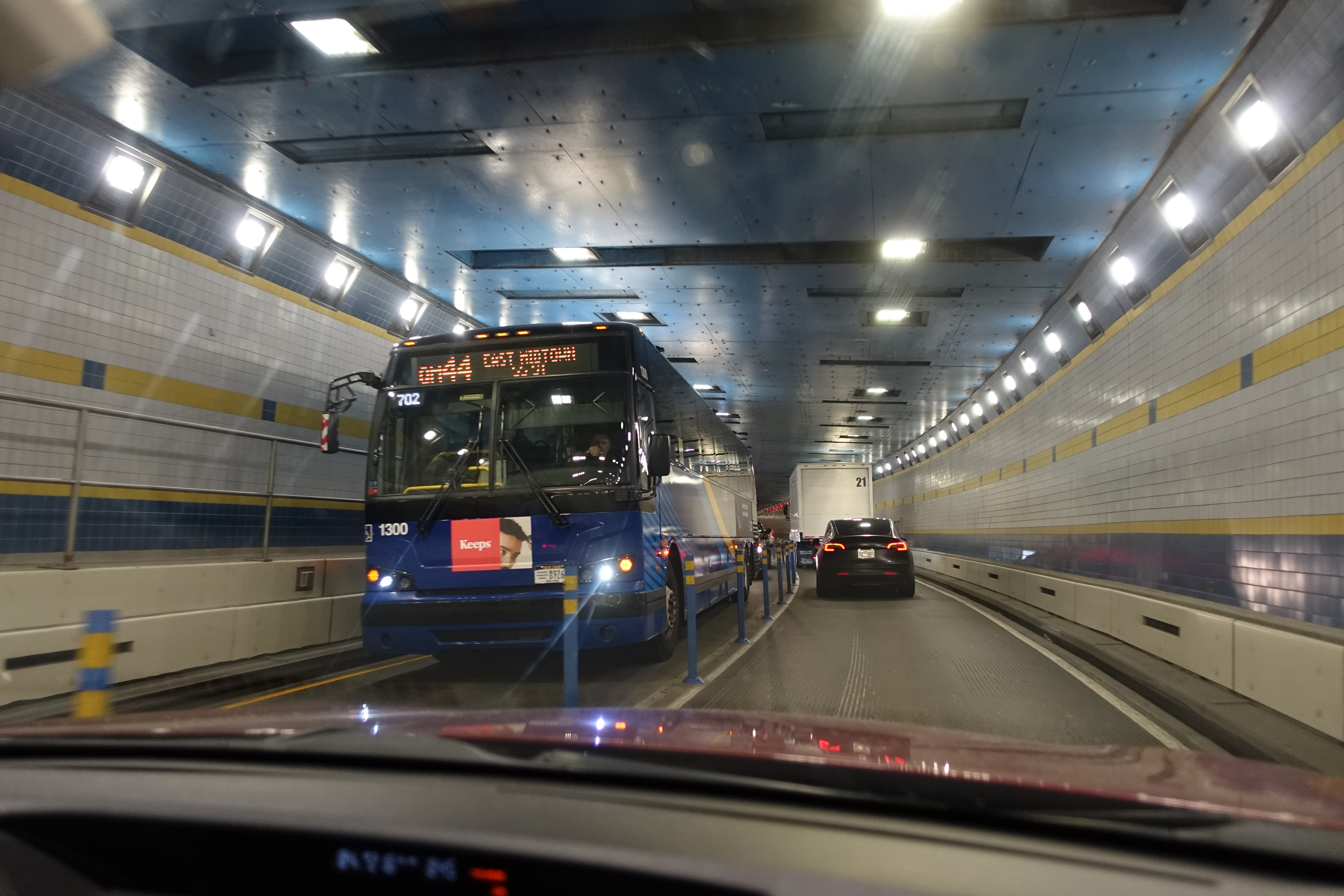
- A 2021 Prevost X3-45 (1300) on the East Midtown-bound QM44 in the Queens Midtown Tunnel in July 2022

Overview
- System: MTA Regional Bus Operations
- Operator: MTA Bus Company
- Garage: College Point Depot
- Vehicle: New Flyer C40LF CNG (local routes); Motor Coach Industries D4500CL; Prevost X3-45 (express routes)
- Began service: 1951 (Q65A); 1971 (QM4); 2016 (QM44); 2025 (Q74)

Route
- Locale: Queens, New York, U.S.
- Communities served: Forest Hills, Kew Gardens Hills, Electchester, Fresh Meadows, Oakland Gardens, Bayside
- Start: Electchester, Queens – Jewel Avenue and 164th Street (Q64); Bayside, Queens – Queensborough Community College (Q74); Electchester, Queens – Horace Harding Expressway and 164th Street (QM4, QM44)
- Via: Jewel Avenue (Q64, Q74); 164th Street, Horace Harding Expressway (Q74); Sixth Avenue, Queensboro Bridge, Queens Boulevard, Jewel Avenue (QM4 Eastbound); Sixth Avenue, Midtown Tunnel, Long Island Expressway, Queens Boulevard (QM4 Westbound); Third Avenue, Queensboro Bridge, Queens Boulevard, Jewel Avenue (QM44 Eastbound); Third Avenue, Midtown Tunnel, Long Island Expressway, Queens Boulevard (QM44 Westbound)
- End: Forest Hills, Queens – Queens Boulevard and 71st Avenue, Forest Hills–71st Avenue station (Q64, Q74); Midtown Manhattan –Sixth Avenue and 36th Street (QM4 First Stop to Queens); Midtown Manhattan –Third Avenue and 39th Street (QM44 First Stop to Queens); Midtown Manhattan –Third Avenue and 57th Street (QM4 Last Stop); Midtown Manhattan –Third Avenue and 56th Street (QM44 Last Stop)
- Length: 2.7 mi (4.3 km) (Q64); 6.1 mi (9.8 km) (Q74); 11.7 mi (18.8 km) (QM4); 11 mi (18 km) (QM44)

Service
- Operates: 24 hours (Q64); All times except late nights (Q74, QM4); Rush hours in the peak direction (QM44)
- Annual patronage: Q64: 1,841,471 (2025); Q74: 381,211 (2025); QM4/QM44: 154,236 (2025)
- Transfers: Yes
- Timetable: Q64 Q74 QM4/QM44

The Q64, Q74, QM4 and QM44 bus routes constitute a public transit line in Queens, New York City. The east-to-west Q64 route runs primarily on Jewel Avenue operating between the Forest Hills–71st Avenue subway station in Forest Hills and 164th Street in Electchester. The Q74 limited-stop route parallels the Q64 between the Forest Hills–71st Avenue station and 164th Street, before continuing north and east to Queensborough Community College in Bayside, Queens. The QM4 route is an express bus route running from Midtown Manhattan to Electchester running via Sixth Avenue in Manhattan and Jewel Avenue in Queens. The QM44 route is an express bus route running from Midtown Manhattan to Electchester via Third Avenue in Manhattan and Jewel Avenue in Queens.

The Q64 (formerly the Q65A), QM4 and QM44 were originally operated by Queens-Nassau Transit Lines, Queens Transit Corporation, and Queens Surface Corporation from 1951 to 2005; they are now operated by MTA Regional Bus Operations under the MTA Bus Company brand.

== Route description and service ==
=== Q64 ===
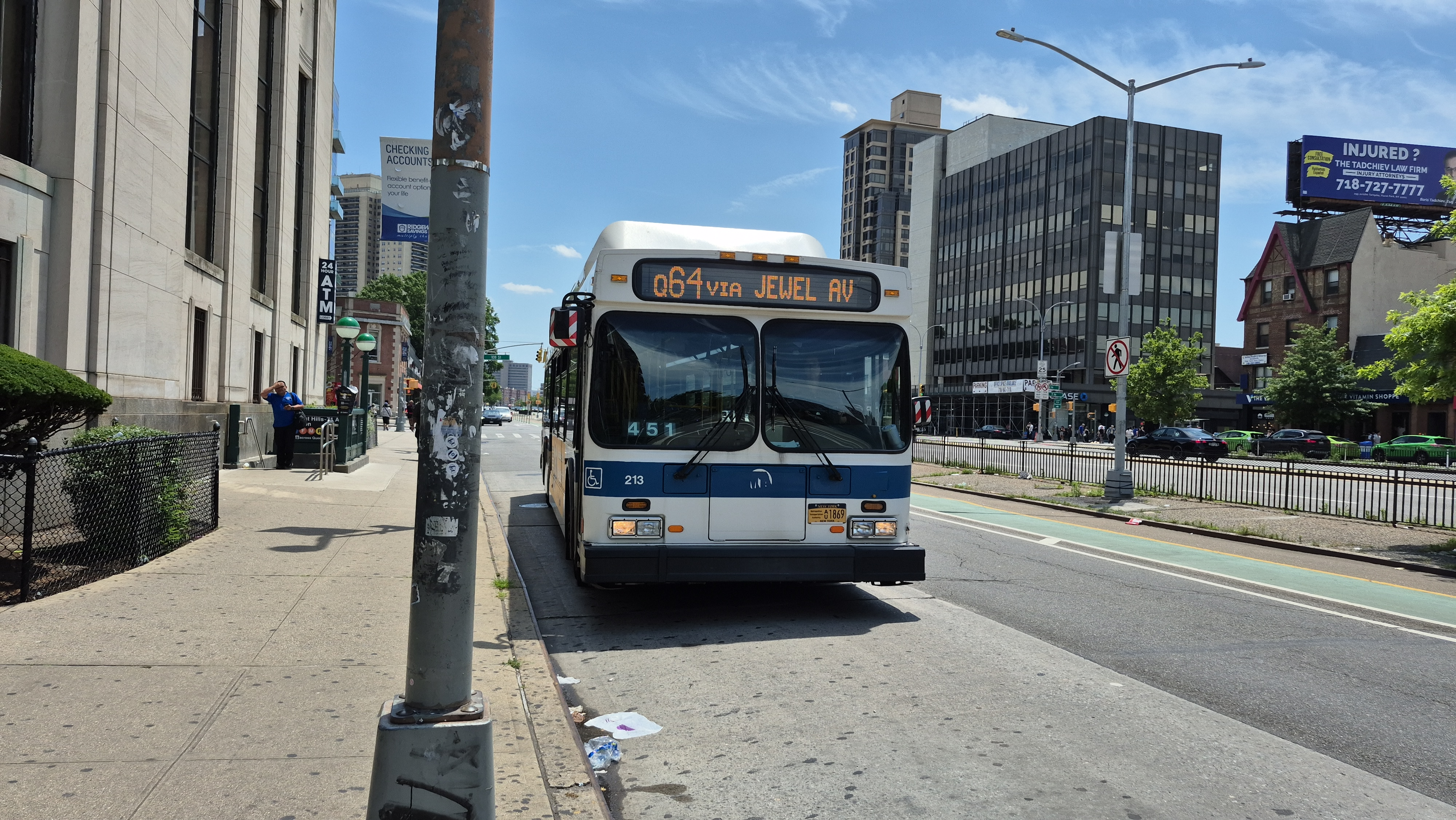
A 2011 New Flyer C40LF CNG (213) on the Q64

The eastbound Q64 starts at the Forest Hills–71st Avenue subway station in Forest Hills on the north side of Queens Boulevard at 71st Avenue. Then the bus route turns onto Jewel Avenue, crossing over the Grand Central Parkway, Flushing Meadows – Corona Park, and Van Wyck Expressway. The bus then travels through Kew Gardens Hills, Queens, and passes by Queens College. Eastbound buses turn south onto Parsons Boulevard, then run east along 71st Avenue, terminating at 164th Street. Buses lay over on the east side of 164th Street before reentering service on Jewel Avenue.

The westbound Q64 essentially follows the same route until just west of the Van Wyck Expressway, where the westbound Q64 turns slightly north onto 69th Road, which runs parallel to Jewel Avenue. The westbound Q64 continues along 69th Road until the intersection with 108th Street, where buses turn left and continue four blocks to Queens Boulevard. Buses lay over at the west side of 108th Street between Queens Boulevard and 70th Road.

=== Q74 ===
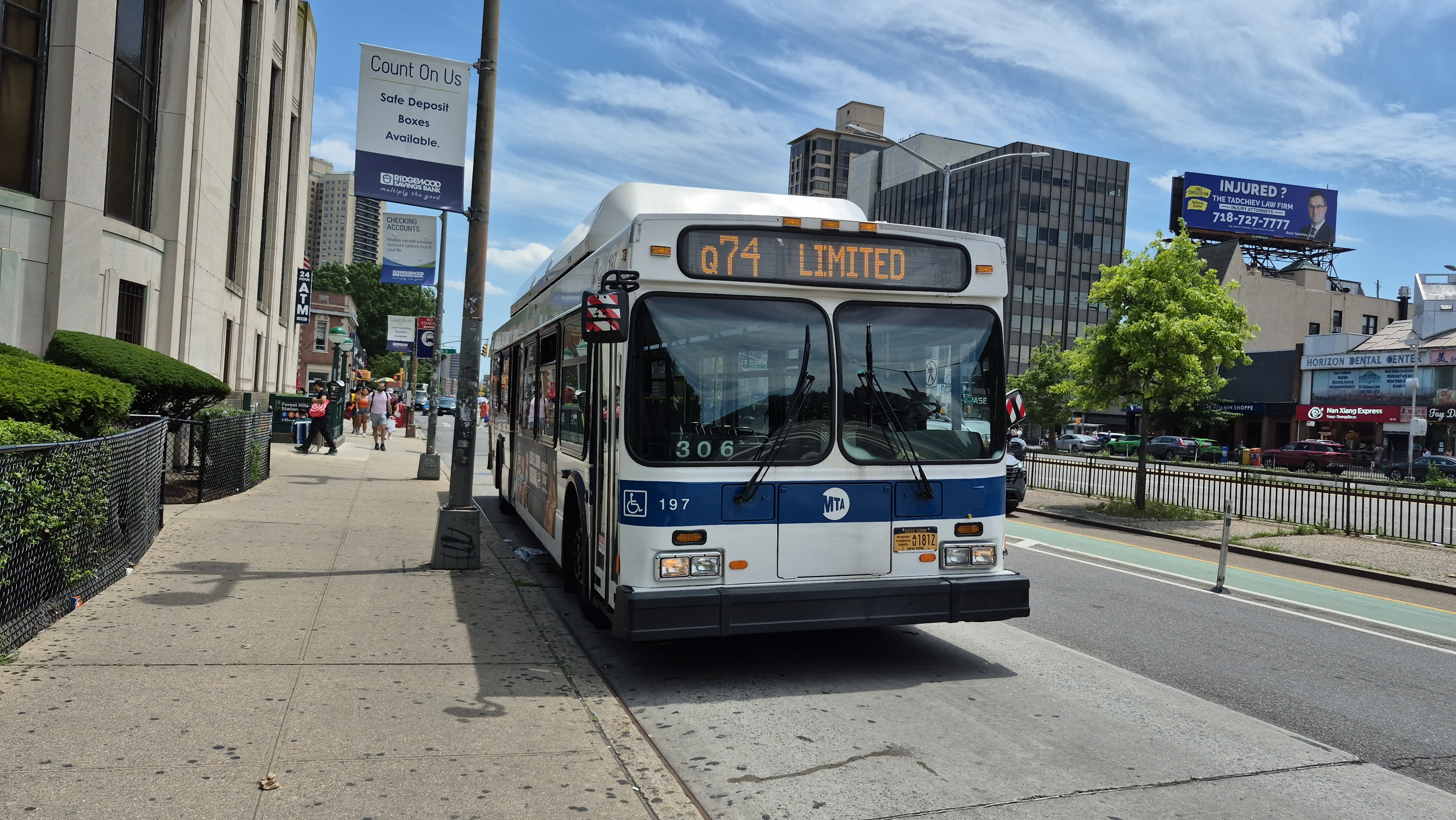
A 2011 New Flyer C40LF CNG (197) on the Q74 Limited

The eastbound Q74 is a limited-stop route, starting at the Forest Hills–71st Avenue subway station in Forest Hills on the north side of Queens Boulevard at 71st Avenue. Then the bus route turns onto Jewel Avenue, crossing over the Grand Central Parkway, Flushing Meadows – Corona Park, and Van Wyck Expressway. The bus then travels through Kew Gardens Hills, Queens, and passes by Queens College before turning north at 164th Street. It then turns east at Horace Harding Expressway, continuing to Springfield Boulevard, where it turns north again. The Q74 terminates at Queensborough Community College in Bayside, Queens.

The westbound Q74 essentially follows the same route until just west of the Van Wyck Expressway, where the westbound Q74 turns slightly north onto 69th Road, which runs parallel to Jewel Avenue. The westbound Q74 continues along 69th Road until the intersection with 108th Street, where buses turn left and continue four blocks to Queens Boulevard. Buses lay over at the west side of 108th Street between Queens Boulevard and 70th Road.

=== QM4 ===
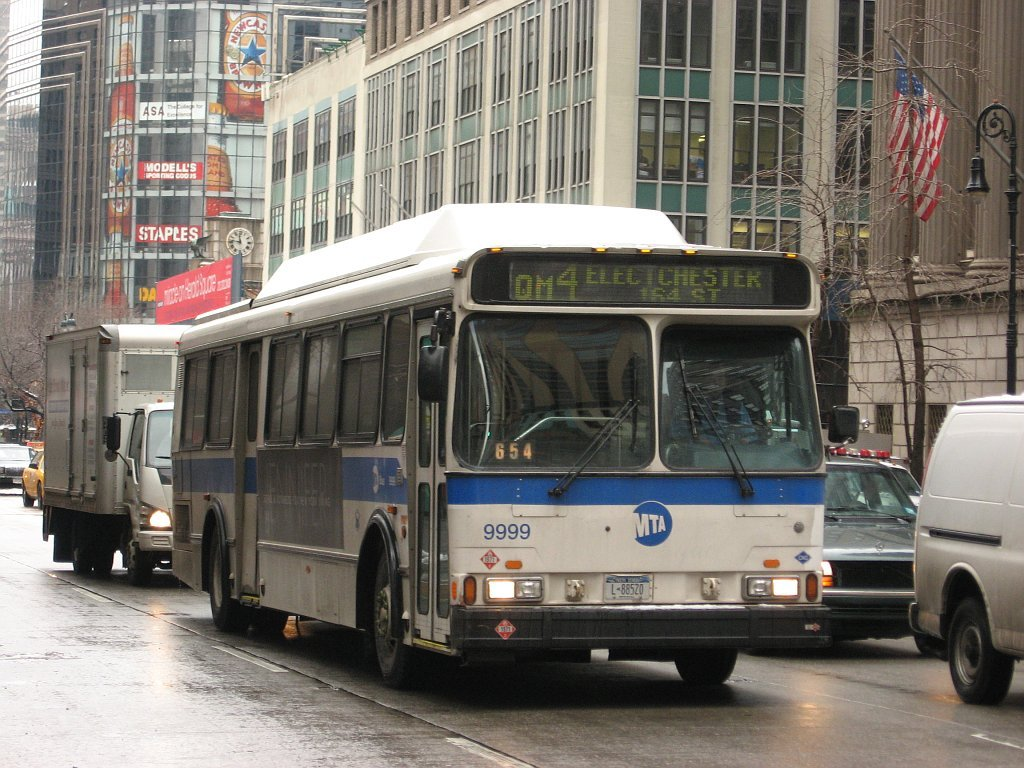
A 1998 Orion V CNG bus (9999) from the former Queens Surface Orion V CNG in Manhattan on the QM4 to Electchester, Queens.

Eastbound QM4 service via Sixth Avenue begins at Sixth Avenue and 36th Street. The route then picks up passengers along Sixth Avenue. Sixth Avenue service turns onto 57th Street. Afterwards, the service moves onto 59th Street, and then turns onto the Queensboro Bridge crossing over the East River into Queens. Once in Queens, the bus continues along Queens Boulevard making no stops until it reaches Jewel Avenue. The bus drops off passengers along Jewel Avenue, and turns onto 164th Street, with its final stop at the Horace Harding Expressway.

Westbound QM4 service begins at 164th Street and the Horace Harding Expressway, and then turns onto Jewel Avenue picking up passengers. Once the route reaches Queens Boulevard, the bus stops picking up passengers. The bus route then continues via Queens Boulevard until it turns onto the Long Island Expressway. It then goes under the East River through the Queens Midtown Tunnel. Once in Manhattan the bus goes via Sixth Avenue. The bus drops off passengers and then turns via 57th Street, terminating at Third Avenue.

=== QM44 ===
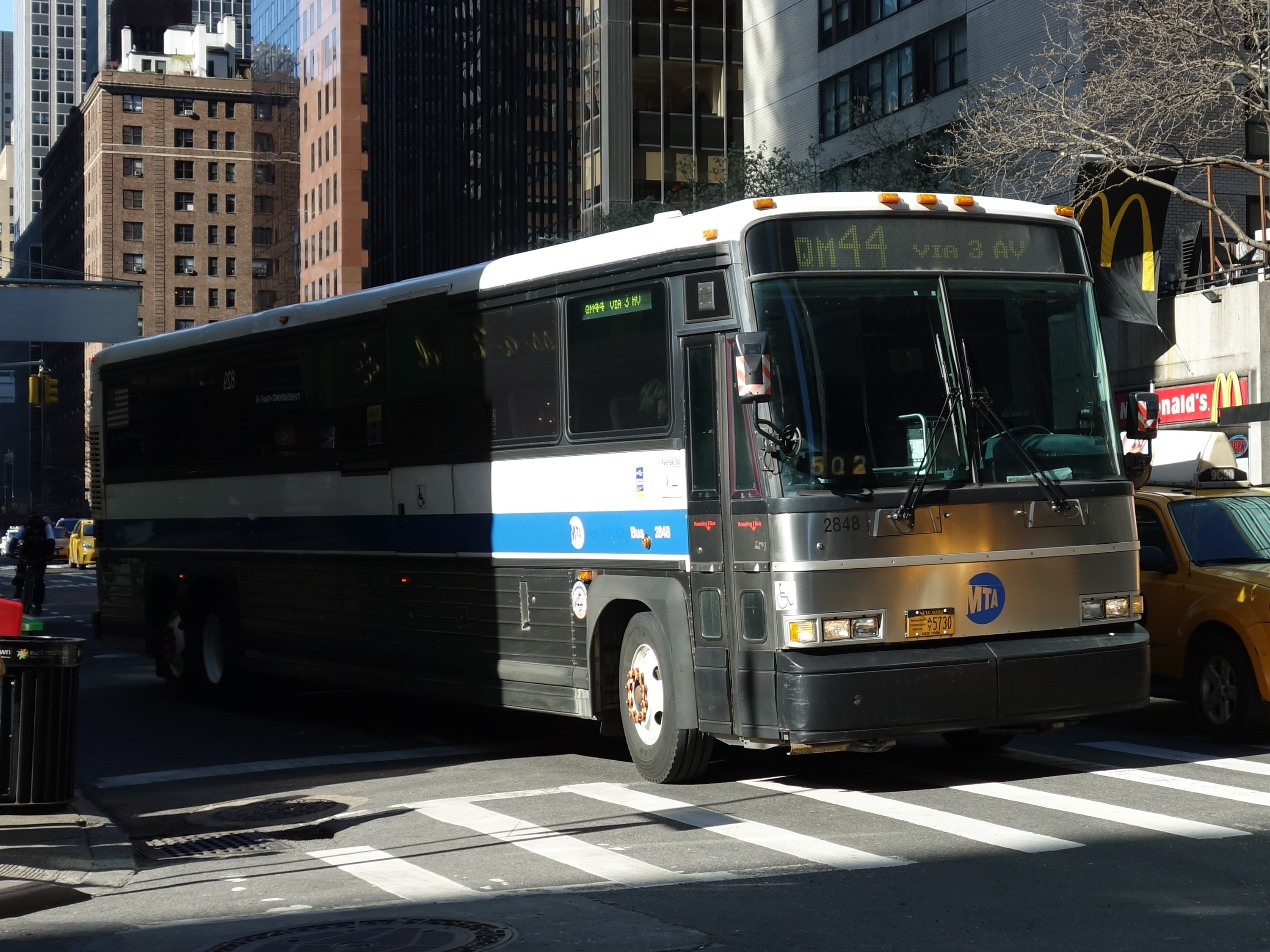
A 2002 Motor Coach D4500 (2848) on the East Midtown-bound QM44 at 51st Street & 3rd Avenue in Midtown

Eastbound QM44 service begins at Third Avenue and 39th Street. The route then picks up passengers along Third Avenue. Afterwards, the service moves onto 59th Street, and then turns onto the Queensboro Bridge crossing over the East River into Queens. Once in Queens, the bus continues along Queens Boulevard making no stops until it reaches Jewel Avenue. The bus drops off passengers along Jewel Avenue, and turns onto 164th Street, with its final stop at the Horace Harding Expressway.

Westbound QM44 service begins at 164th Street and the Horace Harding Expressway, and then turns onto Jewel Avenue picking up passengers. Once the route reaches Queens Boulevard, the bus stops picking up passengers. The bus route then continues via Queens Boulevard until it turns onto the Long Island Expressway. It then goes under the East River through the Queens Midtown Tunnel. Once in Manhattan the bus goes via Third Avenue until its last stop at 56th Street.

QM44 service only operates during rush hours in the peak direction.

== History ==
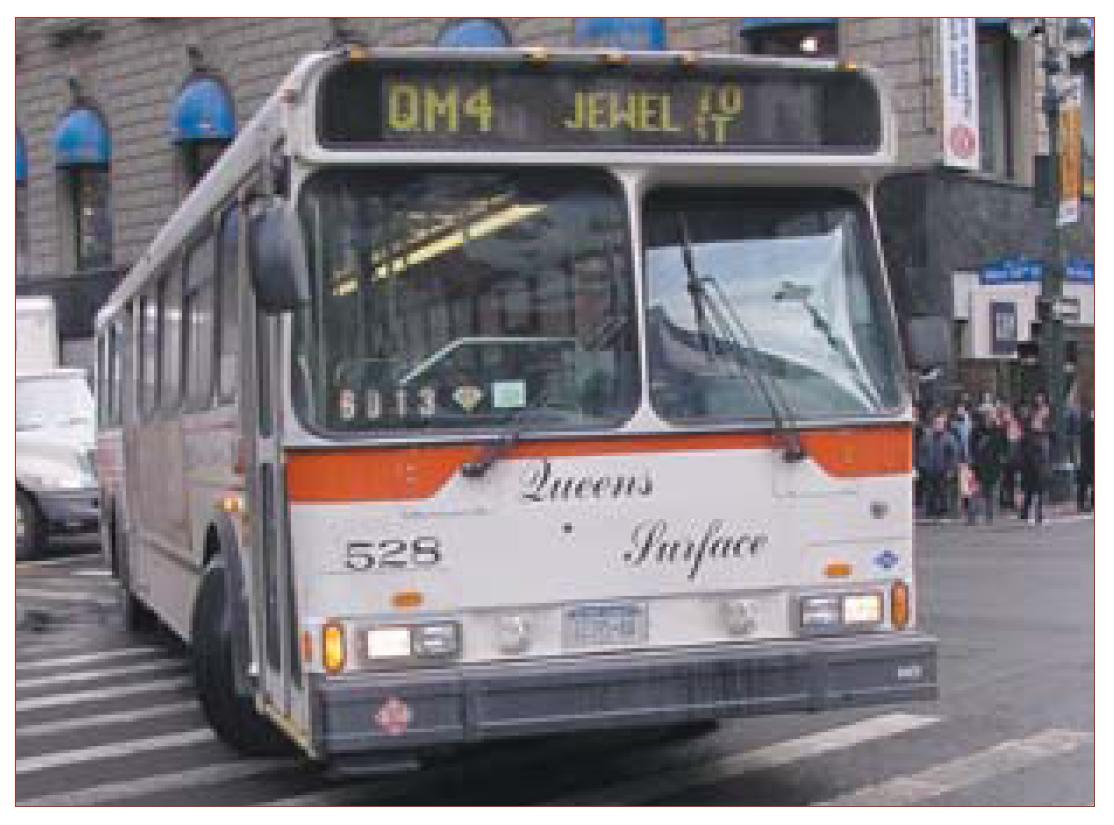
A 1996 Orion V (528) on the QM4 under Queens Surface operation in Midtown Manhattan.

In November 1949, the Queens Valley Home Owners' Association of Kew Gardens Hills proposed an extension of the city's Q44 Vleigh Place shuttle bus (later the Q74) west from its northern terminus at Jewel Avenue and Main Street to the 71st–Continental Avenues subway station of the IND Queens Boulevard Line in Forest Hills, to give Kew Gardens Hills additional bus service. It would have created a loop service between the 71st Avenue station and the nearby Kew Gardens–Union Turnpike station on the same line, running via Main Street. The proposed route was numbered Q75.

The Q75 proposal was submitted to the New York City Board of Transportation on March 20, 1951. On June 19, transit officials informed the Board of Estimate it would not be advisable to extend that route. In response, Queens–Nassau Transit (the predecessor to the Queens Surface Corporation) proposed that the Q65A bus run along the entire length of Jewel Avenue between 164th Street to the 71st Avenue station at Queens Boulevard. In an alternate proposal, Queens–Nassau Transit proposed having the route terminate at the 75th Avenue subway station, between the 71st Avenue and Union Turnpike stops. The Q65A's introduction was also meant to help alleviate congestion at the Union Turnpike subway station. The Queens Valley Association opposed the Q65A proposal, due to it only serving the northern portion of Kew Gardens Hills. It also opposed placing the terminus at the 75th Avenue station, since 75th Avenue only serves local trains, while 71st Avenue and Kew Gardens–Union Turnpike serve both local and express trains.

The Board of Estimate approved Queens-Nassau Transit's proposal on August 17, 1951. On November 14, 1951, bus service began on the Q65A. The route was originally a spur of the Q65, for which the bus route was named. On August 2, 1953, the Q65A's terminal route was changed. Originally, the Q65A bus traveled east on Jewel Avenue all the way to 164th Street, until it made a loop and reversed direction at 165th Street. The route was changed so that buses would turn south on Parsons Boulevard, east on 71st Avenue, and then north on 164th Street to the terminus at Jewel Avenue; this routing is still used by the current Q64 bus. The change was met with resentment from the local community due to concerns that buses would hit kids outside the newly opened Public School 200 at 164th Street and 71st Avenue. Queens-Nassau became the Queens Transit Corporation in 1957.

In 1964, City Councilman Seymour Boyers of Flushing proposed extending the Q65A to 188th Street and 73rd Avenue, via 164th Street and 73rd Avenue. The proposed extension would have provided additional access to Queens College, providing an alternate route to the Q17, would provide an access route to the World's Fair, and it would provide access to the IND subway station at 71st Avenue, which would have relieved congestion at the Kew Gardens–Union Turnpike subway station.

Queens Transit Corporation began operating the QM4 on August 16, 1971. The route was not originally given a number, and was instead called the Jewel Avenue–Flushing/Hillcrest Express. Originally some buses started at Kissena Boulevard instead of at the Long Island Expressway. The bus company became Queens-Steinway Transit Corporation in 1986, before finally becoming Queens Surface Corporation in 1988.

=== MTA takeover ===
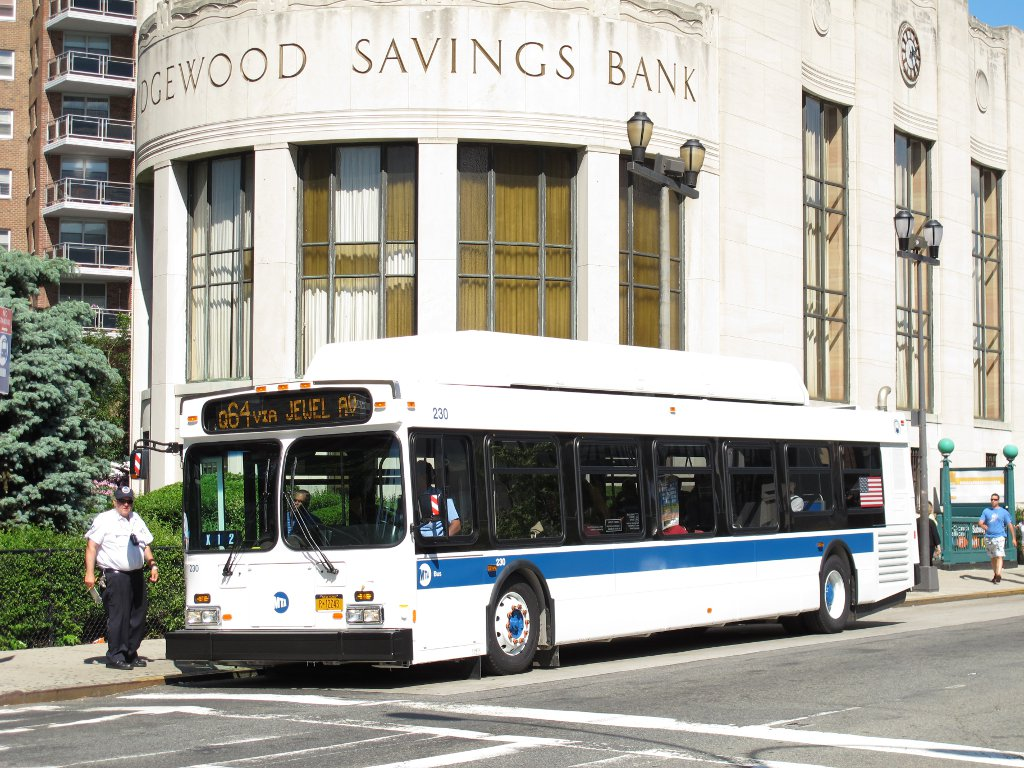
A 2011 C40LF (230) on the Electchester-bound Q64 at Forest Hills’ Ridgewood Savings Bank in 2011.

On February 27, 2005, the MTA Bus Company took over the operations of the Queens Surface routes as part of the city's takeover of all the remaining privately operated bus routes. On September 2, 2007, the Q65A was renumbered to the Q64. On September 8, 2013, overnight service was added, making the Q64 a 24/7 bus route and eliminating the 90 minute gap in service between 2:30 AM and 4:00 AM.

On July 5, 2016, the branch of the QM4 along Third Avenue was relabeled as the QM44 as part of the renumbering of Queens express routes' Third Avenue branches.

=== Queens bus redesign ===
In December 2019, the MTA released a draft redesign of the Queens bus network. As part of the redesign, the Q10 and Q64 buses would have been replaced by a high-density "intra-borough" route, the QT14, running from Electchester to the Lefferts Boulevard station of the AirTrain JFK. The QM4 and QM44 would have been replaced by one express route, the QMT162. The redesign was delayed due to the COVID-19 pandemic in New York City in 2020, and the original draft plan was dropped due to negative feedback.

A revised plan was released in March 2022. As part of the new plan, the Q64 would be discontinued, but the Q10 would be extended to Electchester along the Q64's route, using the same path as the QT14. The QM4 and QM44 would remain with only minor changes to their non-stop sections.

A final bus-redesign plan was released in December 2023. The final plan called for the Q10 and Q64 to remain separate routes; although the Q64's routing would remain unchanged, there would be modifications to stop spacing and headways. The QM4 and QM44 would retain their existing routings, with only changes to stop spacings and frequencies.

On December 17, 2024, addendums to the final plan were released. The final plan included splitting the Q64 into two routes: a local Q64 route, which retains the existing Q64's routing, and a limited-stop Q74 route, which runs between the Forest Hills subway station and Queensborough Community College. Bus stops on the QM4 were rearranged. On January 29, 2025, the current plan was approved by the MTA Board, and the Queens Bus Redesign went into effect in two different phases during Summer 2025. All routes were part of Phase I, which started on June 29, 2025, but the QM44 changes took effect on June 30 because it was a weekday-only route.

== See also ==
- Queens Surface Corporation
- Q23, Q60 (at Queens Boulevard)
- Q20, Q44 SBS (at Main Street)
- Q25 (at Kissena Boulevard)
- Q65 (at 164th Street)

=== Q74 only ===
- Q17 (at Horace Harding Expressway)
- Q30, Q31, Q75 (at Utopia Parkway)
- Q26, Q76 (at Hollis Court/Francis Lewis Boulevards)
- Q27, Q30 (at Springfield Boulevard)
