= Queens Gateway to Health Sciences Secondary School =

Public school in New York City

Location
- 160-20 Goethals Avenue; Jamaica, Queens, New York 11432; United States; 40°43′06″N 73°48′21″W

Information
- School district: 28
- Principal: Judy Henry
- Grades: 6–12
- Gender: 42% male : 58% female
- Age: 11 to 18
- Enrollment: 679 (2025-2026)
  - Grade 6: 92
  - Grade 7: 93
  - Grade 8: 84
  - Grade 9: 116
  - Grade 10: 101
  - Grade 11: 111
  - Grade 12: 80
- Average class size: 32
- Team name: Gladiators
- Website: www.queensgateway.org

Queens Gateway to Health Sciences Secondary School (Q680 or JHS/HS 680) is a school in the New York City borough of Queens which places emphasis on the health sciences. The school serves grades 6–12. Previously co-located in other school buildings, the school moved to its current building for the 2010–11 school year.

== Building ==
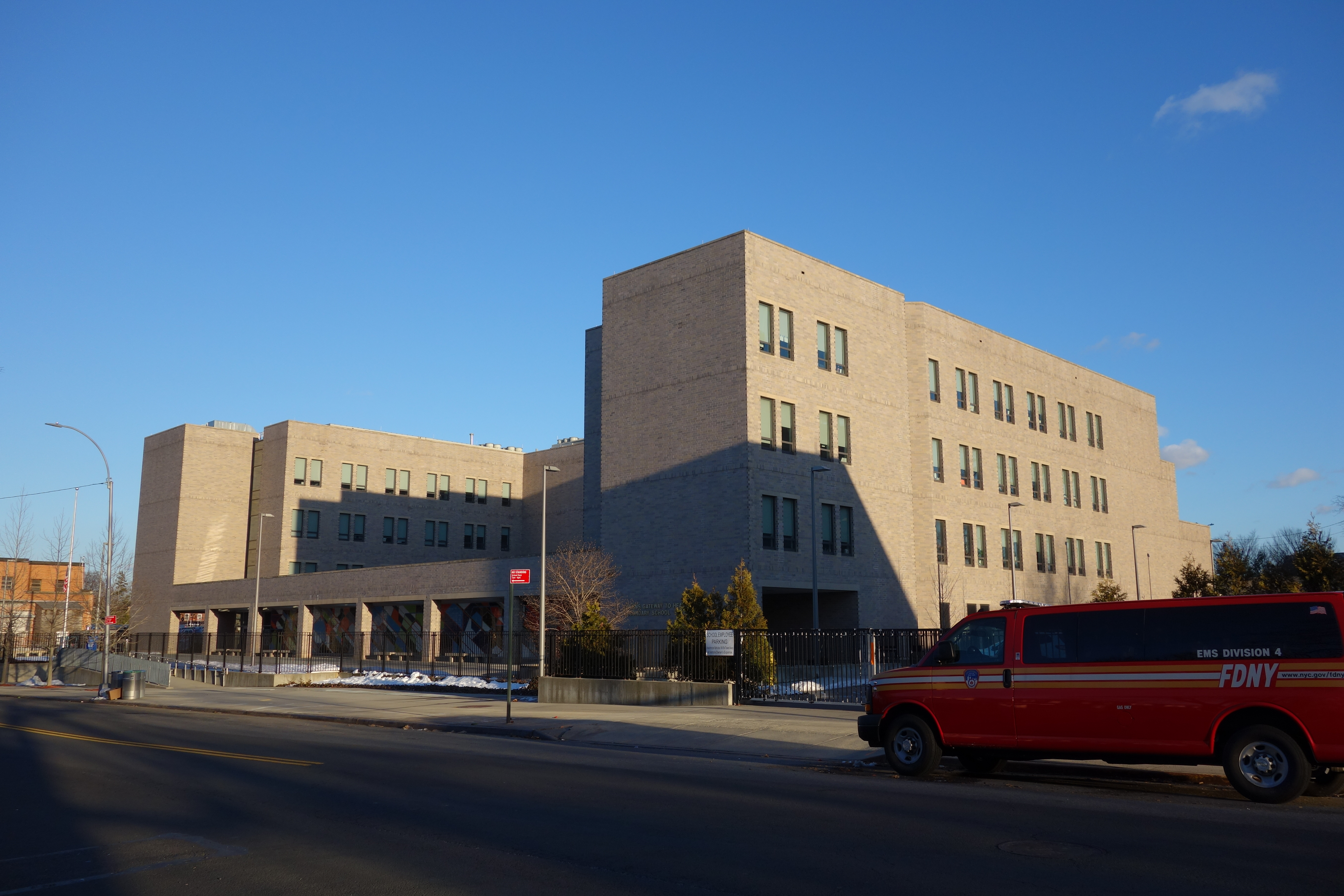
Looking west at the school

The current Queens Gateway building (building Q695) is located in the neighborhood of Hillcrest, Queens on the south side of Goethals Avenue between 160th Street to the west and 161st Street to the east. It is located at the north end of the Queens Hospital Center campus, which extends west to Parsons Boulevard, east to 164th Street, and south to the Grand Central Parkway. Adjacent to the east of the school is Queens Hospital Center's power plant, built in 1932. Adjacent to the west is FDNY EMS Station 50. Located in School District 28, the building has a capacity of 805 students. The building also houses a branch of the Queens Transition Center (Q752), a special education school.

The building was designed by Pei Cobb Freed & Partners and built by the New York City School Construction Authority. It is four stories high with a basement, occupying 64,800 square feet (6,020 m^{2}) square feet of space. The outer facade of the building consists of light-colored brick. The building is U-shaped, with the U opening towards the front of the building at Goethals Avenue. The school's gymnasium occupies the center of the U in the basement and first floor. Skylights on the roof of the gym allow natural light into the building. A colonnade or arcade runs along the first floor in front of the building. Along the wall of the colonnade is a mural created by Sarah Morris. Skylights are also present on the roof of the colonnade. Among the building's facilities include 24 classrooms, 11 science labs, a 297-seat auditorium, cafeterias for students and teachers, a library, and an art studio. At the west end of the school is a 50-car parking lot.

Originally located on the site of the school was the hospital's morgue, with several other hospital buildings adjacent to it. The morgue was relocated to the north side of the campus in order to make room for the school.

Until the opening of its current building, Queens Gateway was located in the former Jamaica Jewish Center on 87th Road near Parsons Boulevard and Hillside Avenue in Briarwood, across from Hillcrest High School. Another school, the Young Women's Leadership School of Queens, was moved into this building in 2010 following the relocation of Queens Gateway.

=== Transportation ===
The Q65 bus route runs north-to-south along 164th Street on the east side of the Queens Hospital campus. The Q25 bus runs along Parsons Boulevard at the west end of the campus. The Q46 bus runs along Union Turnpike one block north of the school. The closest New York City Subway stations are the Parsons Boulevard station of the IND Queens Boulevard Line on Hillside Avenue to the south, connected by the Q25 and Q65, and the Kew Gardens–Union Turnpike station to the west connected by the Q46. The Q25 and Q65 routes also connect with the Jamaica Center–Parsons/Archer subway station on Parsons and Archer Avenues, and the Sutphin Boulevard–Archer Avenue–JFK Airport subway and Jamaica Long Island Rail Road stations on Supthin Boulevard and Archer Avenue.

== School description ==
=== Admissions ===
Admission to the middle school (grades 6–8) at Queens Gateway is limited to students of Queens Districts 28 and 29, based on New York State standardized test scores, attendance and previous report cards. District 28 includes the neighborhoods of Rego Park, Forest Hills, Kew Gardens, Briarwood, Hillcrest, Jamaica Hills, Jamaica, and South Jamaica; portions of Richmond Hill, and South Ozone Park; and the Rochdale Village development. District 29 contains Queens Village, St. Albans, Cambria Heights, Laurelton, Rosedale, and Springfield Gardens. Admission for 9th and 10th graders is open to all New York City residents, with priority to continuing students, then to residents of Districts 28 and 29.

=== Academics, programs and partnerships ===
The school offers numerous Advanced Placement (AP) courses in both science and humanities topics. Middle school students are offered accelerated math and science courses. 9th through 11th graders are required to take the PSAT annually, with the school providing PSAT and SAT prep courses. The school also has an After School Program. Other programs include CUNY College Now and GEAR UP.

The school has partnerships with Icahn School of Medicine at Mount Sinai, Gateway Institute, Queens Hospital Center (QHC), York College, Queens College, and Weill Cornell Medicine. As part of the Mount Sinai/Queens Hospital partnership, students intern at Queens Hospital Center and take part in rotations.

=== Athletics ===
The high school fields several sports teams competing in the Public Schools Athletic League (PSAL), including basketball, rugby, soccer, girls' track and field, and girls' volleyball. The school also offers intramural sports, including basketball, soccer, floor hockey, and table tennis. The middle school had previously participated in the CHAMPS (Cooperative, Healthy, Active, Motivated, Positive Students) athletic league.

== Community relations and institutional history ==
=== Building opposition and environmental concerns ===
Between 2003 and 2007, the plan to construct the permanent Goethals Avenue building faced substantial resistance from local residents and community leaders. Members of Queens Community Board 8Queens Community Board 8 unanimously vetoed the construction proposal in April 2007, citing concerns over a projected surge in pedestrian and automobile traffic, severe strain on public mass transit, and a loss of neighborhood parking. Additionally, Environmental impact assessment conducted during this period by the State Department of Environmental Conservation revealed localized petroleum and formaldehyde contamination originating from an adjacent ambulance refueling station and the old hospital morgue. Despite these community and environmental objections, the project moved forward after securing official approval from the New York City Council in June 2007.

=== Internal leadership and staff feedback ===
During the long-term administration of Principal Judy Henry, the school encountered persistent friction regarding internal and Educational management. Annual New York City School Survey results frequently highlighted structural divisions between the faculty and administration. Over several academic cycles, teacher approval ratings concerning administrative efficiency, trust, and school leadership remained significantly below the citywide averages, reflecting an ongoing period of institutional strain.

=== Employment litigation ===
The school's administration has also been subject to legal challenges concerning its workplace environment. In 2016, former faculty member Janusz Krzesaj filed a federal lawsuit in the U.S. District Court for the Southern District of New York against Principal Judy Henry, Assistant Principal Luis Santiago, and the New York City Department of Education. The lawsuit alleged discrimination under the Americans with Disabilities Act of 1990 (ADA), First Amendment retaliation, and intentional infliction of emotional distress. While the court dismissed several accompanying claims—including allegations under Title VII and the Age Discrimination in Employment Act (ADEA)—it allowed the retaliation and disability discrimination claims to proceed. The matter was subsequently referred to a magistrate judge for settlement and voluntarily dismissed with prejudice in July 2017.

== History ==
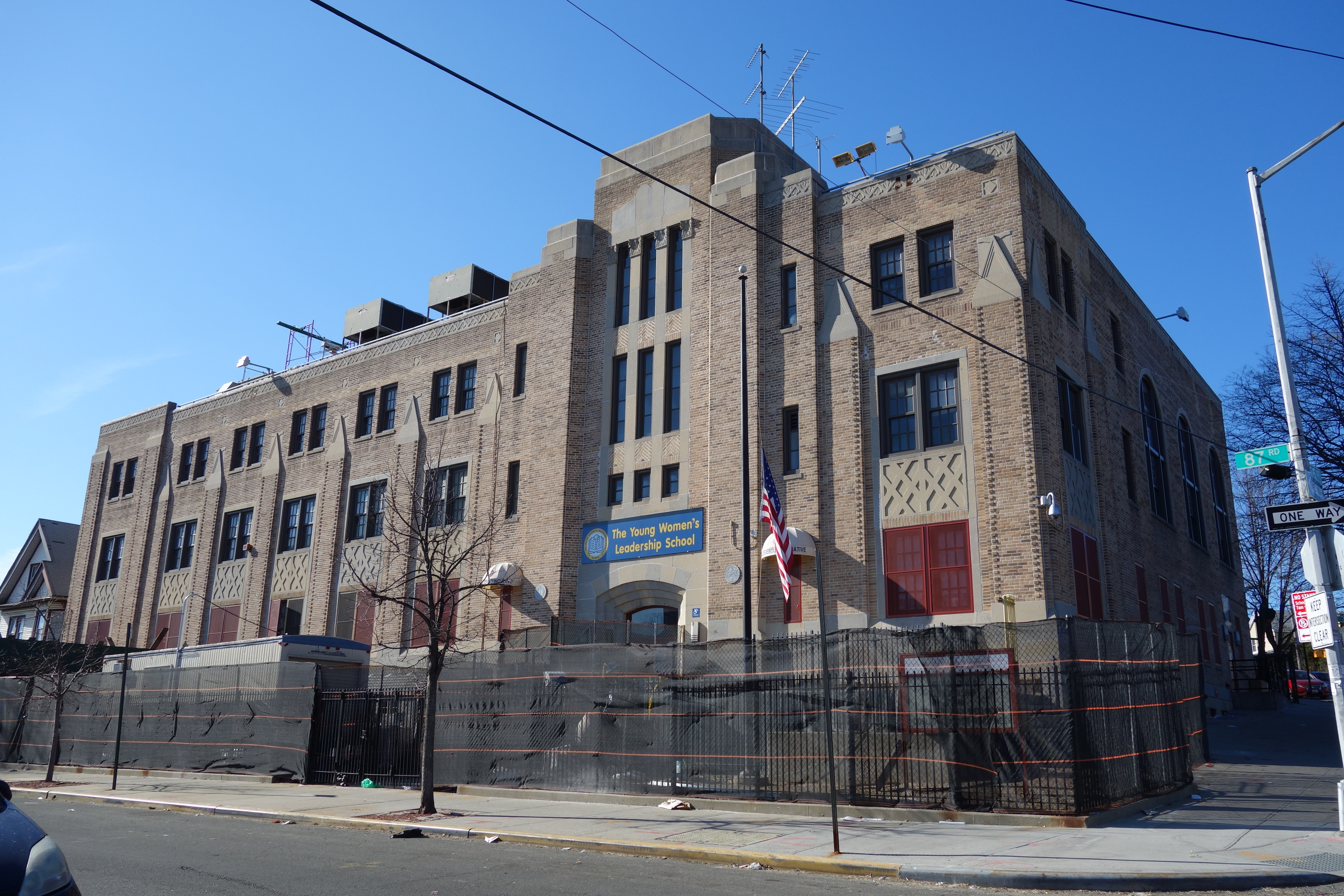
The Jamaica Jewish Center (pictured) was used by Queens Gateway from 1998 to 2010; the building is now used by The Young Women's Leadership School of Queens.

The Gateway to Higher Education program was founded by New York City in September 1986. Queens Gateway Secondary School was opened in 1994 or 1995, in partnership with the Mount Sinai School of Medicine (now the Icahn School of Medicine at Mount Sinai). The school was a product of the Robert Wood Johnson Foundation's Health Professions Partnership Initiative. The school was originally planned to be built on the campus of Queens Hospital Center, but this was deferred due to the city's plans to sell off the hospital. Because of this, the school was initially co-located in the buildings of existing schools. It first was housed in Richard Grossley Junior High School (JHS 8) on Merrick Boulevard in South Jamaica. Due to the roof caving in at JHS 8, the school was then moved to the Catherine and Count Basie School (MS 72) on Guy R. Brewer Boulevard in Rochdale Village until June 1996, when the school returned to JHS 8. On April 4, 1997, Queens Gateway began using three classrooms within Queens Hospital Center. In 1998, the Jamaica Jewish Center was renovated in order to convert it into a school building for Queens Gateway. The school began using the building on September 8, 1998.

In December 2001, the New York City Department of Education (DOE) announced plans to construct a new 800-seat building for Queens Gateway. In 2002, shortly after the completion of the new Queens Hospital Center main building, the DOE sought to acquire a portion of the property to construct a new high school, demolishing now-obsolete hospital buildings. The relocation would allow Queens Gateway students to work with health professionals from QHC. Residents of the local community, however, opposed the plan due to fears of additional pedestrian and automobile traffic, loss of parking, and an increased strain on mass transit and police resources. On April 19, 2007, the members of Queens Community Board 8 (representing Hillcrest) unanimously vetoed the new school's construction. In addition, the site along Goethals Avenue was found to be contaminated with petroleum from an adjacent ambulance refueling station (later replaced by EMS Station 50), as well as formaldehyde leaking from the morgue. Both buildings had been completed in the 1930s along with the original Queens Hospital Center (then-Queens General Hospital). Nevertheless, the school project was approved by the New York City Council on June 15, 2007. In March 2009, the City Council approved the construction of a 50-space parking lot adjacent to the school for employees. The new Queens Gateway building, which cost $70.8 million to construct, opened on September 8, 2010, for the 2010–11 academic year.

As part of the relocation of Queens Gateway, the DOE had also planned a grade reconfiguration, adding sixth grade to the school for the 2010–11 school year. Under this plan, the school would have a maximum enrollment of 805 students. Although supported by the school's principal, the move received negative feedback from staff members who felt the expansion was too abrupt. Parents in the area also criticized the move, as due to the school's enrollment cap it could reduce the number of high school seats available in the school and the area as a whole. Because of this, the expansion was pushed back to the 2011–12 school year.
