= Triboro Hospital for Tuberculosis =

Hospital in Queens, New York

Triboro Hospital
- Queens Hospital Center; NYC Health + Hospitals
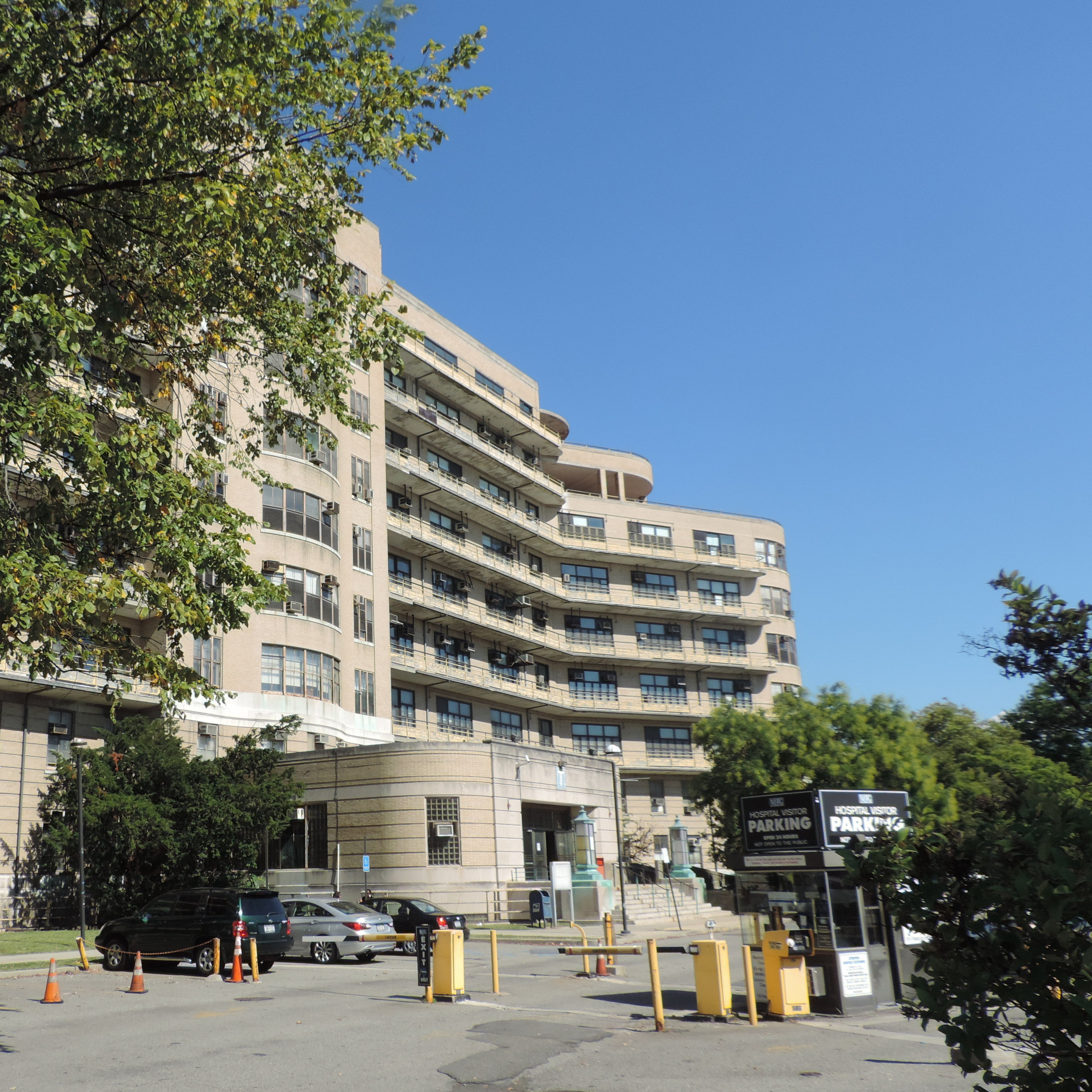

Geography
- Location: 161-25 Parsons Boulevard, Jamaica, New York City, New York, United States
- Coordinates: 40.717318°N 73.807760°W

Organization
- Type: Tuberculosis hospital (former)

History
- Founded: January 2, 1941
- Closed: Circa 2000

Links
- Website: www.nychealthandhospitals.org/queens/
- Lists: Hospitals in New York State
- Other links: Hospitals in Queens
- Triboro Hospital for Tuberculosis
- U.S. National Register of Historic Places
- Architects: John Russell Pope, Eggers & Higgins
- Architectural style: Art Moderne
- NRHP reference No.: 100003397
- Added to NRHP: January 31, 2019

Triboro Hospital for Tuberculosis or Triboro Tuberculosis Hospital, later simply Triboro Hospital and now known as "Building T" or the "T Building", is a former municipal tuberculosis sanatorium and later a general hospital located on the campus of Queens Hospital Center in Jamaica, Queens, New York City. Completed in 1941, it was merged with the adjacent Queens General Hospital to form Queens Hospital Center in the 1950s, and converted into a general hospital by the 1970s. Now primarily used for administrative purposes, several plans have been proposed to reuse the site, or to preserve the building as a historic landmark. On January 31, 2019 the hospital was listed on the National Register of Historic Places.

== Description ==
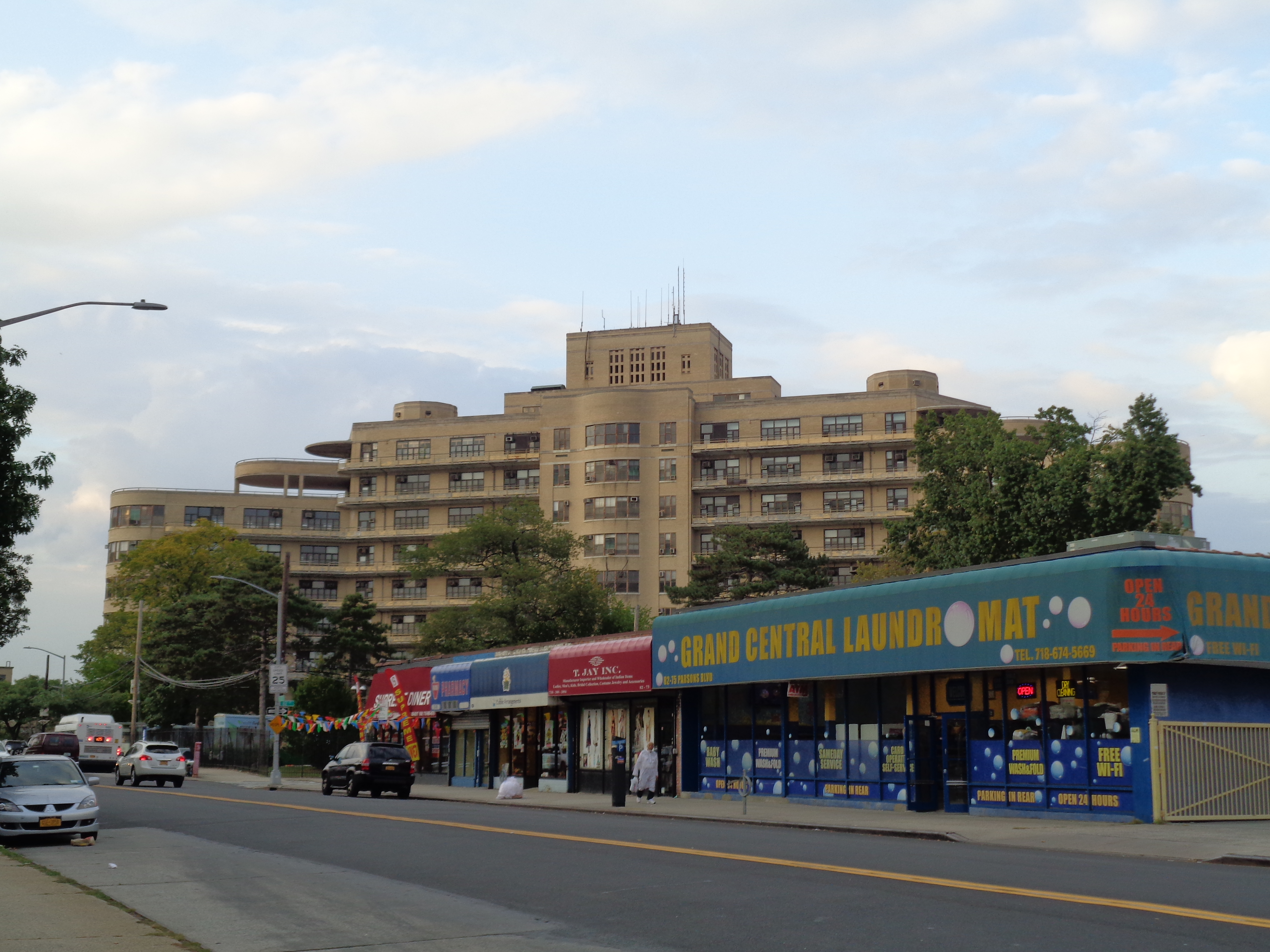
Triboro Hospital overlooking the surrounding neighborhood

Triboro Hospital is located the at the west end of the Queens Hospital Center campus on Parsons Boulevard between 82nd Drive and Goethals Avenue. It is located at the top of a hill, part of the terminal moraine that runs west-to-east across Long Island. The building was designed by architect John Russell Pope, and later by the Eggers & Higgins firm after Pope's death, in Art Moderne-style. New York City Commissioner of Hospitals Dr. Sigismund Goldwater and Department of Public Works architect Isadore Rosenfield supervised the design. The hospital served Queens, as well as Brooklyn and the Bronx.

The building is a total of eleven stories high, with nine floors for patients and two additional mechanical floors. The building was sited at an angle to the north–south grid, with its main entrance facing southwest towards the intersection of Parsons and 82nd Drive. The orientation allowed afternoon sunlight to hit the front of the building. It features one main wing facing southwest, with shorter wings at each end angled inward to fit the property. The hospital was built with a patient capacity of over 500 with six-bed hospital wards. It was designed with numerous windows and glass interior walls, glass-enclosed sunrooms or solariums, and cantilever balconies, all to maximize natural light entering the facility and exposure of patients to the sun. Each floor of the hospital had three sunrooms. Its basement was built with locker, dining, and storage facilities, along with a tunnel connecting to the then-Queens General Hospital buildings. Triboro Hospital's outer design has a "symmetrical facade and a minimum of ornamentation," utilizing gray brick and limestone trim. It was built with four elevators installed by the Otis Elevator Company.

The T Building is currently used by Queens Hospital Center for administrative offices, storage, and clinic and psychiatric services. Several clinics were relocated to "The Pavilion" of QHC when it opened in 2007. More services have been relocated from the T Building since then, due to the deteriorating condition of the building.

=== Transportation ===
The Q25 and Q34 buses run along Parsons Boulevard, directly serving Building T. The Q65 bus route runs north-to-south along 164th Street on the east side of the Queens Hospital campus, serving the main buildings. The Q46 bus runs along Union Turnpike several blocks north of the hospital grounds. The closest New York City Subway stations are the Parsons Boulevard station of the IND Queens Boulevard Line on Hillside Avenue to the south, connected by the Q25, Q34, and Q65, and the Kew Gardens–Union Turnpike station to the west connected by the Q46. The Q25, Q34, and Q65 routes also connect with the Jamaica Center–Parsons/Archer subway station on Parsons and Archer Avenues, and the Sutphin Boulevard–Archer Avenue–JFK Airport subway and Jamaica Long Island Rail Road stations on Supthin Boulevard and Archer Avenue.

== History ==
The 22-acre site of Queens Hospital Center was originally the Haack farm, purchased by the city in 1903. The Queensboro Hospital for Contagious Diseases opened on the property on June 29, 1916. Queens General Hospital was opened on October 30, 1935, and absorbed Queensboro Hospital (later the Queensboro Pavilion) on March 1, 1936.

=== Construction of Triboro Hospital ===
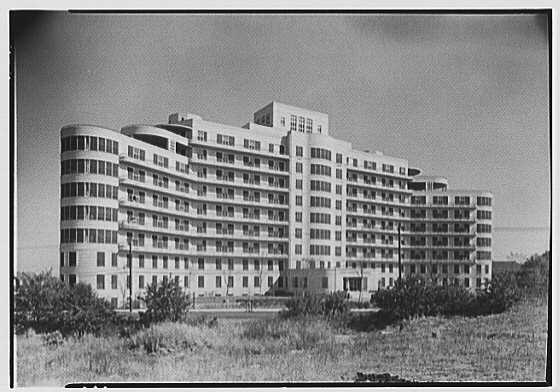
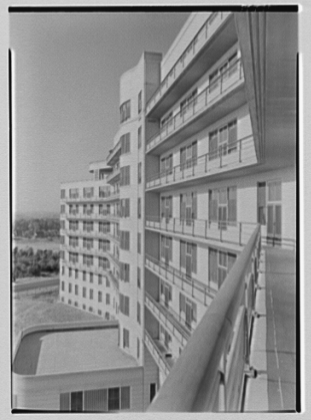
Views of Triboro Hospital circa 1940. Looking from across Parsons Boulevard (left); looking west from a balcony (right).

In 1936, the city planned to construct a new tuberculosis hospital adjacent to Queens General and Queensboro Pavilion, pending funding. The project was approved by the Public Works Administration (PWA). The new hospital would relieve crowding at the Queensboro Pavilion, which treated tuberculosis patients at that time. Architect John Russell Pope began preliminary designs on the hospital in 1937. Groundbreaking on Triboro Hospital took place on August 3, 1938, attended by Mayor Fiorello H. La Guardia. Excavating for the hospital's foundation began on September 29, 1938. The cornerstone for the hospital was laid by Mayor La Guardia on September 28, 1939. The hospital was originally to have been dedicated by President Franklin D. Roosevelt in November 1940, but the president was unable to attend. The hospital was opened by Mayor La Guardia on January 2, 1941. Costing a total of $3.5 million, 40 percent of the cost (around $1.5 million) was defrayed by a grant from the PWA, with the rest of the money coming from the city. Upon opening, three patients were immediately transferred from Queens General to Triboro Hospital. The next day, nine additional patients were transferred from Kings County Hospital in Brooklyn. Patients were also transferred from Bellevue Hospital in Lower Manhattan. The hospital was officially dedicated on January 28, 1941 by La Guardia, who stated that it was designed to be converted into a general hospital "twenty-five years from now."

During the various ceremonies, Mayor La Guardia expressed regret for the conditions that ultimately led to the high prevalence of tuberculosis within New York City, making Triboro Hospital necessary. La Guardia attributed the high rates of the disease to a lack of high-quality housing, and the city not keeping up with modern medicine. During the cornerstone ceremony, he referred to the hospital as "the Hospital of Mistakes of the Past." La Guardia claimed that slum clearance and improved housing programs would eliminate the disease and the need for institutions like Triboro Hospital.

=== Later years ===
In July 1950 Neponsit Beach Hospital, another tuberculosis hospital adjacent to Jacob Riis Park in Neponsit, Rockaway, began operating as an annex of Triboro Hospital, with 24 patients transferred from Triboro to Neponsit. On June 19, 1952, it was announced that Queens General, Queensboro Hospital, and Triboro Hospital would be consolidated into Queens Hospital Center. Three other facilities were also absorbed into the new hospital: Neponsit Beach Hospital; the College Point Outpatient Department, an outpatient dispensary; and the Ozone Park ambulance station. In spite of the unification, Queens General and Triboro Hospital continued to operate largely independent of each other. The College Point dispensary was closed at the end of August 1954, while Neponsit Beach Hospital was closed on April 21, 1955 due to a declining need for tuberculosis treatment. In January 1959, the hospital boards of Queens General and Triboro Hospital were combined to improve efficiency, completing the merger of the hospitals.

By the 1970s, the Triboro Hospital transitioned into a normal hospital within the Queens Hospital complex. At this time, Queens Hospital Center was considered antiquated, with over 90 percent of the hospital beds below state health standards, along with overcrowding of hospital wards and shortages of equipment. The large and open hospital wards with dozens of beds that Queens General and Triboro Hospital were built with were now in violation of modern health codes. An entire corridor of Triboro Hospital had been flooded in 1971 due to a broken faucet. The city sought to relocate Queens Hospital Center farther south in Jamaica or South Jamaica. Meanwhile, it was proposed to sell or close Triboro Hospital. Queens Hospital was not relocated, due to community opposition and the city's fiscal crisis at that time.

In 1994, the Triboro building received a $10 million renovation to convert its third floor into a psychiatric unit. On October 8, 1998, ground broke on the new main building of Queens Hospital Center, replacing the 1930s-era Queens General main building. At this time, four buildings on the campus that were potential historic landmarks were demolished, but the Triboro Hospital building was preserved by a binding covenant. In 1999, a drug rehabilitation program for senior citizens called "It's Never Too Late" was opened in the Triboro building. The new QHC building opened in 2001.

=== Proposals for redevelopment ===
During the construction of the new Queens Hospital, the city sought to sell or redevelop the sites of several now-obsolete buildings, including Triboro Hospital. In 2003, Margaret Tietz Nursing and Rehabilitation Center sought to lease T building. They planned to create a retirement community within the T Building called "Skyline Commons". The project was originally envisioned by the company in 1999. The development would consist of 143 independent living units, 19 units for "enriched housing" (integrated housing for multiple people), and a nursing home. In addition, there would be several recreation rooms, a library, auditorium, restaurant, community center, and a dialysis center. It was promoted as provided apartment-style living, with hotel amenities, and nursing home-style care. The project was approved by New York State Department of Health in August 2007. Skyline Commons was cancelled, however, in January 2009, due to the 2008 financial crisis. Under the plans, 70% of the apartments had to be sold in order to begin construction; only 50 units had been sold by September 2008.

By 2012, the T Building continued to deteriorate, leading Queens Hospital to relocate many services out of the site. $2 million a year was spent on maintenance and utilities for the building. Renovations to bring the building up to proper conditions were estimated to cost $50 million. This would include the removal of asbestos in the building. At this time, QHC sought to lease the building to Comunilife, Inc. in order to create a 251-unit affordable supportive housing complex, which would serve military veterans, people with physical or developmental disabilities, and people with chronic diseases such as diabetes. Patients from QHC and Elmhurst Hospital Center would receive preference in applying for housing in the complex. The plan was opposed by the local community due to fears of increasing crime and disturbances. In January 2014, Queens Community Board 8 (representing Hillcrest) voted to demolish the former Triboro Hospital, in part due to its condition and maintenance costs, but also to prevent the housing plan from moving forward. The decision received opposition from historical preservationists, including 11 architectural conservation groups.

Around 2015, the Dunn Development Corporation of Brooklyn proposed another plan for supportive housing within the T Building. The plan would create 205 units of low-to-middle income housing, 75 of which would be supportive housing for patients of Queens Hospital. In 2015, the company signed a 99-year lease with the city. Like the earlier proposal, this plan also was met with community opposition.

In January 2018, the New York City Council approved plans to renovate Triboro Hospital for use as affordable housing, with 206 units provided in the building. 131 of the units in the T Building would be reserved for middle income tenants. The remaining 75 would be for individuals who make less than 60 percent of the Area Median Income (AMI), including people who were formerly homeless. During this time, several affordable housing developments were being created on NYC Health + Hospitals property. In June 2018, Triboro Hospital was nominated as a potential landmark on the National Register of Historic Places by New York State. On December 18, 2018, the New York City Department of Housing Preservation and Development announced that $18.1 million in housing tax credits would be awarded for the creation and retention of 13 affordable housing developments. This included $3.3 million for the redevelopment of the T Building by Dunn Development Corporation.

== See also ==
- Goldwater Memorial Hospital
