= Parsons Boulevard (disambiguation) =

Parsons Boulevard is a road in Queens, New York.

Parsons Boulevard may also refer to:

- Parsons Boulevard (IND Queens Boulevard Line)
- Jamaica Center–Parsons/Archer (Archer Avenue lines)
