= Neponsit Beach Hospital =

- NYC Health + Hospitals
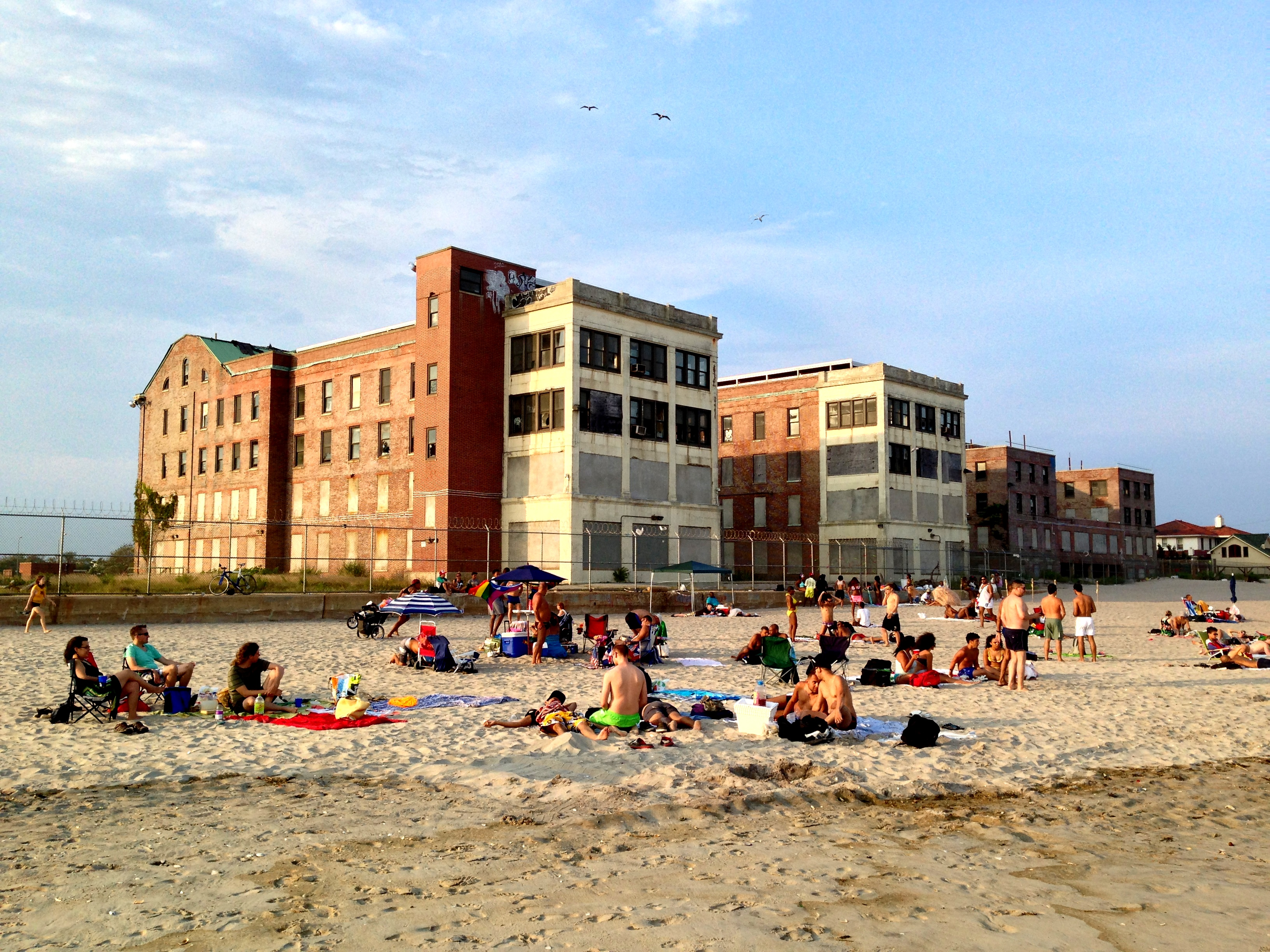

Geography
- Location: 149–25 Rockaway Beach Boulevard, Rockaway, Queens, New York City, New York, United States
- Coordinates: 40.568673°N 73.864740°W

Organization
- Type: Tuberculosis hospital (former); Nursing home (former)

History
- Founded: 1915 (as hospital); 1961 (as nursing home)
- Closed: 1955 (as hospital); 1998 (as nursing home)

Links
- Website: www.nychealthandhospitals.org/queens/
- Lists: Hospitals in New York State
- Other links: Hospitals in Queens

Neponsit Beach Hospital, also known as Neponsit Beach Hospital for Children, Neponsit Hospital, Neponsit Children's Hospital, and various other names, was a former municipal tuberculosis sanatorium located adjacent to Jacob Riis Park and the Neponsit community on the western end of the Rockaway peninsula in Queens, New York City. Originally oriented towards the treatment of children, the hospital treated military veterans during and after World War II, but closed in 1955 due to a declining need for tuberculosis hospitals. Afterwards, it operated as the Neponsit Home for the Aged, later the Neponsit Health Care Center, a city-run nursing home until its controversial closure in 1998. The hospital was demolished in 2023.

== Description ==
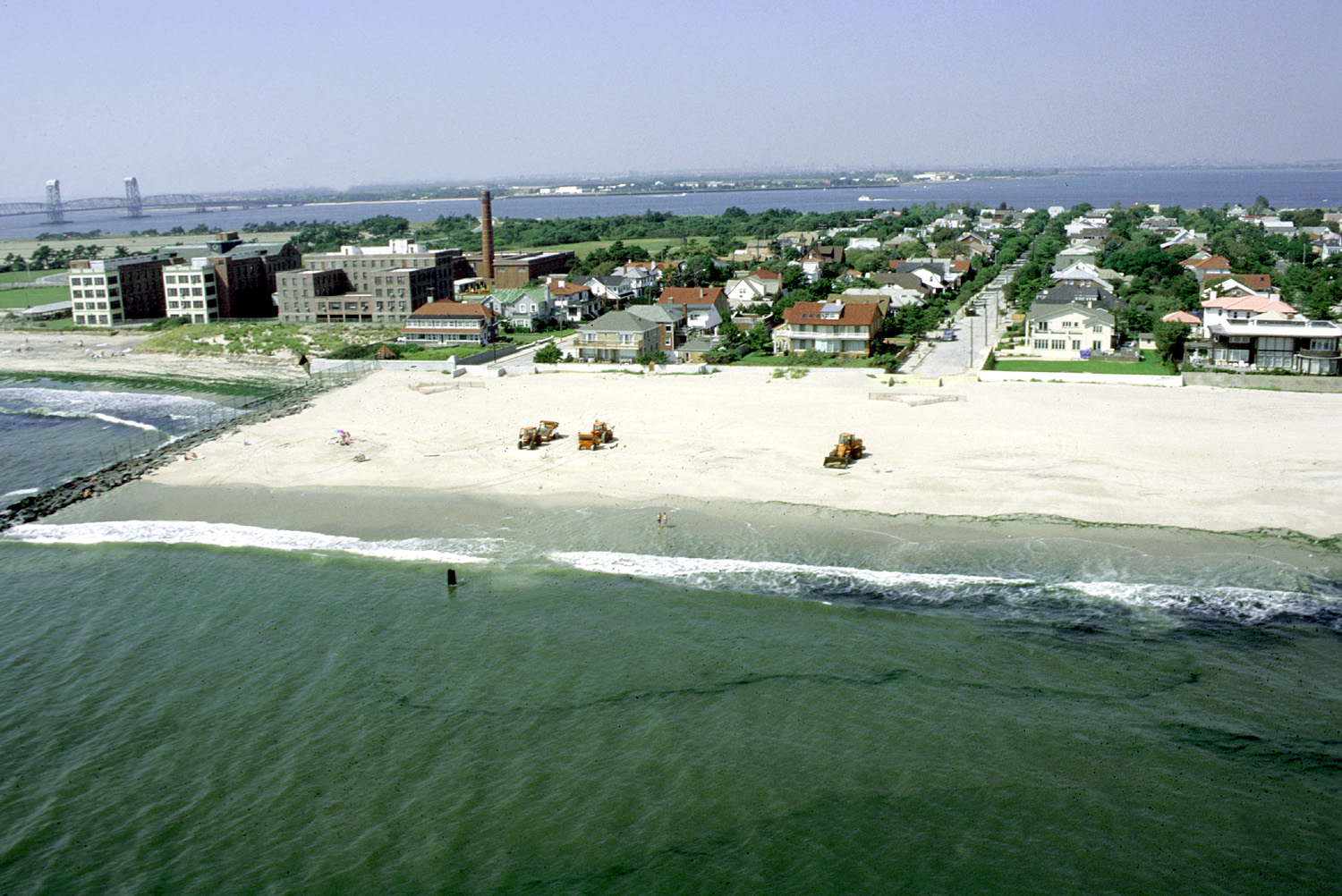
The three buildings of the hospital (far left) adjacent to the Neponsit community

Neponsit Beach Hospital was located on the south side of Rockaway Beach Boulevard just west of 149th Street (originally Mohawk Street), with Rockaway Beach at its southern edge. The hospital sat at the southeast corner of the Jacob Riis Park property, adjacent to the residential portion of Neponsit. It occupied a 5.6-acre (2.3 ha) site. The grounds were originally 14.3 acres (5.8 ha) in size, extending west to the end of the roundabout in front of the park, and included the beaches on the coast of Neponsit Bays 1 and 2.

The hospital consisted of three buildings, two of which fronted the beach. The original building, built in 1915, was designed by the McKim, Mead & White firm. It was four stories high with a red-brick outer facade. It was designed in a "U" shape, with eastern and western wings opening towards the beach. Open-aired balconies and enclosed porches were located on the building facing the beach. It was built with a 122-patient capacity. Renovations were made to the building in 1938 and 1958. Adjacent to the original building was the nurses' residence completed in 1941. It was the easternmost of the two buildings and was also four stories high. It was designed by Dodge & Morrison architects, and built as a Works Progress Administration (WPA) project. Fronting Rockaway Beach Boulevard was the hospital's power plant, built at the same time as the nurses' home. The building also contained the hospital's laundry facilities, a men's dormitory, and an administrative center. A fourth building, a parking garage later converted into an office, was demolished before the rest of the hospital. The hospital's location on the sea provided patients with exposure to sunlight and beach recreation.

The hospital originally contained two sets of murals, commissioned by the Works Progress Administration in 1938. The first set of murals called "The Circus" were painted by Louis Schanker and located on the four walls of the dining room. They consisted of eleven panels depicting clowns and other circus characters. The second series of murals, called "Children at Work and Play", were created by Helen West Heller. The 23 panels portrayed children taking part in games and activities, and include disabled children. Both artists utilized tempera painting. By 2014, NYC Health + Hospitals spent $266,000 a year on the maintenance and security of the property.

The beach directly in front of the hospital (Neponsit Bay 1), now part of Riis Park, is popular among the gay community as well as nudists. A fence, which had originally been erected to separate the hospital from the park, later isolated this section from the rest of the beach until it was taken down by Hurricane Irene in 2011. A second fence just west of Beach 149th Street separates Bay 1 from the Neponsit portion of Rockaway Beach.

=== Transportation ===
The Q22 and Q35 local buses directly serve the hospital's former site on Rockaway Beach Boulevard. The Q22 runs east-to-west across the Rockaway Peninsula, and the Q35 travels between Rockaway Park and Brooklyn. The QM16 express route to Manhattan also operates on Rockaway Beach Boulevard. The closest New York City Subway station is the Rockaway Park–Beach 116th Street station on the IND Rockaway Line north of the hospital's former site, connected by the Q22 and Q35.

== History ==
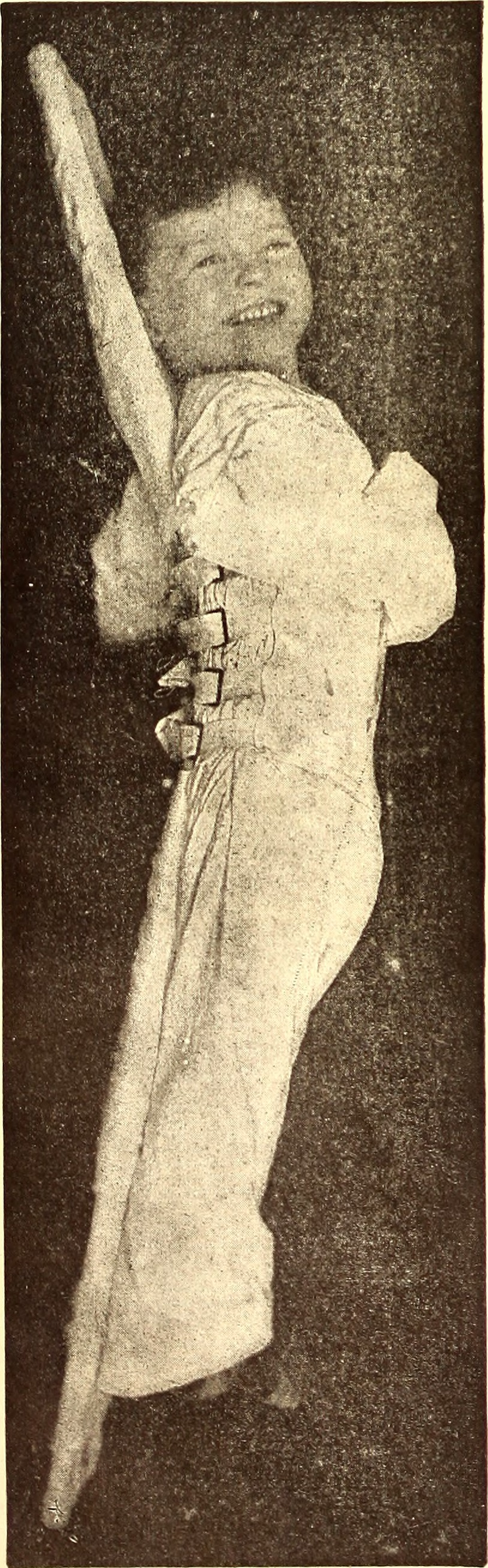
"Smiling Joe", a boy with spinal tuberculosis used as part of the campaign to raise money for the hospital

=== Development ===
Around the turn of the 20th century, social journalist Jacob Riis (the namesake for the future Jacob Riis Park) advocated for a children's hospital to be built in the Rockaways, in order treat the increasing cases of tuberculosis in the city. In 1904, the city planned to build an oceanside park in the western Rockaways, supported by Riis' Association for Improving the Condition of the Poor. The Association as well as New York City Mayor George B. McClellan Jr. also lobbied for a hospital and "convalescent home" to be established. On May 15, 1906, an act was passed in the New York State Legislature allowing for the purchase of beach property in or outside of the city for a maximum of $2.5 million. The act also allowed a portion of the property to be leased for the creation of hospitals. On March 15, 1907, the New York City Board of Estimate accepted $250,000 from the Association to construct a hospital for people with "non-pulmonary tuberculosis". Efforts to develop the park (then called Seaside Park) and the hospital were suspended on November 1, 1907, due to the panic of 1907, but resurrected in 1909. The agreement between the Association and the Board of Estimate was renewed in 1912. The land for what would become Riis Park, 250 acres (100 ha) extending 1 mile (1.6 km) east-to-west, was sold to the city in 1913 by the Neponsit Realty Company, which was developing the Neponsit neighborhood. The site for the hospital was then transferred from the New York City Parks Department on April 24, 1913.

The hospital was funded by private sources and built by the Association, before being turned over to the city. The money had been raised by the Association by 1906 and held in a trust. As part of their campaign, the Association distributed pictures of a boy suffering spinal tuberculosis at Sea Breeze Hospital in Coney Island, Brooklyn, who was strapped to a board as part of his treatment. This boy was later called "Smiling Joe". The pictures were included in letters sent out by the Association, as well as in newspapers and magazines across the country. "Smiling Joe" also received visits from then-President Theodore Roosevelt and John D. Rockefeller. Rockefeller would pledge $125,000 to the project. Construction on the hospital began on January 28, 1914. It was provisionally known as Seaside Hospital. The hospital, which cost $250,000 to construct, was completed by March 1, 1915, and relinquished to the city the next day.

=== Early history ===
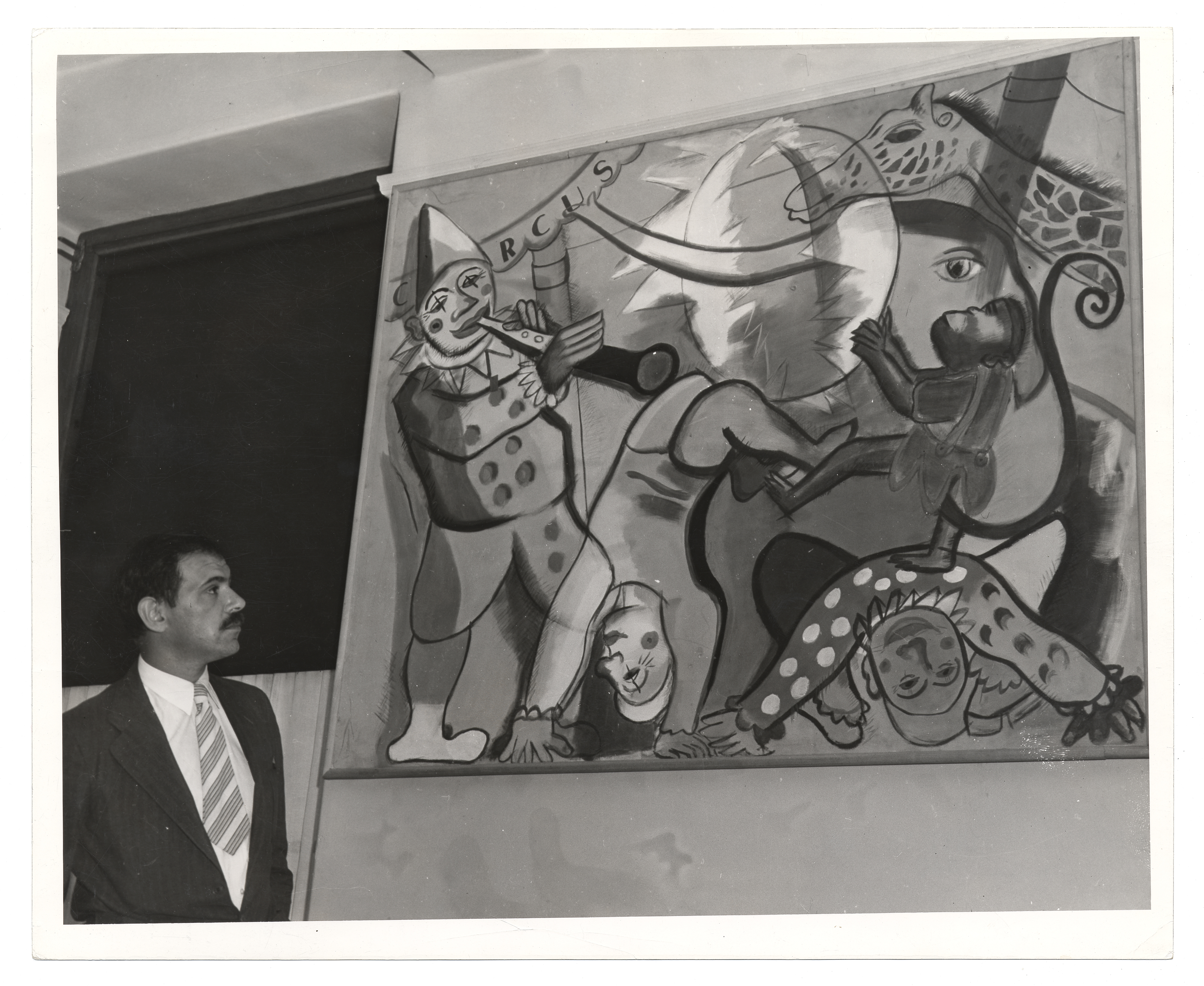
Artist Louis Schanker with one of his murals within Neponsit Hospital in 1939

Neponsit Beach Hospital for Children opened on April 16, 1915. Neponsit Hospital was operated by the Bellevue and Allied Hospitals organization, a city agency which also operated Bellevue Hospital in Manhattan. It replaced Sea Breeze Hospital, also operated by the Association, with children from Sea Breeze transferred to Neponsit. Upon opening, the hospital was subject to odors and fumes from waste disposal operations on nearby Barren Island (now Floyd Bennett Field).

In the 1930s and early 1940s, the hospital was expanded as a Works Progress Administration (WPA) project, adding the nurses' residence and power plant. The expansion was first announced in November 1929 by city hospitals commissioner Dr. William Schroeder, Jr. The project was intended to double the patient capacity of the facility. In June 1931, an appropriation of $300,000 was made by the Board of Estimate for the nurses' home. In December 1933, the city applied for a loan to fund the project. Sketches for the murals were approved as part of the Federal Art Project in October 1935. The first contract was awarded in December 1935, for the power plant. The contract for the nurses' residence was awarded in 1938. In addition, the WPA planned to plant 800 trees and create gardens on the grounds of the hospital, and add a 10-foot (3.0 m) high, 1,000-foot (300 m) sea wall. The power plant was completed in 1939, and work on the nurses' residence began shortly afterwards. The nurses' residence was completed in February 1941.

The hospital was closed temporarily on January 7, 1943, to conserve fuel during World War II. Also during the war, the fence separating Riis Park from the hospital grounds was erected. The hospital was reopened on March 1, 1945, after the United States Public Health Service began leasing it to treat servicemen with tuberculosis. Following the war, the Public Health Service continued to use the hospital for veterans of the war. After short extensions of the lease, it was returned to the city in 1950.

=== Closure of hospital and conversion into nursing home ===
Neponsit Beach Hospital returned to city operations in summer 1950 following minor renovations, and was now associated with Queens General Hospital in Jamaica. In July 1950 Neponsit Beach Hospital began operating as an annex of Triboro Hospital for Tuberculosis (adjacent to Queens General), with 24 patients transferred from Triboro to Neponsit. On June 19, 1952, Queens Hospital Center was formed with the merger of the adjacent Queens General and Triboro Hospitals. Neponsit Beach Hospital, the College Point Outpatient Department, and the Ozone Park ambulance station were also absorbed into the new medical center. Around this time, the city planned to renovate and expand Neponsit Hospital so it could be used in a general hospital capacity in the event of an emergency. Plans were drawn up by the York and Sawyer firm in 1952. In July 1953, the Board of Estimate approved fireproofing and electrical work for the hospital, including fire stairs to replace the original wooden staircases.

However, in January 1955 the city decided to close Neponsit Beach Hospital due to a declining need for tuberculosis treatment. The hospital was vacated on February 1, 1955, with patients transferred to Sea View Hospital or Triboro Hospital. It was officially closed on April 21, 1955. The planned $1 million addition to the complex was cancelled; the plans were approved in 1956 solely in order for the York and Sawyer firm to be compensated.

Following the closure of the hospital, the site was considered a "hot property", located on the beach in the fairly exclusive Neponsit neighborhood. The site of the hospital was valued at $1 million. Numerous groups had conflicting interests in the future of the site. New York City Parks Commissioner Robert Moses desired to use the hospital land to expand the adjacent Jacob Riis Park. Moses planned to raze the hospital buildings in order to construct sports fields, a swimming pool, and a comfort station, and to extend the beach. Moses also pointed out the clause in the 1906 act which provided the land for the hospital, in which it must be returned to the Parks Department when no long used for a hospital. The U.S. Welfare Department proposed that the hospital be converted into a nursing home. Local businessmen such as the Rockaway Park Businessmen's Association, supported by the Rockaways' Chamber of Commerce, desired to build homes on the property. New York City Comptroller Lawrence E. Gerosa desired for the property to be turned over to a private owner, in order to get it "back on the tax rolls". Gerosa may have been influenced by the Rockaway developers, an assertion put forth by Moses. Local residents, meanwhile, wanted the facility reopened as a general hospital, as an annex or relocation of Rockaway Beach Hospital, or converted into a school. These residents were opposed to the Riis Park plans, in part out of fear that extending the park would lead Riis Park visitors to "invade" the adjacent beaches in Neponsit.

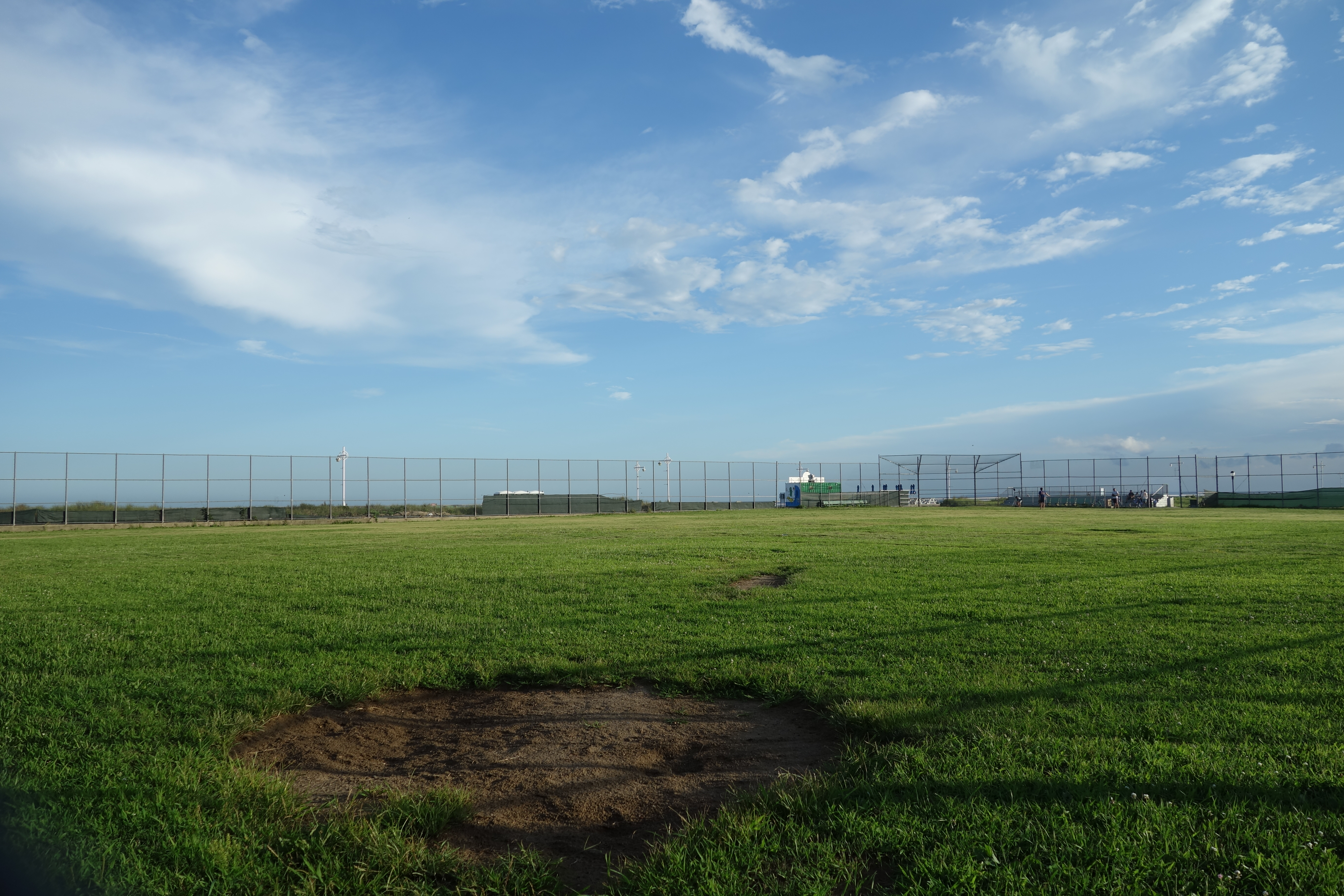
Two baseball diamonds (pictured) were built on the former Neponsit Beach Hospital land ceded back to Riis Park in 1959.

On June 29, 1955, the New York City Planning Commission unanimously approved Moses' plans to extend Riis Park. On July 21, 1955, however, the Board of Estimate voted 10–6 to block Moses' park plans. Those opposed included the five borough presidents, as well as Gerosa who cast multiple votes. The two members in favor of park expansion were Mayor Robert F. Wagner Jr. and city councilman Abe Stark, who each cast three votes. This led to a back-and-forth exchange of letters between Moses and Gerosa. After a lawsuit by the Park Association of New York City, on October 14, 1955, New York Attorney General Jacob K. Javits stated in an advisory ruling that the city did not have the jurisdiction to sell the hospital as it was still parkland. The ruling had been requested by Moses. On October 27, New York Supreme Court Justice Peter M. Daly ruled in favor of the Park Association, preventing the sale. The ruling was upheld by the Appellate Court in Brooklyn on July 9, 1956.

On October 15, 1958, a compromise plan was proposed by councilman Stark and Mayor Wagner. The plan entailed the conversion of the hospital into the nursing home proposed by the Welfare Department. The surrounding undeveloped land would be absorbed into Jacob Riis Park. The plan was approved by New York City Board of Estimate in February 1959. Renovations were made to the main building and the nurses' residence. The Neponsit Home for the Aged was dedicated and opened August 31, 1961. Among those in attendance was city councilman Stark, who urged the construction of more facilities like the Neponsit Home, due to the increasing elderly population in the city. This included the conversion of the former Manhattan Beach Hospital (now the site of Kingsborough Community College) in Brooklyn into a nursing home. Costing $2.4 million, the Neponsit Home was the first municipally-operated geriatric facility in the city. Meanwhile, 10 acres (4.0 ha) of the property were turned over to the Parks Department to expand Riis Park, adding 1,000 feet (300 m) of beach.

=== Later use and final closure ===
In July 1985 under Mayor Ed Koch, the New York City Health and Hospitals Corporation (HHC), which operates city-owned health facilities, planned to transfer 10 patients diagnosed with HIV/AIDS from Bellevue Hospital to an isolated wing of the Neponsit Home. The plan received opposition from the local community, due to fears about the transmission of the disease at the time. On July 31, a Queens judge blocked the move. Koch proceeded to drop the plans on September 3.

Between September 10 and 12, 1998, the nursing home was evacuated and closed after bricks fell from the roof of the building due to damage from the Labor Day storm of that year. Residents of the home were forced to leave the facility in the middle of the night. Patients were transferred to Bellevue Hospital in Lower Manhattan, and the Coler and Goldwater Hospitals on Roosevelt Island. City officials under Mayor Rudy Giuliani stated that the buildings were in danger of collapsing, and that renovations were required to make the facility structurally sound. An estimate made by an engineering firm on June 19, 1998, stated it would take $1 million to renovate the facility; following the closure, that figure rose to $50 million. After closing the home, the city initially planned to sell the site, to "get it back on the tax rolls" according to deputy mayor Joe Lhota. The site was worth an estimated $15 to $20 million. By late October, however, Lhota stated that the sale of the site was blocked by the deed restrictions on the property, based on the 1955 court ruling which prevented the sale of the hospital at that time. Meanwhile, accusations were made against Giuliani of using new tactics to justify closing health facilities, after attempts to privatize Coney Island Hospital, Elmhurst Hospital Center, and Queens Hospital Center. There were also rumors of a plan to develop a hotel on the site. After the plans to sell the site fell through, Giuliani and the city decided to demolish the hospital and develop a waterfront park on the site. The plan was announced October 28, 1998 by Giuliani and the HHC. It was opposed by the local community. On October 30, 1998, District Court Judge Deborah Batts blocked the demolition of the buildings.

On November 2, 1998, the federal government released a report on the relocation, finding that the Health and Hospitals Corporation endangered the lives of the 300 residents, and deceived them about plans to later return to the Neponsit Home. It also found that the hasty evacuation was unnecessary. Based on the report, the Health Care Financing Administration fined the HHC $3,050 per day for every day the former residents remained in sub-par housing, totaling $450,000. In December 1998, a portion of the complex, the Neponsit Adult Day Health Care which provided outpatient physical therapy, was relocated to the gymnasium of the Young Israel of Far Rockaway synagogue in Far Rockaway. A second court ruling on October 29, 1999, stated that the HHC overextended its authority when evacuating the facility, and blocked demolition. Despite this, the Giuliani administration continued to try and demolish the building. In March 2000, a structural evaluation was conducted by the New York City Council, finding the three Neponsit buildings to be in good condition, with repairs estimated at $600,000.

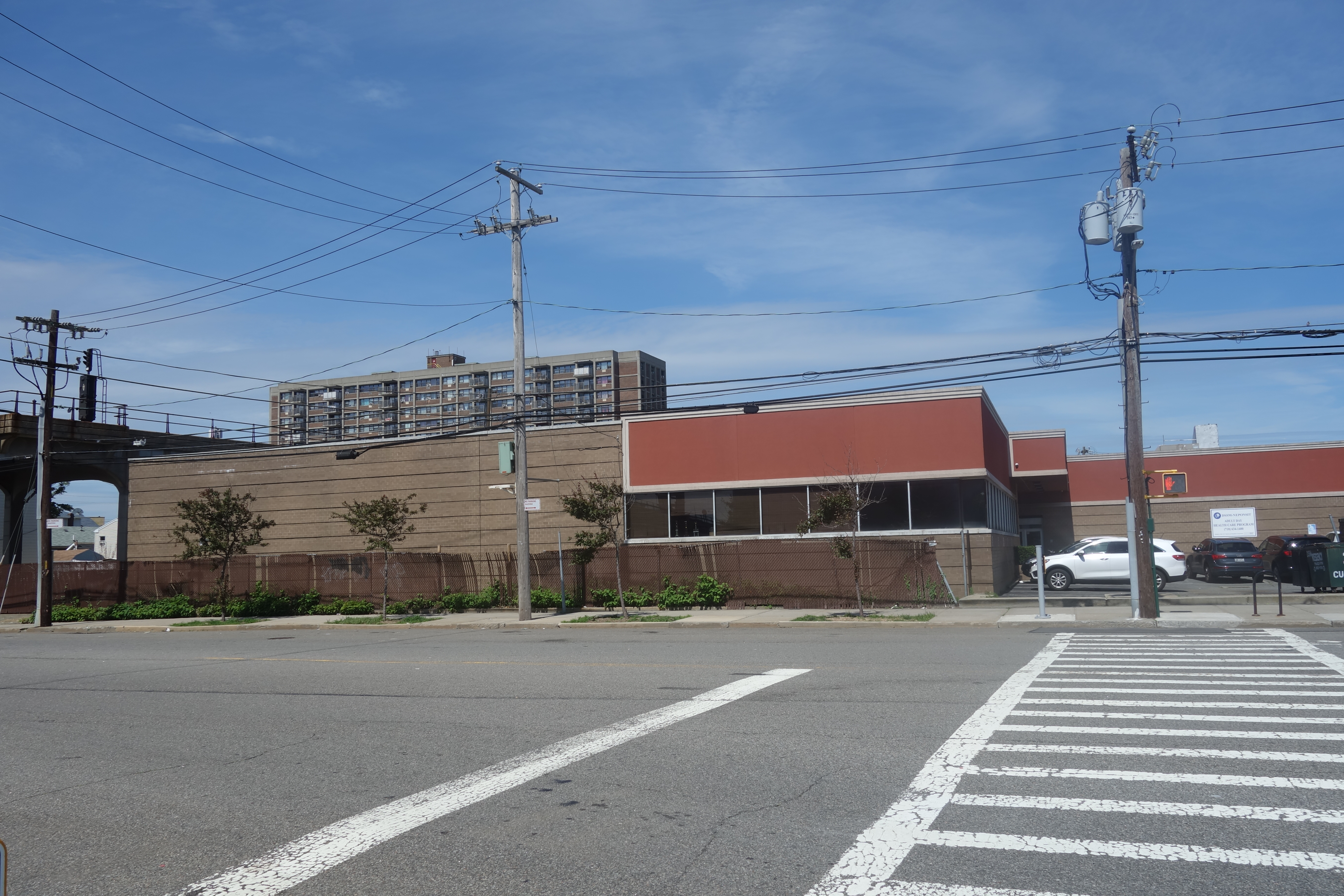
Neponsit Adult Day Health Care, formerly located in the nursing home, was moved to the Sands Point Professional Building (pictured) in 2004.

Following a lawsuit over the closure of the facility by former residents and the Legal Aid Society, on June 2, 2003, under the administration of Michael Bloomberg, the HHC agreed to pay $5 million out of court, with $18,000 going to each patient or their estate if they had died. In addition, the city must give notice in the future if it intends to transfer 100 or more nursing home patients.

Redevelopment or use of the site, meanwhile, was limited due to its deed restrictions. On March 9, 2004, the Neponsit Adult Day Health Care moved to a permanent location in the Sands Point Professional Building at Beach 102nd Street in nearby Rockaway Park. In 2006, the HHC considered plans to turn over facility to the city, and develop luxury homes on the site. These plans were opposed by local residents and politicians. Alternate plans from the community called for a veteran's rehabilitation center, or a children's hospital. Local politician Lew Simon, in opposition to the city plans, stated it would take "seven years" to rezone the land for other purposes. None of these plans came to fruition. In 2008, the HHC spent $1 million in order to cleanup debris on the property, and repair fences and windows. At this time, the site was appraised at $40 million.

=== Demolition ===
In April 2022, the New York City government announced plans to demolish the remains of the Neponsit Beach Hospital. These plans prompted opposition from LGBTQ community. As of September 2022, city officials had not finalized plans for the site, although they tentatively planned to convert the hospital site into a parking lot and a lifeguard station. In its abandonment, the former Neponsit Hospital buildings had become the site of LGBT-affirming public art with messages such as "Black Trans Lives Matter", "Queer Trans Power", and a pride flag foregrounded by watchful eyes, much of the art done by Hugo Gyrl. When plans for the demolition were announced, a school of fish was found living in the Neponsit Hospital site's flooded basement. After advocacy efforts by LGBTQ activists and fish rescuers, the fish were rehomed prior to demolition. The hospital building was demolished in early 2023.
