= Queens Hospital Center =

Hospital in Queens New York, United States

- NYC Health + Hospitals
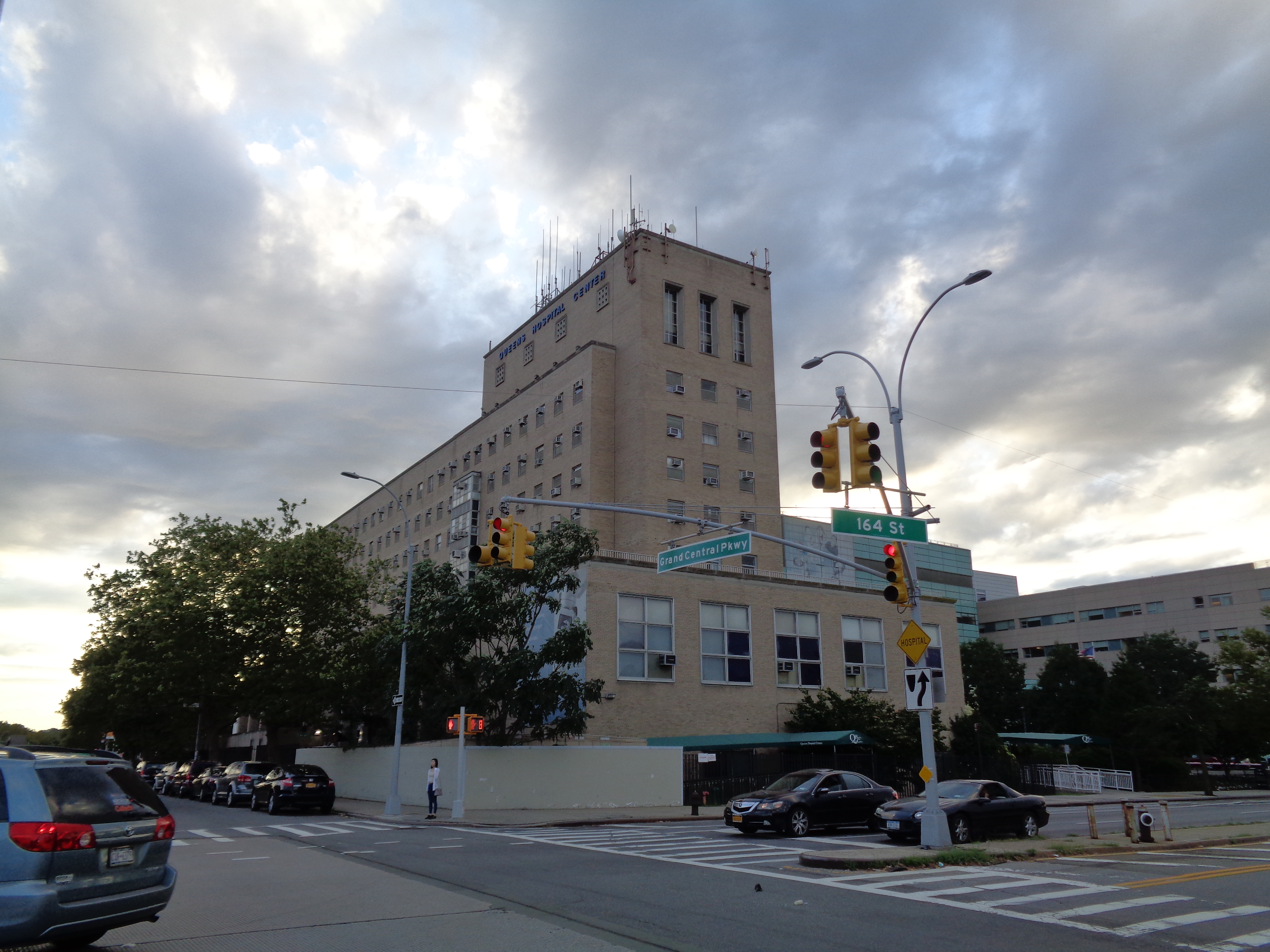

Geography
- Location: 82-68 164th Street, Jamaica 11432, New York City, New York, United States
- Coordinates: 40.716995°N 73.804381°W

Organization
- Affiliated university: Icahn School of Medicine at Mount Sinai

History
- Opened: 1935

Links
- Website: nychealthandhospitals.org/queens
- Lists: Hospitals in New York State
- Other links: Hospitals in Queens

Queens Hospital Center (QHC), also known as NYC Health + Hospitals/Queens and originally called Queens General Hospital, is a large public hospital campus in the Jamaica Hills and Hillcrest neighborhoods of Queens in New York City. It is operated by NYC Health + Hospitals, a public benefit corporation of the city.

Queens General Hospital opened in 1935 as the first municipal general hospital in the borough. It would absorb the adjacent Queensboro Hospital for Communicable Diseases shortly after opening, and the campus would later include Triboro Hospital for Tuberculosis, which opened in 1941. Queens Hospital Center was formed in 1952 and 1959 with the official merger of the three hospitals along with two other Queens medical facilities. The current campus consists of modern buildings constructed in the 21st century, along with the former Triboro Hospital building.

== Campus ==
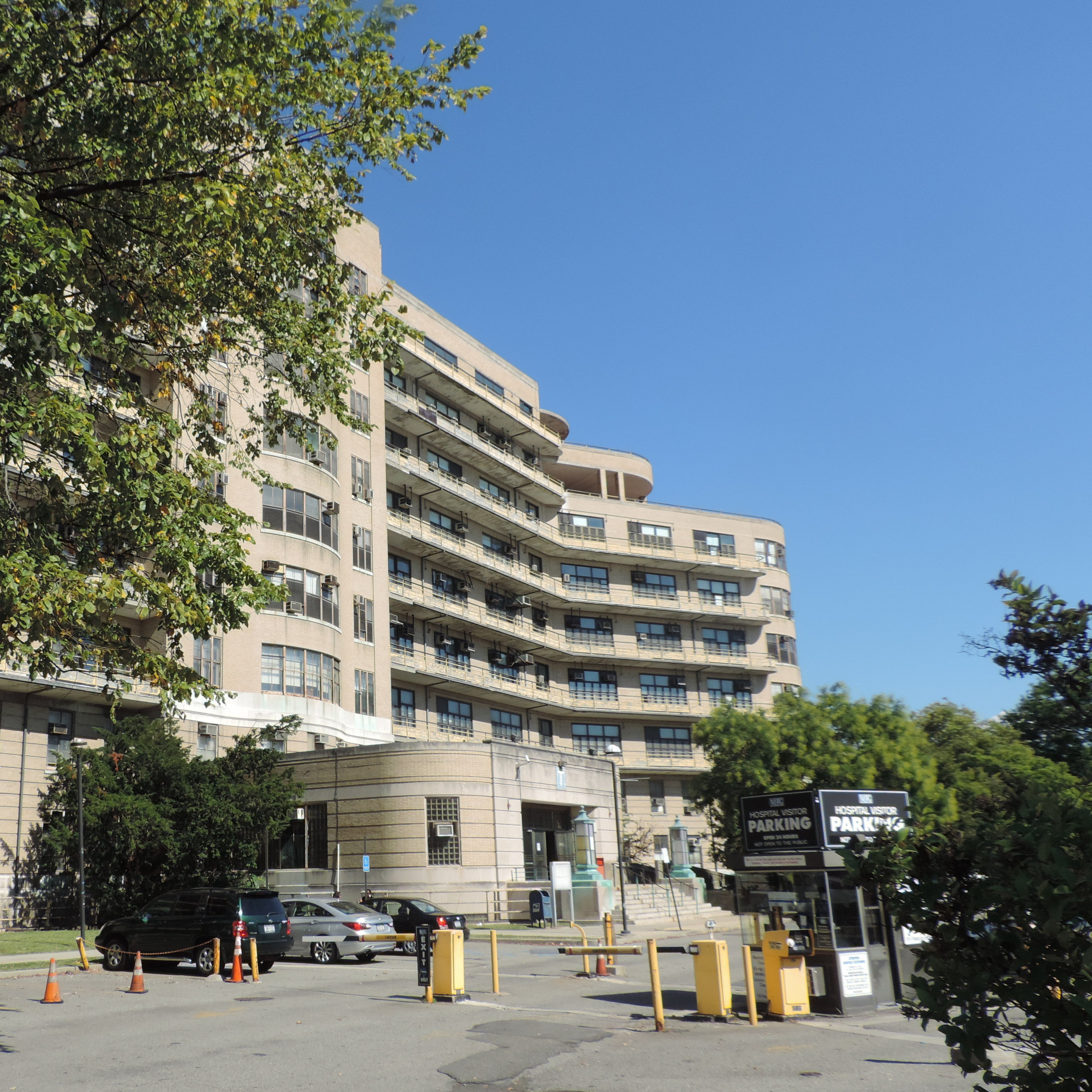
Building T, the former Triboro Hospital, at Parsons Boulevard and 82nd Drive.

Queens Hospital Center is located on a 22-acre (8.9 ha) campus in the Hillcrest neighborhood of Queens. The large property is bound by Parsons Boulevard to the west and 164th Street to the east, with Goethals Avenue to the north. At the south end of the site is the Grand Central Parkway, though most of the campus ends one block north at 82nd Drive.

The main building, opened in 2001, is located at the southwest corner of 164th Street and 82nd Road just north of the Grand Central Parkway. The building was designed by the Perkins and Will and Davis Brody Bond architectural firms, with a largely-glass outer facade. It has 360,000 square feet (33,000 m^{2}) of space and 200 beds. It features private and semi-private patient rooms, in contrast to the large hospital wards of the previous buildings. Adjacent to the south of the main building fronting the Grand Central is the only remaining pre-2000 hospital building. This is the "N Building", the former Queens Hospital Center School of Nursing built in 1956. It is connected to the main building by an atrium structure. The nursing school graduated its final class in June 1977.

Across to the north from the main building is the Claire Shulman Pavilion (originally The Pavilion), opened in 2007. It is an outpatient ambulatory care facility. It was designed by the Perkins Eastman firm, and constructed by Dormitory Authority of the State of New York. It is six-stories high extending 300 feet (91 m) across from east-to-west, and has 142,000 square feet (13,200 m^{2}) of space. The outer facade consists of precast concrete, with glass curtain walls on the east (front) and south faces. The building has a structural steel frame with a cantilever spine. The interior utilizes modular walls to allow for quick expansion of clinics. The entrance to the building at 164th Street has a two-story atrium and entrance plaza. A public concourse runs along the south side of the building. Two bridges connect with the main QHC building, each measuring 100 feet (30 m) in length. Services provided at the Shulman Pavilion include a diabetes treatment center, primary care, child development and early childhood intervention, pediatrics, psychiatry, ophthalmology, and dentistry.

At the west end of the campus on Parsons Boulevard between 82nd Drive and Goethals Avenue is "Building T" or the "T Building". It was originally the Triboro Hospital for Tuberculosis, completed in 1941. The building was designed by architect John Russell Pope, and later by the Eggers & Higgins firm after Pope's death, in Art Moderne-style. Then-New York City Commissioner of Hospitals Dr. Sigismund Goldwater supervised the design. A tunnel in the basement connected to the now demolished Queens General Hospital buildings. The T Building is currently used by QHC for administrative offices, storage, and clinic and psychiatric services. Several clinics were relocated to the Shulman Pavilion when it opened in 2007. More services have been relocated from the T Building since then, due to the deteriorating condition of the building.

In between the Shulman Pavilion and the Triboro Hospital, at the corner of 82nd Drive and 161st Street (160-15 82nd Drive) is an Office of Chief Medical Examiner of the City of New York. It is a morgue, providing autopsy and mortuary services. The building was constructed circa 2007.

At the northeast corner of the campus, at 164th Street and Goethals Avenue, is the power plant for the hospital. The two-story Art Deco brick building was completed in 1932, built along with the original Queens General Hospital, and was considered a modern facility at the time of its construction. One of its most notable features is its large chimney. Adjacent to the west between 160th and 161st Streets is the Queens Gateway to Health Sciences Secondary School, a grades 6–12 public school. Adjacent to the west of the school is FDNY EMS Station 50, opened in July 2016, which oversee FDNY ambulances and contains the Queens East EMS Borough Command Center. The EMS station, designed by Dean-Wolf Architects, has a glass and aluminum outer facade, a steel frame, and a concrete foundation with a cantilever shape due to the topography of the area. It is the largest EMS station in the borough. Another EMS station and medical examiner building, and storage and utility buildings were previously located along Goethals Avenue (see below). At the western end of the block on Parsons Boulevard adjacent to Building T is a storage garage known as the "S Building", built in 1957.

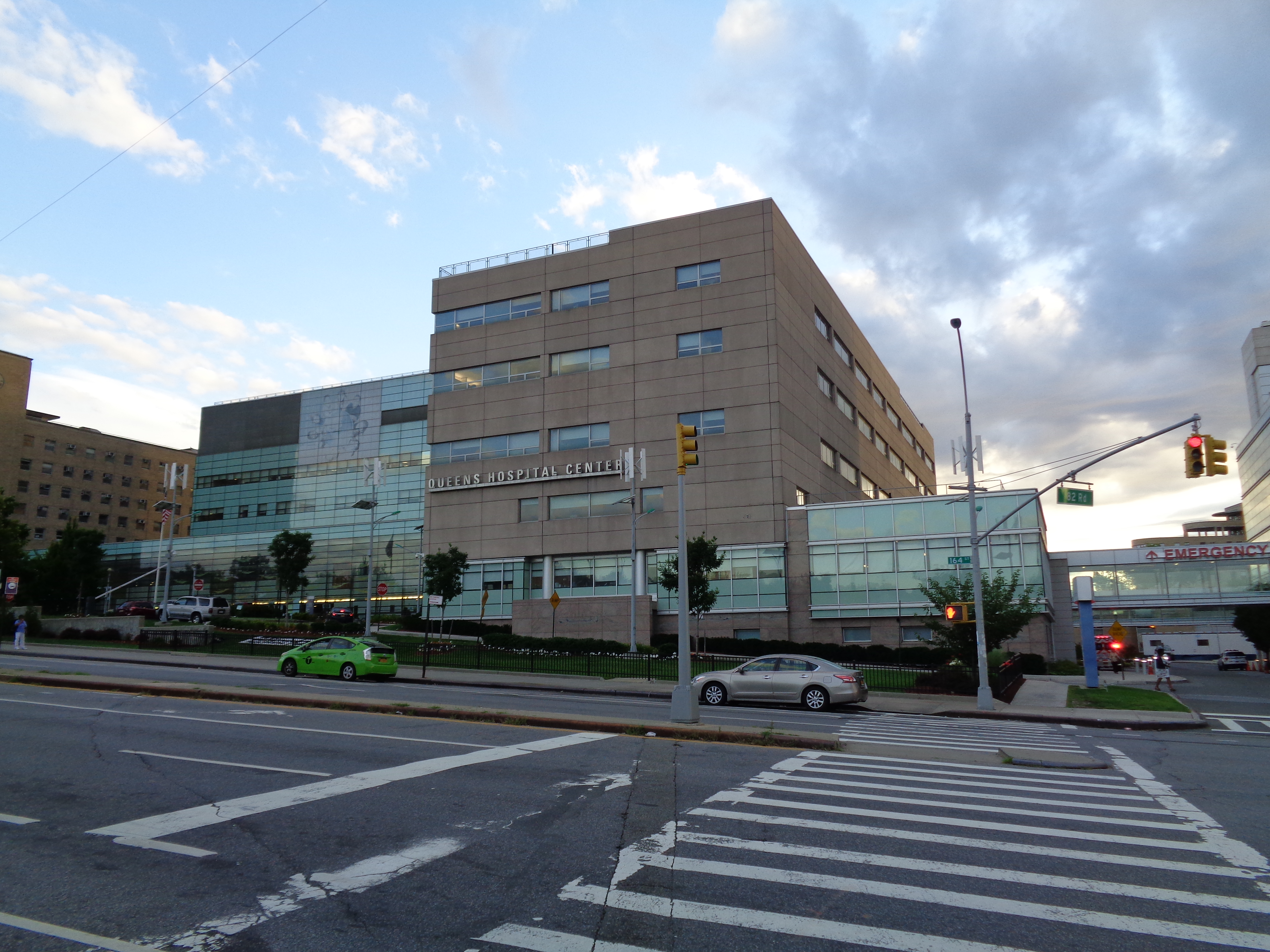
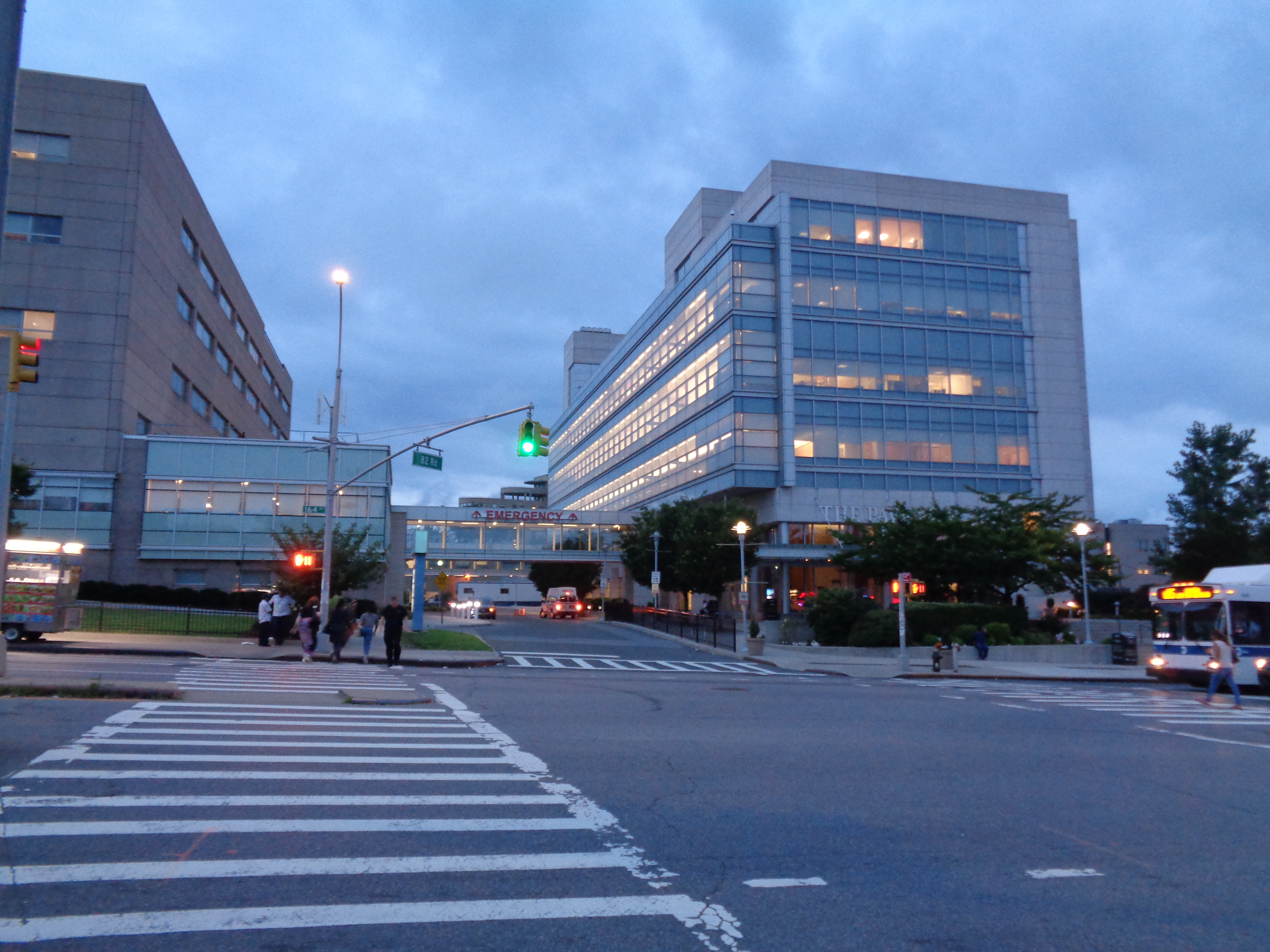
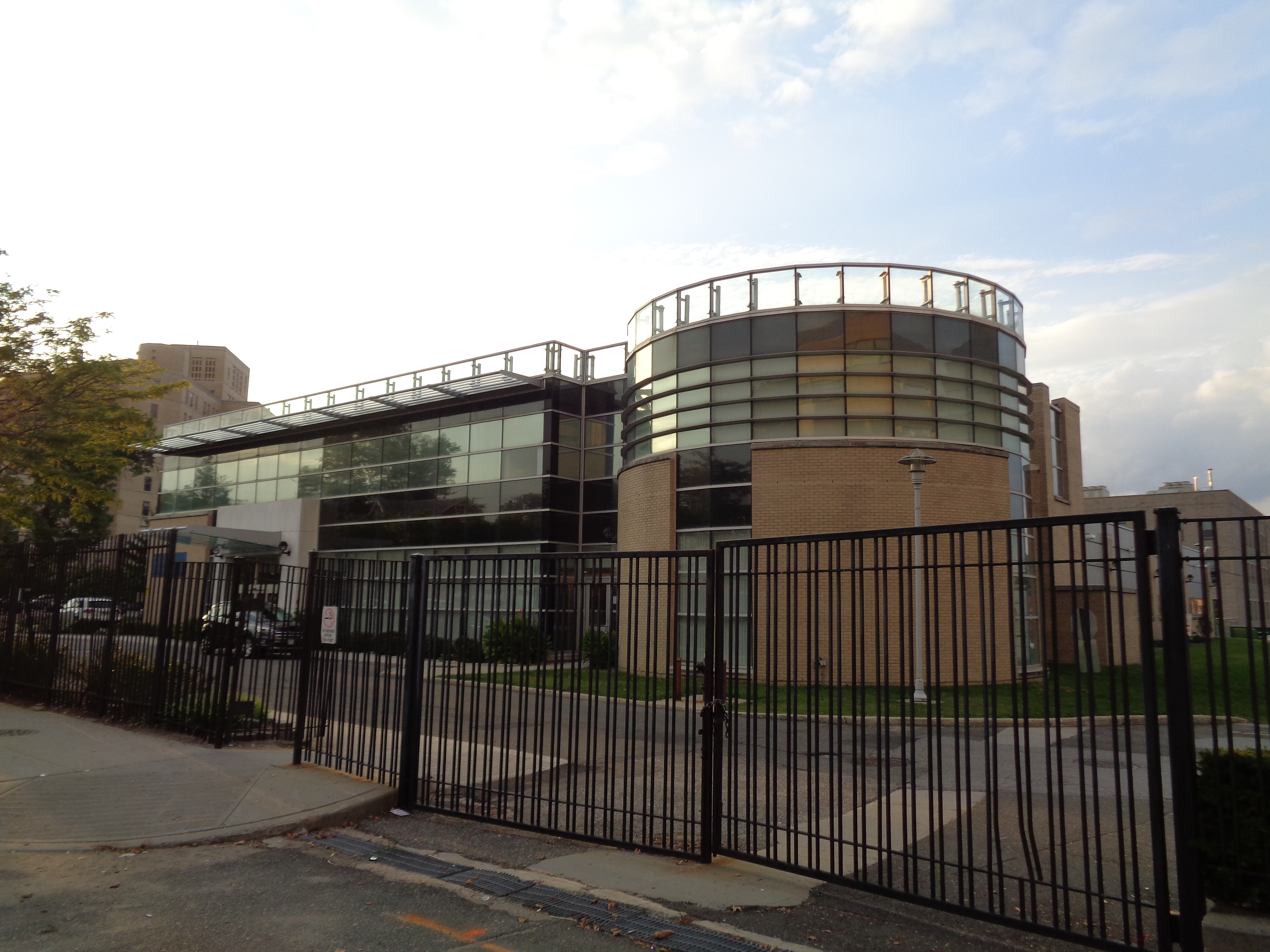
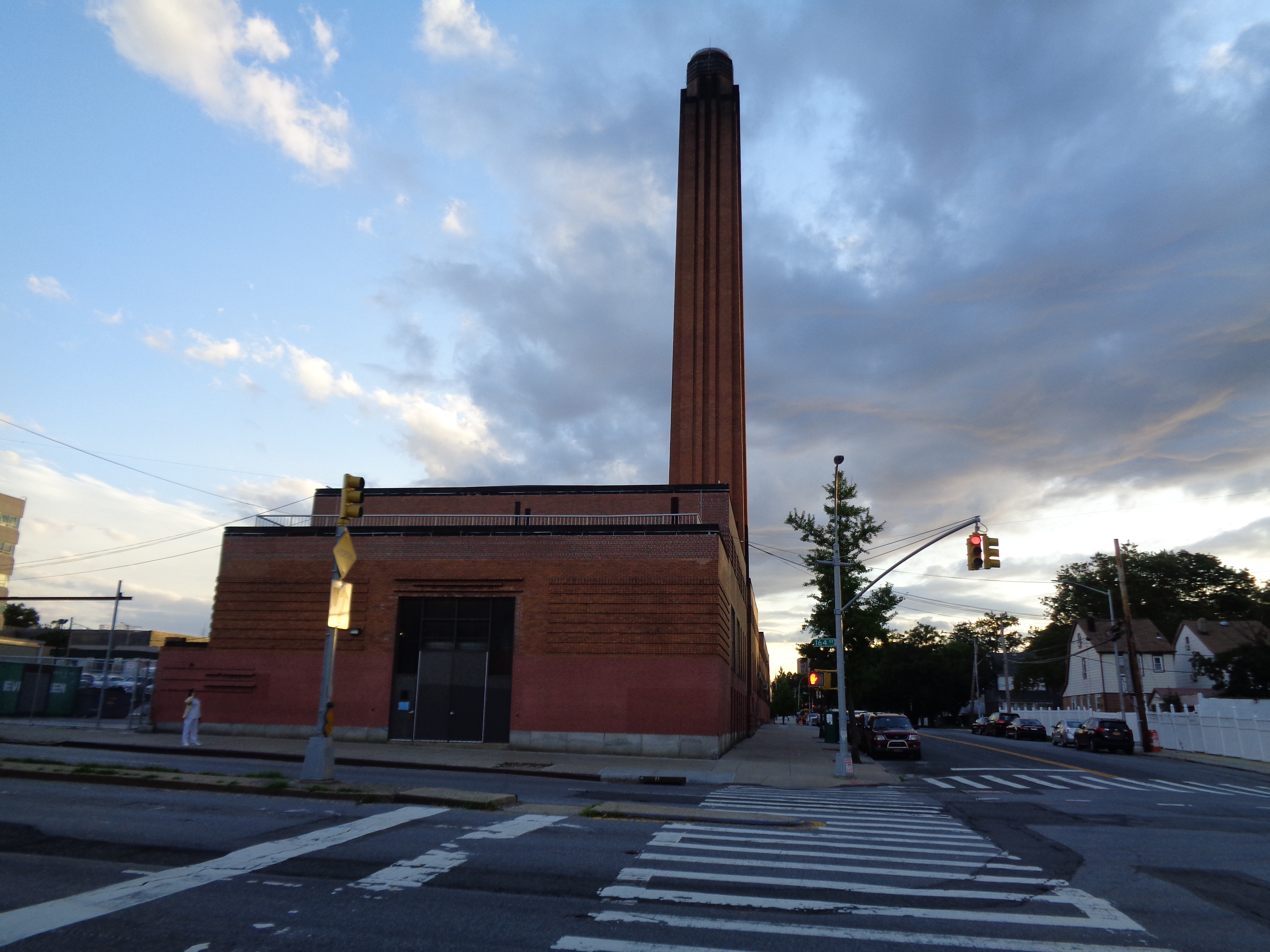
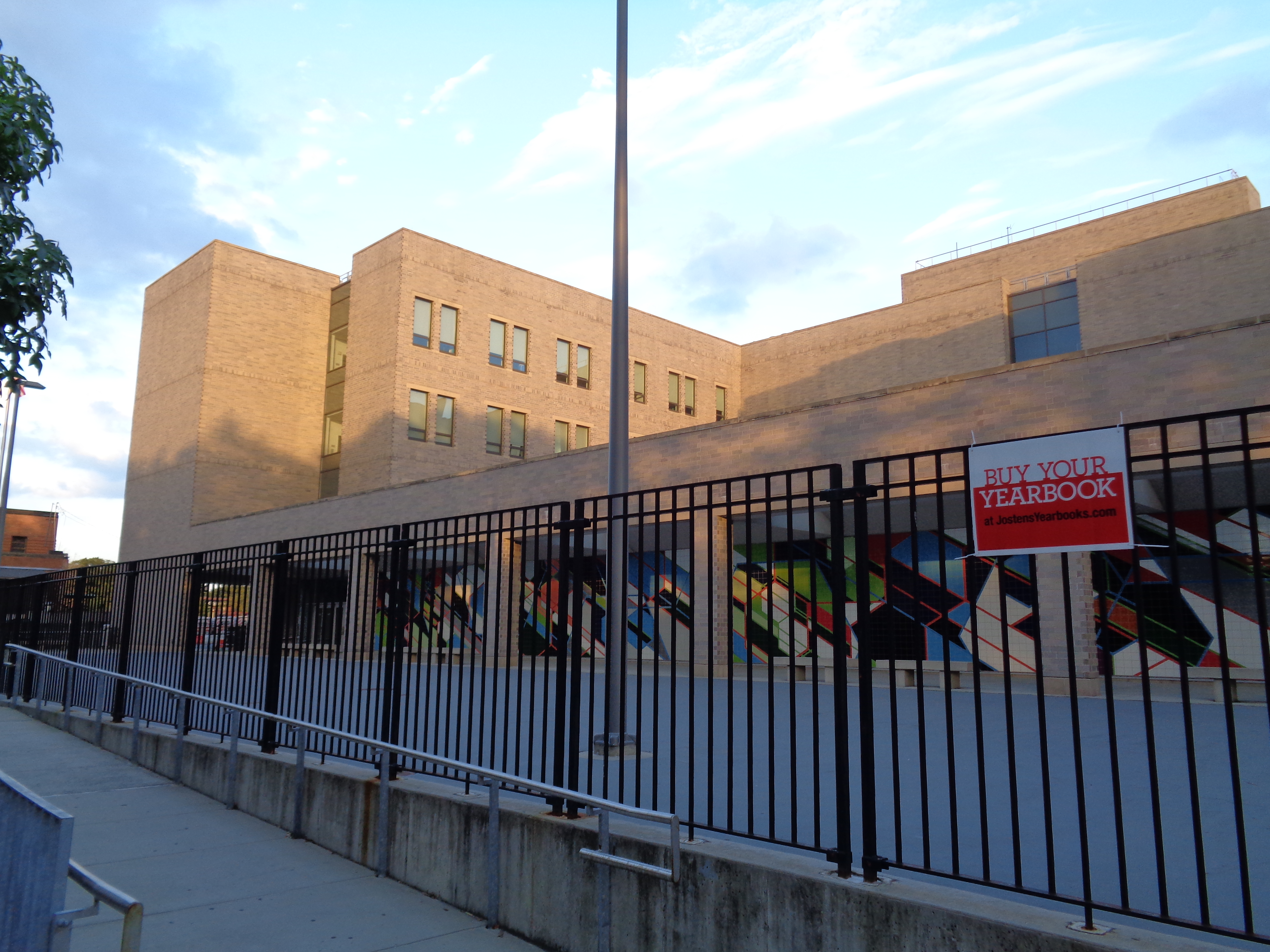
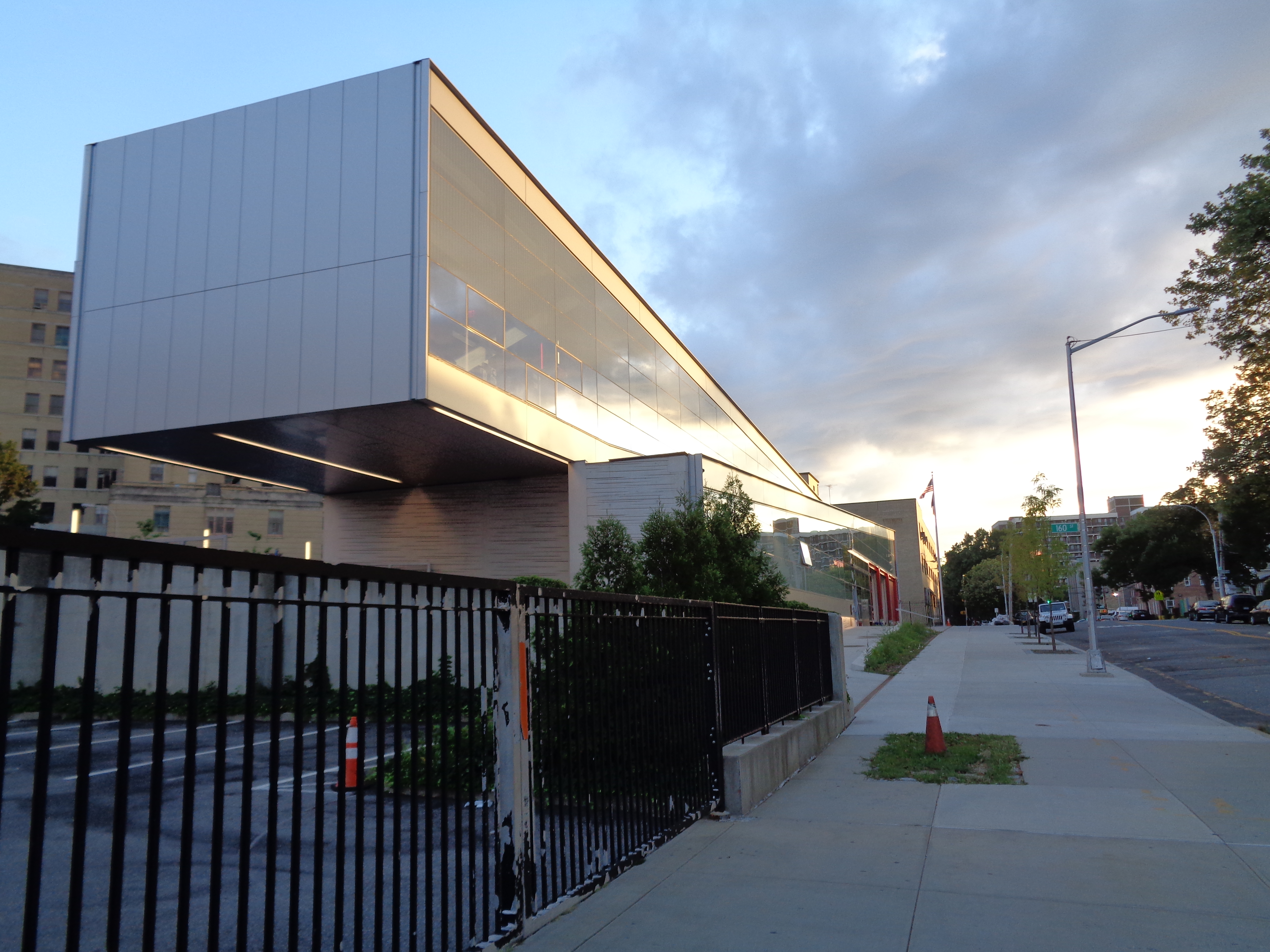
Left to right: The current main QHC building, opened 2001; "The Pavilion", opened 2007; the Queens Morgue; the hospital power plant; Queens Gateway Secondary School; FDNY EMS Station 50

=== Old Queens General Hospital buildings ===
As originally constructed in 1935, the Queens General Hospital consisted of eleven buildings. Prior to the construction of the current campus, the site contained 14 buildings. Most of the buildings in the complex were constructed of brick, and all of the original buildings were connected by tunnels.

The original main Queens General Hospital building fronted 164th Street between 82nd Road and the power plant, on the site of the current Pavilion. It was built in Art Deco-style. It stood nine stories tall, with two additional floors at the center of the structure. The building was set back 150 feet (46 m) from the street. Its outer facade consisted of orange or salmon-colored brick, with sandstone trim. It originally housed 582 beds. There were three wards per floor, for a total of 18 wards. In the sub-basement were a storeroom and sewage utilities. The basement contained kitchens and cafeterias, a record room, a patient library, and a pharmacy. A sunroom was located on the tenth floor. Murals created by Georgette Seabrooke and William C. Palmer were present in the building.

Located on the site of the current main building and nursing school were a nurses home for housing nurses, an employee's home for medical residents and hospital superintendents, and a staff building for administrative offices. Along Goethals Avenue, where the Queens Gateway School and EMS station now sit, were (from east to west) the power plant, a laundry facility, a garage for ambulance storage, an industrial workshop for creating furniture and other items, and the mortuary building. The morgue, which occupied the site of the school on 160th Street, was a small salmon brick building, and served as a municipal morgue for the entire borough. This site was found to be contaminated with petroleum prior to the construction of the school. In between Goethals Avenue and 82nd Drive, along the right-of-way of 160th Street near the current morgue, was the Queensboro Hospital which became Queens General's contagious disease division called the Queensboro Pavilion. It consisted of two buildings. Only the power plant survives from the original 1930s campus.

=== Transportation ===
The Q65 bus route runs north-to-south along 164th Street on the east side of the campus, serving the main buildings. The Q25 bus run along Parsons Boulevard at the west end of the campus, directly serving Building T. The Q45, Q46 and Q48 buses runs along Union Turnpike two blocks north of the hospital grounds, which gets very good usage by this hospitals personnel, and out-patients as well. The closest New York City Subway stations are the Parsons Boulevard station of the IND Queens Boulevard Line on Hillside Avenue to the south, connected by the Q25 and Q65, and the Kew Gardens–Union Turnpike station to the west connected by the Q45, Q46 and Q48. The Q25 and Q65 routes also connect with the Jamaica Center–Parsons/Archer subway station on Parsons and Archer Avenues, and the Sutphin Boulevard–Archer Avenue–JFK Airport subway and Jamaica Long Island Rail Road stations on Supthin Boulevard and Archer Avenue.

== Service area ==
Although it is located approximately between Northeast Queens and Southeast Queens, Queens Hospital Center predominantly serves neighborhoods in Southeast Queens south of Union Turnpike and east of the Van Wyck Expressway. These areas include Jamaica, South Jamaica, Hollis, Queens Village, Springfield Gardens, Cambria Heights, St. Albans, and Rosedale. The hospital also serves areas of Flushing, Oakland Gardens. and Fresh Meadows within the 11364, 11365, 11366, and 11367 zip codes (Kew Gardens Hills and Pomonok), as well as parts of Richmond Hill, Ozone Park, and South Ozone Park which lie west of the Van Wyck. As of 2016, over 40 percent of the service area's population is Black, including African Americans and Afro-Caribbeans. Of the remaining population, 15 percent is Hispanic or Latino, 10 percent identifies as Asian or Pacific Islander, and 4 percent identifies as White. A significant portion of the service area consists of South Asian immigrants from nations such as India, Pakistan, and Bangladesh, as well as Guyanese. Much of the population is foreign-born and low income.

== History ==
The 22-acre site of Queens Hospital Center was originally the Haack farm, purchased by the city in 1903. The first hospital on the site was the Queensboro Hospital for Communicable Diseases, located east of Parsons Boulevard (then Flushing Avenue). It was designed by architects William E. Austin and George W. Conable, and opened on June 29, 1916. A total of 20 buildings were initially planned for the hospital. A second building was completed in 1923. The first morgue in Queens was opened at the hospital in 1930.

=== Construction of Queens General Hospital ===
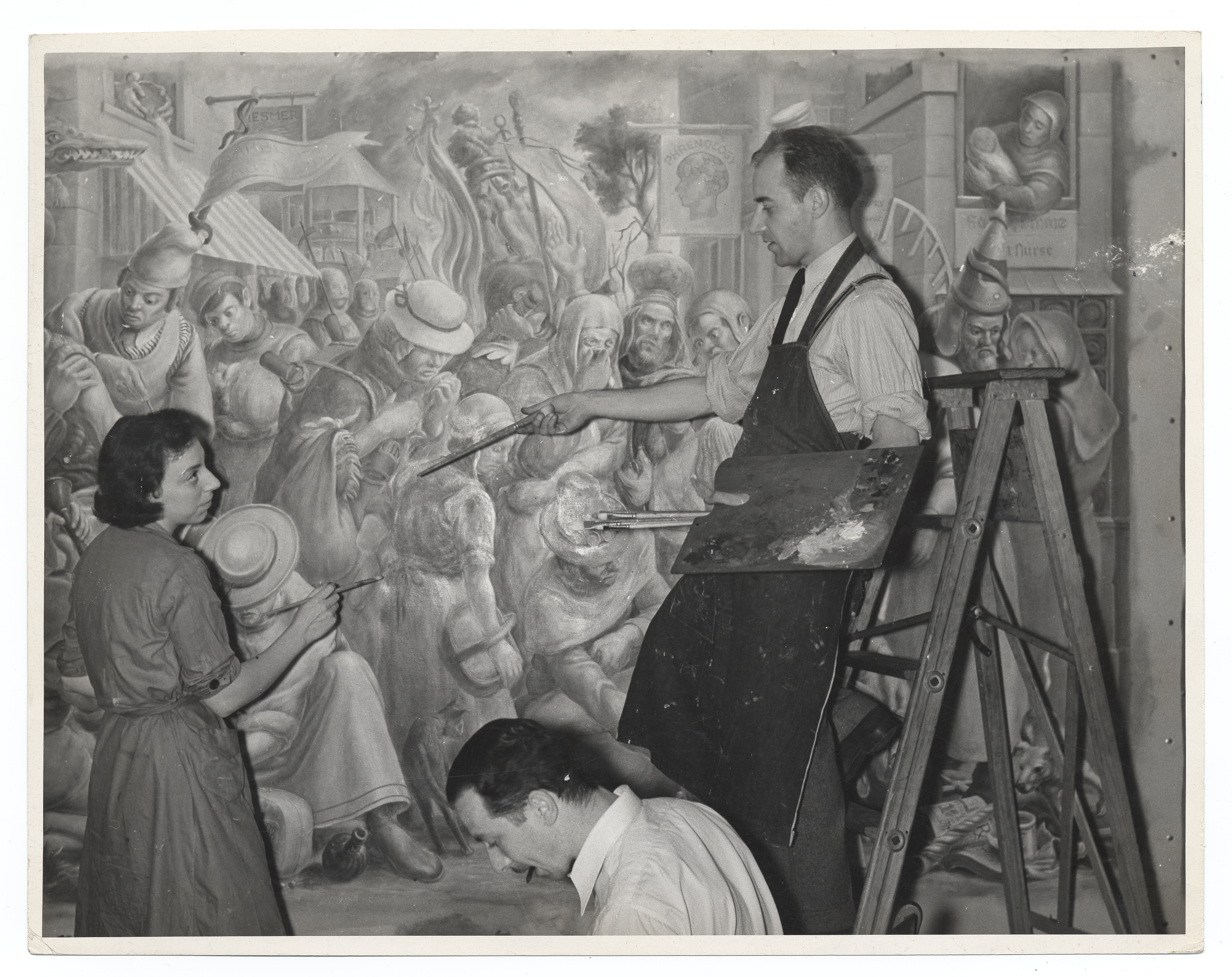
William C. Palmer working on a mural in Queens General Hospital in 1936

In 1928, Queens County Medical Society (or the Medical Society of Queens County) began petitioning the New York City Board of Estimate and Mayor Jimmy Walker for a free public hospital in the borough. At the time, there were no municipal general hospitals in Queens, and people were required to use Kings County Hospital in Brooklyn, or Bellevue Hospital in Lower Manhattan. Queens General Hospital was proposed by the city in 1929, also referred to as the new Queensboro Hospital. The vacant property adjacent to the existing Queensboro Hospital was selected as the site for the new hospital. At the time, only five of the 22 acres on the site were occupied. The contract for general construction was approved by Board of Estimate on October 24, 1930. The cornerstone of the main building was laid by Mayor Walker on June 19, 1931, at 164th Street. The buildings were largely complete by 1932, but remained inactive due to a lack of funds to purchase equipment and furniture, and to complete the surrounding grounds. Meanwhile, a storm drain was installed along 164th Street between Goethals Avenue and 78th Road (just past Union Turnpike) by 1933. The primitive dirt roads surrounding the hospital including 164th Street were improved and paved, with Works Progress Administration funds. Two willow trees, which originally divided farms in the area, were preserved for the hospital, and were the only trees on the hospital grounds upon its opening. On January 5, 1934, the city was awarded a Public Works Administration grant of $800,000, of which $260,000 went to the hospital project. These were the first PWA funds received by city and allowed work on buildings to be completed. The project, however, continued to suffer delays, which led to complaints and protests from local residents. Hospitals commissioner Sigismund Goldwater said that the completion of the hospital was blocked by "red tape". On October 30, 1935, the hospital was dedicated, with Mayor Fiorello H. La Guardia, commissioner Goldwater and Queens Borough President George U. Harvey in attendance.

The new Queens General Hospital campus was referred to as a "miniature city" due to its many buildings, and its self-sustaining facilities such as the power plant, a heating plant, and the laundry building. Among the then-modern medical innovations at the hospital were specialized X-ray equipment, radium for the treatment of cancer (a practice now obsolete), and an iron lung. The first patient was admitted to Queens General Hospital on November 17, 1935. Beds in the new hospital were reserved for patients who could not afford to pay; those who could were forced to use one of the private hospitals in the borough. On March 1, 1936, the Queensboro Hospital was merged into Queens General. At this time, Queensboro Hospital was renamed the Queensboro Pavilion for Communicable Diseases. By July 1936 the hospital was overcrowded, operating at 126.3 percent capacity.

Additional storm drains were installed around hospital and in the surrounding neighborhood in 1939. Around this time the Queensboro Pavilion was renovated. Triboro Hospital for Tuberculosis was dedicated at the west end of the campus on January 28, 1941 by Mayor La Guardia, who stated that it was designed to be converted into a general hospital "twenty-five years from now."

=== Creation of Queens Hospital Center ===
On June 19, 1952, it was announced that Queens General, Queensboro Hospital, and Triboro Hospital would be consolidated into Queens Hospital Center. Three other facilities were also absorbed into the new hospital: Neponsit Beach Hospital, another tuberculosis hospital adjacent to Jacob Riis Park in Neponsit, Rockaway; the College Point Outpatient Department, an outpatient dispensary; and the Ozone Park ambulance station. In spite of the unification, Queens General and Triboro Hospital continued to operate largely independent of each other. The College Point dispensary was closed at the end of August 1954, while Neponsit Beach Hospital was closed on April 21, 1955 due to a declining need for tuberculosis treatment.

On January 25, 1954, QHC opened a child orthopedic rehabilitation center in the Queens Pavilion. Beginning in fall 1954, Queens Hospital Center and Queens College began an experimental two-year nursing program free of tuition, funded by a $50,000 grant from the Board of Higher Education of the City of New York (now the City University of New York). This program would evolve into the Queens Hospital Center School of Nursing. The building was constructed in 1956, and the school opened on September 19, 1956 with 70 students. In January 1959, the hospital boards of Queens General and Triboro Hospital were combined to improve efficiency, completing the merger of the hospitals. In 1962, a city-run medical school was proposed to be built in conjunction with Queens Hospital and Queens College. The school would have been built on then-vacant land between the main Queens General building and Triboro Hospital. In July 1964, QHC signed affiliation deals with the Long Island Jewish Medical Center and Hillside Hospital in Glen Oaks, as well as the now-closed Mary Immaculate Hospital in downtown Jamaica. At this time there were plans to construct an expansion of the medical center in between the Triboro and Queens General buildings, adding up to 1,000 beds. It was projected to be complete by 1970.

=== 1970s ===
By the 1970s, the Triboro Hospital transitioned into a normal hospital within the Queens Hospital complex. At this time, Queens Hospital Center was considered antiquated, with over 90 percent of the hospital beds below state health standards, along with overcrowding of hospital wards and shortages of equipment. The large and open hospital wards with dozens of beds that Queens General and Triboro Hospital were built with were now in violation of modern health codes. In addition, private hospitals often sent unwanted patients to Queens Hospital, which as a municipal hospital could not refuse them. The medical center was referred to as a "snake pit" by city councilman Matthew J. Troy, Jr., in reference to its condition and code violations. Because of this, the city began looking for a site further south, in Jamaica or South Jamaica, to construct a replacement for Queens Hospital Center. The primary location of interest was a site on Liberty Avenue adjacent to the west of the future York College campus between Jamaica and South Jamaica, just south of the Long Island Rail Road Main Line and abutting its Atlantic Branch. Relocation to this area would bring the hospital closer to the majority of its patient population. A new hospital at this site would be served by extensions of New York City Subway lines along Archer Avenue, then being built, and planned further extensions into Southeast Queens. This hospital along with York College and the subway lines would be built as part of the renewal of the downtown Jamaica area during that time, which would create Jamaica Center. Other plans included building on an alternate South Jamaica site, and rebuilding the hospital on its current property. The city also evaluated creating a medical school for the new hospital, to be affiliated with York College, Queens College, or the Stony Brook University School of Medicine then under construction.

The QHC School of Nursing graduated its final class on June 12, 1977. By September of that year, the plans to construct a new hospital had not moved forward. In response, many of the Black members of the QHC community advisory board resigned, accusing the White members of the board and local residents of colluding to keep the hospital in its current location. Local residents and members of Queens Community Board 8 (representing Hillcrest) were in fact opposed to the relocation of the hospital. By 1981, the relocation plans were cancelled due to the city's fiscal crisis.

=== 1990s: Attempts to sell ===
By the 1990s, Queens Hospital Center was deteriorating, with capacity reduced to 300 beds. At the time, the hospital was treating 325,000 patients annually, almost 40 percent of whom were uninsured. In February 1992, Long Island Jewish Medical Center (LIJ) ended its 25-year deal to provide medical residents for rotation at Queens Hospital Center. Afterwards, the Health and Hospitals Corporation began searching for an affiliation with a medical school for QHC. In particular, the city and Mayor David Dinkins were searching for a deal with a "minority" medical school, which would have a majority Black and/or Latino student population that would reflect the hospital's patient demographics. Potential schools included Howard University College of Medicine, Meharry Medical College, and Morehouse School of Medicine, all located outside New York State, as well as the University of Puerto Rico School of Medicine. In April 1992, Mount Sinai Medical Center agreed to supply doctors to the hospital, filling 352 doctor positions (primarily general practice and pediatrics) and 20 medical technician spots. Mount Sinai had already been providing doctors to Elmhurst Hospital Center, another city hospital. In 1993, Mount Sinai assumed control of Queens Hospital's OB-GYN program, replacing LIJ.

A 1992 survey by the Joint Commission on Accreditation of Healthcare Organizations cited Queens Hospital Center for several safety violations, including "dead-end corridors, inadequate egress, poor ventilation and shared toilet facilities." In 1993, the New York City Health and Hospitals Corporation (now NYC Health + Hospitals) began plans for a replacement hospital.

On February 23, 1995, Mayor Rudy Giuliani proposed the sale of all 11 city hospitals operated by the Health and Hospitals Corporation. At this time, the city began accepting bids for sale of Queens Hospital, Elmhurst Hospital Center in western Queens, and Coney Island Hospital in Brooklyn. These three hospitals were selected because they were the "most marketable". A planned $485 million renovation of QHC was cancelled due to a financial crisis and the plans to sell the hospital. $25 million had already been spent by the city on preliminary designs by Henningson, Durham, and Richardson, Inc and Morrison-Knudsen. The plans to sell the hospital also prevented Queens Gateway Secondary School from being moved onto the campus. In March 1995, the pastor of the Ebenezer Baptist Church in Flushing went on a hunger strike in protest of the proposed sales of the hospitals. Later that month, the pastor held a mock funeral outside Queens Hospital in protest. By September 1995, Giuliani and the city explored the possibility of leasing the three hospitals, with the Mount Sinai Health System planning to bid on Queens Hospital Center and Elmhurst Hospital Center. Meanwhile, a third of the Queens Hospital staff had left in the year leading up to fall 1995. The hospital also began charging uninsured patients for services such as prescriptions, which had previously been free of charge, in response to budgetary constraints.

In March 1996, the New York City Council sued Mayor Giuliani over the proposed sale of the hospitals. The conflict over hospitals was one of several power struggles between the mayor and the City Council after the dissolution of the New York City Board of Estimate in 1990. In March 1996, Mount Sinai withdrew bids to take over Queens Hospital and Elmhurst Hospital. Later that month, the Community Advisory Board of QHC also filed suit against the mayor. The plans to sell Coney Island Hospital were blocked by the New York Supreme Court on January 15, 1997. According to the ruling, the 1970 state law creating the Health and Hospitals Corporation did not grant the agency the ability to sell or lease city hospitals; this power had been previously held by the Board of Estimate. By mid-1997, Mayor Giuliani dropped his plans to sell the hospitals.

=== New Queens Hospital Center ===
On August 19, 1997, after the failed sale, Mayor Giuliani announced plans to construct state-of-the-art buildings on the Queens Hospital Center campus. Originally planned with 379 beds, the new hospital later had its capacity reduced to 200. The project was promoted by Queens Borough President Claire Shulman. Ground broke on the new hospital on October 8, 1998. At least three of the original buildings were demolished to make room. The construction of new hospital took place in spite of continuing attempts to sell or privatize the hospital. The project was financed with taxable municipal bonds issued from the Dormitory Authority of the State of New York, in order to lower costs in the event the city decided to sell the hospital in the future. The new Queens Hospital Center, which cost $147 million to construct, was opened December 5, 2001, at a ribbon-cutting ceremony attended by Mayor Giuliani.

Due to the closures of nearby St. Joseph's Hospital and Mary Immaculate Hospital around 2005, Queens Hospital Center saw increases in patients. The new pavilion across from the main hospital was unveiled at a ribbon-cutting ceremony on November 17, 2006, and officially opened in January 2007.

Queens Gateway to Health Sciences Secondary School opened at the north end of the campus in fall 2010. Groundbreaking took place for FDNY EMS Station 50 in December 2013, and the EMS station opened on July 22, 2016. In addition, the Pavilion building was renamed for Shulman in 2025.

== Notable faculty ==
- Dr. Fred Rosner, former director of the Department of Medicine.
- Claire Shulman, registered nurse at Queens Hospital Center; later Queens borough president.
