= The Young Women's Leadership School of Queens =

Public school in New York City

Young Women's Leadership School of Queens
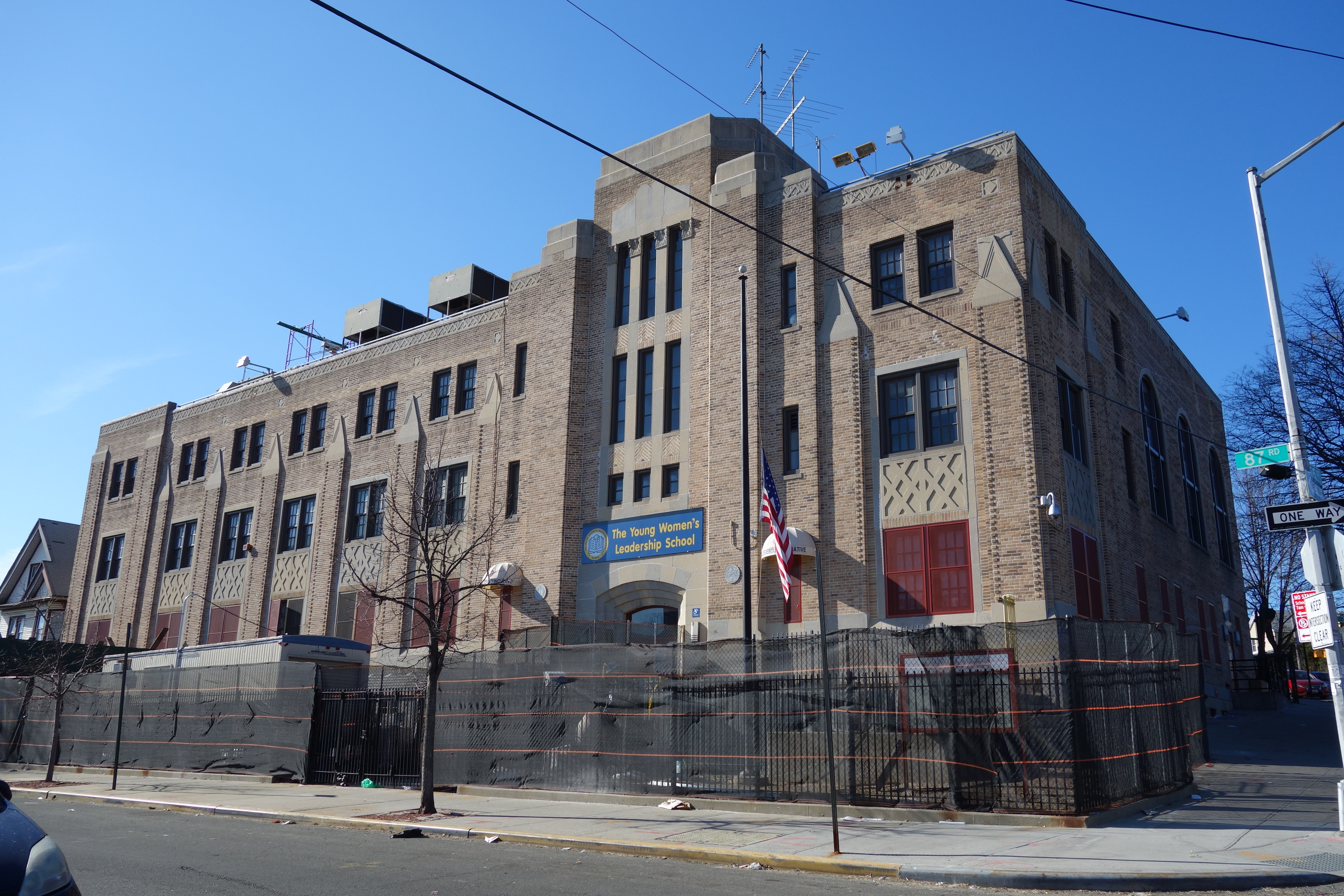
- Looking from 87th Road

Location
- 150-91 87th Road; Jamaica, Queens, New York; United States
- Coordinates: 40°42′30″N 73°48′15″W

Information
- Type: Public middle school and high school
- Established: 2005
- School district: 28
- NCES School ID: 360010005832
- Principal: Mala Panday
- Faculty: 37.91
- Grades: 6–12
- Gender: Female
- Enrollment: 536 (2023–2024)
- Student to teacher ratio: 14.14
- National ranking: 384 in high schools, 148 in middle schools
- Affiliation: Student Leadership Network
- Website: tywlsqueens.com

The Young Women's Leadership School of Queens (TYWLS) is a public girls' high school and middle school located in Jamaica, Queens, New York City. The school is administered by the New York City Department of Education. Since 2013 Mala Panday has been the principal and the assistant principals are Jennifer Pineda and George Díaz. The school has Advisory, a class for individual talking and sharing feelings. In this class, students are free to speak their minds confidentially. In addition to the state required course load, TYWLS of Queens also offers multiple Advanced Placement (AP) courses as well as an array of after school clubs.

The school is located on 87th Road near Parsons Boulevard and Hillside Avenue, in the former Jamaica Jewish Center building. The building was built in 1928, and renovated in 1998 in order to convert it into a school building.

There are four other schools in New York City with the title Young Women's Leadership School, in Harlem, Brooklyn, Astoria, and the Bronx. The school in Harlem is the charter school.
