= Gateway to Higher Education (program) =

The "Gateway Institute for Pre-College Education", begun as the Gateway to Higher Education program was started in New York City in September 1986. Its initial goal was to prepare high school students from demographics underrepresented in science, medicine, and technology, for higher education in those fields. Gateway relies on its strong partnerships with the public school system, medical centers, cultural institutions, universities and research facilities. Based at City University at The City College of New York, the Gateway to Higher Education Program and the New York City Board of Education became partners in 1986 to increase the numbers of students from the public school system entering and completing medical school. The program began at five New York City high schools and has grown to nine programs within large high schools and three stand-alone schools. In 2007, preparations were made to implement a similar program in Roxbury, Massachusetts, at the John D O'Bryant school, which was completing its third year as a Gateway Program (June 2009). It is onto its 5th year at John D. O'Bryant and has around 57 students enrolled in Fall of 2011. The head of the program, Ms. Bettie Nolan is working on making it better and trying to make sure every student in the program is getting the attention they need.

== Early program history ==
=== Program administration ===
According to a program report published in 2000, under directors Morton Slater and Elisabeth Iler, the Gateway program cost $1,600 more per student than the mean per pupil cost of public school in New York City, and relies on careful selection of students and teachers for the program.

=== Requirements for admission ===
Students had to meet certain basic criteria to be accepted into the program. They had to:

- score above the 50th percentile both in New York City’s Seventh Grade Math test and in its Degrees of Reading Power test,
- have regular attendance,
- generally have grades above 80 on a 100-point scale
- strong family support
- desire to pursue a science-based career

== Requirements in Boston, MA as of Summer 2011 ==
In order to get accepted into the Gateway Program, Students at John D. O'Bryant have to:

- Generally have grades above 80 on a 100-point scale
- Hand in two hand-written essays.
- Math teacher recommendation from their former teacher.
- Pass an interview with the Gateway Staff.

=== Students and results ===
Between 1986 and 2000, some 3500 students passed through the Gateway program. The majority were African American and Latino. During the 1999-2000 academic year, for instance, 801 students were enrolled in Gateway Programs or small schools, 60% of whom were African American and 25% Latino; 62% were female.

Students in the program had significantly higher Biology AP scores, SAT scores, graduation rates, and college acceptance rates than national means. As of 2005, over 100 graduates are attending medical school or already practicing medicine.

== Later developments ==
In 1997, the project received a Sloan Public Service Award from the Fund for the City of New York.

More recently, the program has inspired the development of similar programs in other districts.

=== Other Gateway programs ===
In 2005, Howard Hiatt, former Dean of Harvard's School of Public Health, backed a proposal to roll out a Gateway program in Boston. The program would involve 50 students in Roxbury's John D. O'Bryant School of Mathematics & Science. The proposal is to take effect in April 2007.
