= Elmhurst Hospital Center =

- NYC Health + Hospitals

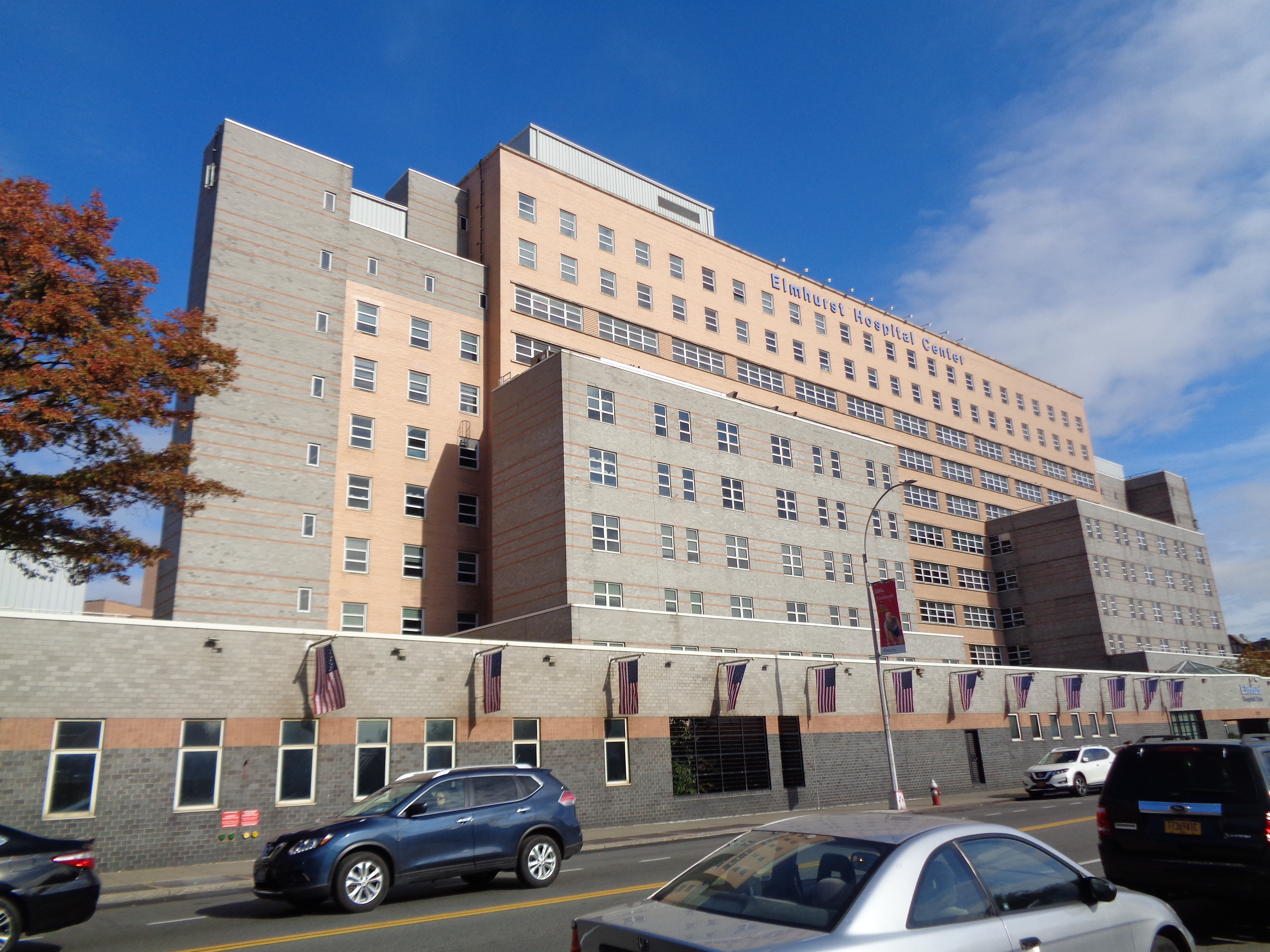

Geography
- Location: 79-01 Broadway, Elmhurst 11373, Queens, New York, United States
- Coordinates: 40°44′41″N 73°53′11″W

Services
- Emergency department: Level I Trauma Center
- Beds: 545

History
- Founded: 1957

Links
- Website: www.nychealthandhospitals.org/elmhurst/
- Lists: Hospitals in New York State
- Other links: Hospitals in Queens

Elmhurst Hospital Center (EHC), also known as NYC Health + Hospitals/Elmhurst, is a 545-bed public hospital in the Elmhurst neighborhood of Queens in New York City. It is one of the 11 acute care hospitals of NYC Health + Hospitals, a public benefit corporation of the city.

The current structure opened in 1957, assuming the operations of the former City Hospital, founded in 1832 on Roosevelt Island. It was renovated in the 1990s. Elmhurst Hospital Center has frequently suffered from equipment shortages because of its small capacity relative to its catchment area, which includes nearly a million people in northwestern Queens. This led to several incidents, including in March 2020 when Elmhurst Hospital became the "center of the center" of the COVID-19 pandemic in New York state, itself an epicenter of the COVID-19 pandemic.

== Description ==
The Elmhurst Hospital Center has 545 beds and occupies a triangular block bounded by Broadway to the southwest, Baxter Avenue to the southeast, and 41st Avenue on the north. Previously, it contained 600 beds, most in clusters of up to six rooms that each shared a single bathroom. There are two wings: the "A" wing running northeast on Baxter Avenue and the "B" wing running northwest on Broadway.

The parking garage to the west of the main hospital contains 600 spaces and was opened in 1993 at a cost of $13 million. When completed, it was privately owned, unlike the garages at most public hospitals in New York City. This is because Ridgemont Parking Structures, the original contractor, planned to turn ownership over to the city when the garage was completed; when Ridgemont went bankrupt, the parking structure was completed by private investors.

The Q53 SBS bus route runs along Broadway on the southwest side of the hospital. The closest New York City Subway stations are the Jackson Heights–Roosevelt Avenue/74th Street station and the Elmhurst Avenue station.

== Service area ==
Elmhurst Hospital, located in Northwest Queens, predominantly serves neighborhoods in northwest, west-central, and western Queens, mostly the area west of Interstate 678 and north of Atlantic Avenue, except for Middle Village, Rego Park, Forest Hills, and Kew Gardens. The areas served by Elmhurst Hospital include Astoria, Long Island City, Sunnyside, Woodside, Jackson Heights, Elmhurst, Corona, East Elmhurst, Maspeth, Glendale, Ridgewood, Woodhaven, and Richmond Hill, as well as part of downtown Flushing. As of 2016, over 59 percent of the catchment area identifies as Hispanic or Latino. Of the remainder, 19 percent identifies as Asian or Pacific Islander, 11 percent identifies as White, 8 percent identifies as Black, and 3 percent identify as some other race. Much of the population is foreign-born and low income.

== History ==
The hospital traces its history back to City Hospital, an institution founded in 1832 on present-day Roosevelt Island. City Hospital was the second-oldest public hospital in the city and primarily served the poor. It stopped operating in 1957 but remains standing.

=== 20th century ===
The City Hospital facility was relocated to the Elmhurst neighborhood of northwestern Queens in 1957, and renamed Elmhurst Hospital. The hospital initially was known as the Elmhurst General Hospital when it opened on March 18, 1957. The opening of the psychiatric ward was delayed due to a lack of staff. At the time of Elmhurst Hospital's opening, there was a shortage of ambulances across Queens, so in June 1957, two ambulances were delivered to the hospital for its emergency service. The two emergency-service ambulances started operating in August 1957, and a third ambulance was set to be activated later that year, when the hospital's psychiatric ward was scheduled to open. The psychiatric ward did not open until April 1958, and even then, most psychiatric patients in Elmhurst Hospital's catchment area were initially sent to Kings County Hospital Center because of limited capacity at Elmhurst Hospital. In the first three months of operation, Elmhurst Hospital's psychiatric ward served only 64 patients, who were housed in two wards with 12 beds each.

In 1975, a "language bank" was founded at Elmhurst Hospital, with 50 to 60 interpreters providing service in over 20 languages spoken by the 700,000 people in the hospital's catchment area. Prior to the founding of the "language bank", services in languages other than English was limited and haphazard, and were dependent on whether a medical staff member spoke the language. By the late 1970s, Elmhurst Hospital was experiencing shortages of nurses and intensive care beds. The shortage led to the deaths of three patients who were connected to respirators, which in turn prompted a homicide investigation, though doctors and administrators identified the lack of nurses and beds as the cause of the deaths. This prompted the hospital to hire 50 extra nurses in 1978. At the time, Elmhurst Hospital accommodated 20,000 patients per year.

A renovation of Elmhurst Hospital started in 1989. The project involved modernizing equipment and extending the available space on the upper five floors of the "A" and "B" wings. Originally slated to cost $200 million and be completed in 1994, it was delayed by two years, with the cost rising by $50 million. The delays were attributed to the difficulty in moving medical labs and nursing stations; challenges in building the parking deck; the bankruptcy of a major contractor; strike actions that occurred after a non-union contractor was hired; and the excessive number of contractors on the project. The renovation did not add any extra beds. The garage was completed in 1993 after multiple delays. During the project, hospital employees had been given permission to park their cars in a city playground across Broadway, which had prompted protests and a lawsuit from neighborhood residents, although the New York City Health and Hospitals Corporation had promised to repair any damage to the playground.

New York City mayor Rudy Giuliani proposed leasing the Elmhurst Hospital, Queens Hospital, and Coney Island Hospital in 1995. The three hospitals collectively cost the city $1.7 billion to operate over each decade. Mount Sinai Health System considered taking up the lease, but the plan was met with opposition from hospital advocates, and Mount Sinai eventually rejected the plan in 1996.

=== 21st century ===
By the 2000s, due to the high ethnic diversity of surrounding areas, Elmhurst Hospital implemented programs to cater to patients' different cultural practices. In 2005, The New York Times reported that the 500,000 patients that visited Elmhurst Hospital the previous year spoke over 100 languages or dialects, and that "roughly half" needed an interpreter because they spoke so little English. As a result, signs were ordered in several additional languages, and dozens of multilingual staff members were given extra training. The Hope Pavilion for cancer patients was opened in 2008.

The hospital continued to suffer from shortages of equipment, as well as long delays. A city audit in 2011 found that during the 2009 fiscal year, waiting times for mammograms were the longest of nine public hospitals that were audited. Prior to the onset of the COVID-19 pandemic, the hospital was operating at 80% capacity. When the pandemic spread to the New York City area in March 2020, available beds were quickly filled up and patients without COVID-19 were transferred to other facilities. During the pandemic, 13 people died in a single day, including at least one who died while waiting for a bed. In the last week of March 2020, Elmhurst Hospital became the "center of the center" of the COVID-19 pandemic in New York as the state itself became an epicenter of the global pandemic. The hospital rented a refrigerator truck for a morgue, set up temporary hospital tents, and received donations of 40 ventilators from the city in late March to help COVID patients breathe. Prior to the donations, Elmhurst Hospital had 63 ventilators. It also received 40 BiPAP machines from Tesla, Inc. Admissions decreased during the first week of April, but doctors said that they were sending home patients who would have been admitted if there were space for them.
