= Parsons Boulevard =

Road in Queens, New York

- Owner: City of New York
- Maintained by: NYCDOT
- Length: 6.2 mi (10.0 km); Four disjointed sections
- Location: Queens, New York City
- South end: Archer Avenue in Downtown Jamaica
- Major junctions: NY 25 in Jamaica; Grand Central Parkway in Jamaica Hills; I-495 in Kew Gardens Hills; NY 25A in Flushing
- North end: 144th Street in Malba

Parsons Boulevard is a road in Queens, New York. The north-south street’s northern end is at Malba Drive in the Malba neighborhood while the southern end is at Archer Avenue in the central-downtown area of the Jamaica neighborhood.

== Route ==
The road stretches for nearly six miles, divided into four segments:

- Malba Drive to Whitestone Expressway: 0.4 miles (0.6 km)
- Whitestone Expressway to Rose Avenue at Kissena Park: 3.0 miles (4.8 km)
- Booth Memorial Avenue to Horace Harding Expressway: 0.2 miles (0.3 km)
- Horace Harding Expressway to Archer Avenue: 2.6 miles (4.2 km)

== History ==
Obituary for Samuel Bowne Parsons Sr., Brooklyn Daily Eagle, January 4, 1906

Parsons Boulevard takes its name from Samuel Bowne Parsons Sr. (1819–1906). His father was Samuel Parsons (1774–1841) who moved to Flushing from Manhattan around 1800 and married Mary Bowne, a descendant of prominent local settler John Bowne. Samuel Bowne Parsons Sr. was an accomplished and well noted horticulturist, who was the first to import Japanese Maples and propagate rhododendrons. Parsons' nursery was located within present-day Kissena Park.

The oldest section of Parsons Boulevard is between Kissena Boulevard in Kew Gardens Hills and Archer Avenue in Jamaica. Dating to the colonial period, this segment, together with Kissena Boulevard, connected the early settlements of Jamaica and Flushing. The most recent section of Parsons Boulevard was completed in 1951, during the construction of the Pomonok apartments. In contrast to most boulevards in Queens, Parsons is not regarded as a major transportation route because it is broken into four segments, with the section through Kissena Park having never been built, along with the Whitestone Expressway and Long Island Expressway interrupting its route.

== Transportation ==
Parsons Boulevard is served by the following bus routes:

- The Q44 and select QM2 buses run between Willets Point Boulevard and 14th Avenue, along with the Q20 south of 20th Avenue.
  - The Union Street local stop is on Willets Point.
- All Q25 buses run between Kissena Boulevard and either Jamaica Avenue (Jamaica), or Archer Avenue (opposite terminals). They are joined with the Q65 at Hillside Avenue.
- After terminating in Jamaica, the Q111, Q113, and Q114 buses run from Hillside Avenue to Archer Avenue for their opposite terminals. The Q112 follows suit but its Jamaica terminus is at 89th Avenue and it leaves at Jamaica Avenue, along with most Q110 buses from 88th Avenue.
- The Electchester-bound Q64 runs from Jewel Avenue to 71st Avenue.
- The Q26 and Q27 buses runs between Sanford & 46th Avenues.

Parsons Boulevard is served by the following New York City Subway stations in Queens:

- Parsons Boulevard, on the IND Queens Boulevard Line, served by the E, F, and <F> trains
- Jamaica Center–York College, on the IND and BMT Archer Avenue Lines, served by the E, J, and Z trains
