= New York's 27th State Assembly district =

New York State Assembly district

Assemblymember
| Sam Berger; D–Kew Gardens Hills |
- Registration: 55.2% Democratic; 16.3% Republican; 25.4% No party preference
- Demographics: 38% White; 7% Black; 28% Hispanic; 23% Asian; 0% Native American; 0% Hawaiian/Pacific Islander; 1% Other; 3% Multiracial
- Population (2020): 126,058
- Registered voters: 68,959

New York's 27th State Assembly district is one of the 150 districts in the New York State Assembly in the United States. The seat is represented by Sam Berger since a special election in 2023, succeeding Daniel Rosenthal.

== Geography ==
District 27 is located in Queens, comprising the neighborhoods of Beechhurst, Kew Gardens Hills, Kew Gardens, College Point, Malba, Pomonok and Whitestone. Most of Flushing Meadows–Corona Park is within this district.

The district overlaps (partially) with New York's 3rd, 5th, 6th and 14th congressional districts, the 11th, 14th and 16th districts of the New York State Senate, and the 19th, 20th, 21st, 24th and 29th districts of the New York City Council.

=== 2010s ===
District 27 is located in Queens, comprising the neighborhoods of Kew Gardens Hills, Kew Gardens, College Point, Malba, and Pomonok.

== Recent election results ==
=== 2026 ===
2026 New York State Assembly election, District 27
| Party | Candidate | Votes | % |
|---|---|---|---|
| Democratic | Sam Berger | | |
| Conservative | Sam Berger | | |
| Total | Sam Berger (incumbent) | | |
| Write-in | | | |
| Total votes | | | 100.0 |

=== 2024 ===
2024 New York State Assembly election, District 27
| Party | Candidate | Votes | % |
|---|---|---|---|
| Democratic | Samuel Berger (incumbent) | 20,429 | 57.3 |
| Republican | Angelo King | 15,150 | 42.5 |
| Write-in | | 96 | 0.3 |
| Total votes | | 35,675 | 100.0 |
| Democratic hold | | | |

=== 2023 special ===
Incumbent Daniel Rosenthal resigned his seat on July 14th, 2023, triggering a special election. In special elections for state legislative offices, primaries are usually not held – county committee members and district leaders for each party select nominees. Election was held on September 12th, 2023.

2023 New York State Assembly special election, District 27
| Party | Candidate | Votes | % |
|---|---|---|---|
| Democratic | Samuel Berger | 2,555 | 55.3 |
| Republican | David Hirsch | 1,796 | |
| Conservative | David Hirsch | 261 | |
| Total | David Hirsch | 2,057 | 44.5 |
| Write-in | | 12 | 0.3 |
| Total votes | | 4,624 | 100.0 |
| Democratic hold | | | |

=== 2022 ===
2022 New York State Assembly election, District 27
| Party | Candidate | Votes | % |
|---|---|---|---|
| Democratic | Daniel Rosenthal (incumbent) | 13,763 | 58.0 |
| Republican | Angelo King | 9,286 | |
| Conservative | Angelo King | 651 | |
| Total | Angelo King | 9,937 | 41.9 |
| Write-in | | 26 | 0.1 |
| Total votes | | 23,726 | 100.0 |
| Democratic hold | | | |

=== 2020 ===
2020 New York State Assembly election, District 27
| Party | Candidate | Votes | % |
|---|---|---|---|
| Democratic | Daniel Rosenthal (incumbent) | 30,789 | 98.8 |
| Write-in | | 375 | 1.2 |
| Total votes | | 31,164 | 100.0 |
| Democratic hold | | | |

=== 2018 ===
2018 New York State Assembly election, District 27
| Party | Candidate | Votes | % |
|---|---|---|---|
| Democratic | Daniel Rosenthal | 19,305 | |
| Working Families | Daniel Rosenthal | 1,794 | |
| Total | Daniel Rosenthal (incumbent) | 21,099 | 99.2 |
| Write-in | | 162 | 0.8 |
| Total votes | | 21,261 | 100.0 |
| Democratic hold | | | |

=== 2017 special ===
Incumbent Michael Simanowitz died on September 2nd, 2017, triggering a special election. In special elections for state legislative offices, primaries are usually not held – county committee members and district leaders for each party select nominees. Election was held on November 7th, 2017.

2017 New York State Assembly special election, District 27
| Party | Candidate | Votes | % |
|---|---|---|---|
| Democratic | Daniel Rosenthal | 10,248 | 98.5 |
| Write-in | | 152 | 1.5 |
| Total votes | | 10,400 | 100.0 |
| Democratic hold | | | |

=== 2016 ===
2016 New York State Assembly election, District 27
| Party | Candidate | Votes | % |
|---|---|---|---|
| Democratic | Michael Simanowitz | 23,167 | |
| Republican | Michael Simanowitz | 8,003 | |
| Conservative | Michael Simanowitz | 1,024 | |
| Total | Michael Simanowitz (incumbent) | 32,194 | 99.7 |
| Write-in | | 94 | 0.3 |
| Total votes | | 32,288 | 100.0 |
| Democratic hold | | | |

=== 2014 ===
2014 New York State Assembly election, District 27
| Party | Candidate | Votes | % |
|---|---|---|---|
| Democratic | Michael Simanowitz | 9,054 | |
| Conservative | Michael Simanowitz | 1,440 | |
| Independence | Michael Simanowitz | 513 | |
| Total | Michael Simanowitz (incumbent) | 11,007 | 99.3 |
| Write-in | | 80 | 0.7 |
| Total votes | | 11,087 | 100.0 |
| Democratic hold | | | |

=== 2012 ===
2012 New York State Assembly election, District 27
| Party | Candidate | Votes | % |
|---|---|---|---|
| Democratic | Michael Simanowitz | 21,259 | |
| Conservative | Michael Simanowitz | 2,898 | |
| Total | Michael Simanowitz (incumbent) | 24,157 | 99.6 |
| Write-in | | 91 | 0.4 |
| Total votes | | 24,248 | 100.0 |
| Democratic win (new boundaries) | | | |

=== 2011 special ===
Incumbent Nettie Mayersohn resigned her seat on April 1st, 2011, triggering a special election. In special elections for state legislative offices, primaries are usually not held – county committee members and district leaders for each party select nominees. Election was held on September 13th, 2011.

2011 New York State Assembly special election, District 27
| Party | Candidate | Votes | % |
|---|---|---|---|
| Democratic | Michael Simanowitz | 6,451 | |
| Independence | Michael Simanowitz | 361 | |
| Working Families | Michael Simanowitz | 345 | |
| Total | Michael Simanowitz | 7,157 | 76.1 |
| Republican | Marco Desena | 1,929 | |
| Conservative | Marco Desena | 280 | |
| Total | Marco Desena | 2,209 | 23.5 |
| Write-in | | 34 | 0.4 |
| Total votes | | 9,400 | 100.0 |
| Democratic hold | | | |

=== 2010 ===
2010 New York State Assembly election, District 27
| Party | Candidate | Votes | % |
|---|---|---|---|
| Democratic | Nettie Mayersohn | 12,517 | |
| Independence | Nettie Mayersohn | 1,527 | |
| Total | Nettie Mayersohn (incumbent) | 14,044 | 99.2 |
| Write-in | | 108 | 0.8 |
| Total votes | | 14,152 | 100.0 |
| Democratic hold | | | |

=== 2008 ===
2008 New York State Assembly election, District 27
| Party | Candidate | Votes | % |
|---|---|---|---|
| Democratic | Nettie Mayersohn (incumbent) | 20,849 | 100.0 |
| Write-in | | 6 | 0.0 |
| Total votes | | 20,855 | 100.0 |
| Democratic hold | | | |

=== 2006 ===
2006 New York State Assembly election, District 27
| Party | Candidate | Votes | % |
|---|---|---|---|
| Democratic | Nettie Mayersohn | 12,036 | |
| Independence | Nettie Mayersohn | 570 | |
| Total | Nettie Mayersohn (incumbent) | 12,606 | 94.2 |
| Conservative | Walter Lamp | 769 | 5.7 |
| Write-in | | 3 | 0.0 |
| Total votes | | 13,378 | 100.0 |
| Democratic hold | | | |

=== 2004 ===
2004 New York State Assembly election, District 27
| Party | Candidate | Votes | % |
|---|---|---|---|
| Democratic | Nettie Mayersohn (incumbent) | 20,698 | 100.0 |
| Total votes | | 20,698 | 100.0 |
| Democratic hold | | | |

=== 2002 ===
2002 New York State Assembly election, District 27
| Party | Candidate | Votes | % |
|---|---|---|---|
| Democratic | Nettie Mayersohn | 10,671 | |
| Working Families | Nettie Mayersohn | 408 | |
| Liberal | Nettie Mayersohn | 349 | |
| Total | Nettie Mayersohn (incumbent) | 11,428 | 100.0 |
| Write-in | | 4 | 0.0 |
| Total votes | | 11,432 | 100.0 |
| Democratic hold | | | |

=== 2000 ===
2000 New York State Assembly election, District 27
| Party | Candidate | Votes | % |
|---|---|---|---|
| Democratic | Nettie Mayersohn | 22,606 | |
| Liberal | Nettie Mayersohn | 739 | |
| Total | Nettie Mayersohn (incumbent) | 23,345 | 100.0 |
| Write-in | | 6 | 0.0 |
| Total votes | | 23,351 | 100.0 |
| Democratic hold | | | |

=== Federal results in Assembly District 27 ===
| Year | Office | Results |
|---|---|---|
| 2024 | President | Trump 53.5 – 45.3% |
| 2024 | Senate | Gillibrand 49.9 - 49.4% |
| 2022 | Senate | Schumer 50.3 – 49.3% |
| 2020 | President | Biden 60.3 – 38.6% |
| 2018 | Senate | Gillibrand 72.5 – 27.5% |
| 2016 | President | Clinton 65.5 – 31.6% |
| 2016 | Senate | Schumer 77.3 – 20.5% |
| 2012 | President | Obama 66.1 – 32.8% |
| 2012 | Senate | Gillibrand 75.1 – 23.5% |
