= Kew Gardens Hills, Queens =

Neighborhood in New York City

Kew Gardens Hills
- Neighborhood in Queens
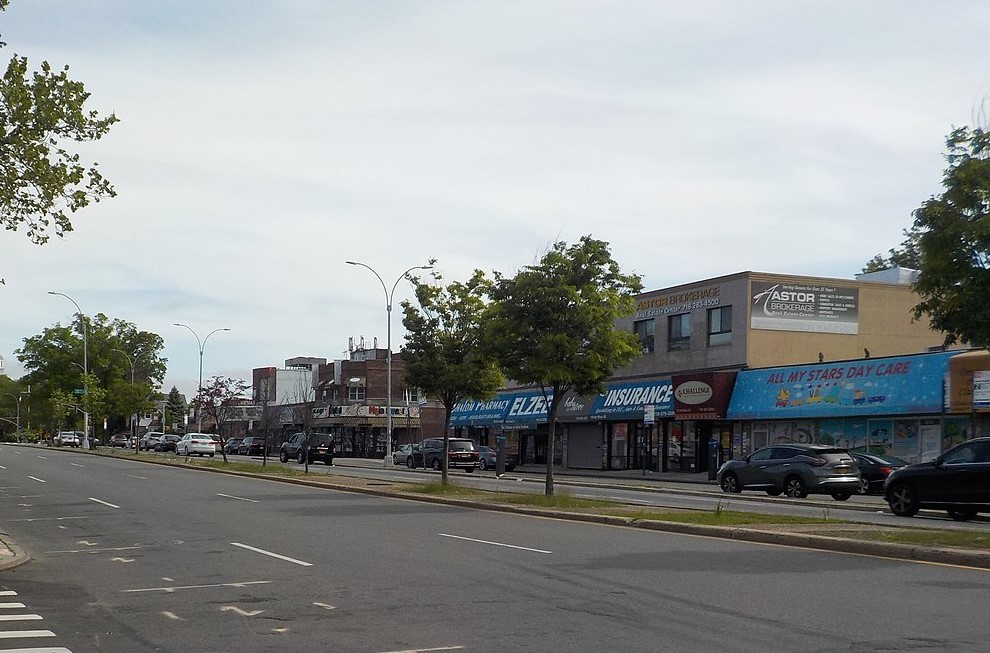
- Main Street, one of the shopping centers of Kew Gardens Hills, May 2020
- Interactive map of Kew Gardens Hills
- Coordinates: 40.725°N 73.815°W
- Country: United States
- State: New York
- City: New York City
- County/Borough: Queens
- Community District: Queens 8
- Named for: Kew Gardens, Queens; in turn named after Royal Botanic Gardens, Kew

Area
  - Total: 1.0 sq mi (2.6 km^{2})

Population (2010 United States census)
  - Total: 37,479

Race
  - White: 53.9%
  - Asian: 20.0%
  - Hispanic: 14.8%
  - Black: 7.6%
  - Other: 3.7%

Economics
  - Median income: $95,847
- Time zone: UTC−5 (EST)
  - Summer (DST): UTC−4 (EDT)
- ZIP Code: 11367
- Area codes: 718, 347, 929, and 917

Kew Gardens Hills is a neighborhood in the middle of the New York City borough of Queens. The borders are Flushing Meadows–Corona Park to the west, the Long Island Expressway to the north, Union Turnpike to the south, and Kissena/Parsons Boulevards to the east.

The neighborhood is located near several highways including the Long Island Expressway, Grand Central Parkway, Van Wyck Expressway, and the Jackie Robinson Parkway (Interborough). It is also served by several bus routes. Adjacent neighborhoods include Forest Hills to the west, Pomonok and Hillcrest to both the east and southeast, Briarwood to the south, and Queensboro Hill to the north.

Kew Gardens Hills is located in Queens Community District 8 and its ZIP Code is 11367. It is patrolled by the New York City Police Department's 107th Precinct. Politically, Kew Gardens Hills is represented by the New York City Council's 24th District.

== Geography ==
Kew Gardens Hills is situated in the southwestern corner of the area historically known as the Town of Flushing, in its 6th district.

As neighborhoods in the City of New York are not designated by the city, there are multiple means to determine the geographical boundaries of the area:

- General borders: The western boundary of the neighborhood is considered to be Flushing Meadows–Corona Park, which is separated from the neighborhood by the Van Wyck Expressway. The southern playground of the park however is east of the Van Wyck Expressway, and is only accessible via an entrance along Park Drive East. Though part of the park, the playground is considered within Kew Gardens Hills. Prior to the building of the Van Wyck Expressway, the IND World's Fair Line ran along this route during the 1939 New York World's Fair.
- Postal boundaries: Since 2003, when the United States Postal Services renamed the post office in ZIP Code 11367 to the "Kew Gardens Hills Post Office", the borders of the area for ZIP Code purposes extend from the south at Union Turnpike, to the north at the Horace Harding Expressway and east to Parsons Boulevard. Prior to 2003 this Post office was called the Station C Post Office. Although the post office is named "Kew Gardens Hills", the USPS still designates the city or town for purposes of addressing as "Flushing".
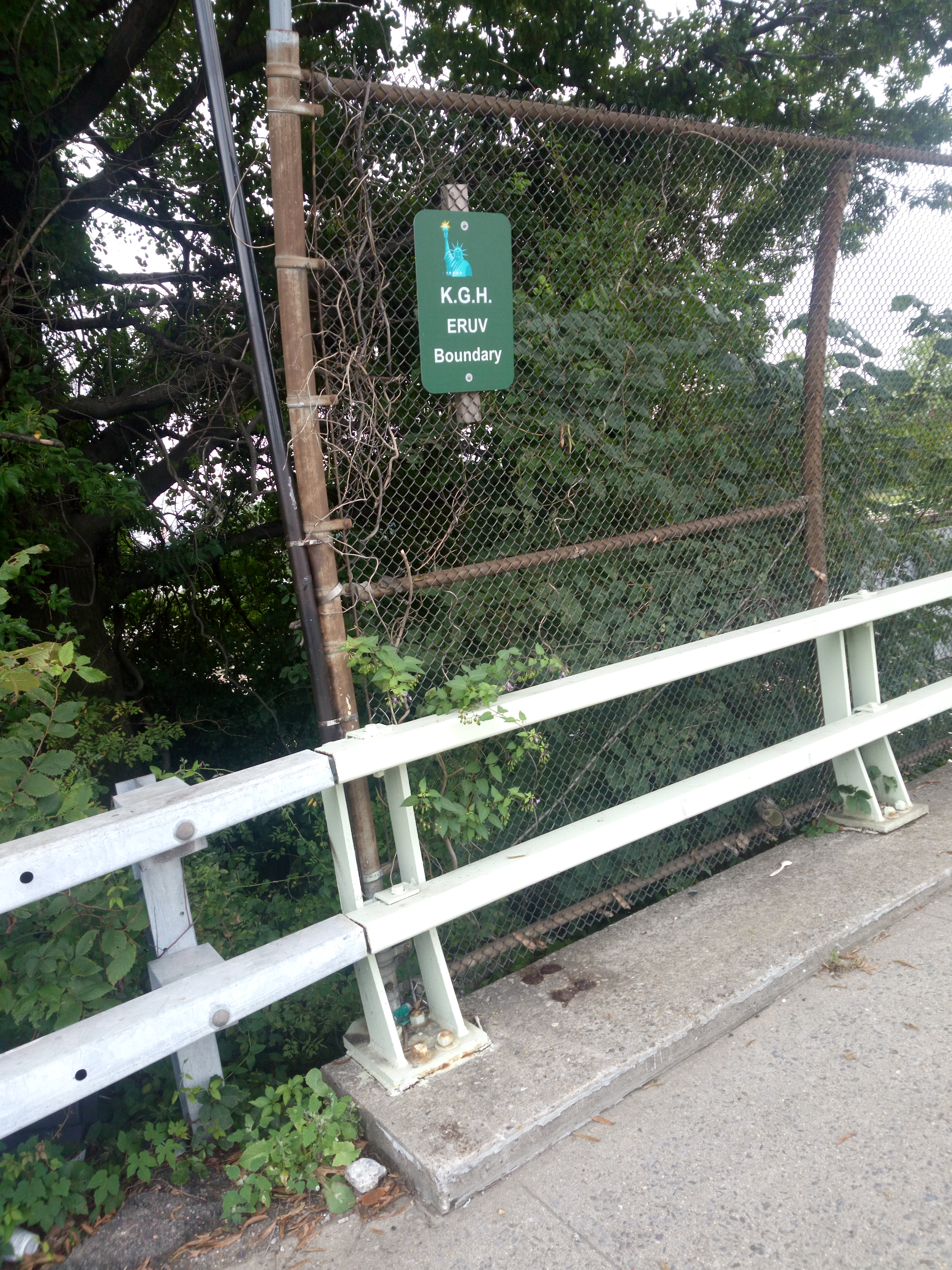
  Boundary sign located over Flushing Meadows-Corona Park demarcating an Eruv boundary of Kew Gardens Hills
- Other designations: Some areas, east of Parsons Boulevard and west of 164th Street, as well as south of Union Turnpike and north of the Grand Central Parkway are included in Kew Gardens Hills, by the NYC Department of Education, historians, the Kew Gardens Hills Eruv Committee, by residents or businesses themselves, or by real estate brokers.
  In these extended areas—with the exception of some zig-zag borders—residents north of 73rd Avenue use ZIP 11365, south of 73rd Avenue, ZIP 11366, and south of Union Turnpike, ZIPs 11432 and 11435. These areas include the Pomonok, Electchester, and Parkway Village developments, among others. Despite the ZIP Codes with the first three digits as "114" being originally designated in the postal city of "Jamaica", these areas of Kew Gardens Hills are within the geographical limits of the original Town of Flushing. The present 164th Street runs along the original border between the 4th and 6th districts of the town of Flushing.

Adjacent neighborhoods include Forest Hills to the west, Hillcrest and Pomonok to the east, Briarwood to the south, and Queensboro Hill to the north.

== History ==
=== Early settlement ===
In the northwestern part of the neighborhood was the location of the 120 acres (49 ha) Spring Hill Farm. The farm was part of the Francis Lewis estate during colonial times. By 1762 the farm was owned by Colonel Thomas Willet, High Sheriff of Flushing, and was sold to Cadwallader Colden, lieutenant governor for the province of New York. In 1763 Colden built the Spring Hill House on the property. In 1783 the property was confiscated by the government because Cadwallader's son David was a loyalist to the monarchy. By 1894 the Durkee family owned the property and sold it to the Cedar Grove Cemetery Corporation. The Spring Hill House became the office of the Cedar Grove Cemetery, until the house was later destroyed by a fire.

In the 19th century the area of Kew Gardens Hills was known as Head of the Fly, for its location at the headwaters of the Flushing Creek (or Flushing River). Fly or vly, being the Dutch word for swamp. One of the oldest roads through the area was called the Vleigh Road, and still exists today as Vleigh Place.

Timothy Jackson operated a horse boarding stable near where the intersection of Park Drive East and Union Turnpike, or the Kew Gardens Interchange is today. On what is now the Jamaica subway yard was previously a horse race course, built by Timothy Jackson, and was known as Whitepot Race & Track. Although the train yard is not in Jamaica, it is named Jamaica because the yard feeds the subway lines which begin (or end) in Jamaica. This area was an extension of Timothy Jackson's Willow Glen Farm for which the farmhouse was located south of Union Turnpike in the neighborhood of Jamaica that is now called Briarwood. In the 1750s, William Furman was the owner of the farm he named Willow Glen. Today Willow Lake, at the southern end of Flushing Meadows–Corona Park, retains the Willow name.

The municipal government of the Town of Flushing, which dated back to colonial times, along with other municipal township governments in Queens County, was incorporated into the Borough of Queens on January 1, 1898. Later, the area, was named after Kew Gardens, which in 1909 was renamed after Royal Botanic Gardens, Kew, in London, England.

The area's earliest modern homes were built in 1917 off Union Turnpike, but in the early 20th century, the area was known as Queens Valley and consisted mostly of farmland. By the 1920s many of the farms were sold to golf clubs or country clubs. The golf courses that made up the area include the Spring Hill Golf Course, Queens Valley Golf Course, Pomonok Country Club, and Arrowbrook Country Club. In 1939, the Arrowbrook Country Club was the home of the "Summer City Hall" of Mayor La Guardia.

One road that ran through the area was called Quarrelsome Lane, which ran from Jamaica Road to Fresh Meadow Road; the road is now known as 75th Avenue. Jamaica Road, the most direct route between the villages of Flushing and Jamaica, is now Kissena Boulevard and becomes Parsons Boulevard at the intersection of Quarrelsome Lane.

=== Later years ===
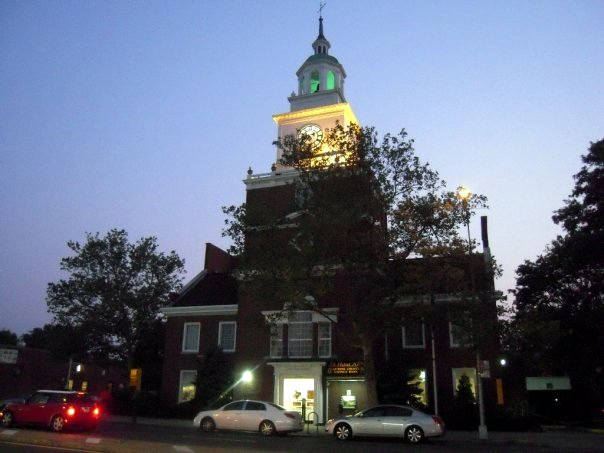
Queens County Savings Bank on Main Street

Growth to Kew Gardens Hills came when Kew Gardens, Queens, to the south, gained a subway line at Queens Boulevard in 1936 and Flushing Meadows–Corona Park, directly to the northwest of the neighborhood, hosted the 1939 New York World's Fair. Early residents were mostly German, Irish and Italian. Many were relocating from Brooklyn and Manhattan. The area was hilly and Kew Gardens was known as a prestigious Queens neighborhood and so developers changed its name from Queens Valley to Kew Gardens Hills.

The first Queen of Peace mass took place in 1939. Property along 144th Street, now part of Main Street, was seized by the city to complete the construction of Main Street from northern Flushing. Main Street was paved and bus routes began to serve the area in 1941. The Jewish Center of Kew Gardens Hills was established in 1941. The Queens County Savings Bank opened its branch in 1949 and local school, P.S. 164, also known as the Queens Valley School, also opened its doors that year.

Main Street Cinemas—designed by architect Joseph Unger, who also designed the Trylon Theatre—opened in 1940 and operated by Interboro Circuit Inc. The 600 seat single screen theater was built at a cost of $75,000, and was dubbed one of the city's finest. The theater was later subdivided into a six screen cineplex and ultimately closed in September 2022.

In 1941, Barney Spiegel bought a part of the Klein Farm at 69th Road and Main Street. On the land, he built 150 duplexes, designed by architect A. Salkowitz.

On July 14, 1965, the neighborhood became infamous when five-year-old Eddie Crimmins Jr. and four-year-old Missy Crimmins vanished from their garden apartment at 150-22 72nd Drive. Missy's body was found the same day in a vacant lot on 71st Avenue at 162nd Street (the area where the 107th Precinct is located today.) Eddie's body was found five days later near 68th Drive and the entrance to the northbound Van Wyck Expressway. The children's mother, Alice Crimmins, was convicted in 1971, and imprisoned, in the death of her children. She was paroled in 1977.

On September 16, 2010, an EF1 tornado touched down in Flushing Meadows–Corona Park, causing widespread damage to cars and homes in the Kew Gardens Hills area. John Bowne High School—located along Main Street at the edge of the CUNY Queens College campus, directly across from Mt. Hebron Cemetery—was the only New York City public school building to sustain physical damage related to the storm and was closed on the day after the storm.

== Demographics ==
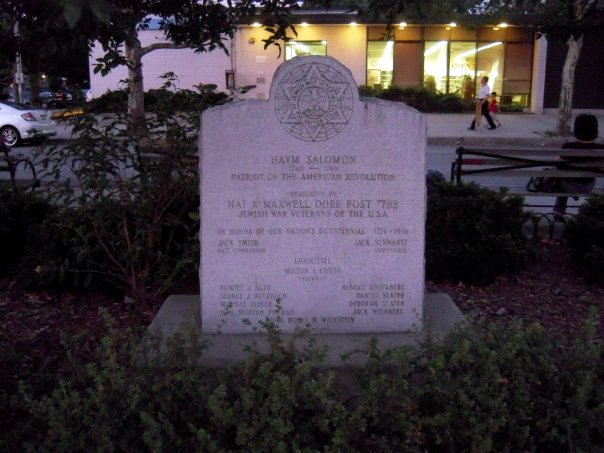
Haym Solomon Square in Kew Gardens Hills.

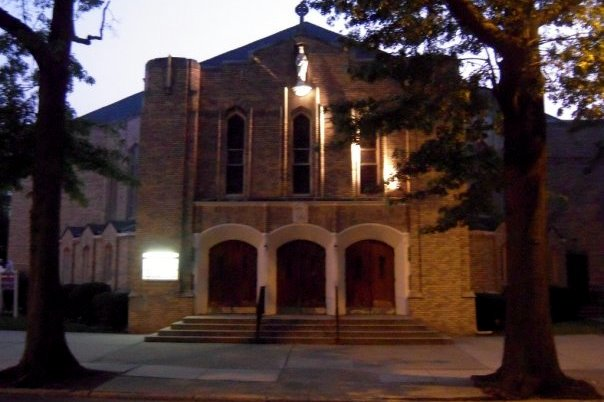
Queen of Peace Catholic Church in Kew Gardens Hills.

Based on data from the 2010 United States census, the population of Kew Gardens Hills was 37,479, an increase of 1,427 (4.0%) from the 36,052 counted in 2000. Covering an area of 873.05 acres (353.31 ha), the neighborhood had a population density of 42.9 inhabitants per acre (27,500/sq mi; 10,600/km^{2}). The racial makeup of the neighborhood was 53.9% (20,184) White, 7.6% (2,839) African American, 0.2% (63) Native American, 20.0% (7,500) Asian, 0.1% (20) Pacific Islander, 0.4% (156) from other races, and 3.1% (1,169) from two or more races. Hispanic or Latino of any race were 14.8% (5,548) of the population.

The entirety of Community Board 8, which comprises Kew Gardens Hills as well as Fresh Meadows and Jamaica Hills, had 156,217 inhabitants as of NYC Health's 2018 Community Health Profile, with an average life expectancy of 83.9 years. This is higher than the median life expectancy of 81.2 for all New York City neighborhoods. Most inhabitants are middle-aged adults and youth: 20% are between the ages of 0–17, 28% between 25 and 44, and 27% between 45 and 64. The ratio of college-aged and elderly residents was lower, at 10% and 15% respectively.

As of 2017, the median household income in Community Board 8 was $64,005. In 2018, an estimated 22% of Kew Gardens Hills residents lived in poverty, compared to 19% in all of Queens and 20% in all of New York City. One in eleven residents (9%) were unemployed, compared to 8% in Queens and 9% in New York City. Rent burden, or the percentage of residents who have difficulty paying their rent, is 54% in Kew Gardens Hills, slightly higher than the boroughwide and citywide rates of 53% and 51% respectively. Based on this calculation, as of 2018, Kew Gardens Hills is considered to be high-income relative to the rest of the city and not gentrifying. The neighborhood has been described as "a largely middle-class area".

The neighborhood contains an established Jewish population, some Israelis and Bukharan Jews, as well as smaller groups of Latinos, Koreans, Chinese, Indians, Afghans and African Americans. Kew Gardens Hills is home to the largest concentration of Afghanis in the New York metropolitan area.

== Religious communities ==
The local Jewish community contains an established Orthodox Jewish population and some Israelis and Bukharan Jews. There are several dozen houses of worship in Kew Gardens Hills, many of them Jewish. Established in 1941, the Jewish Center of Kew Gardens Hills is the only traditional Conservative synagogue located in the heart of Kew Gardens Hills. By the 1950s, the Orthodox Jewish community began to take root.

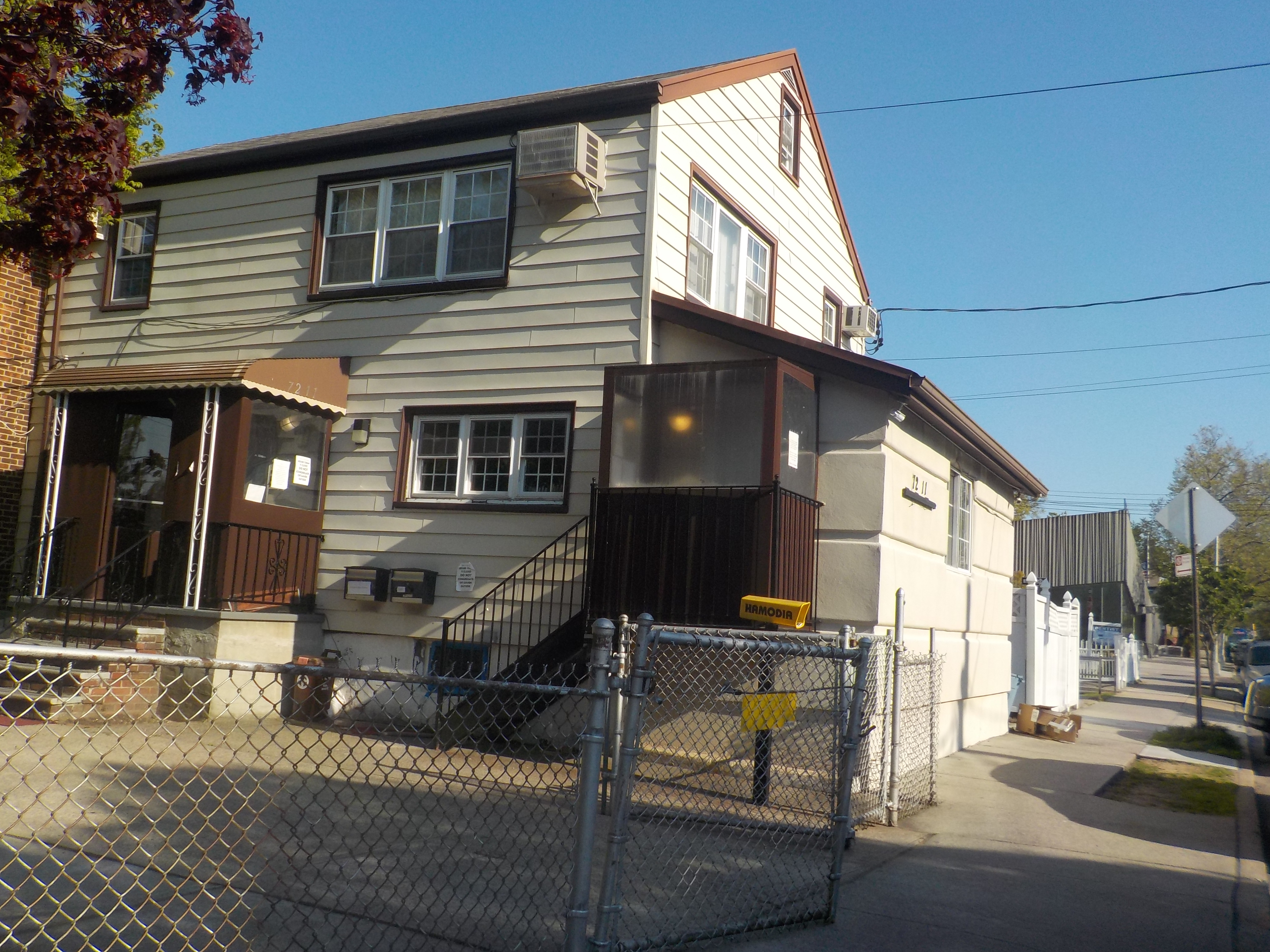
Yeshiva Keser Torah

The first orthodox Jewish synagogue was formed in 1950 on Parsons Boulevard and 78th Road when the Jewish Center of Torath Emeth was formed with Rabbi Joel Laks as the spiritual leader. The following year, the Young Israel Congregation of Kew Gardens Hills was founded in 1951 with 15 families. That congregation now consists of 450 families. Congregation Machzikei Hadas formed by Rabbi Yosef Gelernter on 73rd Avenue, is home to the first mikveh in Kew Gardens Hills. In March 1960, the City Council named a small park at Vleigh Place and Main Street as Freedom Square to commemorate the one hundredth anniversary of the birth of Theodor Herzl, founder of present-day Zionism. The Yeshivas Chafetz Chaim, Ohr Hachaim and Kesser Torah are situated in Kew Gardens Hills. Jewish elementary schools include Yeshiva Ketana of Queens and Yeshiva of Central Queens.

Other houses of worship include the Roman Catholic Church Queen of Peace, located on Main Street at 77th Road. St. Nicholas of Tolentine is located on Parsons Boulevard behind east of Parkway Village. The Lutheran Church of the Ascension is located on Main Street just south of Union Turnpike. The Lutheran Church of the Redeemer, located on 65th Avenue near Parsons Boulevard, is also the facility used by the Korean Grace Community Church.

A sizable Muslim and Sikh population exists, most notably on the northern side with several stores catering to that population.

== Education ==
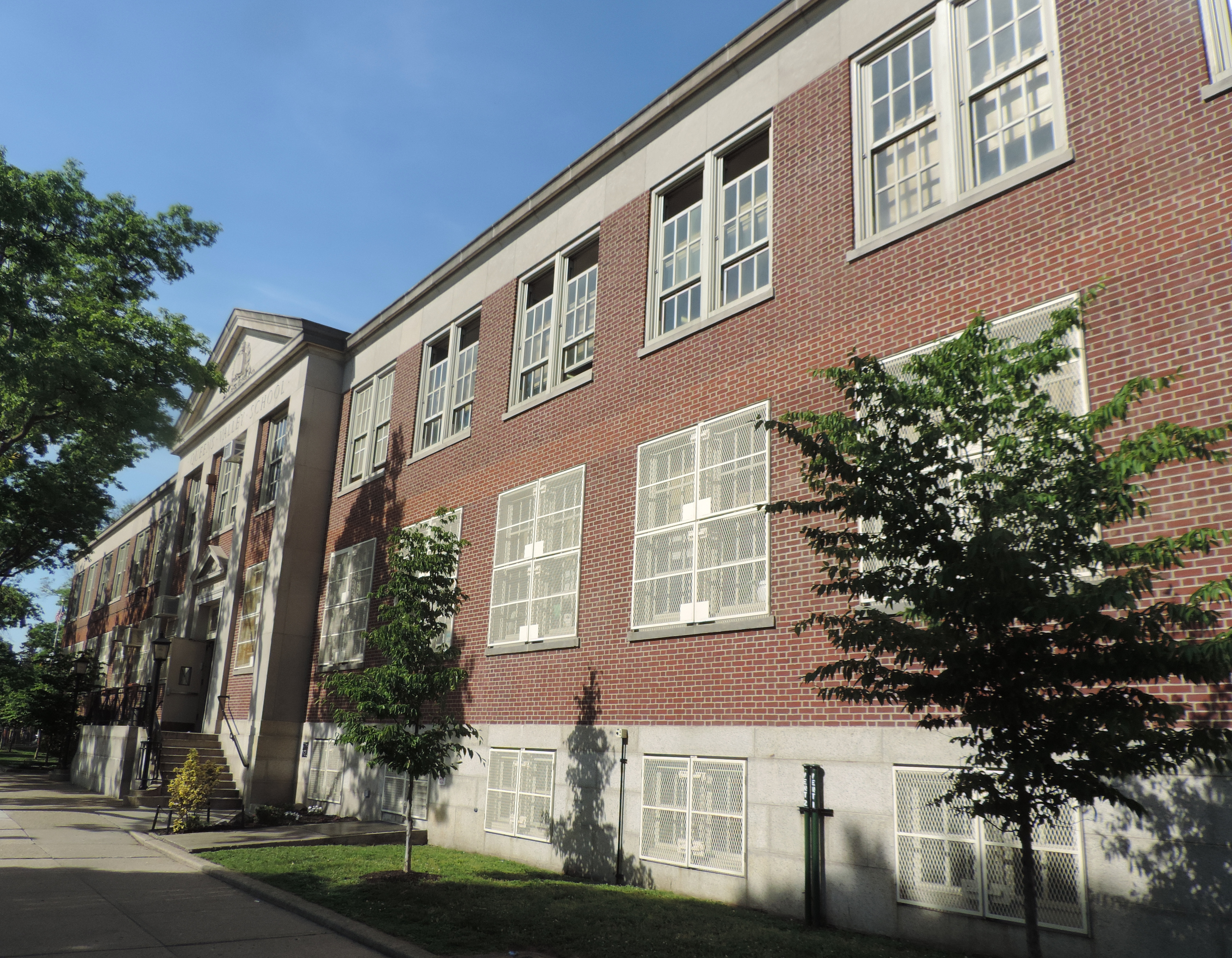
PS 164, Queens Valley School of the Arts

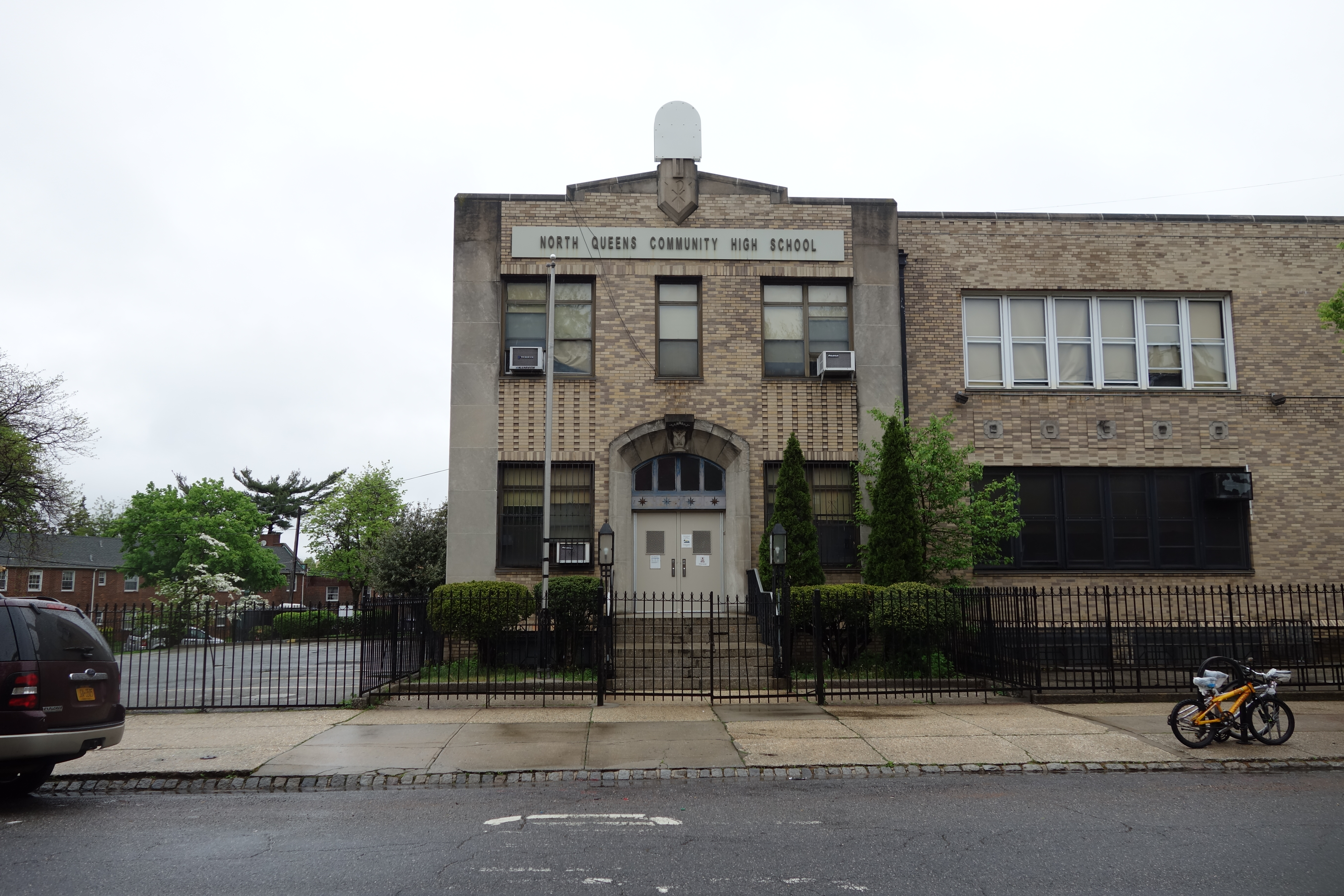
The former Queens of Peace school, now used by the North Queens Community High School.

Kew Gardens Hills generally has a higher ratio of college-educated residents than the rest of the city as of 2018. Half of residents (50%) have a college education or higher, while 14% have less than a high school education and 37% are high school graduates or have some college education. By contrast, 39% of Queens residents and 43% of city residents have a college education or higher. The percentage of Kew Gardens Hills students excelling in math rose from 51 percent in 2000 to 71 percent in 2011, and reading achievement rose from 56% to 57% during the same time period.

Kew Gardens Hills' rate of elementary school student absenteeism is less than the rest of New York City. In Kew Gardens Hills, 15% of elementary school students missed twenty or more days per school year, less than the citywide average of 20%. Additionally, 86% of high school students in Kew Gardens Hills graduate on time, more than the citywide average of 75%.

=== Public schools ===
Kew Gardens Hills' public schools are operated by the New York City Department of Education. The following elementary and middle schools are located in Kew Gardens Hills, serving grades PK-5 unless otherwise indicated:

- PS 154
- PS 219 Paul Klapper (grades PK-5, 8)
- PS 201 The Discovery School for Inquiry and Research
- PS 255 (grades PK-5, 8)

The following elementary-middle schools are located in Kew Gardens Hills and serve grades PK-8:

- PS 164 Queens Valley
- PS 165 Edith K. Bergtraum
- The Queens College School for Math, Science and Technology
- PS/MS 200 – The Pomonok School & STAR Academy

The following middle schools are located within Kew Gardens Hills:

- I.S. 250 The Robert F. Kennedy Community Middle School (grades 6–8)
- The Queens School of Inquiry (grades 6–12)

High schools in New York City are not zoned. The following high schools are located within Kew Gardens Hills and serve grades 9–12:

- John Bowne High School
- Robert F. Kennedy Community High School
- Townsend Harris High School serves academically gifted students.
- North Queens Community High School, founded in 2007 in the former Queens of Peace school building, which serves troubled New York City youths who wish to obtain their high school diploma.

=== Colleges and universities ===
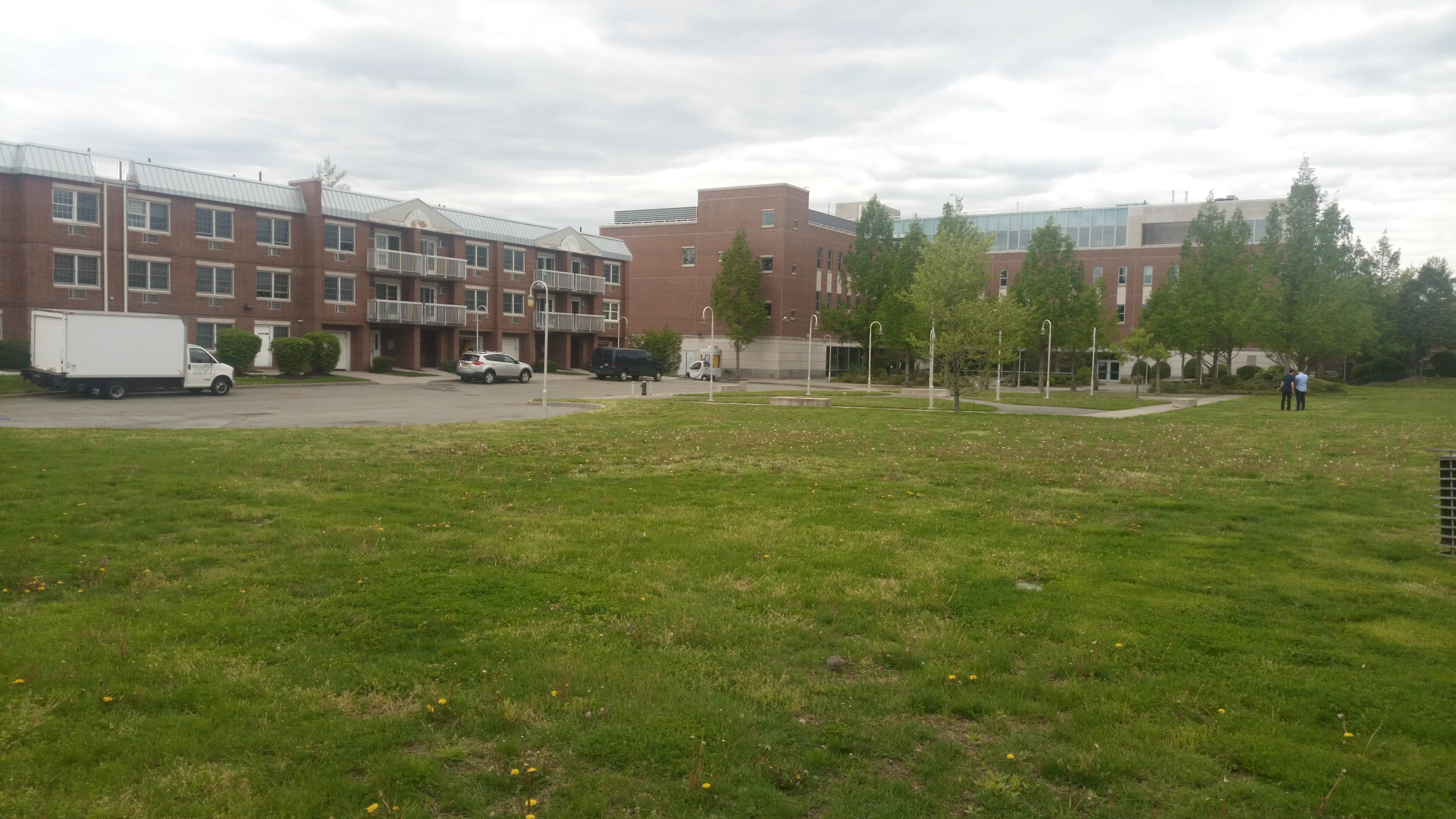
Lander College Campus

Two university campuses are located in Kew Gardens Hills. Located in the northern portion of Kew Gardens Hills is Queens College, a liberal arts college that is part of the City University of New York (CUNY) system. Queens College also serves as an important cultural institution for neighborhood residents with Colden Center for the Performing Arts and the Godwin-Ternbach Museum.

Notable graduates of Queens College include native son Jerry Seinfeld, who was awarded an honorary doctorate in 1994, Ron Jeremy, and Paul Simon.

Lander College, the men's college of Touro College, has a large campus on 150th Street at 75th Road.

=== Private schools ===
Yeshiva Chofetz Chaim (76th Road & 147th Street), Lander College for Men (75th Road and 150th Street, a division of Touro College), and Yeshivas Ohr HaChaim (71st Avenue & Main Street, a division of Touro College) are large yeshivas located in Kew Gardens Hills.

Other religious schools located in Kew Gardens Hills include St. Nicholas of Tolentine, Shevach High School (Main Street at 75th Road), Mesivta Yesodei Yeshurun, Yeshiva of Central Queens (70th Road at 150th Street), Yeshiva Ketana (Parsons Boulevard & 78th Road) and Solomon Schechter School of Queens (76-26 Parsons Blvd.)

=== Public libraries ===
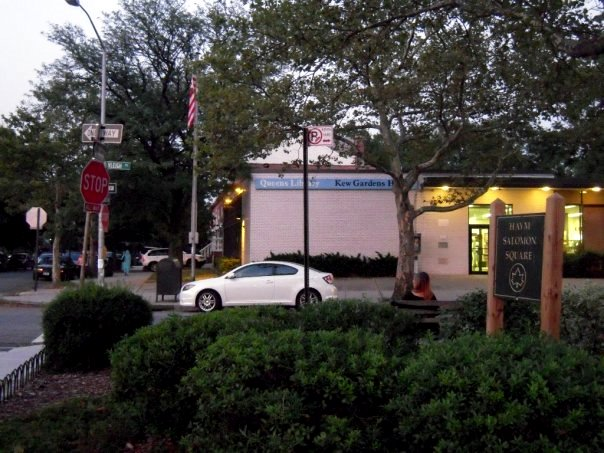
The Kew Gardens Hills Library Branch of Queens Public Library before…

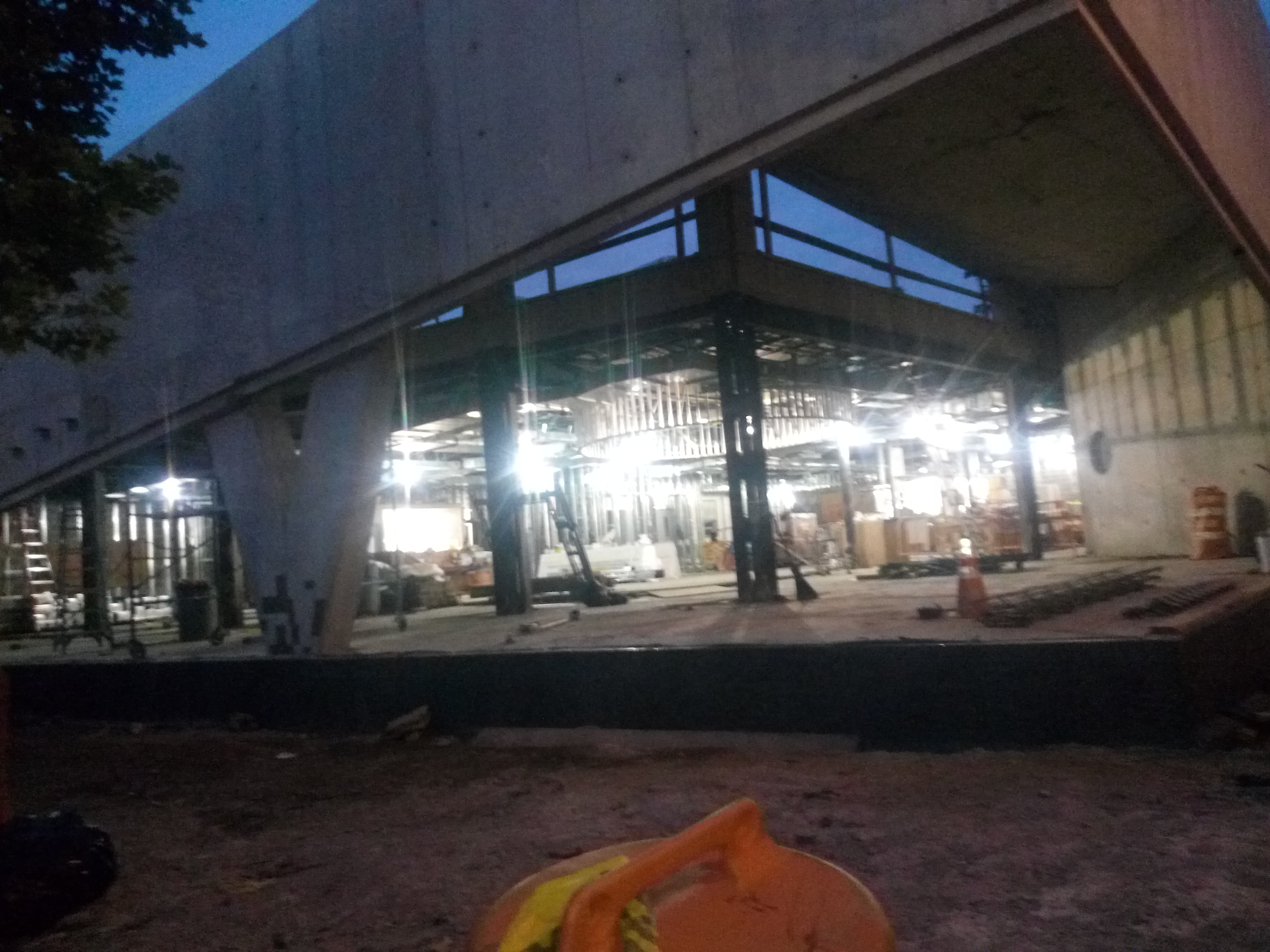
…under construction…

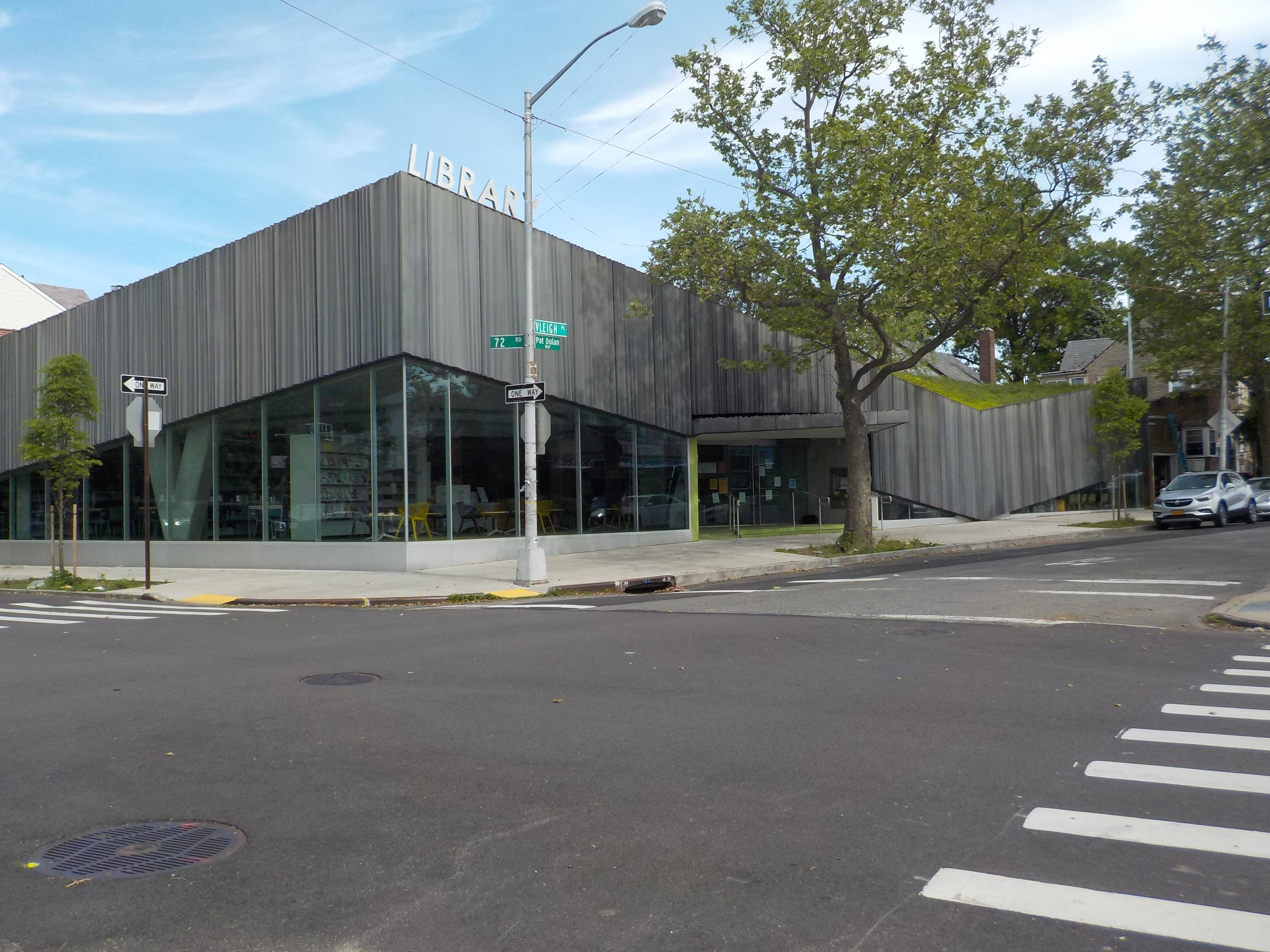
…and after.

Queens Public Library operates the Kew Gardens Hills Branch at 72-33 Vleigh Place. From 1954 until 1998 this library was called the Vleigh Branch. In 2012, the section of Vleigh Place between 72nd Drive and 72nd Road, the block of the library building, was renamed Pat Dolan Way. Dolan was the president of the Kew Gardens Hills Homeowners Association until she was killed in a 2011 car crash. She was instrumental in securing funding for expansion of the library. A 3,000-square-foot (280 m^{2}) expansion of the Kew Gardens Hills branch began in March 2013 and the library reopened on September 6, 2017. A temporary library had been opened nearby at 71-34 Main Street during this time period. The new one has been finished and has been in regular use since, except for a temporary closure due to COVID-19.

Queens Public Library also operates the nearby Pomonok Branch at 158-21 Jewel Avenue, east of Parsons Boulevard.

The Benjamin S. Rosenthal Library, on the Queens College campus, is a depository of U.S. government publications. The library is open to the general public for consultation and on-site use of these collections.

== Commerce ==
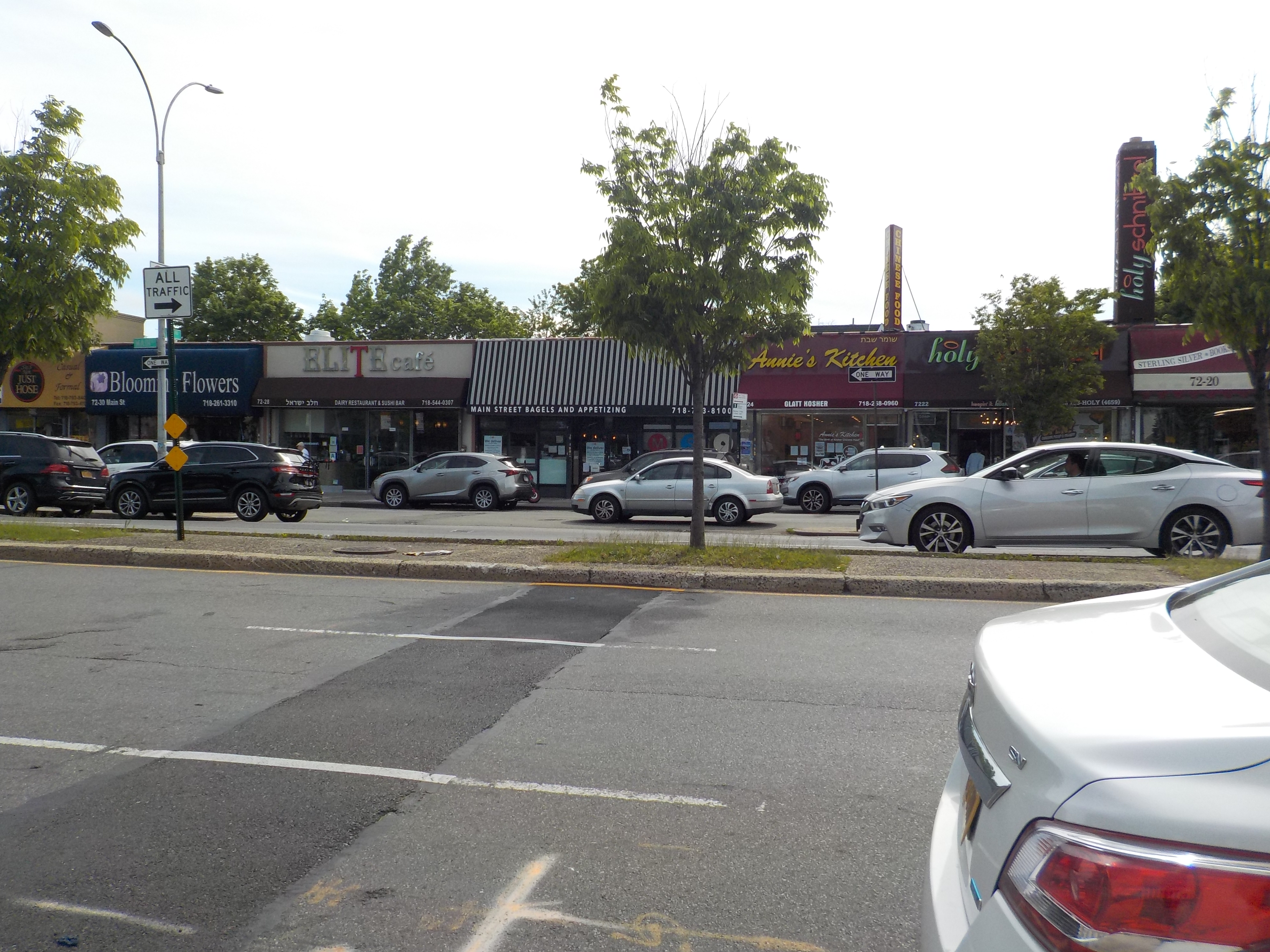
Stores and restaurants on Main Street

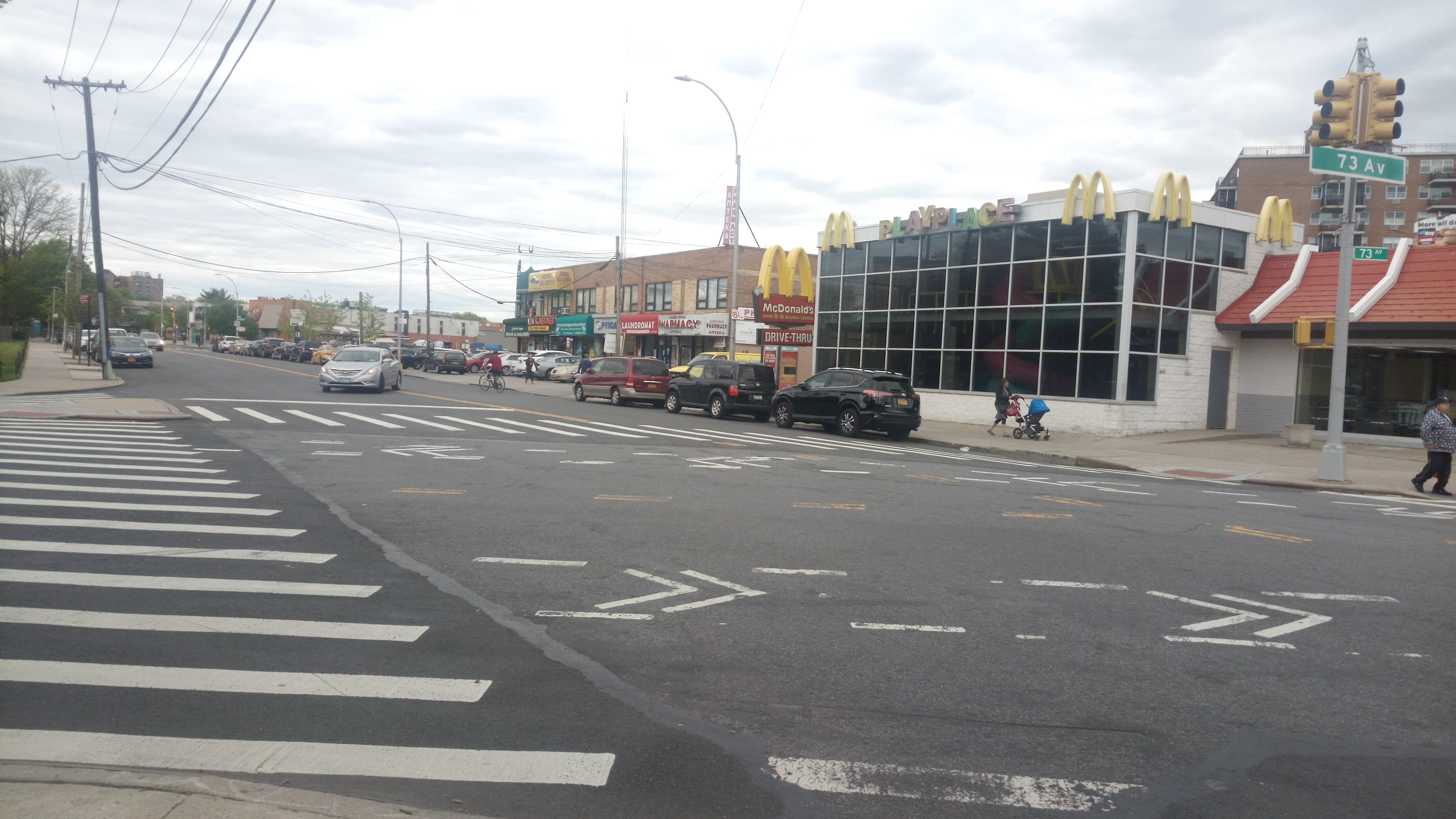
Shops on Kissena Boulevard

The commercial areas of the neighborhood include Main Street, Union Turnpike, Parsons Boulevard, and Kissena Boulevard. Main Street, in particular, is home to many Jewish-themed stores and Kosher restaurants. Many of the businesses along Main Street in Kew Gardens Hills close for Shabbat due to the area's large Jewish population. Many businesses along Kissena Boulevard, on the other hand, have closed permanently due to an economic downturn.

== Police and crime ==
Kew Gardens Hills is patrolled by the 107th Precinct of the NYPD, located at 71-01 Parsons Boulevard. The 107th Precinct ranked 11th safest out of 69 patrol areas for per-capita crime in 2010. The low crime rate was attributed primarily to the area's isolation and to local neighborhood patrols. As of 2018, with a non-fatal assault rate of 22 per 100,000 people, Kew Gardens Hills' rate of violent crimes per capita is lower than that of the city as a whole. The incarceration rate of 191 per 100,000 people is lower than that of the city as a whole.

The 107th Precinct has a lower crime rate than in the 1990s, with crimes across all categories having decreased by 88.8% between 1990 and 2018. The precinct reported 5 murders, 23 rapes, 138 robberies, 131 felony assaults, 149 burglaries, 539 grand larcenies, and 101 grand larcenies auto in 2018.

== Fire safety ==
Kew Gardens Hills is served by the New York City Fire Department (FDNY)'s Engine Co. 315/Ladder Co. 125, located at 159-06 Union Turnpike.

== Health ==
As of 2018, preterm births and births to teenage mothers are less common in Kew Gardens Hills than in other places citywide. In Kew Gardens Hills, there were 74 preterm births per 1,000 live births (compared to 87 per 1,000 citywide), and 6.7 births to teenage mothers per 1,000 live births (compared to 19.3 per 1,000 citywide). Kew Gardens Hills has a relatively average population of residents who are uninsured. In 2018, this population of uninsured residents was estimated to be 11%, which is slightly lower than the citywide rate of 12%.

The concentration of fine particulate matter, the deadliest type of air pollutant, in Kew Gardens Hills is 0.0078 milligrams per cubic metre (7.8×10^{−9} oz/ft^{3}), lower than the citywide and boroughwide averages. Fourteen percent of Kew Gardens Hills residents are smokers, which is equal to the city average of 14% of residents being smokers. In Kew Gardens Hills, 19% of residents are obese, 11% are diabetic, and 29% have high blood pressure—compared to the citywide averages of 20%, 14%, and 24% respectively. In addition, 18% of children are obese, compared to the citywide average of 20%.

Eighty-nine percent of residents eat some fruits and vegetables every day, which is higher than the city's average of 87%. In 2018, 79% of residents described their health as "good", "very good", or "excellent", about the same as the city's average of 78%. For every supermarket in Kew Gardens Hills, there are 5 bodegas.

The nearest large hospitals to Kew Gardens Hills are the Queens Hospital Center in Jamaica and NewYork–Presbyterian/Queens in Flushing.

== Politics ==
Except for an area west of Main Street and north of the cemetery which is located within the boundaries of Queens Community Board 7, the remaining areas of Kew Gardens Hills are within Queens Community Board 8. The entire area of Kew Gardens Hills is part of New York City Council District 24, represented by Jim Gennaro.

Several civic or homeowners associations lobby on behalf of residents of the area. These associations include the Kew Gardens Hills Homeowners Civic Association, the Flushing on the Hill Taxpayers Association, Cedar Grove Civic Homeowners Association, Flushing Suburban Civic Association, Georgetown Mews, and Parkway Village Historical Society.

Kew Gardens Hills is split among three districts in the New York State Assembly. These districts are 24: Assemblymember David Weprin; 25: Assemblymember Nily Rozic; and 27: Assemblymember Sam Berger. Kew Gardens Hills is also split among three districts in the New York State Senate. These districts are 16: Senator John Liu; 14: Senator Leroy Comrie; and 15: Senator Joseph Addabbo Jr. Finally, Kew Gardens Hills is split among two congressional districts in the United States Congress. These districts are New York's 5th congressional district and New York's 6th congressional district. Represented by Gregory Meeks and Grace Meng respectively.

== Transportation ==
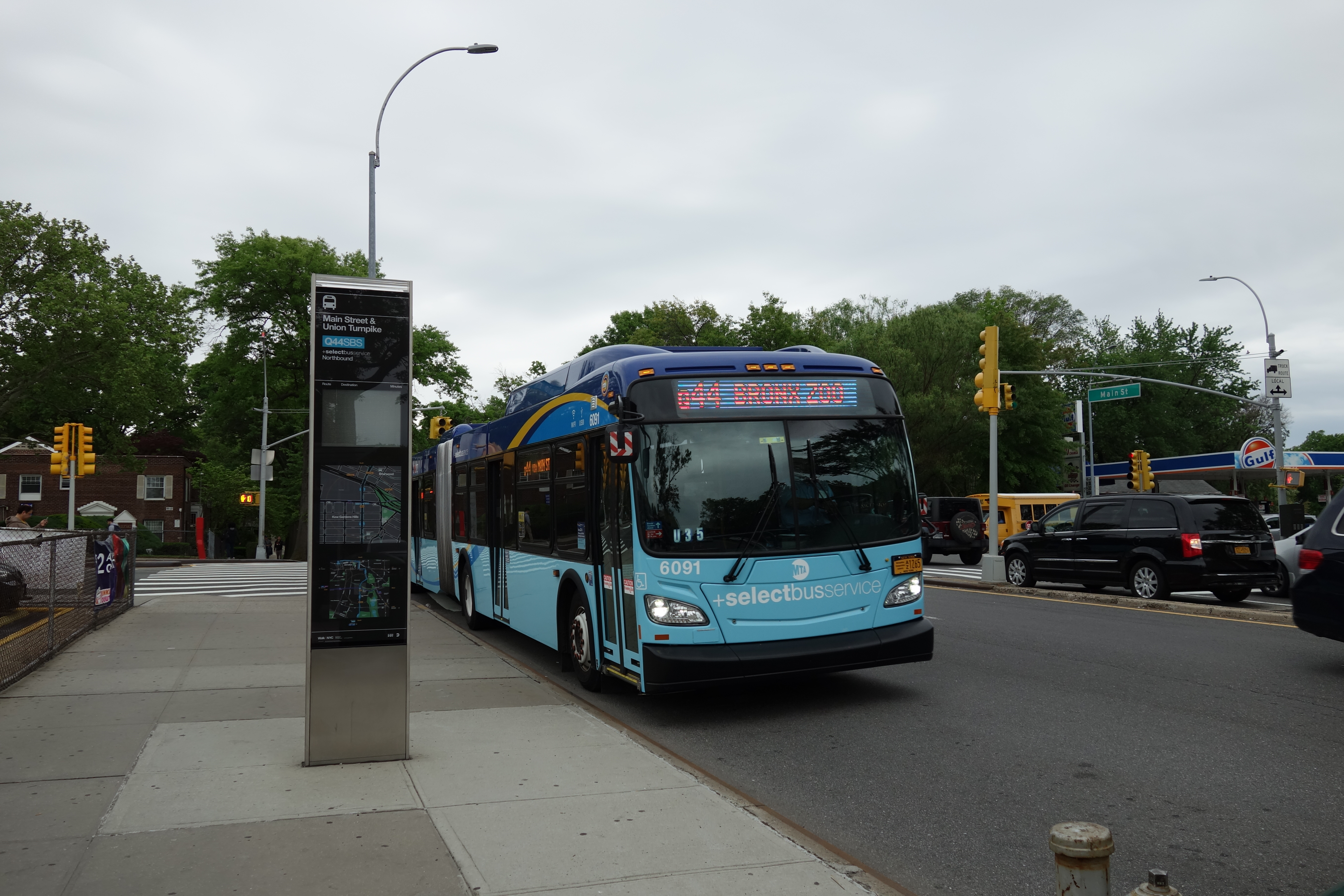
Q44 SBS bus heading toward the Bronx through Kew Gardens Hills.

Main north-south arteries through and around the perimeter of the neighborhood are Main Street, Kissena Boulevard, 164th Street, and Parsons Boulevard. East-west arteries are Jewel Avenue, Union Turnpike, and the Horace Harding Expressway. Highways to and around the neighborhood include the Grand Central Parkway, Van Wyck Expressway, and the Jackie Robinson Parkway (Interboro Parkway), which all intersect at the Kew Gardens Interchange.

Local New York City Bus routes are the Q17, Q20, Q44 SBS, Q45, Q46, Q48 and Q88. The Q74 bus used to serve the neighborhood nearly exclusively until 2010. MTA Bus routes are the Q25, Q64, Q65 and Q74. All express buses from Kew Gardens Hills to Manhattan are also operated under MTA Bus Company. Express routes include the QM1, QM4, QM5, QM6, QM7, QM8, QM31, QM35 and QM44. However, no New York City Subway stations serve the neighborhood directly, instead being accessible by local bus.

Residents were formerly able to access Kew Gardens–Union Turnpike station by foot via the Pat Dolan trail through Flushing Meadows-Corona Park. However, as the 78th Avenue park entrance has been shuttered since 2001, and this portion of the trail neglected by the New York City Department of Parks and Recreation, this is not presently possible.

=== Co-named streets ===
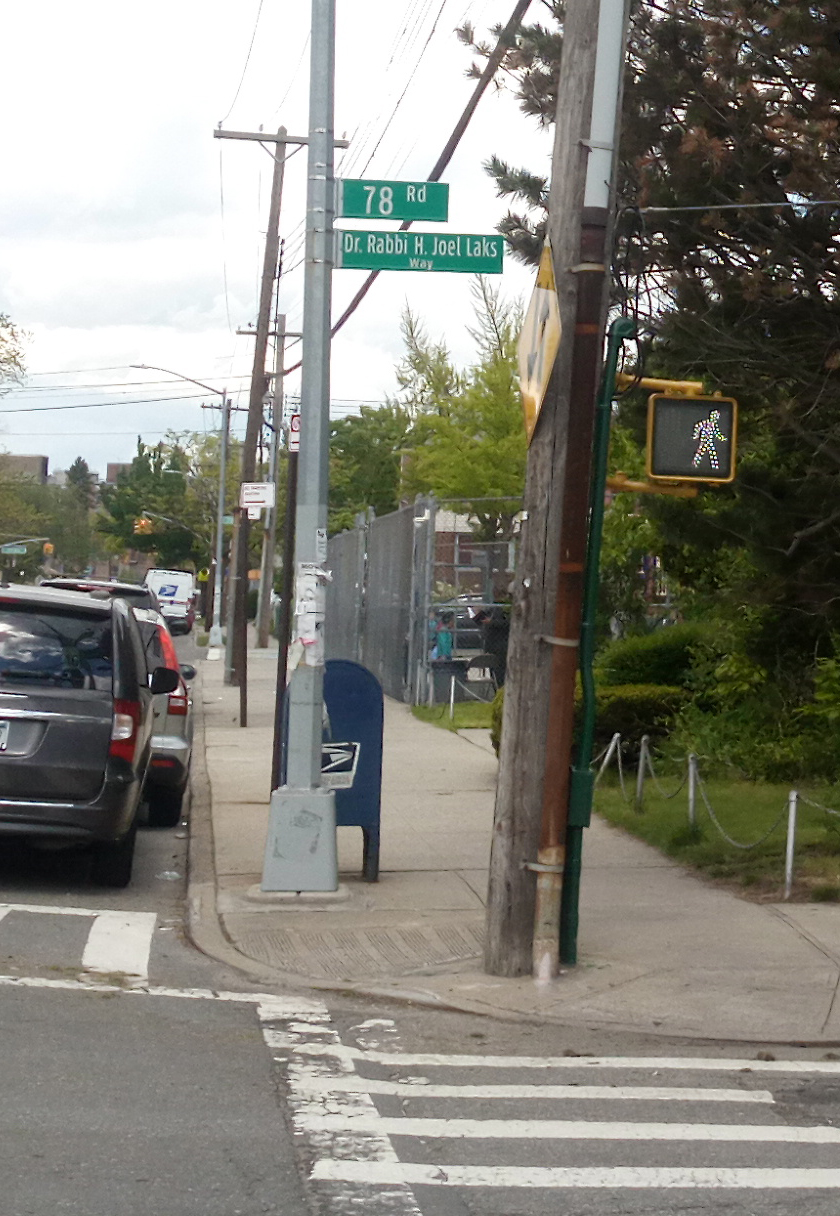
Dr. Rabbi H. Joel Laks Way, at the corner of the street his synagogue was on

Because of the large Jewish population in Kew Gardens Hills, six streets in the neighborhood were named or co-named after notable Jews:

- Freedom Square, named in honor of Theodor Herzl's quest for a Jewish homeland
- Rabbi Kirshblum Triangle, named for the first Rabbi of the Kew Gardens Hills Jewish Center
- Dr. Rabbi H. Joel Laks Way on 78th Road between Parsons Boulevard and 160 Street, named for the founder of the first orthodox synagogue in the area
- Rabbi Avraham Schechter Way, named for a prominent resident of the community is located between 147th Street and 150th Street along 72nd Drive
- Haym Salomon Square (geometrically a triangle), across from the Kew Gardens Hills branch of the Queens Borough Public Library, named for the Revolutionary War financier
- Abe Wolfson Triangle, named for an environmental activist and one of the founders of the Queens Historical Society, is located along Kissena Boulevard near 75th Avenue.

Other streets named or co-named for non-Jews include:

- Harry Van Arsdale Jr. Avenue is the co-name for Jewel Avenue, after the labor leader whose union built Electchester.
- Pat Dolan Way, a block of Vleigh Place facing the Kew Gardens Hills Library. It is named after Pat Dolan, a longtime president of the Kew Gardens Hills Civic Association who was killed in 2011 in a car accident.
- Pat Dolan Trail: A park trail cut into the marsh in Flushing Meadows Corona Park on the south side of Willow Lake. The trail extends from Mauro Playground in Kew Gardens Hills to the Grand Central Parkway Service road in Forest Hills.

== Structures ==
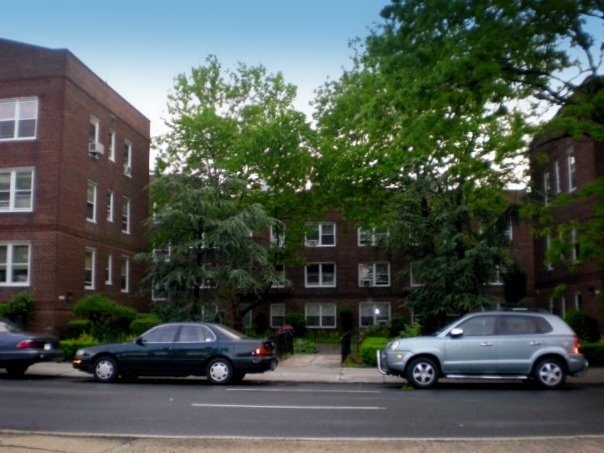
Regency Gardens, one of many Kew Gardens Hills garden apartments

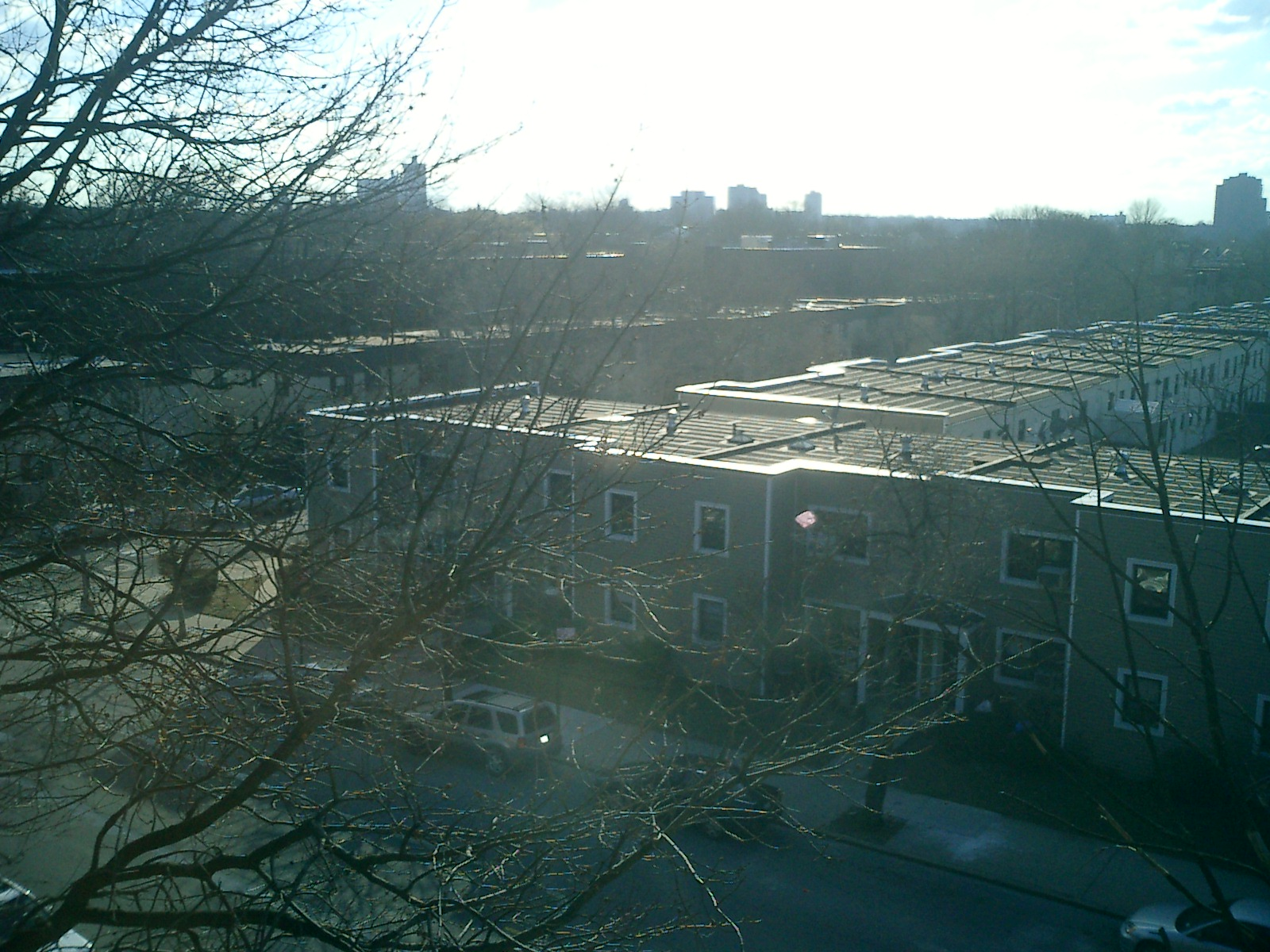
The intersection of 71st Avenue and 150th Street in eastern Kew Gardens Hills

Kew Gardens Hills is a mixed neighborhood of single-family homes – detached or in rows – as well as three to six-story garden apartment buildings mostly built during the years immediately following World War II, such as Regency Gardens. These apartments are characterized by their lawns and internal pathways that give the complexes a small-neighborhood feel. There are several homes in Kew Gardens Hills that predate Main Street, whose property was subject to eminent domain in the 1930s to widen 144th Street into the Main Street extension from northern Flushing. A few public housing projects in one part of the neighborhood were also built. Other buildings in that area were built to house employees of certain unions, including the Electchester Co-operative Building, built for electrical employees in 1949 on what used to be the grounds of the Pomonok Country Club, which no longer houses electrical employees exclusively.

=== Buildings ===
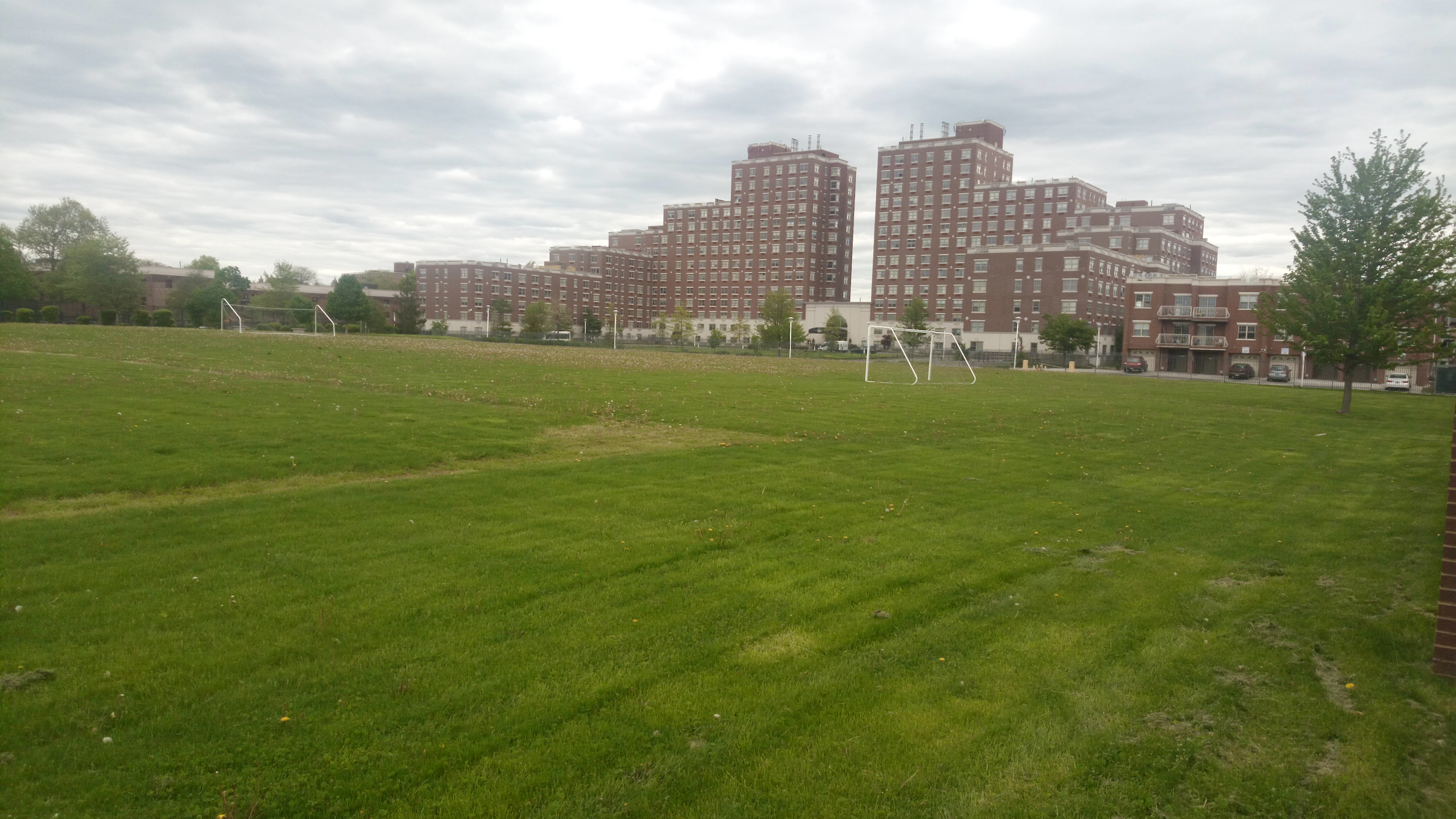
Opal Luxury Apartments

- The Godwin-Ternbach Museum is located on the grounds of Queens College. Founded in 1981 by art historian Frances Godwin and noted art restorer Joseph Ternbach, the Museum's mission has grown with the changing times from a teaching museum for the benefit of art students to a public museum that reaches out beyond the college campus.
- Selma and Max Kupferberg Center for the Visual and Performing Arts is a concert hall located on the campus of Queens College, and provides an accessible and affordable facility to enrich the cultural environment of the region with classical and pop performances for general audiences.
- The Queens County Savings Bank building, constructed in 1954, is modeled after Philadelphia's Independence Hall. The building also has a full-size replica of the Liberty Bell. In 2005, the building was placed on the National Park Service, U.S. Department of Interior's National Register of Historic Places.
- Parkway Village, designed by Leonard Schultze and Associates, between Parsons Boulevard, Union Turnpike, and Grand Central Parkway, was built to house United Nations employees in the late 1940s. Some owners are seeking landmark historic status for the co-op. Parkway Village was developed as a rental community with 685 units on 37 acres (150,000 m^{2}) of rolling parkland in 1947. Today the buildings are in need of maintenance and upgrading, and the vegetation needs some management.
- The Opal, a mid-rise luxury building built on the site of long-time vacant lots, opened in Kew Gardens Hills in November 2004; along with Lander College, it was built on marshland that is the source for Kissena Creek.
- Six Spanish-style buildings built about 1908 for the New York Parental School are still in use on the Queens College campus today. These buildings are the G Building, originally the infirmary for the NY Parental School; Colwin Hall; Delaney Hall; Frese Hall; the J Building, and Jefferson Hall, the administration building. The architecture of Jefferson Hall has earned it the description of turn of the [20th] century Central American capitol.
- Adereth Eliyahu Congregation, built in 1983 and bisecting 147th Street, was awarded the Excellence in Design and Civic Value by the Queens Chamber of Commerce.

=== Cemeteries ===
- Cedar Grove Cemetery. The entrance for automobiles is located at the intersection of Van Wyck Expressway and Horace Harding Expressway. A pedestrian entrance is located on Main Street near Gravett Road. Cedar Grove Cemetery was founded in 1894 as a non-sectarian cemetery. A major part of the cemetery was later to become the Mount Hebron Cemetery.
- Mount Hebron Cemetery uses the same roads as Cedar Grove cemetery but since 1909 has operated independently as a Jewish cemetery. As of 2012, over 217,000 burials have taken place at Mount Hebron.
- The Willett Family Burial Ground is located just inside the main gate to Mount Hebron Cemetery. Here, members of the Willet and Colden families, former owners of the property, are said to have been laid to rest. The stone of Elizabeth Willet, dated October 19, 1773 is still standing. Another stone dated 1722 is partially covered but visible.
- Colored Cemetery, also known as the Troytown Cemetery, was a private cemetery in the estate of Troy Rantus, and was located on Cravett Place, which today is 149th Street between Melbourne Avenue and Gravett Road. Wilson Rantus, writer, educator, and editor known as "The Anglo African", was an abolitionist instrumental in establishing a weekly black newspaper and a school for black children in Jamaica was buried in this cemetery. This private family cemetery was established in 1853, but the land was sold by Troy's descendants in 1915. In 1952, the bodies were removed to Evergreens Cemetery in Brooklyn. An 1861 gravestone attributed to abolitionist Wilson Rantus was found in a backyard on the site of the cemetery in June 2014.

=== Parks and playgrounds ===
The New York City Department of Parks and Recreation maintains several playgrounds and parks in the Kew Gardens Hills area:

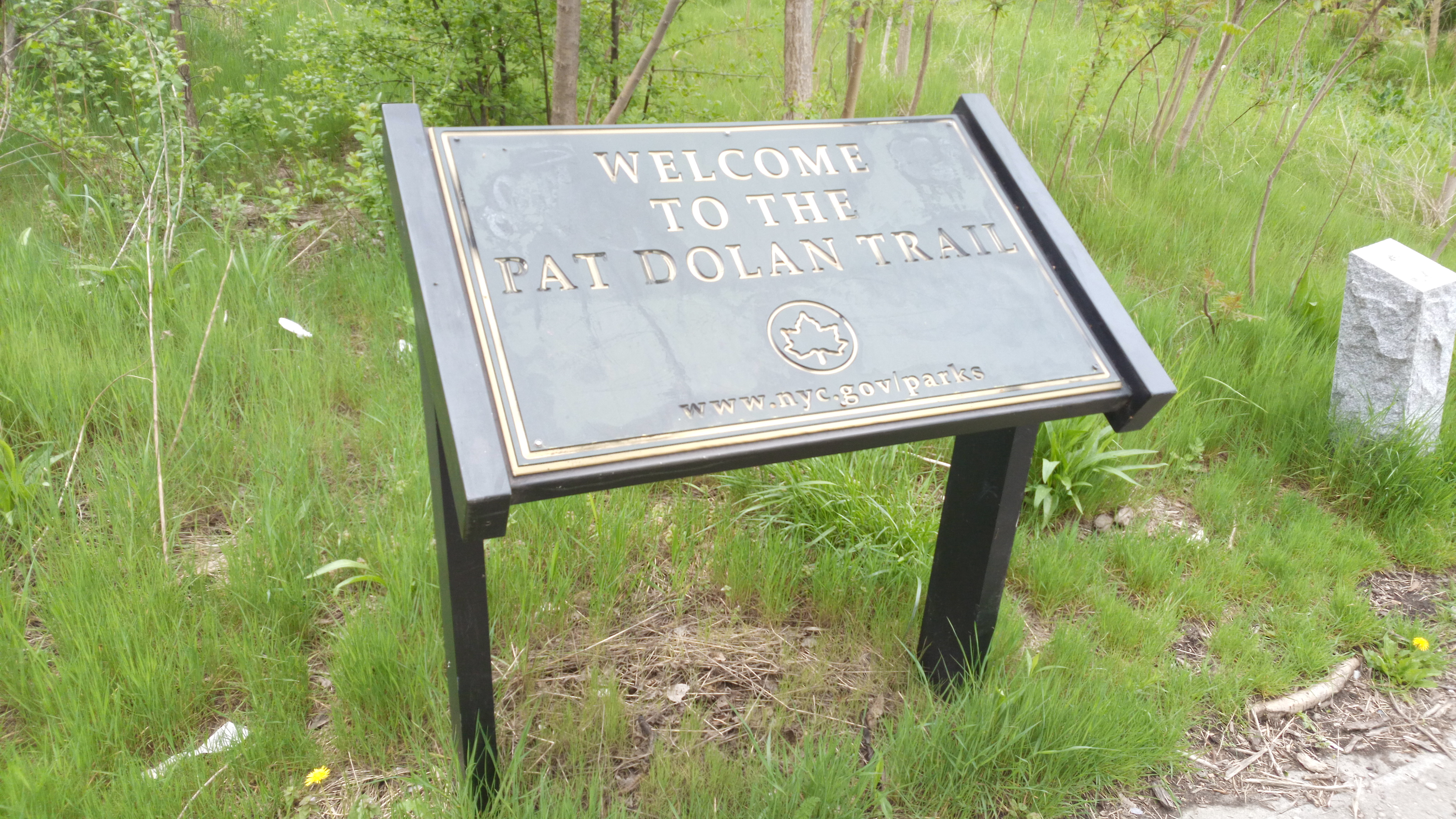
East end trail marker for the Pat Dolan Trail located at the end of the bridge from the Mauro Playground

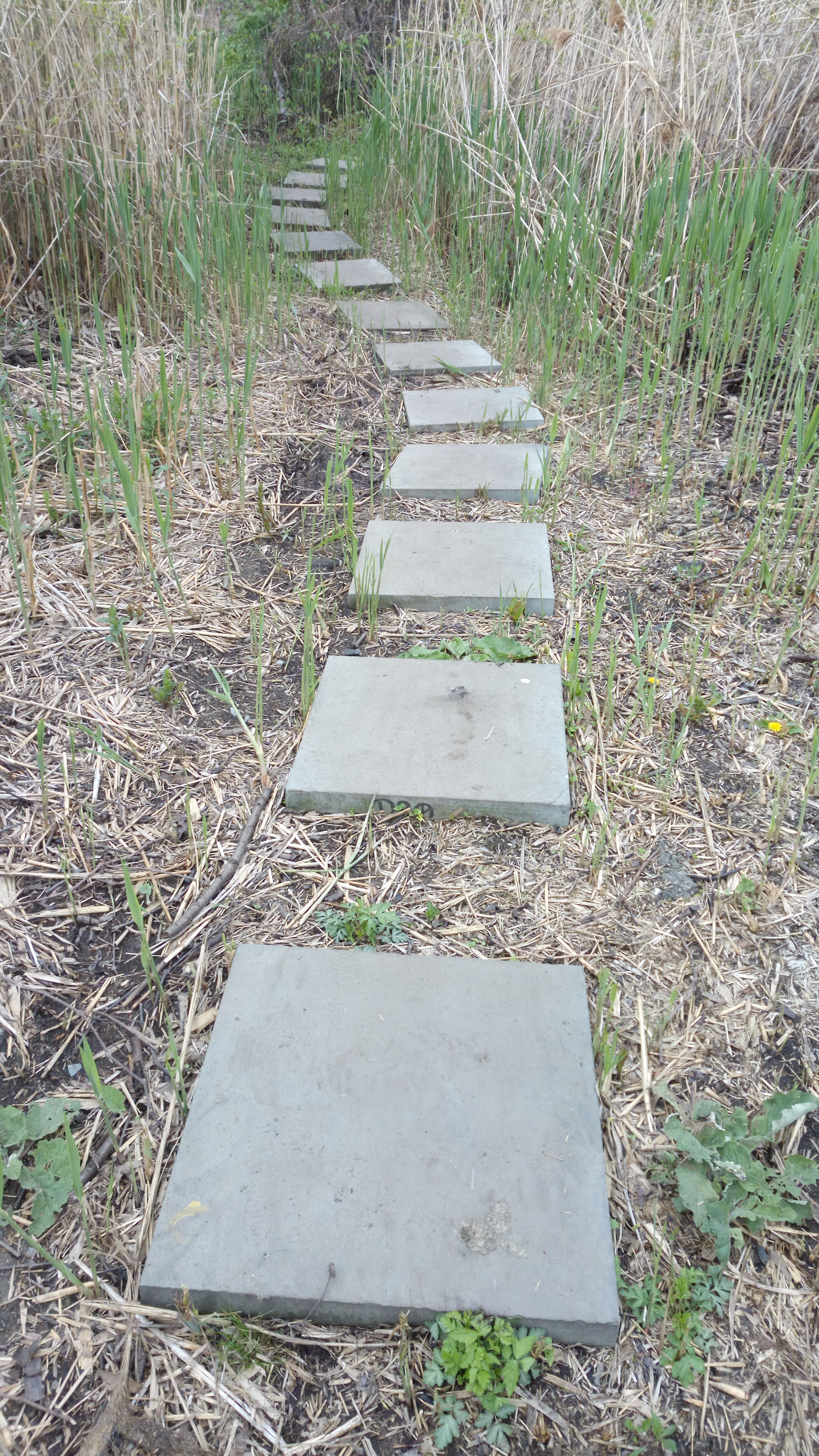
Part of the Pat Dolan Trail

- Cedar Grove Playground. Located on Main Street at Gravett Road. The playground is next to JHS219.
- Electric Playground. Located along 164th Street in the Electchester development.
- Emerald Playground. Located on 164th Street off Jewel Avenue.
- Flushing Meadows–Corona Park. The southern pedestrian and bicycle entrance to the Park is located on Jewel Avenue just south of Park Drive East. The Albert Mauro Playground near Willow Lake is accessible from Park Drive East near 73rd Terrace. An overpass over the Van Wyck Expressway connects the playground to Willow Lake. In Spring 2013, the NYC Parks Department renamed the trail around Willow Lake, the Pat Dolan Trail. The trail is open to the public during daylight hours.
- Freedom Square Playground. Located on Freedom Square at the intersection of Vleigh Place and Main Street.
- Judge Moses Weinstein Playground. The playground is located on Vleigh Place, north of Union Turnpike.
- Playground 75. Located on 160th Street at 75th Road.
- Pomonok Playground. Located on Kissena Boulevard at 65th Avenue, across the street from Queens College.
- Queens Valley Playground. Located on 137th Street at 76th Road. The playground is behind PS 164.
- Vleigh Playground. Located on 70th Road east of 150th Street, behind PS 165. The playground is located along the route of what was the Vleigh Road.

== In popular culture ==
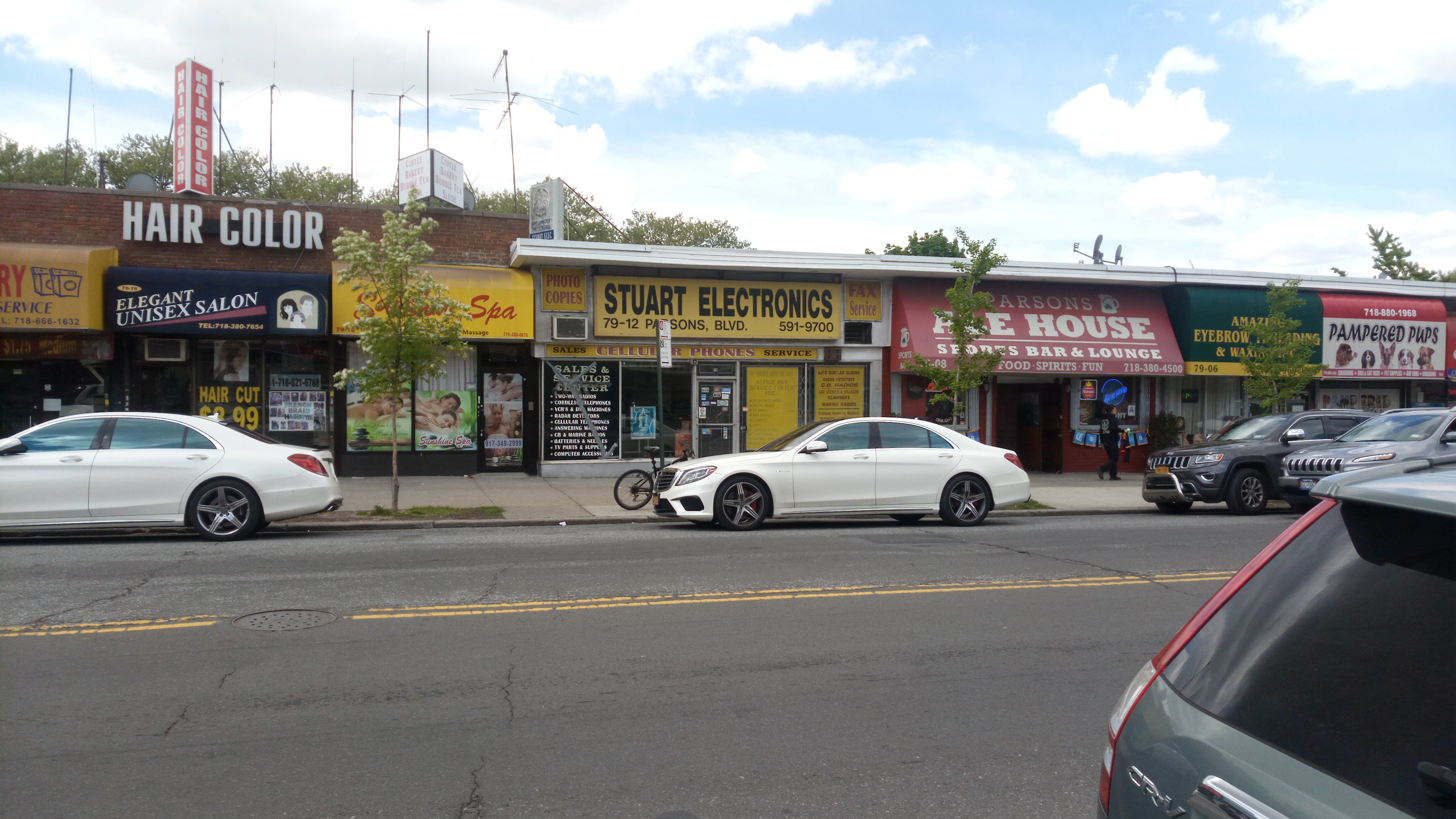
Stuart Electronics on Parsons Boulevard

- The storefront of Stuart Electronics on Parsons Boulevard was featured in Season 14 Episode 14 of Law & Order. The real life owner of the store is Peter Guggenheim, father of Law & Order writer Mark Guggenheim.
- Scenes from the 2000 movie Boiler Room were shot in Kew Gardens Hills. Kew Gardens Hills was referenced in the movie as well.
- Kew Gardens Hills is home to Max and Mina's Ice Cream, named number 1 of the top 10 unique Ice Cream Parlors in America in Everybody Loves Ice Cream, the Whole Scoop on America's favorite treat by Shannos Jackson Arnold, Emmis Books, July 2004. Some Manhattan restaurants offer Max & Mina's Ice Cream on their dessert menus.
- The Trivial Pursuit 20th Anniversary Edition featured the question "What kosher product is served in flavors like lox, corn on the cob, and horseradish, at Max & Mina's in Flushing, New York?"
- The 1939 PGA Championship was played at the Pomonok Country Club, now the site of the Pomonok and Electchester housing in the northern section of Kew Gardens Hills. Henry Picard won the championship that year.
- Slackwire Sam Johnson's quarter-final act of Season 8 on America's Got Talent was filmed at Queens College during summer 2013.
- Scenes from Still Alice were filmed at Campbell Dome in Queens College.
- Scenes from HBO's The Leftovers were filmed at Queens Hall.
- Scenes from Saturday Night Live's skit Bern Your Enthusiasm, starring Larry David as Democrat Presidential Candidate Bernie Sanders, were filmed in front of Jefferson Hall and the Queens College Student Union buildings. The episode aired on NBC on February 6, 2015.
- In the 1985 martial arts / fantasy film The Last Dragon, scheming record producer Eddie Arcadian and his girlfriend Angela are both from Kew Gardens.

== Notable residents ==
Notable residents past and present of Kew Gardens Hills include:

- Aaron Alexis (1979–2013), gunman in the 2013 Washington Navy Yard shooting, lived on 77th Road.
- Ellen Barkin (born 1954), actress, grew up in Kew Gardens Hills.
- Ralph Bunche (1903–1971), Nobel Peace Prize Laureate 1950, lived in Parkway Village.
- Robert Chartoff (1933–2015), film producer, grew up in the neighborhood.
- Cadwallader Colden (1688–1776), Lieutenant Governor for the province of New York, maintained his summer residence at Spring Hill
- Cadwallader David Colden (1769–1834), Politician. Mayor of New York from 1818 to 1821 was born in Spring Hill Farm
- Fran Drescher (born 1957), actress, from The Nanny. She lived at 147-49 72nd Avenue, Ambassador Gardens, and then at 150-58 71st Avenue, and worked at the Main Street movie theater as a teenager.
- Bob Dylan (born 1941), musician, once lived in the neighborhood, near Queens College.
- Gilbert Eisner (born c. 1940), former fencer, who won the épée title at the 1962 U.S. Fencing Championships
- Betty Friedan (1921–2006), activist, feminist and writer, lived in Parkway Village in the early 1950s.
- Ashrita Furman (born 1954), set more than 160 official Guinness records.
- Art Garfunkel (born 1941), musician, lived at 136-58 72nd Avenue.
- Lenny Hambro (1923–1995), jazz musician, lived on 77th Road.
- Fiorello La Guardia (1882–1947), former congressman and mayor of New York City maintained a summer residence in the area.
- Martin Landau (1928–2017), actor, grew up in Kew Gardens Hills.
- Michael Landon (1936–1991), actor, grew up in Kew Gardens Hills.
- Rose Meth (1925–2013), surviving participant in the October 7, 1944 "Sonderkommando uprising"
- Mark Olf (1905–1987), Jewish folksinger and recording artist, lived in Kew Gardens Hills.
- Daniel Rosenthal (born 1991), politician who has since 2017 represented the 27th District in the New York State Assembly and was the Assembly's youngest member when he took office.
- Michael Simanowitz (1971–2017), New York State Assembly Member, lived in the Electchester development.
- Paul Simon (born 1941), singer, songwriter and musician, lived at 137-62 70th Road
- Paul Stanley (born 1952), lead singer of KISS, lived on 75th Road near Main Street
- Kalman Topp (born 1972), rabbi, educator and author, lived on 72nd Crescent.
- Leroy Watson, rapper, makes his home in Kew Gardens Hills.
- Moses M. Weinstein (1912–2007), lawyer and politician, who has a playground named for him.
- Roy Wilkins (1901–1981), civil rights leader who headed the NAACP. He lived at 147-15 Village Road in Parkway Village. A major park in south Queens now bears his name.

== Photo Gallery ==
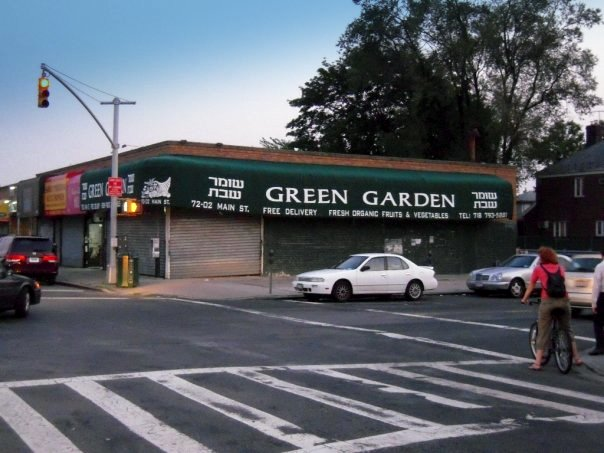
A fruit and vegetable store on Main Street in Kew Gardens Hills, 2008. This particular store has since closed down.

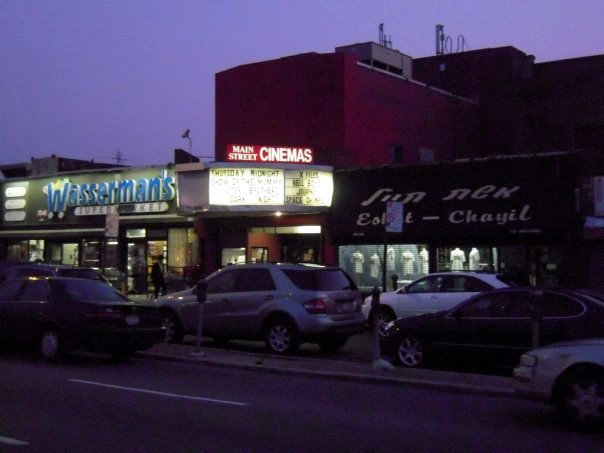
Shops on Main Street in an outdated photo--Wasserman's has since moved across the street, the Movie Theater has closed, and Eshet Chayil has a new awning
