= Gilbert Eisner =

American fencer

Personal information
- Home town: Kew Gardens Hills, Queens, New York

Fencing career
- Sport: Fencing
- Country: United States
- Weapon: épée
- Club: New York University

Gilbert Eisner is an American former épée fencer.

Eisner is Jewish, and was a commercial artist.

== Fencing career ==
A resident of Kew Gardens Hills, Queens, New York, he fenced for Forest Hills High School in Queens, New York. In 1960, he won the NCAA épée championship while fencing for New York University. He was undefeated in épée in three years at NYU, and graduated in 1961.

He won the épée title at the 1962 U.S. Fencing Championships in New York. In 1963, he won a gold medal in team épée for the United States at the 1963 Pan American Games.

He is a member of the NYU Athletics Hall of Fame, having been inducted in 1987.

== See also ==
- List of USFA Division I National Champions
- List of NCAA fencing champions
