= Kalman Topp =

American rabbi, educator and author (born 1972)

Rabbi Kalman Topp

Personal life
- Born: 14 December 1972 (age 53) New York City, U.S.
- Spouse: Dr. Jordana Topp
- Children: 6
- Education: Yeshivat Har Etzion; Yeshiva University

Religious life
- Religion: Judaism
- Denomination: Orthodox

Jewish leader
- Predecessor: Rabbi Steven Weil
- Position: Senior Rabbi
- Organisation: Beth Jacob Congregation
- Began: August 2009
- Residence: Los Angeles, California
- Semikhah: Rabbi Isaac Elchanan Theological Seminary

Rabbi Kalman Topp (born 14 December 1972) is an American Modern-Orthodox rabbi, educator and author, currently serving as the Senior Rabbi of the Beth Jacob Congregation of Beverly Hills, California.

== Early life ==
A native New Yorker, Topp was raised in Kew Gardens Hills, Queens, where he attended and graduated from Yeshiva of Central Queens. Following high school, he attended Yeshivat Har Etzion from 1990-1992. After graduating from the Yeshiva University's Syms School of Business, he attended Rabbi Isaac Elchanan Theological Seminary for his ordination and the Azrieli Graduate School of Jewish Education for a master's degree in secondary education.

== Career ==
Prior to receiving his ordination, Topp worked for Osem Foods International in Petach Tikvah, Israel, in its finance department. After achieving his master's degree, he taught Jewish studies at various schools in New York and New Jersey, including the Frisch School and the Hebrew Academy of the Five Towns and Rockaway.

Before joining Beth Jacob, he served as Rabbi to the Albert Einstein College of Medicine and the Young Israel of Woodmere in Woodmere, New York. In August 2009, he joined Congregation Beth Jacob of Beverly Hills as Senior Rabbi.

In May 2008, Rabbi Topp was appointed by the Nassau County Legislature to serve as a Human Rights Commissioner in Nassau County on a multi-racial commission that investigates human rights complaints, promotes tolerance and fights all types of discrimination in the county

Rabbi Topp has served on a number of committees and boards dealing with issues impacting the Jewish community, including on a subcommittee of the Rabbinical Council of America, where he is on the executive board. Rabbi Topp serves on the National Council of AIPAC, the Executive committee of the Southern California Board of Rabbis, the Executive Committee of the Rabbinical Council of California, Executive Committee of the Rabbinical Council of America, and the Halachic Advisory Board for Aleinu. His writings have appeared in journals and books.

== Personal ==
Rabbi Topp is married to Jordana Topp, a graduate of Stern College and the University of Medicine and Dentistry of New Jersey. Dr. Topp studied at Michlalah-Jerusalem College and Nishmat in Jerusalem. In addition to raising her family, Jordana works as a dentist in private practice. She is the Los Angeles Community Yoetzet Halacha, having been trained in Nishmat’s Yoetzet Halacha Program. They have six children and reside in Los Angeles, California.
