= Queens County Savings Bank =

Historic commercial building in Queens, New York

- U.S. National Register of Historic Places
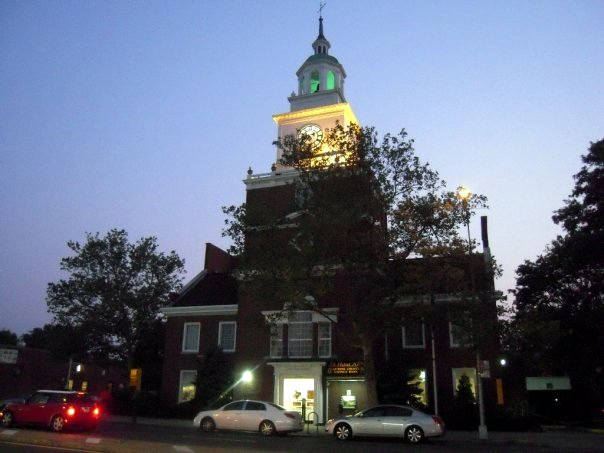
- Queens County Savings Bank, 2008

- Location within New York City Location within New York Location within the United States
- Location: 75-44 Main Street, Kew Gardens Hills, Queens, New York City
- Coordinates: 40°43′21″N 73°49′14″W
- Area: less than one acre
- Built: 1954
- Architect: Carlson, Harold O.
- Architectural style: Georgian Revival
- NRHP reference No.: 05000620
- Added to NRHP: June 16, 2005

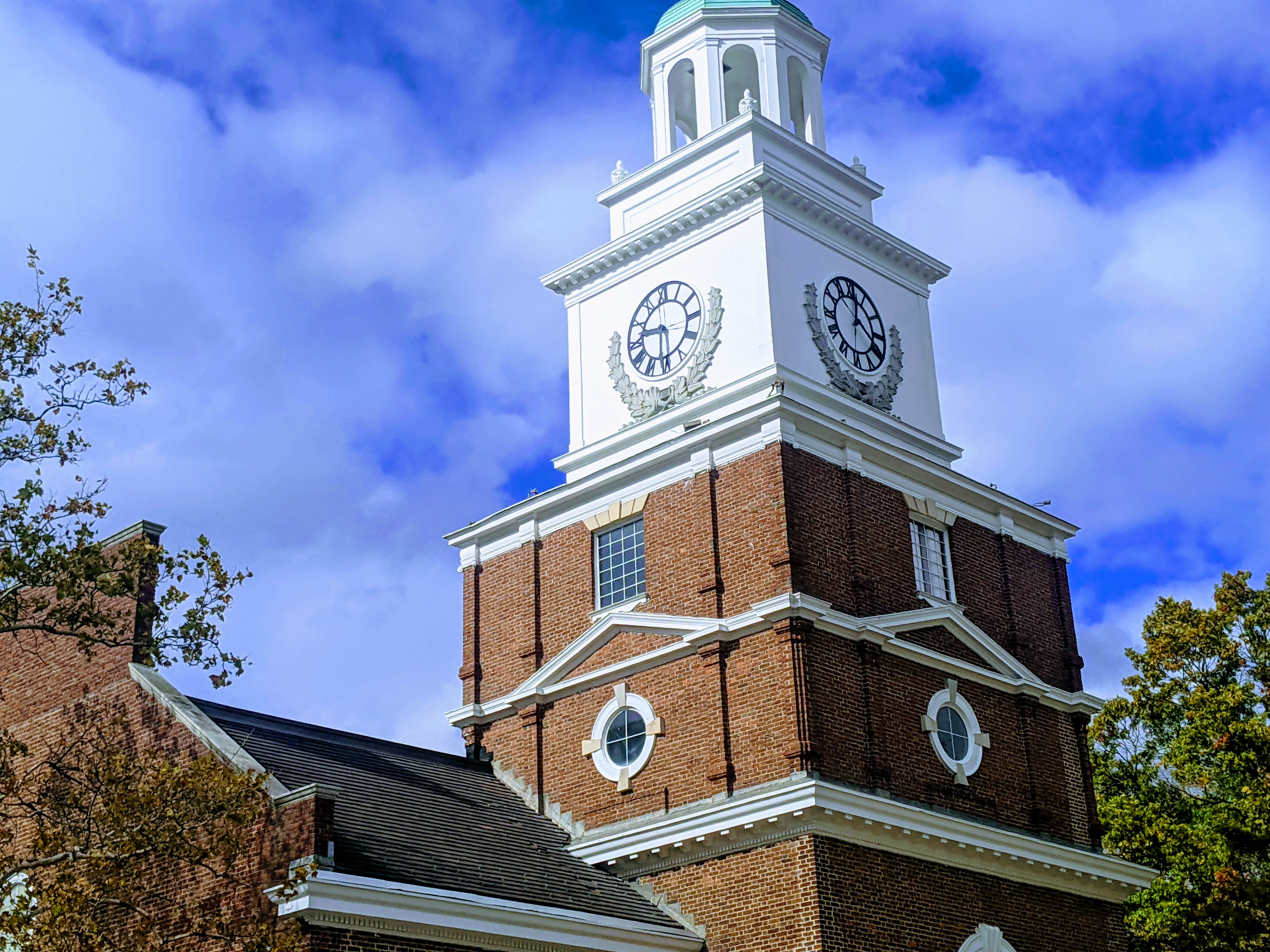
The clock tower of the Queens County Savings Bank building in 2021

Queens County Savings Bank is a historic bank building, which formerly housed the Kew Gardens Hills branch of the Queens Library, at 75-44 Main Street in Kew Gardens Hills, Queens, New York City. It was built in 1953-1954 to resemble Independence Hall in the Georgian Revival style. It is a brick building that consists of a tall central tower with flanking two-story, side-gabled wings.

It is four bays wide and has a six-stage, square tower featuring a second story Palladian window. The tower has an octagonal belfry topped by a smaller cupola and spire.

It was listed on the National Register of Historic Places in 2005.
