= Nettie Mayersohn =

American politician (1924–2020)

Member of the New York State Assembly from the 27th district
- In office January 1, 1983 – April 1, 2011
- Preceded by: David L. Cohen
- Succeeded by: Michael Simanowitz

Personal details
- Born: May 30, 1924 Queens, New York City, New York
- Died: August 13, 2020 (aged 96) Queens, New York City, New York
- Party: Democratic
- Spouse: Ronald Mayersohn (died 2005)
- Children: 2
- Education: Queens College (CUNY)
- Profession: Politician

Nettie Mayersohn (May 30, 1924 – August 13, 2020) was a member of the New York State Assembly, representing the 27th District in Flushing, Queens. Her district extended from Kew Gardens Hills, to Kew Gardens and the northern edge of Richmond Hill.

== Biography ==
She was born on May 30, 1924. She graduated B.A. from Queens College in 1978. She was a resident of the Electchester cooperative housing complex in Flushing, Queens. She was married Ronald Mayersohn until his death in 2005. The couple had two children, including Lee, a judge.

Mayersohn spent 30 years as a community activist, and was Executive Director of the New York State Crime Victims Board. She is a Democrat. She was a member of the New York State Assembly from 1983 to 2011, sitting in the 185th, 186th, 187th, 188th, 189th, 190th, 191st, 192nd, 193rd, 194th, 195th, 196th, 197th, 198th, and 199th New York State Legislatures, where she was a prime sponsor of the Baby AIDS Bill, which requires all newborns to be tested for that disease. The "Black And Latino AIDS Coalition" (BLAC) strongly supported Mayersohn's "Baby AIDS Bill" and the "HIV Surveillance Bill". Dennis Levy, the HIV+ African American President of the community-based "BLAC", was criticized by New York City AIDS advocates for supporting Mayersohn but the two became close friends. She resigned her seat on April 1, 2011, reportedly to spend more time with her grandchildren.

She died on August 13, 2020, in Queens, New York City, New York at age 96.

New York State Assembly
Preceded by David L. Cohen	New York State Assembly; 27th District; 1983–2011	Succeeded by Michael Simanowitz
