= Vleigh Playground =

Public park in Queens, New York

Coordinates: 40.729407°N 73.817060°W

Vleigh Playground is a 2.243-acre (0.908 ha) park in Kew Gardens Hills, Queens, New York City. It takes its name from Head of the Vleigh Road, a colonial period path that ran along the northern boundary of the playground site. This path is presently followed by Vleigh Place and 70th Road. This road connected the town of Flushing to Brooklyn during colonial times, allowing travelers to circumvent Flushing Meadows, then an impassible swamp.

Its name is derived from the Dutch word vlaie (also spelled vlie, meaning "swamp" or "valley") in reference to Flushing Meadows.

Prior to the mid-20th century, much of Kew Gardens Hills was farmland owned by the Campbell, Jackson and Miller families. In the early 20th century, some of the farms were purchased by the Arrowbrook and Pomonok golf clubs that capitalized on the hilly terrain and scenic views.

With the extension of the Independent Subway System's Queens Boulevard line to Kew Gardens–Union Turnpike station in 1936, which promised a 20-minute ride into Manhattan, Kew Gardens Hills became more attractive to developers. Entrepreneur Abraham Wolosoff purchased land in the area hoping to use its hills and rural setting to attract residents. The developer gave the neighborhood its current name, Kew Gardens Hills, after the nearby Kew Gardens neighborhood.

With residential construction increasing following the Second World War, there was demand for a new school in Kew Gardens Hills. Recognizing the quickening loss of open space, the City’s Board of Estimate voted to acquire this remaining undeveloped parcel for a school and playground. The city acquired the land for this playground in 1949 through condemnation. It opened in on January 15, 1952 as the PS 165 Playground.

The adjacent school, PS 165 is co-named after Edith K. Bergtraum (1918–1994) a teacher and member of the New York City Commission on the Status of Women. Her husband Murry Bergtraum. Murry Bergtraum served as president of the New York City Board of Education from 1969 until his death in 1973. The co-naming was sponsored by Rep. Gary Ackerman in 1995.

Surrounded by the apartment complexes of Dara Gardens, Georgetown Mews and Pomonok Houses, the Vleigh Playground offers much needed playing space for the neighborhood’s children.
