= Beth Jacob Congregation (Beverly Hills, California) =

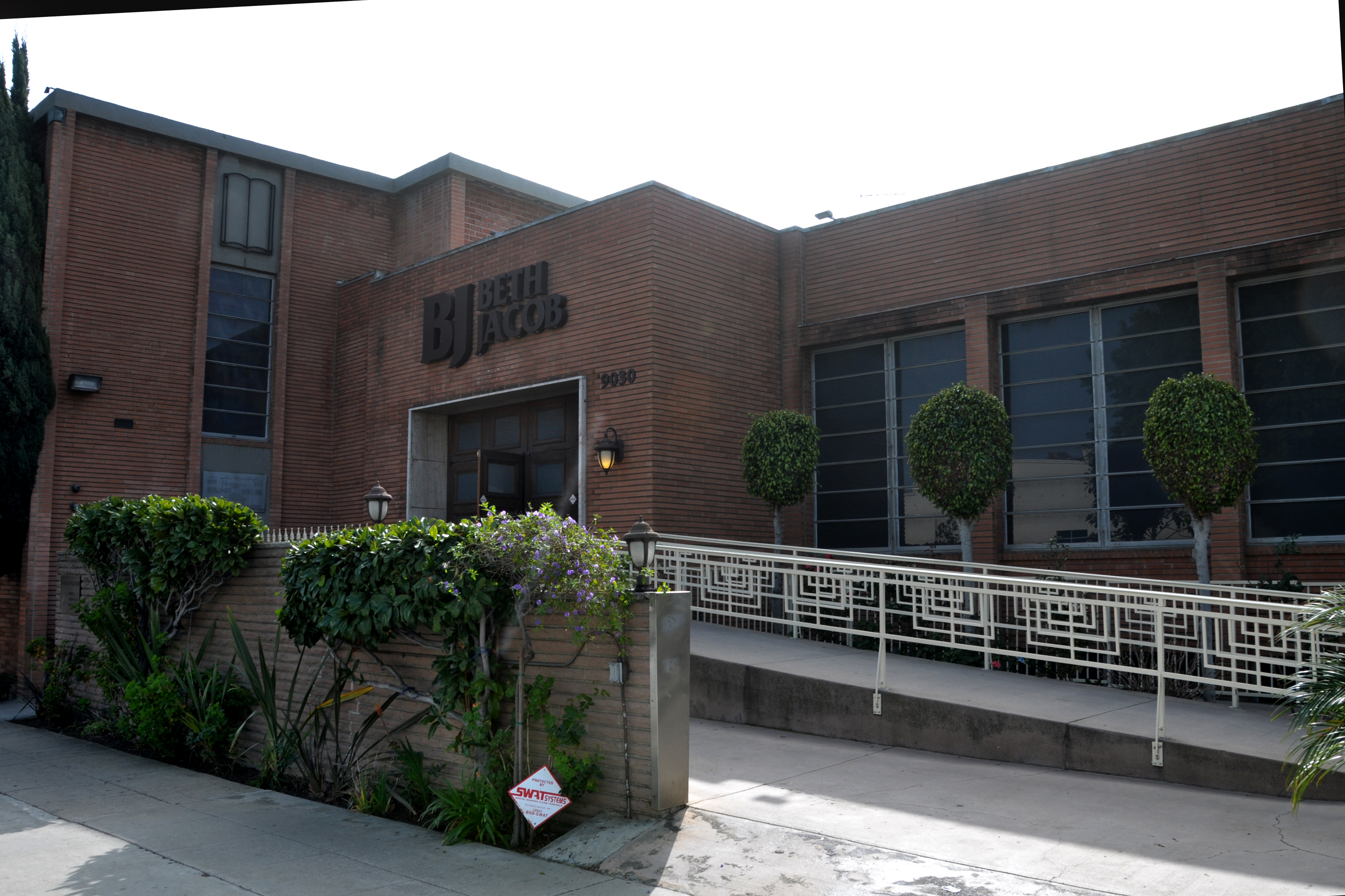
- Beth Jacob Congregation in 2015

- Location in western Los Angeles

Religion
- Affiliation: Orthodox Judaism
- Ecclesiastical or organizational status: Synagogue
- Leadership: Rabbi Kalman Topp; Rabbi Adir Posy (Associate); Rabbi Robbie Tombosky (Assistant); Rabbi Eli Broner (Youth)
- Status: Active

Location
- Location: 9030 West Olympic Boulevard, Beverly Hills, California
- Country: United States
- Interactive map of Beth Jacob Congregation
- Coordinates: 34°3′33″N 118°23′20″W

Architecture
- Established: 1925 (as a congregation)
- Completed: 1954
- Direction of façade: North

Website
- www.bethjacob.org

Beth Jacob Congregation is an Orthodox synagogue, located at 9030 on West Olympic Boulevard in Beverly Hills, California, in the United States. It is the largest Orthodox synagogue in the Western United States.

== History ==
The congregation was started in West Adams, Los Angeles in 1925. It was named West Adams Hebrew Congregation, and it was located at the corner of West Adams Street and Hillcrest Drive.

In 1954, the synagogue was relocated to Olympic Boulevard in Beverly Hills. At the same time, the congregation became more traditional and Orthodox under the leadership of Rabbi Simon A. Dolgin. In 1955, its day school was named the Hillel Hebrew Academy and moved into a building one block away.

After Dolgin moved to Ramat Eshkol, Jerusalem, Israel, Maurice Lamm served as rabbi from 1971 to 1984. He was followed by Abner Weiss from 1984 to 2000, and Steven Weil from 2000 to 2009. Since 2009, Kalman Topp has served as the Senior Rabbi.

In July 2014, a ceremony was held at Beth Jacob to honor the memory of murdered Israeli teenagers Yaakov Naftali Frankel, Gilad Michoel Shaar and Eyal Yifrach. Lihi Shaar, the aunt of Gilad Shaar, is a member of Beth Jacob.
