= Judge Moses Weinstein Playground =

Public park in Queens, New York

Coordinates: 40.71816°N 73.82066°W

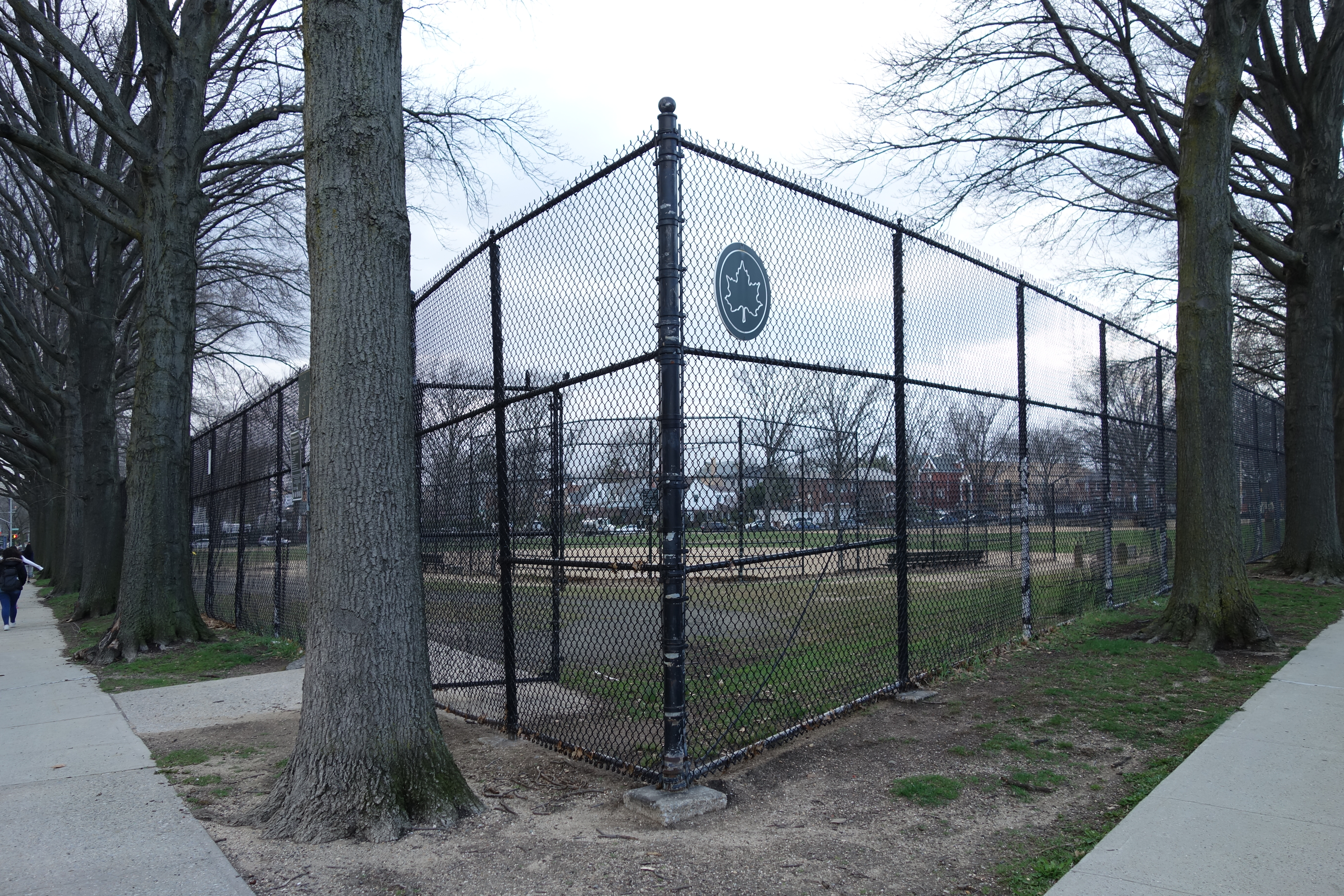
Judge Moses Weinstein Playground

Judge Moses Weinstein Playground is a 3.25-acre triangular park located in the Kew Gardens Hills neighborhood of Queens, New York City.

== History ==
The park was acquired by the city in 1948 in response to local demand for open space and recreational facilities. Residential construction increased following the Second World War, ushered in by the growth and expansion of roadways new and old, resulting in many homes but few parks and schools.

Judge Moses Weinstein Playground takes its name from Moses M. Weinstein, a respected legislator, jurist and civic leader who resided in Kew Gardens Hills for nearly a half century. Weinstein was born on the Lower East Side in 1912 and received his education at Brooklyn College and Brooklyn Law School. During the Second World War, he fought in the Battle of the Bulge, a last-ditch effort by the Nazi forces to delay an allied invasion of Germany.

After the war, Weinstein settled in Kew Gardens Hills, taking an active role in the Kew Gardens Hills Civic Association and the Democratic Party. He first ran for State Assembly in 1958, winning the first of his six terms at the seat. During his time as a lawmaker, Weinstein rose in stature to become the Assembly Majority Leader and Chair of the Queens County Democratic Organization. Weinstein stood out from among his 150 colleagues through progressive legislation that provided relief for the public such as the Crime Victims’ Compensation Board, consumer bill of rights and financial aid for air-pollution controls.

In 1969, Weinstein was elected as a Queens State Supreme Court justice, rising over the years to the Appellate Court, where he presided until his retirement in 1989. As a judge, Weinstein ruled on cases that determined due process and constitutionality in public school financing.

Formerly called Vleigh Place Playground, the site was renamed in 2008 under the auspices of Parks Commissioner Adrian Benepe on the first anniversary of Weinstein's death.

Today the park includes an array of recreational facilities and large playing fields for the pleasure of the surrounding community of Kew Gardens Hills.
