= Sam Berger (New York politician) =

American politician

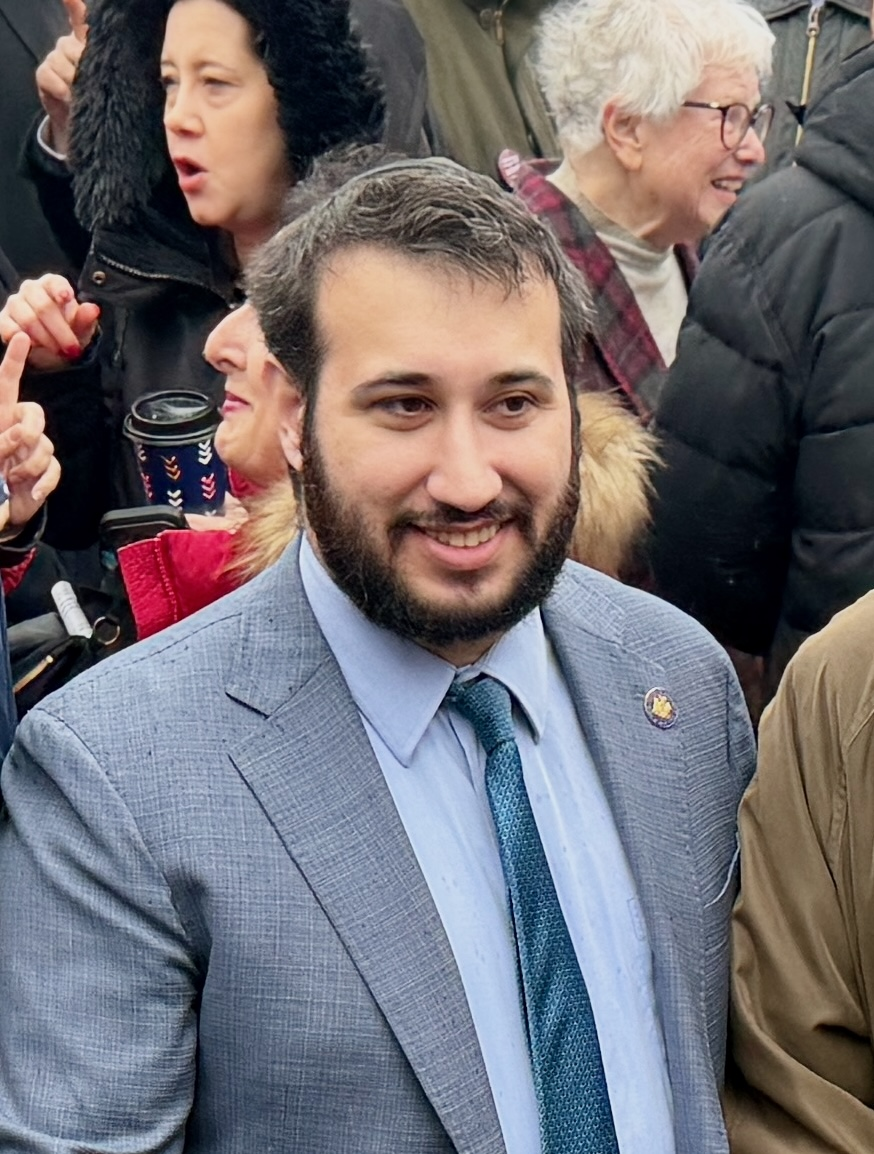
- Berger in 2025

Member of the New York State Assembly from the 27th district
- Incumbent
- Assumed office September 14, 2023
- Preceded by: Daniel Rosenthal

Personal details
- Born: March 20, 1998 (age 28) Queens, New York
- Party: Democratic
- Children: 2
- Education: Excelsior University (BA); St. John's University School of Law (JD)
- Website: State Assembly website

Shmuie Berger is an American Jewish politician who is the representative for New York's 27th State Assembly district. He was elected in a 2023 special election to replace Daniel Rosenthal, who resigned to take a position at UJA-Federation of New York. Berger is a member of the Democratic Party.

== Early life and education ==
Berger was reportedly born and raised in the 27th State Assembly district in Queens, New York. He graduated from Mesivta Ateres Yaakov in 2016. Berger then graduated from Excelsior University with a Bachelor of Arts and from St. John's University School of Law with a Juris Doctor in 2023. After studying at the Bircas HaTorah for four years in Israel, Berger returned to the district.

== Political career ==
Democratic representative Daniel Rosenthal resigned from representing New York's 27th State Assembly district on July 14, 2023, to take a position at UJA-Federation of New York. Rosenthal endorsed Berger as his successor in the special election. The Republican Party nominated David Hirsch; both Berger and Hirsch are Orthodox Jews. Berger campaigned as a moderate. The election was described as a bellwether race, with Republican Lee Zeldin having won the district in the 2022 New York gubernatorial election. Berger won the election 55%–45%.

== Electoral history ==
2023 New York's 27th State Assembly district special election
| Party | Candidate | Votes | % |
|---|---|---|---|
| Democratic | Sam Berger | 2,447 | 55.14% |
| Republican | David Hirsch | 1,979 | 44.59% |
| Write-in | | 12 | 0.27% |
| Total votes | | 4,438 | 100.00 |
| Democratic hold | | | |
