= Daniel Rosenthal (politician) =

American politician

Member of the New York State Assembly from the 27th district
- In office November 8, 2017 – July 14, 2023
- Preceded by: Michael Simanowitz
- Succeeded by: Sam Berger

Personal details
- Born: June 4, 1991 (age 35)
- Party: Democratic
- Education: Lander College for Men (BA)
- Website: assembly.state.ny.us/mem/Daniel-Rosenthal/bio/

Daniel Rosenthal (born June 4, 1991) is an American politician who was a Democratic member of the New York State Assembly, representing District 27 from 2017 to 2023. Rosenthal represents the central and eastern Queens neighborhoods of Kew Gardens Hills, Pomonok, Electchester, and College Point, and parts of Kew Gardens, Richmond Hill, Briarwood, Forest Hills, and Whitestone. On July 14, 2023, Rosenthal resigned to take a position at UJA-Federation of New York.

== Life and career ==
Rosenthal is a graduate of Lander College in Queens, where he studied Political Science. Upon graduation, he began working as a Councilmanic Aide for New York City Councilman Rory Lancman for 6 years, serving as Lancman's District Director. Some of his accomplishments included pushing the city's Department of Design and Construction to finally complete the long-awaited Kew Gardens Hills Library, representing the district's interests on the Flushing Meadows Corona Park Community Advisory Board, and helping to secure increased sanitation services in Briarwood and Kew Gardens Hills.

== New York Assembly ==
When Assemblymember Michael Simanowitz, who had served since 2011, died of cancer, a special election was called by New York Governor Andrew Cuomo for November 7, 2017. Rosenthal won the election unopposed, and was seated soon after. When he was sworn into office, he was the youngest serving member in the Assembly.

=== Legislative and budget achievements ===
In his first term in office, Rosenthal tackled a number of legislative issues aimed at improving the quality of life for his constituents. He introduced several bills directly taken from resident suggestions, and focused his legislative priorities on the fight to improve worker rights, affordability and access to health care.

In June 2018, Assemblymember Rosenthal passed his first bill, directing the MTA Long Island Railroad to conduct a feasibility study of rehabilitating the Lefferts Boulevard bridge in the heart of Kew Gardens. After years of neglect, the LIRR agreed to rehabilitation after Rosenthal's bill was passed. Working alongside Senator Leroy Comrie and the Kew Gardens Civic Association, the bill ensured that the structure of the bridge would be saved, while maintaining the architectural integrity of the neighborhood and securing the future of a dozen small businesses.

In June 2019, Assemblymember Rosenthal passed important legislation aimed at protecting New Yorkers from hazardous drug recalls. Until this bill, there were no requirements for pharmacies to notify patients of the adverse health consequences associated with Class 1 drug recalls. The law mandated pharmacies to notify patients within 3 days of recalls.

Assemblymember Rosenthal was a co-sponsor of the Religious Protection Act, which was signed into law by Governor Cuomo in early 2019. Introduced by Assemblymember David Weprin, this law prohibited employment discrimination based on religious attire, clothing, or facial hair.

In March 2019, Assemblymember Rosenthal announced $250,000 in funding to provide services and programming for Holocaust survivors. This is in line with the Assemblymember's mission to support those who have been vulnerable to antisemitic crimes in their lifetimes. Rosenthal has also secured millions in funding for local schools, libraries, social services agencies, and municipal services.

=== Committee membership ===
Assemblymember Rosenthal is Chair of the Subcommittee on Intergenerational Care, and is a member of the Committee on Aging, the Committee on Insurance, the Committee on Labor, the Committee on Real Property Taxation, and the Committee on Social Services.

Political offices
Preceded by Michael Simanowitz	New York Assembly, 27th District; 2017–2023	Succeeded by Sam Berger
