= Michael Simanowitz =

American politician (1971–2017)

Member of the New York State Assembly from the 27th district
- In office September 14, 2011 – September 2, 2017
- Preceded by: Nettie Mayersohn
- Succeeded by: Daniel Rosenthal

Personal details
- Born: August 10, 1971 Forest Hills, Queens, New York
- Died: September 2, 2017 (aged 46)
- Party: Democratic
- Education: Queens College

Michael Simanowitz (August 10, 1971 – September 2, 2017) was a Democratic New York State Assembly member from the borough of Queens.

== Election to New York State Assembly ==
Simanowitz was a resident of the Electchester housing cooperative, part of the neighborhood of Pomonok in the New York City borough of Queens. He was chief of staff to Nettie Mayersohn, the local assemblywoman for 28 years, and after Mayersohn announced her retirement, Simanowitz was elected in a special election on September 14, 2011, to replace her.

== Auxiliary police officer ==
Simanowitz served on the New York City Police Department Auxiliary Police's 107 Precinct Auxiliary Unit since 1995. For nine years he served as that unit's commanding officer. Simanowitz achieved the rank of Auxiliary Deputy Inspector.

== Death ==
Simanowitz died on September 2, 2017, at the age of 46 after an undisclosed illness.

New York State Assembly
Preceded by Nettie Mayersohn	New York State Assembly; 27th District; 2011–2017	Succeeded by Daniel Rosenthal
