= V (New York City Subway service) =

Rapid transit service (2001–2010)

- Sixth Avenue Local

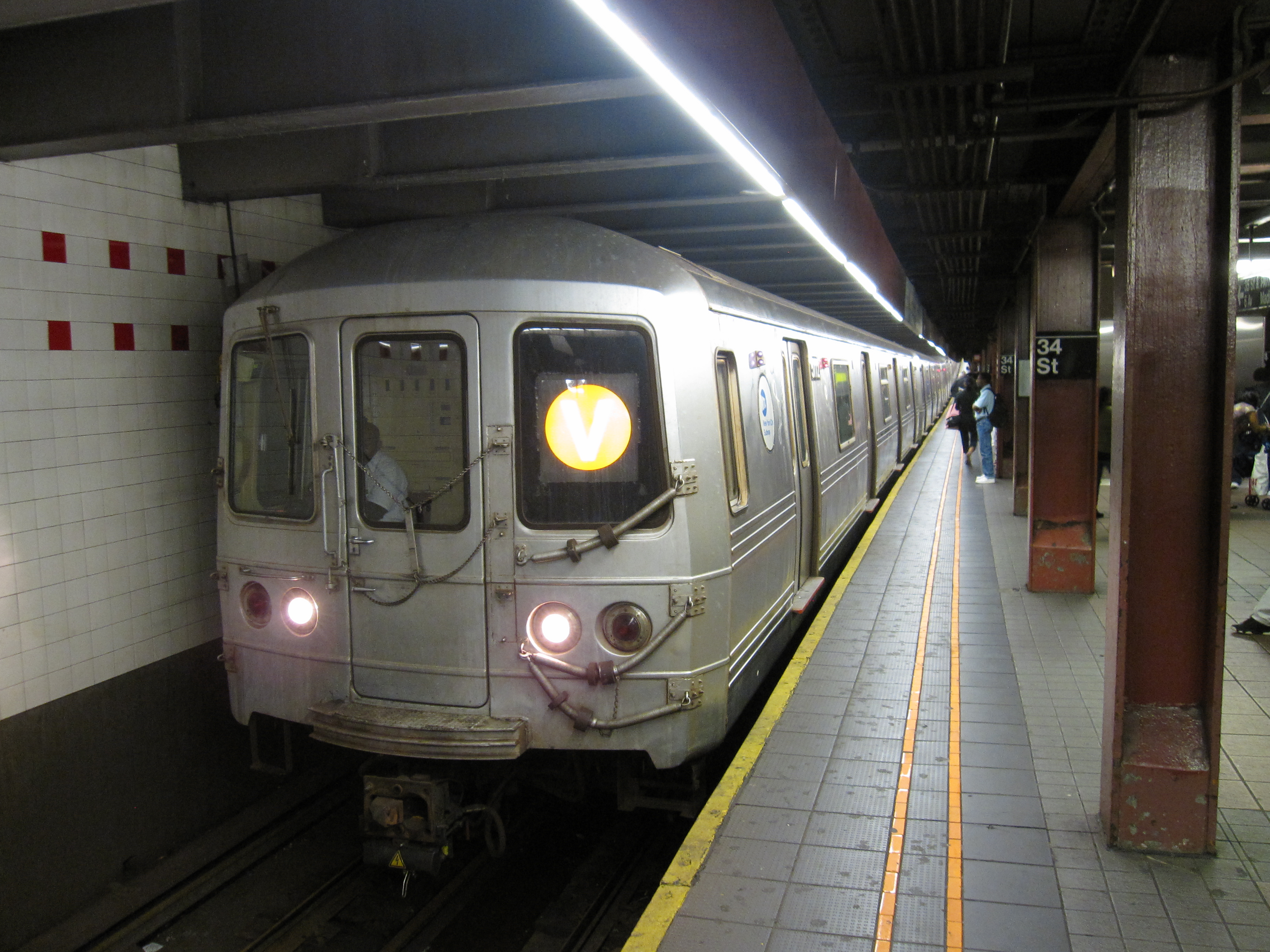
- Queens-bound V train of R46s at 34th Street–Herald Square

- Western end: Lower East Side–Second Avenue
- Eastern end: Forest Hills–71st Avenue
- Stations: 24
- Started service: December 17, 2001; 24 years ago
- Discontinued: June 25, 2010; 16 years ago

The V Sixth Avenue Local was a rapid transit service in the B Division of the New York City Subway. Its route emblem, or "bullet", was colored orange since it used the IND Sixth Avenue Line in Manhattan.

The V operated weekdays only from approximately 6:30 a.m. to midnight between 71st Avenue in Forest Hills, Queens and Second Avenue, near the border of the East Village and the Lower East Side, Manhattan.

The V debuted on December 17, 2001, when the connection from the IND 63rd Street Line to the IND Queens Boulevard Line opened as a replacement for the F, which was rerouted via this new connection, on the IND 53rd Street Line. Except for a brief period in early 2005, the V had the same service pattern during its eight-and-a-half-year history. As part of a series of service reductions to close a budget gap, the V train was eliminated on June 25, 2010. With the exception of service at Second Avenue, it was combined with the M train, which was rerouted from Lower Manhattan and South Brooklyn via the Chrystie Street Connection.

== Service history ==
=== Context ===
The V was originally devised as an extra Sixth Avenue service designation that first appeared on rollsign curtains ordered as early as 1982 for the R10 through R38 B Division subway car classes to replace outdated rollsigns. It would also appear on rollsign curtains ordered for the then-new R68, R68A and R110B subway cars which entered service between 1986 and 1993, as well as on replacement rollsign curtains ordered for the R30 through R46 B Division subway cars overhauled between 1985 and 1992.

=== Debut ===
In December 2000, the MTA announced plans for a new subway route to operate between 71st Avenue in Queens and Second Avenue in Manhattan. This new route would be designated as the V and would operate along the Queens Boulevard Line, the 53rd Street Tunnel, and the Sixth Avenue Line, making all stops along the full route. This new route would supplement the E via 53rd Street and the F via Sixth Avenue.

The introduction of the V was expected to increase the number of Queens Boulevard trains entering Manhattan by nine trains per hour. To make room for the V on Queens Boulevard, F trains were rerouted full-time via the 63rd Street Connector, and G trains were cut back to a new weekday rush hour and midday terminal at Long Island City–Court Square. In Manhattan, F and V trains made identical stops between 47th–50th Streets and the V train's Lower East Side–Second Avenue terminal. To prepare for this service, weekday rush hour service was simulated on Saturday, April 14, 2001 from 9:45 to 11:30 AM. V trains operated on a six-minute frequency between 71st Avenue and 57th Street–Seventh Avenue via 63rd Street and made all stops. This test took place to determine if existing G service along Queens Boulevard could be maintained along with V trains simultaneously; G trains operated on a ten-minute frequency, terminated at 179th Street in the northbound direction and originated at 71st Avenue in the southbound direction. The MTA board's transit committee voted on May 25 to recommend that the entirety of the board vote on the proposed V train. On May 31, the MTA board approved the operating plan for the opening of the 63rd Street Connector, including the beginning of V service, which was to begin on November 11. Another weekday simulation took place during the daytime hours on Saturday, September 8, adapting the service pattern that would be implemented when the V would debut, but without the G operating along Queens Boulevard during weekday rush hours and middays. Due to the September 11 attacks, the V did not debut until December 17. Service ran every six minutes during rush hours and ten minutes other times, running southbound from 71st Avenue between 5:38 a.m. and 10:57 p.m., and northbound from Second Avenue between 5:54 a.m. and 11:33 p.m..

=== Controversy ===
The new service plan was designed to redistribute Queens-bound passenger loads along the heavily used IND Sixth Avenue Line by encouraging use of the additional local trains provided for shorter trips, and to improve service and transfer opportunities for passengers using local stations along Queens Boulevard. The New York Times described the service plan as "complex and heavily criticized." New York Times columnist Randy Kennedy wrote that four months after it opened, the service was operating at only 49% of capacity. However, ridership had "increased 30 percent since it began, and every new V rider, as lonely as he or she might be, relieves crowding on the E." The Straphangers Campaign and Queens Civic Congress organized protests in 2002 to request the V train be rerouted to the 63rd Street Tunnel.

The overcrowding on the E train was, in part, due to riders' propensity to board an express even in situations where it offers no real advantage in travel time over the local. Conductors were asked to make scripted announcements to urge riders to use the V, noting that they had a better chance of getting a seat on the train. By May 2002, ridership started picking up on the V, and crowding on the E was reduced from 115% of capacity during rush hours to 96%.

Kennedy sought out and interviewed some passengers who were not happy with the V's debut:

Last week, there were two express trains (the E and the F) running along Queens Boulevard to 53rd Street and Lexington Avenue, the station where many people catch the Lexington line. Now, there is only one express (the E) and a local (the V) going to that popular station. And the other express (the F) detours to a less popular station, 63rd and Lexington, where you cannot transfer to the Lexington Avenue Line without walking outside for a few blocks. So the questions being asked privately, and sometimes very publicly, in Queens stations yesterday were: Do I take a train not going where I'm going and — God forbid — transfer? Do I take a relatively uncrowded train that goes where I'm going but that gives me the scenic tour of subterranean Queens?

On January 23, 2005, a fire destroyed the signal room of Chambers Street on the IND Eighth Avenue Line. V service was temporarily extended to Euclid Avenue until C service was restored on February 2.

=== Merger of V and M trains ===
In late 2009, the MTA confronted a financial crisis, and many of the same service cuts threatened just months earlier during a previous budget crisis were revisited. One of the proposals included completely phasing out M service and using the V as its replacement. Under this proposal, the V would no longer serve its southern terminus at Lower East Side–Second Avenue. Instead, after leaving Broadway–Lafayette Street, it would take the Chrystie Street Connection to join the BMT Nassau Street Line, and stop at Essex Street in Manhattan before crossing the Williamsburg Bridge and serving all M stations to Middle Village-Metropolitan Avenue in Queens.

The MTA determined that this move, while still a service cut, would actually benefit M passengers, as approximately 17,000 of them traveled to its stations in Lower Manhattan, whereas 22,000 transferred to other lines to reach destinations in Midtown Manhattan. Additionally, this merger would open up new travel options for northern Brooklyn and Queens J/Z riders, in that it would allow direct and more convenient access to areas that were not served by those routes before such as Midtown Manhattan.

On March 19, 2010, it was decided that the V designation would be discontinued and the new service would retain the M's designation instead, which would now be designated with an orange symbol representing an IND Sixth Avenue Line train. Many MTA board members had opposed the elimination of the M designation, saying that passengers would be more comfortable with an M designation rather than a V designation, and because the M had been around longer than the V.

The V ceased operation on Friday, June 25, 2010, with the last train bound for Forest Hills–71st Avenue leaving Lower East Side–Second Avenue at 11:33 p.m. Official M service via the Chrystie Street Connection began on Monday, June 28, 2010. From July 3, 2017, until April 27, 2018, reconstruction work on the BMT Myrtle Avenue Line resulted in some M trains operating between 71st Avenue in Queens and Second Avenue in Manhattan during rush hours, replicating the V's original routing.

== Signage History ==
The bullet used from 2001-2010

== Final route ==
=== Lines used ===
The following lines were used by the V from December 2001 to June 2010:

Line	From	To	Tracks
IND Queens Boulevard Line	71st Avenue	Queens Plaza	local
IND Queens Boulevard Line	Queens Plaza	Fifth Avenue/53rd Street	all
IND Sixth Avenue Line	47th–50th Streets–Rockefeller Center	Lower East Side–Second Avenue	local

=== Stations ===
For a more detailed station listing, see the articles on the lines listed above.

Station service legend
Stops all times	Stops 24 hours a day
Stops all times except late nights	Stops every day during daytime hours only
Stops late nights and weekends	Stops everyday during overnight hours and weekends during daytime hours only
Stops weekdays during the day	Stops during weekday daytime hours only
Stops rush hours in the peak direction only	Stops weekdays in the peak direction only
Time period details
Disabled access	Station is compliant with the Americans with Disabilities Act
↑	Station is compliant with the Americans with Disabilities Act in the indicated direction only
↓	Station is compliant with the Americans with Disabilities Act in the indicated direction only
	Elevator access to mezzanine only

V service	Stations	Disabled access	Subway transfers	Connections and notes
Queens
Queens Boulevard Line
Stops weekdays during the day	Forest Hills–71st Avenue	(Note: This station was made accessible after the V was discontinued.)	E F G R	LIRR Main Line at Forest Hills
Stops weekdays during the day	67th Avenue		G R	
Stops weekdays during the day	63rd Drive–Rego Park		G R	Q72 to LaGuardia Airport
Stops weekdays during the day	Woodhaven Boulevard		G R	
Stops weekdays during the day	Grand Avenue–Newtown		G R	
Stops weekdays during the day	Elmhurst Avenue		G R	
Stops weekdays during the day	Jackson Heights–Roosevelt Avenue	Disabled access	E F G R 7 (IRT Flushing Line) at 74th Street–Broadway	Q33 bus to LaGuardia Airport; Q47 bus to LaGuardia Marine Air Terminal
Stops weekdays during the day	65th Street		G R	
Stops weekdays during the day	Northern Boulevard		G R	
Stops weekdays during the day	46th Street		G R	
Stops weekdays during the day	Steinway Street		G R	
Stops weekdays during the day	36th Street		G R	
Stops weekdays during the day	Queens Plaza	Disabled access	E G R	
Stops weekdays during the day	23rd Street–Ely Avenue		E F <F> G (IND Crosstown Line at Long Island City–Court Square); 7 <7> (IRT Flushing Line at 45th Road–Court House Square; MetroCard-only transfer)	
Manhattan
Stops weekdays during the day	Lexington Avenue–53rd Street	Disabled access	E F <F> 6 <6> (IRT Lexington Avenue Line at 51st Street)	
Stops weekdays during the day	Fifth Avenue/53rd Street		E F <F>	
Sixth Avenue Line
Stops weekdays during the day	47th–50th Streets–Rockefeller Center	Disabled access	B D F	
Stops weekdays during the day	42nd Street–Bryant Park		B D F 7 <7> (IRT Flushing Line at Fifth Avenue)	
Stops weekdays during the day	34th Street–Herald Square	Disabled access	B D F N Q R W (BMT Broadway Line)	PATH at 33rd Street
Stops weekdays during the day	23rd Street		F	PATH at 23rd Street
Stops weekdays during the day	14th Street		F 1 2 3 (IRT Broadway–Seventh Avenue Line at 14th Street); L (BMT Canarsie Line at Sixth Avenue)	PATH at 14th Street
Stops weekdays during the day	West Fourth Street–Washington Square	Disabled access	B D F A C E (IND Eighth Avenue Line)	PATH at Ninth Street
Stops weekdays during the day	Broadway–Lafayette Street		B D F 6 <6> (IRT Lexington Avenue Line at Bleecker Street; transfer to downtown trains only)	
Stops weekdays during the day	Lower East Side–Second Avenue		F	
