= 46th Street station (IND Queens Boulevard Line) =

New York City Subway station in Queens

46 Street
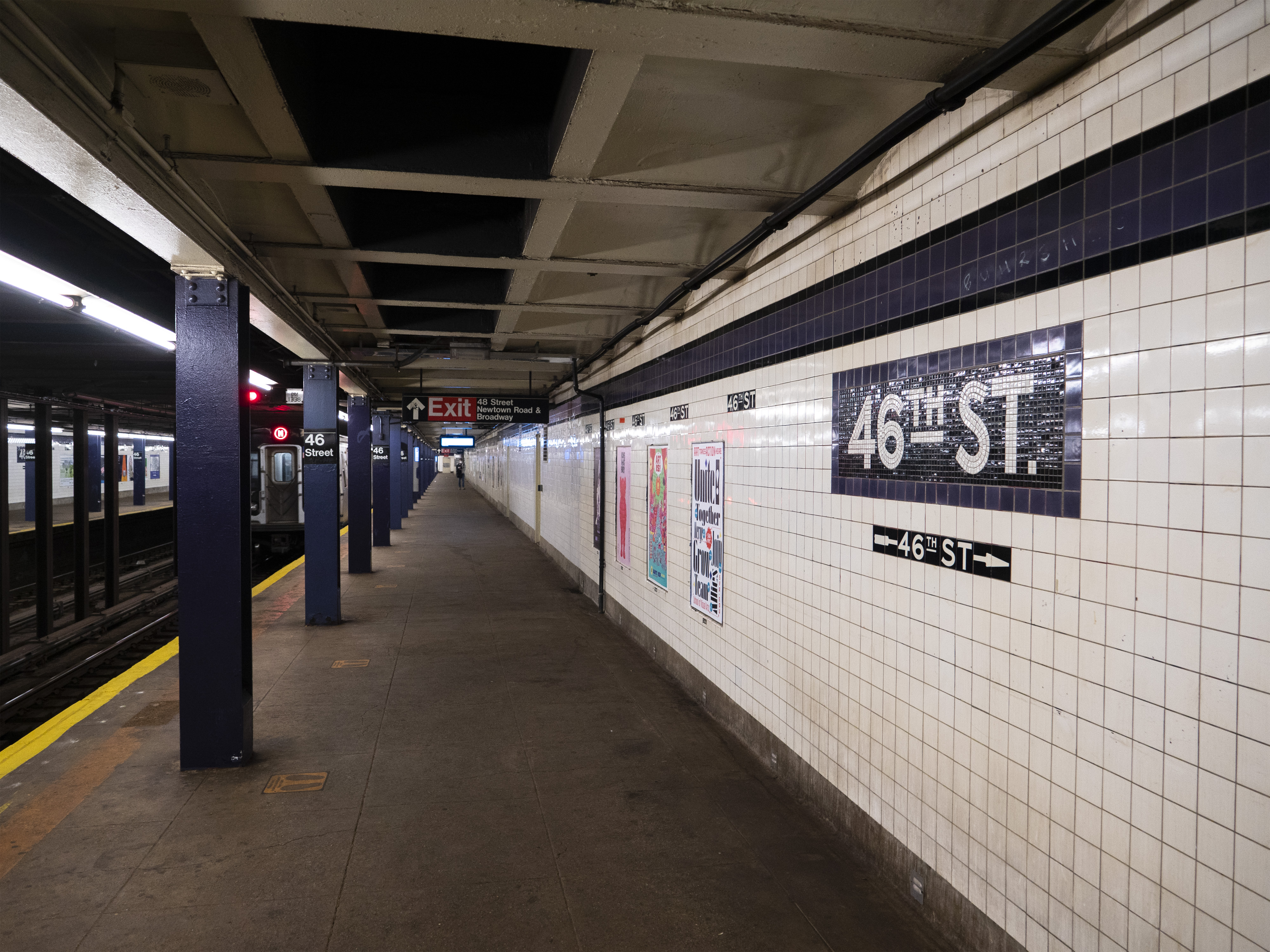
- View of northbound platform with an R160 M train leaving the station

Station statistics
- Address: 46th Street & Broadway; Queens, New York
- Borough: Queens
- Locale: Astoria
- Coordinates: 40.756685°N 73.914256°W
- Division: B (IND)
- Line: IND Queens Boulevard Line
- Services: E (late nights); F (late nights); M (weekdays during the day); R (all times except late nights)
- Transit: MTA Bus: Q104
- Structure: Underground
- Platforms: 2 side platforms
- Tracks: 2

Other information
- Opened: August 19, 1933; 93 years ago

Traffic
- 2025: 1,900,184 ▲18%
- Rank: 184 out of 423
Services
Preceding station	New York City Subway	Following station
Steinway Street E F M R via 36th Street	Local	Northern Boulevard E F M R toward Forest Hills–71st Avenue
Location
Location within New York City Subway
Location within New York City
Location within New York
Track layout
Street map
Station service legend
Symbol	Description
Stops all times except late nights	Stops all times except late nights
Stops late nights only	Stops late nights only
Stops weekdays during the day	Stops weekdays during the day

The 46th Street station is a local station on the IND Queens Boulevard Line of the New York City Subway. Located at the intersection of 46th Street and Broadway in Astoria, Queens, it is served by the M train on weekdays, and by the R train at all times except late nights, when the E and F trains take over service.

== History ==
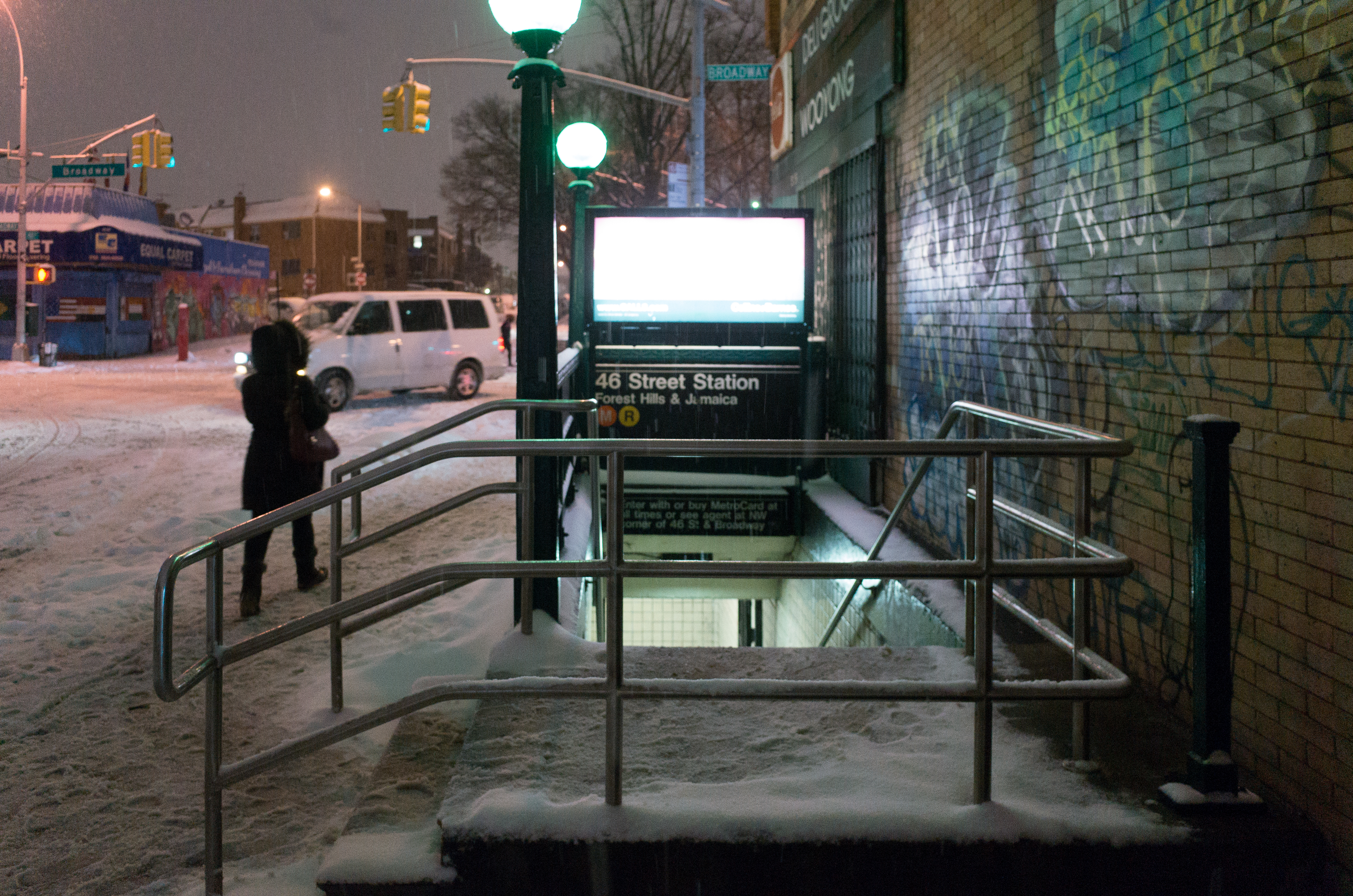
Entrance to the Queens-bound platform

The Queens Boulevard Line was one of the first lines built by the city-owned Independent Subway System (IND), and stretches between the IND Eighth Avenue Line in Manhattan and 179th Street and Hillside Avenue in Jamaica, Queens. The Queens Boulevard Line was in part financed by a Public Works Administration (PWA) loan and grant of $25 million. One of the proposed stations would have been located at 46th Street.

The first section of the line, west from Roosevelt Avenue to 50th Street, opened on August 19, 1933. E trains ran local to Hudson Terminal (today's World Trade Center) in Manhattan, while the GG (predecessor to current G service) ran as a shuttle service between Queens Plaza and Nassau Avenue on the IND Crosstown Line.

The station entrances to 48th Street did not open until some time after October 1933, when the Astoria Heights Taxpayers Association circulated petitions demanding that these entrances be opened.

The station was closed in June 2023 for structural improvements.

== Station layout ==
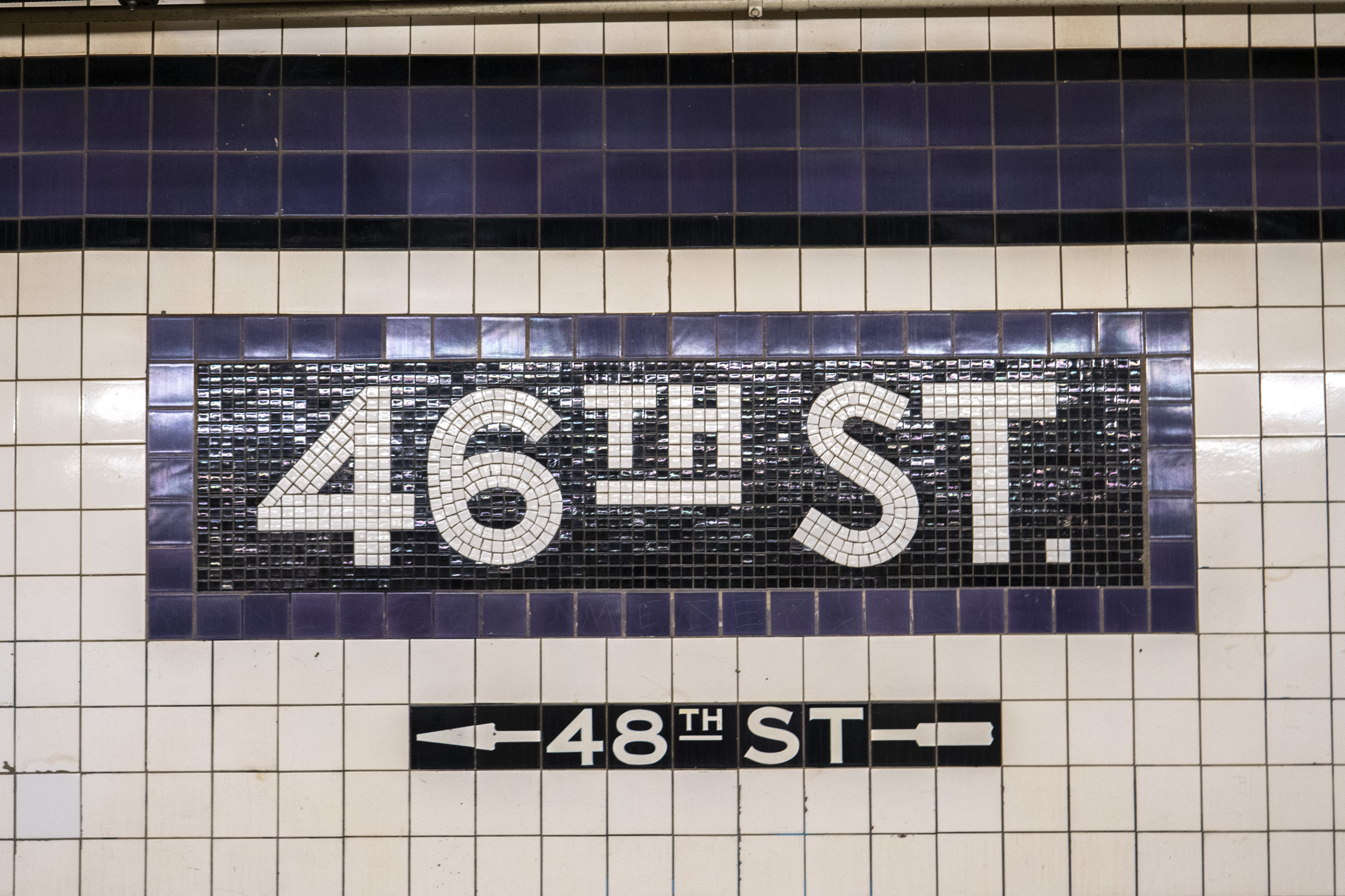
Mosaic name tablet

This underground station has two tracks and two side platforms. The E and F trains serve the station at night, the M train serves the station on weekdays during the day, and the R train serves the station at all times except late nights. The station is between Steinway Street to the west and Northern Boulevard to the east. The express tracks on the IND Queens Boulevard Line, used by the E and F trains during daytime hours, run via a separate routing under Northern Boulevard.

Both platforms have a purple tile band with a black border and mosaic name tablets reading "46TH ST." in white sans-serif lettering on a black background and purple border. Small tile captions reading "46TH ST" in white on black run below the tile band, and directional signs in the same style are present under some of the name tablets. The tile band was part of a color-coded tile system used throughout the IND. The tile colors were designed to facilitate navigation for travelers going away from Lower Manhattan. As such, the purple tiles used at the 46th Street station were originally also used at Queens Plaza, the next express station to the west, while a different tile color is used at Jackson Heights–Roosevelt Avenue, the next express station to the east. Purple tiles are similarly used at the other local stations between Queens Plaza and Roosevelt Avenue.

Fixed platform barriers, which are intended to prevent commuters falling to the tracks, are positioned near the platform edges. Royal purple I-beam columns run along both platforms at regular intervals, alternating ones having the standard black station name plate with white lettering. The I-beam piers are located every 15 feet (4.6 m) and support girders above the platforms. The roof girders are also connected to columns in the platform walls. The tunnel is covered by a U-shaped trough that contains utility pipes and wires. The outer walls of this trough are composed of columns, spaced approximately every 5 feet (1.5 m) with concrete infill between them. There is a 1-inch (25 mm) gap between the tunnel wall and the platform wall, which is made of 4-inch (100 mm)-thick brick covered over by a tiled finish. The columns between the tracks are also spaced every 5 feet (1.5 m), with no infill.

=== Exits ===
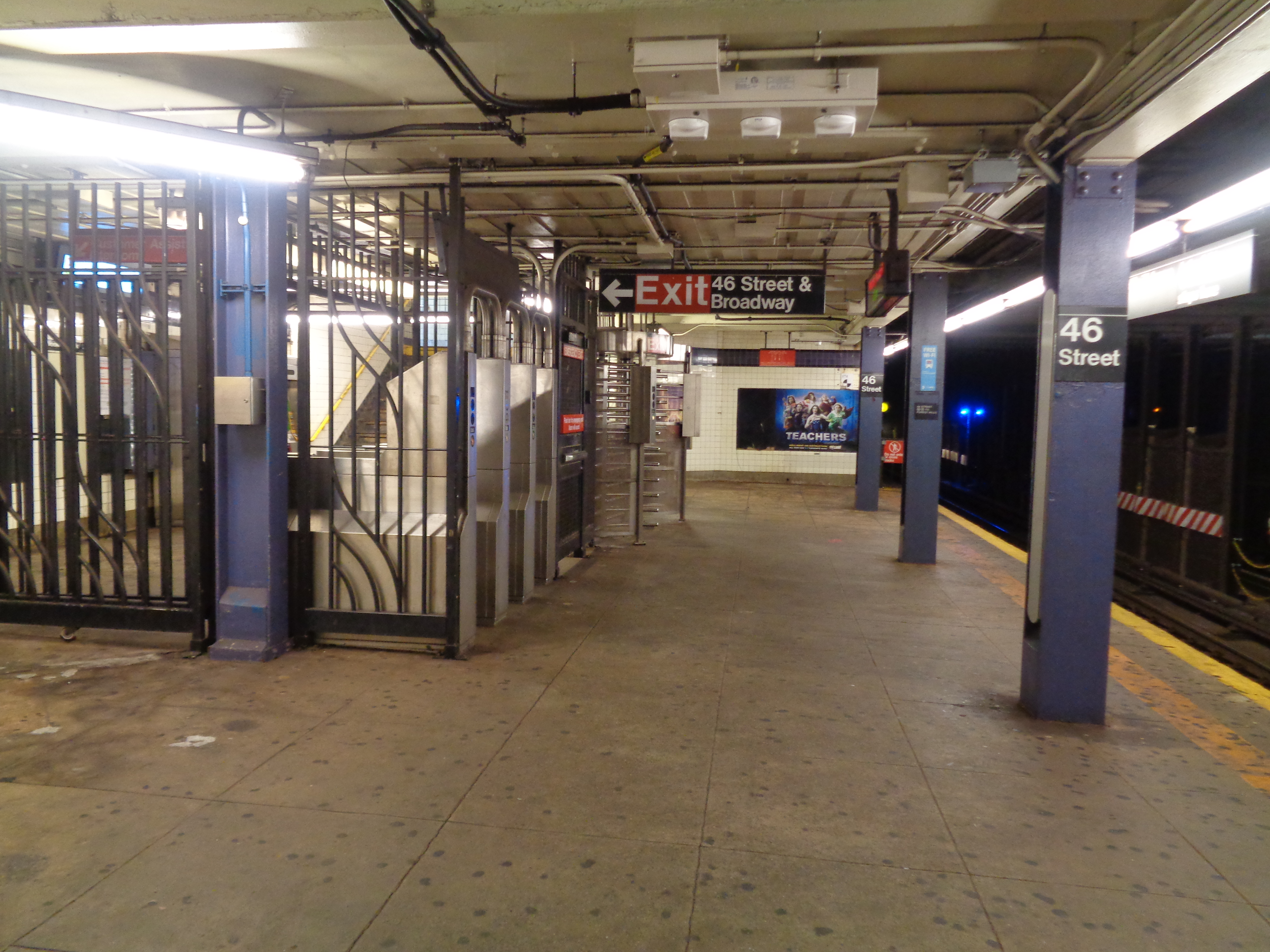
Fare control area on the Queens-bound platform

Both platforms have one same-level fare control area at either ends and there are no crossovers or crossunders. The full-time side is at the west (railroad south) end of the Manhattan-bound platform. It has a turnstile bank, token booth, and one staircase to the northwest corner of 46th Street and Broadway. The fare control area on the same end of Forest Hills-bound platform has a part-time turnstile bank and token booth (with two High Entry-Exit Turnstiles providing access to and from the station at all times) and one staircase to the southwest corner of 46th Street and Broadway.

The fare control area on the east (railroad north) end of the Manhattan-bound platform has a turnstile bank (with two High Entry-Exit Turnstiles providing access to and from the station at all times) and one staircase going up to the north side of Newtown Road between Broadway and 48th Street. The fare control area on this end of the Forest Hills-bound also contains full height turnstiles, as well as one staircase going up to the southeast corner of Broadway and 48th Street.

Old token booths at this station were located at the center of both platforms. Both token booths have since been repurposed; the Forest Hills-bound platform has a set of doors leading into an employee-only facility while the Manhattan-bound platform has a wide fenced off area.
