= Northern Boulevard station =

New York City Subway station in Queens

Northern Blvd
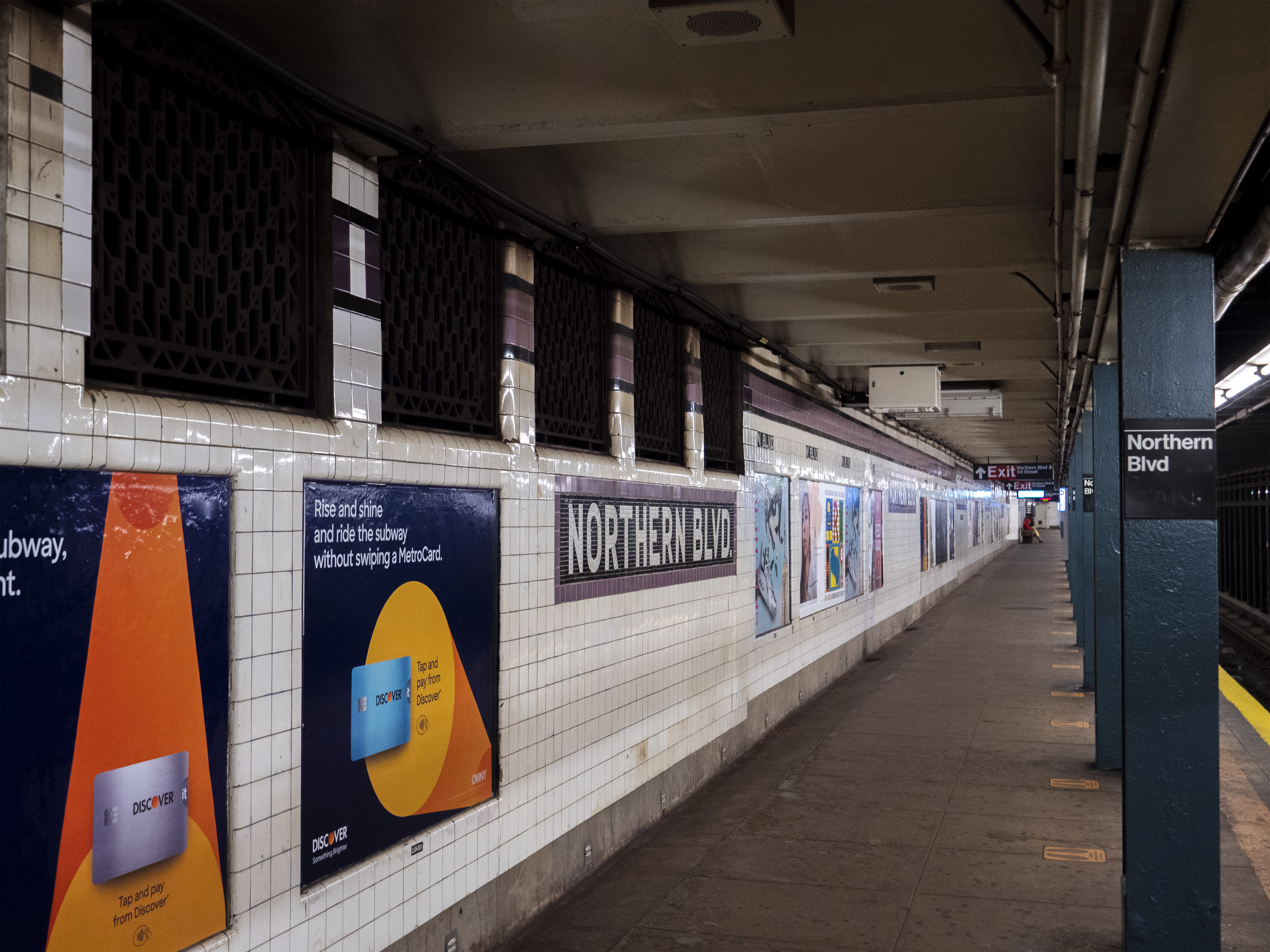
- View of northbound platform

Station statistics
- Address: Northern Boulevard & Broadway; Queens, New York
- Borough: Queens
- Locale: Woodside
- Coordinates: 40.753239°N 73.906918°W
- Division: B (IND)
- Line: IND Queens Boulevard Line
- Services: E (late nights); F (late nights); M (weekdays during the day); R (all times except late nights)
- Transit: MTA Bus: Q18, Q63, Q66
- Structure: Underground
- Platforms: 2 side platforms
- Tracks: 2

Other information
- Opened: August 19, 1933; 93 years ago
- Accessible: Yes

Traffic
- 2025: 1,586,412 ▲11.1%
- Rank: 222 out of 423
Services
Preceding station	New York City Subway	Following station
46th Street E F M R via 36th Street	Local	65th Street E F M R toward Forest Hills–71st Avenue
does not stop here
Location
Location within New York City Subway
Location within New York City
Location within New York
Track layout
Street map
Station service legend
Symbol	Description
Stops all times except late nights	Stops all times except late nights
Stops late nights only	Stops late nights only
Stops weekdays during the day	Stops weekdays during the day

The Northern Boulevard station is a local station on the IND Queens Boulevard Line of the New York City Subway. Located at the intersection of Northern Boulevard and Broadway, it is served by the M train on weekdays, and by the R train at all times except late nights, when the E and F trains take over service.

== History ==
The Queens Boulevard Line was one of the first lines built by the city-owned Independent Subway System (IND), and stretches between the IND Eighth Avenue Line in Manhattan and 179th Street and Hillside Avenue in Jamaica, Queens. The Queens Boulevard Line was in part financed by a Public Works Administration (PWA) loan and grant of $25 million. One of the proposed stations would have been located at Northern Boulevard.

The first section of the line, west from Roosevelt Avenue to 50th Street, opened on August 19, 1933. E trains ran local to Hudson Terminal (today's World Trade Center) in Manhattan, while the GG (predecessor to current G service) ran as a shuttle service between Queens Plaza and Nassau Avenue on the IND Crosstown Line.

Under the 2015–2019 MTA Capital Plan, the station, along with 30 other New York City Subway stations, will undergo a complete overhaul and would be entirely closed for up to 6 months. Updates would include cellular service, Wi-Fi, charging stations, improved signage, and improved station lighting. However, these renovations are being deferred until the 2020–2024 Capital Program due to a lack of funding. In December 2019, the MTA announced that this station would become ADA-accessible as part of the agency's 2020–2024 Capital Program.

In 2019, as part of an initiative to increase the accessibility of the New York City Subway system, the MTA announced that it would install elevators at the Northern Boulevard station as part of the MTA's 2020–2024 Capital Program. In December 2022, the MTA announced that it would award a $146 million contract for the installation of eight elevators across four stations, including Northern Boulevard. The elevator for the northbound platform opened in March 2025, and the elevator for the southbound platform opened in August 2025.

== Station layout ==
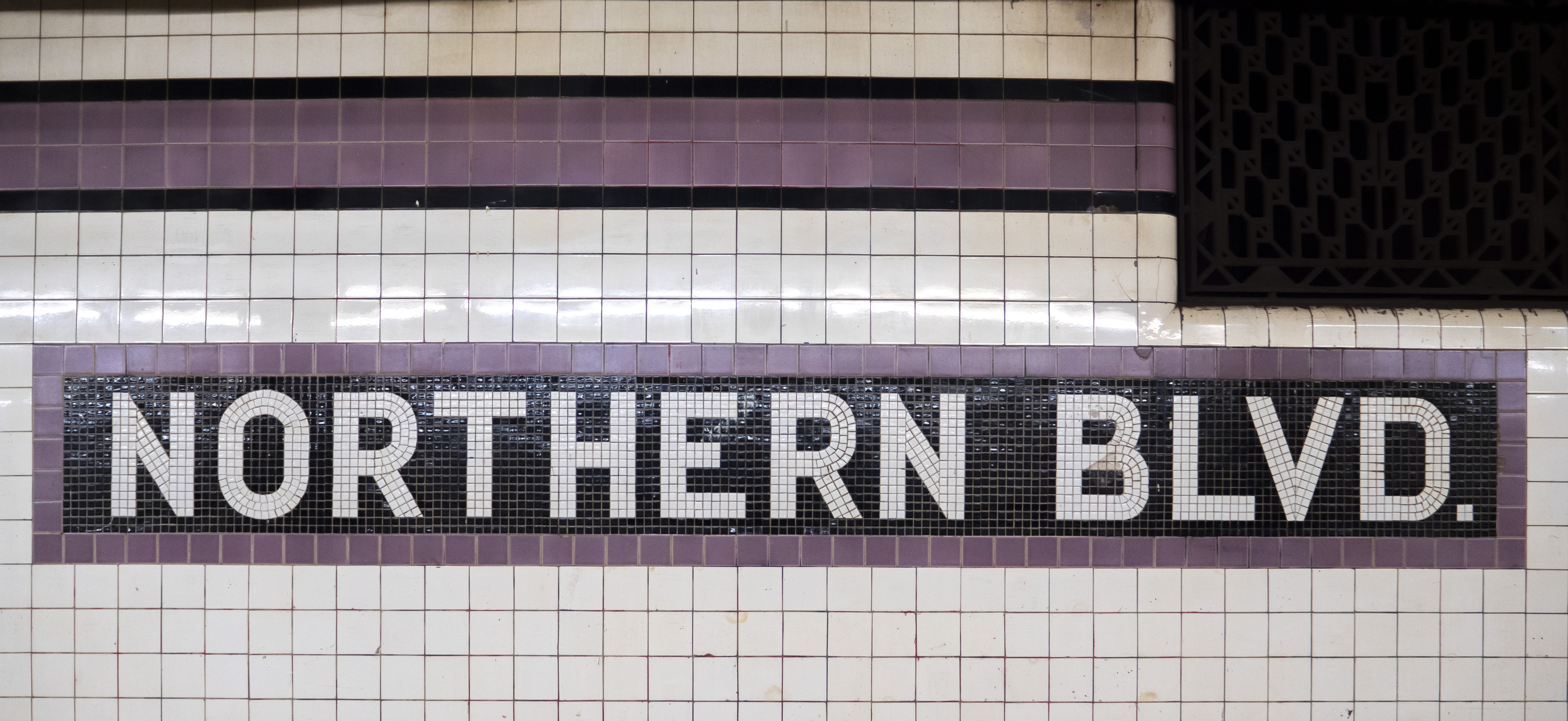
Mosaic name tablet

The station has two tracks and two side platforms. The E and F trains serve the station at night, the M train serves the station on weekdays during the day, and the R train serves the station at all times except late nights. The station is between 46th Street to the west and 65th Street to the east. The express tracks pass underneath the local tracks and are not visible from the platforms. West of the station, the express tracks turn south and run along a separate routing under Northern Boulevard.

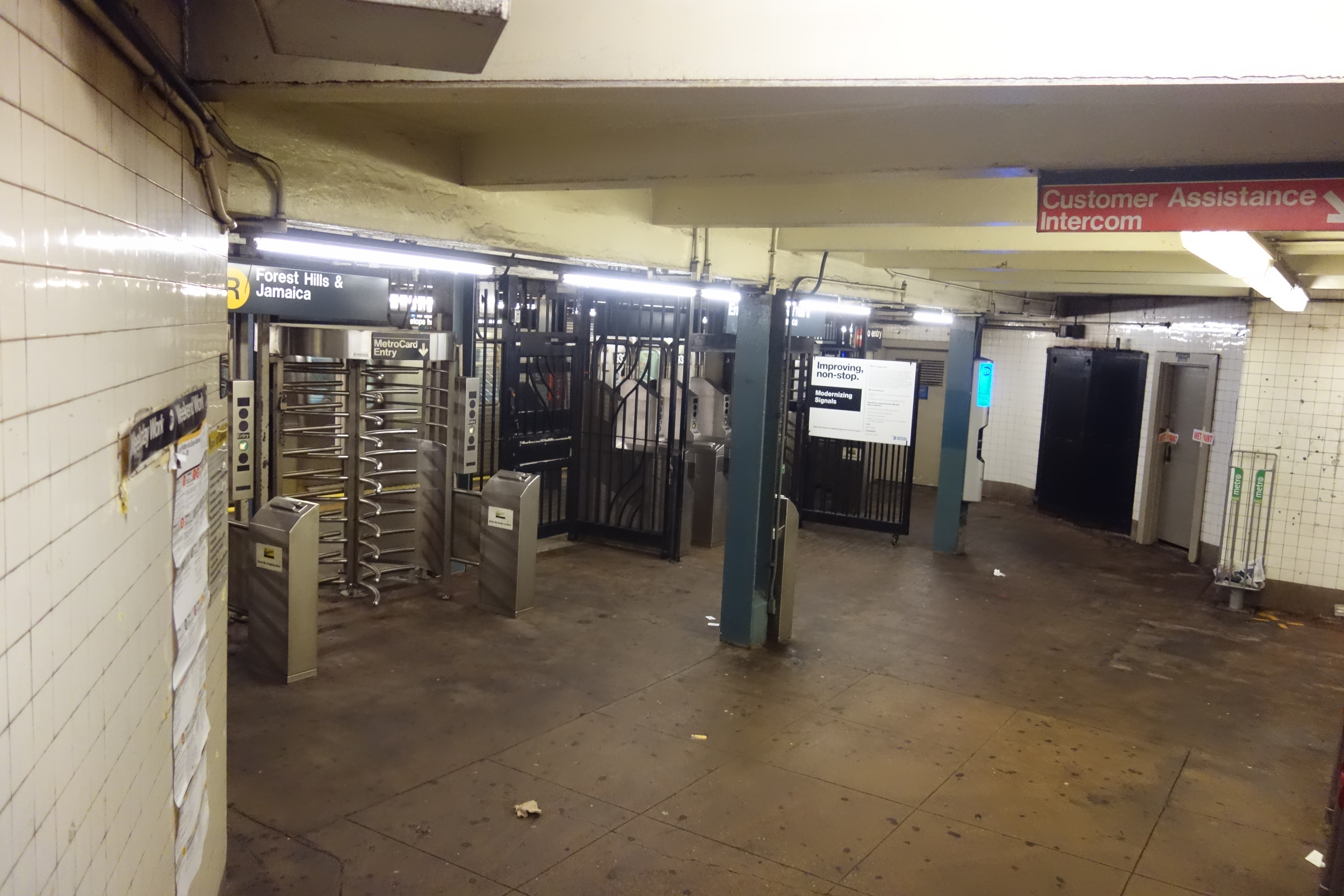
Fare control area on Queens-bound platform prior to elevator installation

Both platform walls have a purple tile band with a black border, with a number of replacement tiles in different shades of violet and purple having been placed during repairs. There are also mosaic name tablets reading "NORTHERN BLVD." in white sans-serif lettering on a black background and purple border. Small tile captions reading "N BLVD" in white lettering on black run below the tile band, and directional signs in the same style are present below some of the name tablets. The tile band was part of a color-coded tile system used throughout the IND. The tile colors were designed to facilitate navigation for travelers going away from Lower Manhattan. As such, the purple tiles used at the Northern Boulevard station were originally also used at Queens Plaza, the next express station to the west, while a different tile color is used at Jackson Heights–Roosevelt Avenue, the next express station to the east. Purple tiles are similarly used at the other local stations between Queens Plaza and Roosevelt Avenue.

Dark teal I-beam columns run along both platforms at regular intervals, alternating ones having the standard black station name plate with white lettering. The I-beam piers are located every 15 feet (4.6 m) and support girders above the platforms. The roof girders are also connected to columns in the platform walls. The tunnel is covered by a U-shaped trough that contains utility pipes and wires. The outer walls of this trough are composed of columns, spaced approximately every 5 feet (1.5 m) with concrete infill between them. There is a 1-inch (25 mm) gap between the tunnel wall and the platform wall, which is made of 4-inch (100 mm)-thick brick covered over by a tiled finish. The columns between the tracks are also spaced every 5 feet (1.5 m), with no infill.

There are heavy columns across one part of the station, where the New York Connecting Railroad to the Hell Gate Bridge crosses over. There is an older style wooden token booth in the mezzanine of the uptown entrance.

In the western half of this station, the express tracks go underneath the local tracks to run along Northern Boulevard. A short distance east of here, the express tracks rise to the same level as the local tracks. To the south (geographical west) of this station, there was a single crossover connecting the two tracks. In May 2019, this crossover was removed as part of the communications-based train control installation on the IND Queens Boulevard Line, which entailed the removal of under-used interlocking towers such as the Northern Boulevard crossover.

There is an emergency exit at the western end of the northbound platform at this station, which leads to the D3 and D4 express tracks below.

=== Exits ===
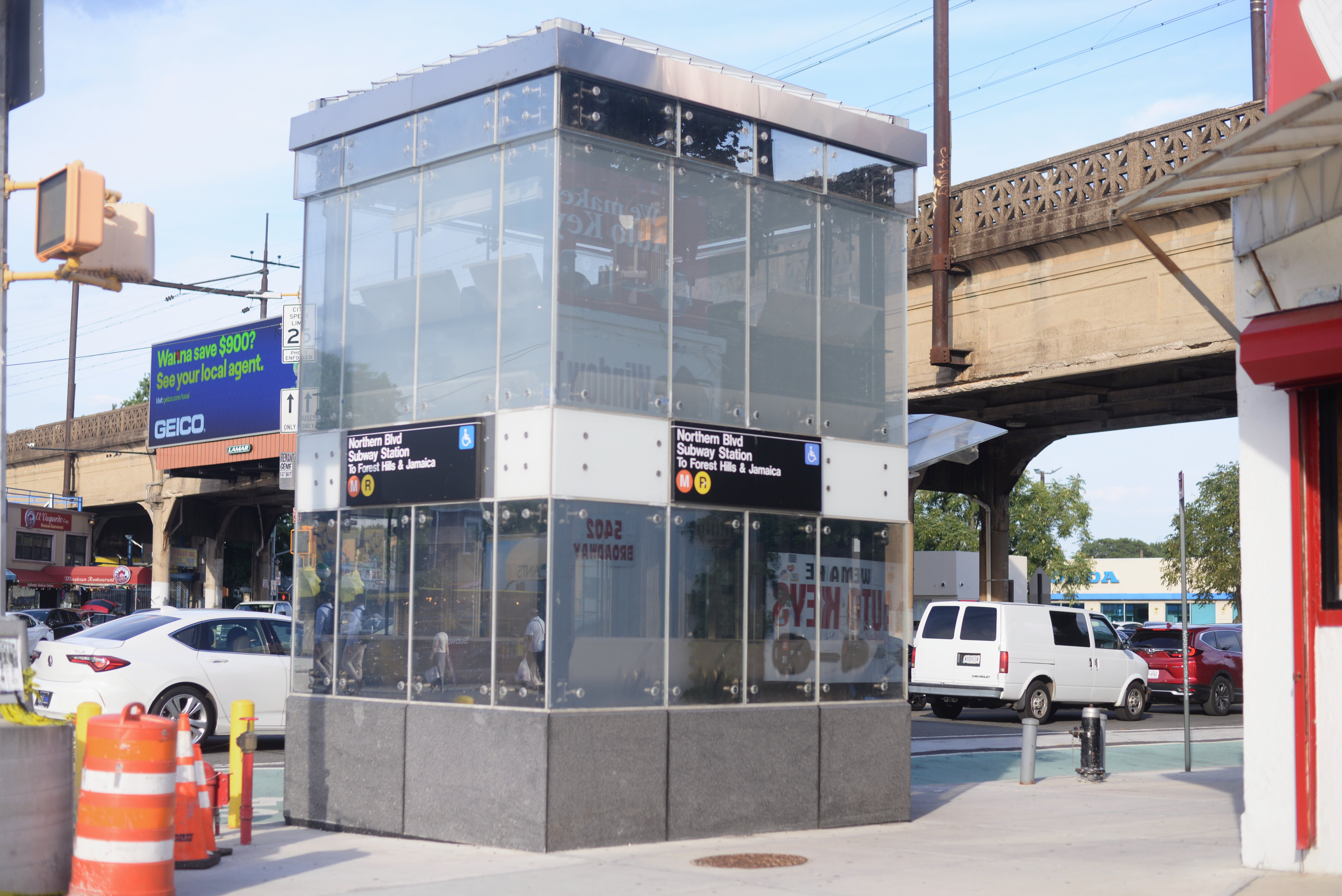
Southbound elevator entrance

The station's original exits are at the western end at Northern Boulevard and Broadway. Fare controls are at platform level and there are no crossovers or crossunders. The booth on the southbound side is full-time. Each fare control area has one street stair to the intersection of Broadway, 54th Street, and Northern Boulevard.

At the eastern end of the Manhattan-bound platform is a second exit to 56th Street and Broadway. It was reopened in August 2025 as part of the ADA accessibility improvements; it received an elevator.

An elevator leads up from the northbound platform to the southeastern corner of 54th Street and Broadway. Another elevator leads up from the southbound platform to the northeastern corner of 56th Street and Broadway.

The exits to 56th Street did not open with the rest of the station. The Woodside, Queens, Social Club urged the city Board of Transportation to open the entrance in 1935, and the Woodside Civic Association requested its opening in 1940. In 1945, Woodside residents appealed to the Board of Transportation to open the entrance; their petition was denied because the station only had 6,000 daily riders. Residents argued that the entrance should be open because many women had to walk through "a lonely section" to get home at night. The BOT deemed it uneconomical to open the exit.
