= 65th Street station (IND Queens Boulevard Line) =

New York City Subway station in Queens

65 Street
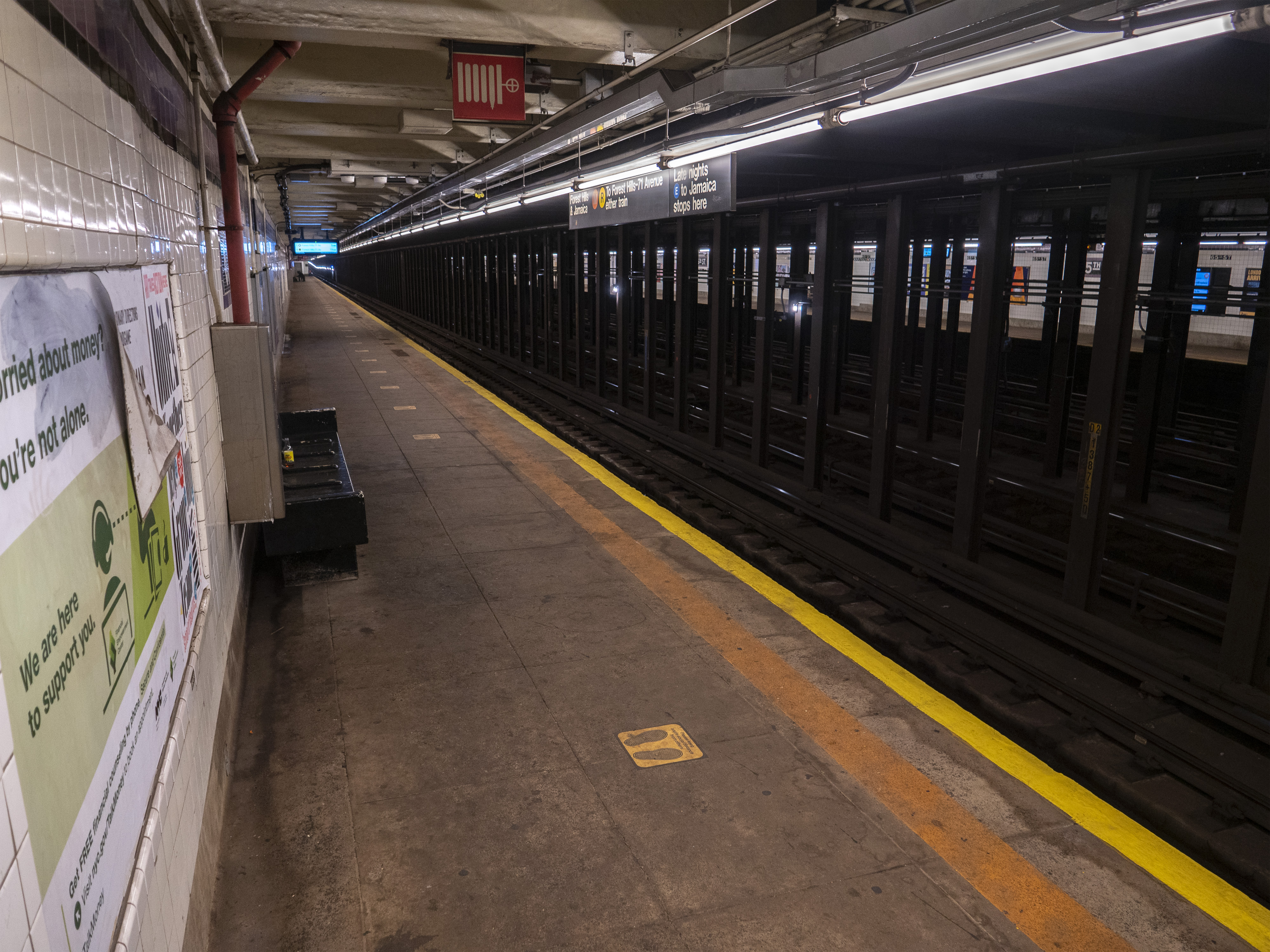
- View from northbound platform

Station statistics
- Address: 65th Street & Broadway; Queens, New York
- Borough: Queens
- Locale: Woodside
- Coordinates: 40.7494°N 73.8973°W
- Division: B (IND)
- Line: IND Queens Boulevard Line
- Services: E (late nights); F (late nights); M (weekdays during the day); R (all times except late nights)
- Structure: Underground
- Platforms: 2 side platforms
- Tracks: 4

Other information
- Opened: August 19, 1933; 93 years ago

Traffic
- 2025: 873,931 ▲13.7%
- Rank: 332 out of 423
Services
Preceding station	New York City Subway	Following station
Northern Boulevard E F M R via 36th Street	Local	Jackson Heights–Roosevelt Avenue E F M R toward Forest Hills–71st Avenue
does not stop here
Location
Location within New York City Subway
Location within New York City
Location within New York
Track layout
Street map
Station service legend
Symbol	Description
Stops all times except late nights	Stops all times except late nights
Stops late nights only	Stops late nights only
Stops weekdays during the day	Stops weekdays during the day

The 65th Street station is a local station on the IND Queens Boulevard Line of the New York City Subway, located at the intersection of 65th Street and Broadway in Queens. It is served by the M train on weekdays, and by the R train at all times except late nights, when the E and F trains take over service. The station opened on August 19, 1933, as part of the Independent Subway System's Queens Boulevard Line.

This station has no bus connections. The Q70 SBS bypasses the station without stopping.

== History ==
The Queens Boulevard Line was one of the first lines built by the city-owned Independent Subway System (IND), and stretches between the IND Eighth Avenue Line in Manhattan and 179th Street and Hillside Avenue in Jamaica, Queens. The Queens Boulevard Line was in part financed by a Public Works Administration (PWA) loan and grant of $25 million. One of the proposed stations would have been located at 65th Street.

The first section of the line, west from Roosevelt Avenue to 50th Street, opened on August 19, 1933. E trains ran local to Hudson Terminal (today's World Trade Center) in Manhattan, while the GG (predecessor to current G service) ran as a shuttle service between Queens Plaza and Nassau Avenue on the IND Crosstown Line.

== Station layout ==
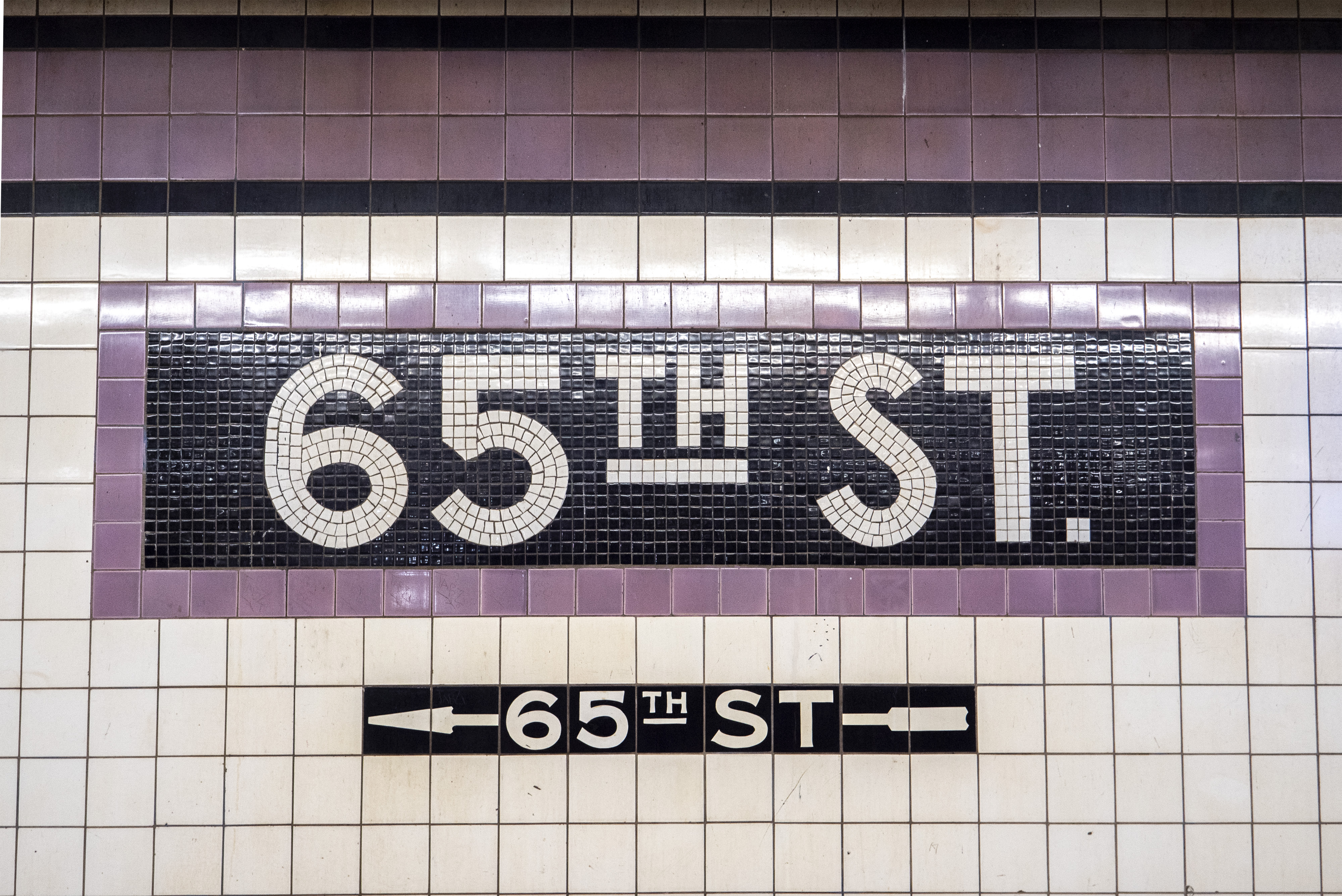
Mosaic name tablet

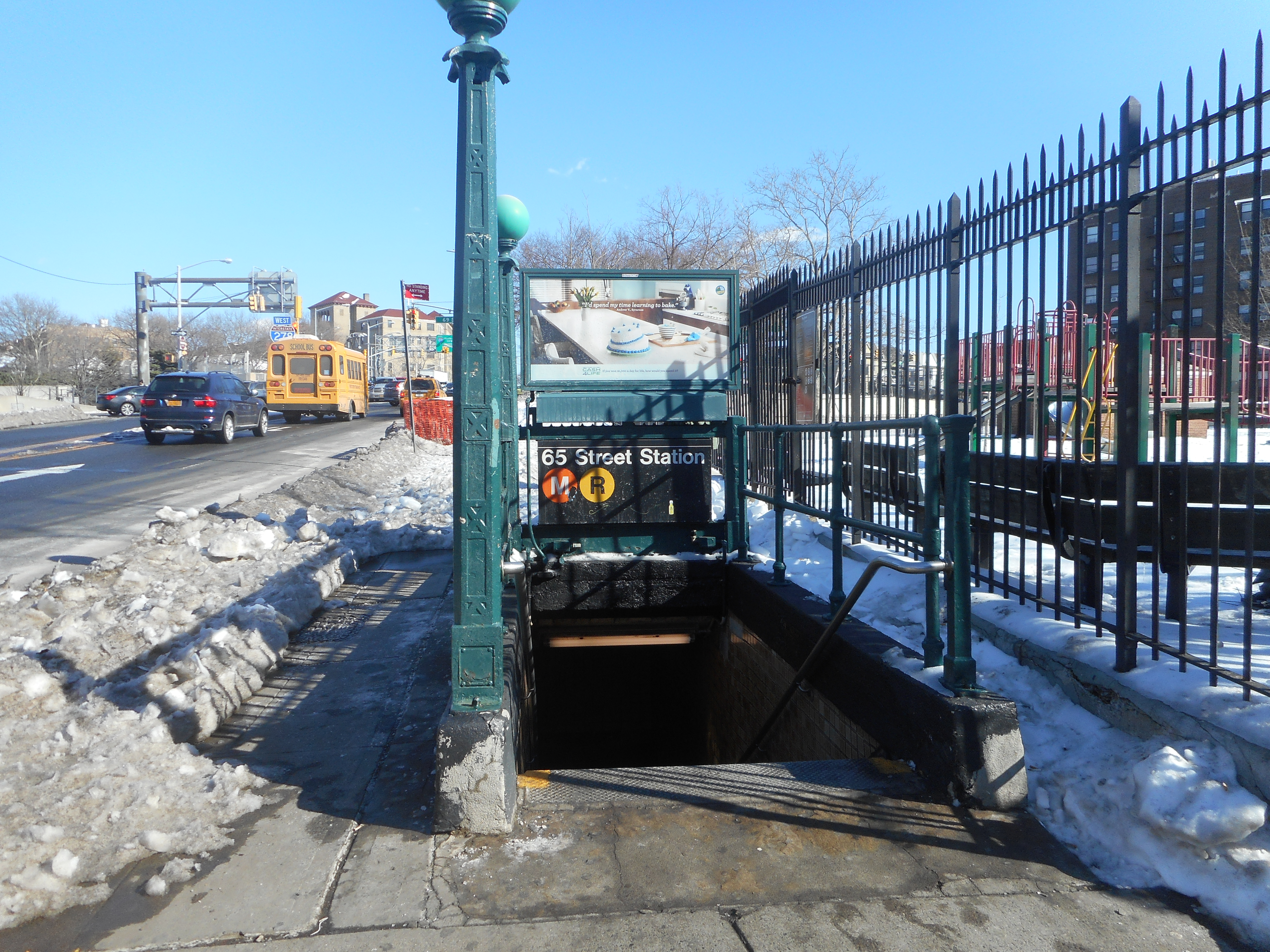
Southeast street stair

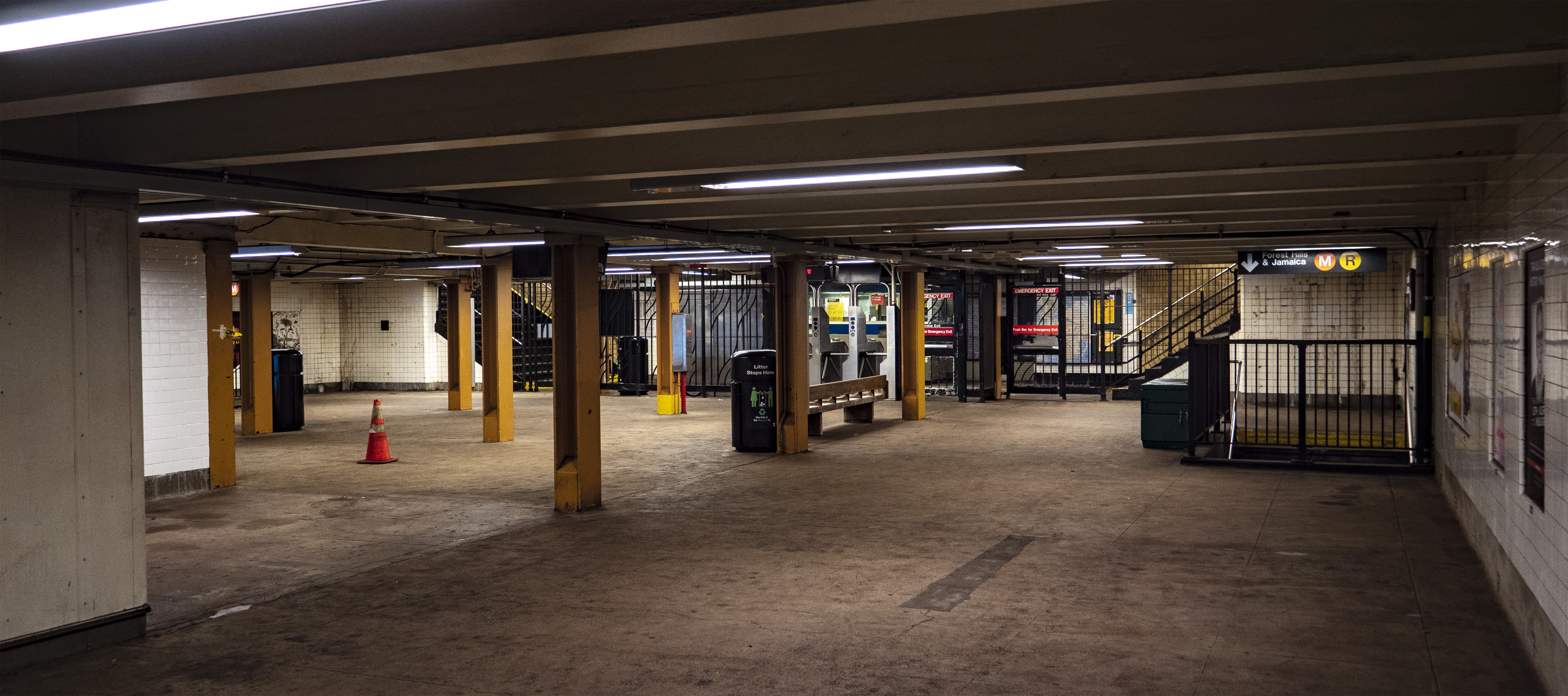
Mezzanine level

There are four tracks and two side platforms; the two center express tracks are used by the E and F trains at all times except late nights. The E and F trains serve the station at night, the M train serves the station on weekdays during the day, and the R train serves the station at all times except late nights. The station is between Northern Boulevard to the west and Jackson Heights–Roosevelt Avenue to the east.

Signs to the northbound platform are on the wall instead of hanging over the staircase. The reason for this was because the original 1933 IND tile sign read "Jamaica and Rockaway", anticipating construction of a never-built system expansion. These signs remained uncovered as late as 2001. The 1933 Manhattan-bound tile signs remain intact.

Both platforms are column-less, and their platform walls have a purple tile band with a black border, with a number of replacement tiles in different shades of violet and purple having been placed during repairs. There are also mosaic name tablets reading "65TH ST." in white sans-serif lettering on a black background and purple border. Small tile captions reading "65TH ST" in white lettering on black run below the trim line, and directional signs in the same style are present below some of the name tablets. The tile band was part of a color-coded tile system used throughout the IND. The tile colors were designed to facilitate navigation for travelers going away from Lower Manhattan. As such, the purple tiles used at the 65th Street station were originally also used at Queens Plaza, the next express station to the west, while a different tile color is used at Jackson Heights–Roosevelt Avenue, the next express station to the east. Purple tiles are similarly used at the other local stations between Queens Plaza and Roosevelt Avenue.

There are girders above the platforms, which are connected to columns in the walls adjoining each platform. The tunnel is covered by a U-shaped trough that contains utility pipes and wires. The outer walls of this trough are composed of columns, spaced approximately every 5 feet (1.5 m) with concrete infill between them. There is a 1-inch (25 mm) gap between the tunnel wall and the platform wall, which is made of 4-inch (100 mm)-thick brick covered over by a tiled finish. The columns between the tracks are also spaced every 5 feet (1.5 m), with no infill.

West of this station, the express tracks become depressed and break from the local tracks. The express tracks run underneath Northern Boulevard, while the local tracks continue under Broadway and then turn to Steinway Street before meeting up with the express trains underneath Northern and Steinway. The line was built in this fashion because Broadway and Steinway Street are too narrow to align four tracks side by side underneath them.

=== Exits ===
The full-time mezzanine at the eastern end has three staircases to each platform and two staircases to the street, one to either eastern corner of Broadway and 65th Street. Both sides had fare controls and former booths at platform levels at the far western end, at the opposite end of the current mezzanine. They have since been sealed. Signs at the northeast exit as well as the Manhattan-bound platforms are for Rowan Street, the former name of 65th Street.
