= Steinway Street station =

New York City Subway station in Queens

Steinway Street
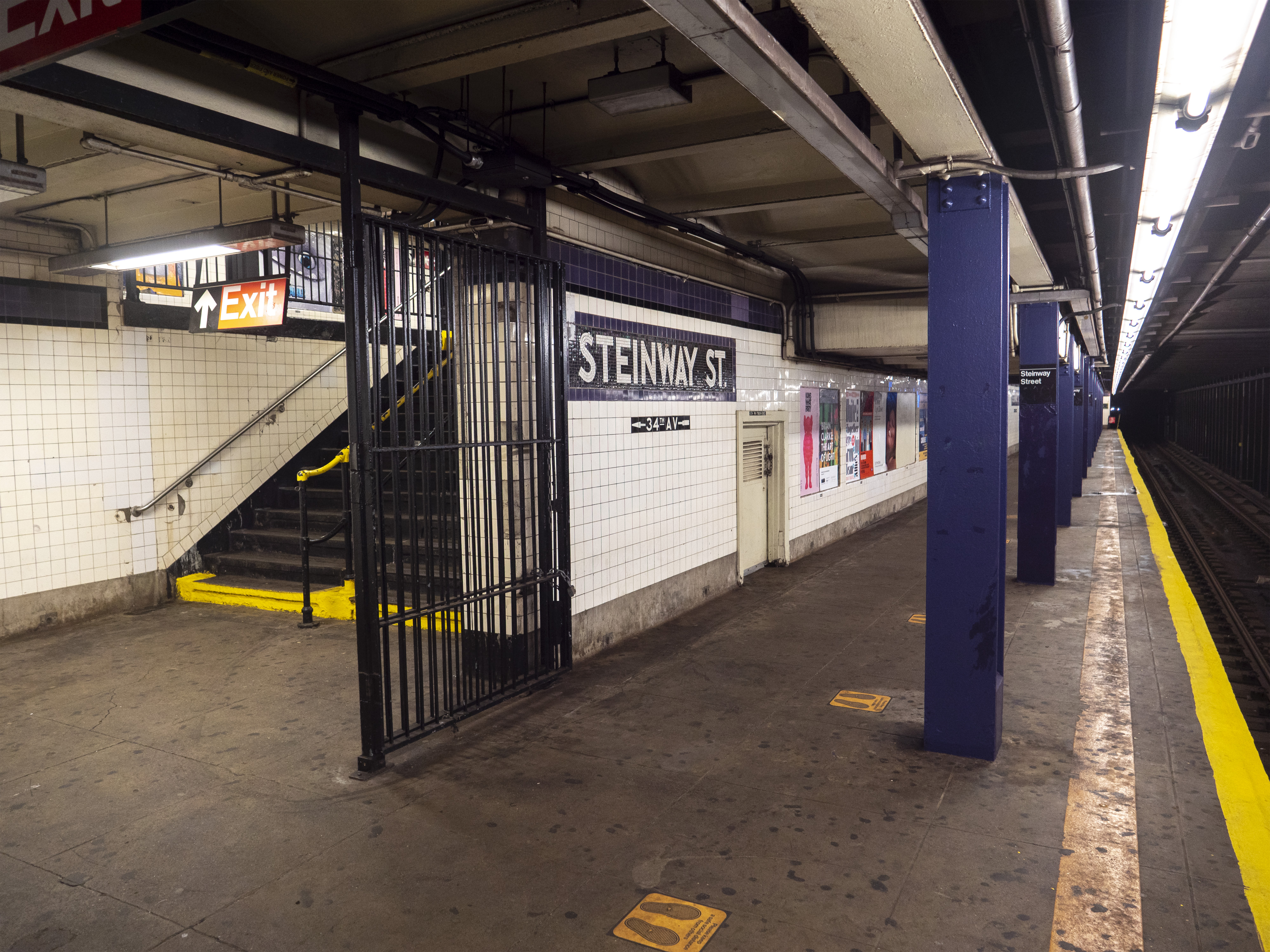
- 34th Avenue exit stairs on northbound platform

Station statistics
- Address: Steinway Street & Broadway; Queens, New York
- Borough: Queens
- Locale: Astoria
- Coordinates: 40.758668°N 73.918934°W
- Division: B (IND)
- Line: IND Queens Boulevard Line
- Services: E (late nights); F (late nights); M (weekdays during the day); R (all times except late nights)
- Transit: MTA Bus: Q66, Q101, Q104
- Structure: Underground
- Platforms: 2 side platforms
- Tracks: 2

Other information
- Opened: August 19, 1933; 93 years ago
- Accessible: No; under construction

Traffic
- 2025: 2,971,603 ▲3.5%
- Rank: 129 out of 423
Services
| Preceding station | New York City Subway | Following station |
|---|---|---|
| 36th Street E F M R service splits | Local | 46th Street E F M R toward Forest Hills–71st Avenue |
Location
Location within New York City Subway
Location within New York City
Location within New York
Track layout
Street map
Station service legend
| Symbol | Description |
| Stops all times except late nights | Stops all times except late nights |
| Stops late nights only | Stops late nights only |
| Stops weekdays during the day | Stops weekdays during the day |

The Steinway Street station is a local station on the IND Queens Boulevard Line of the New York City Subway. Located under Steinway Street between Broadway and 34th Avenue, it is served by the M train on weekdays, and by the R train at all times except late nights, when the E and F trains take over service.

== History ==
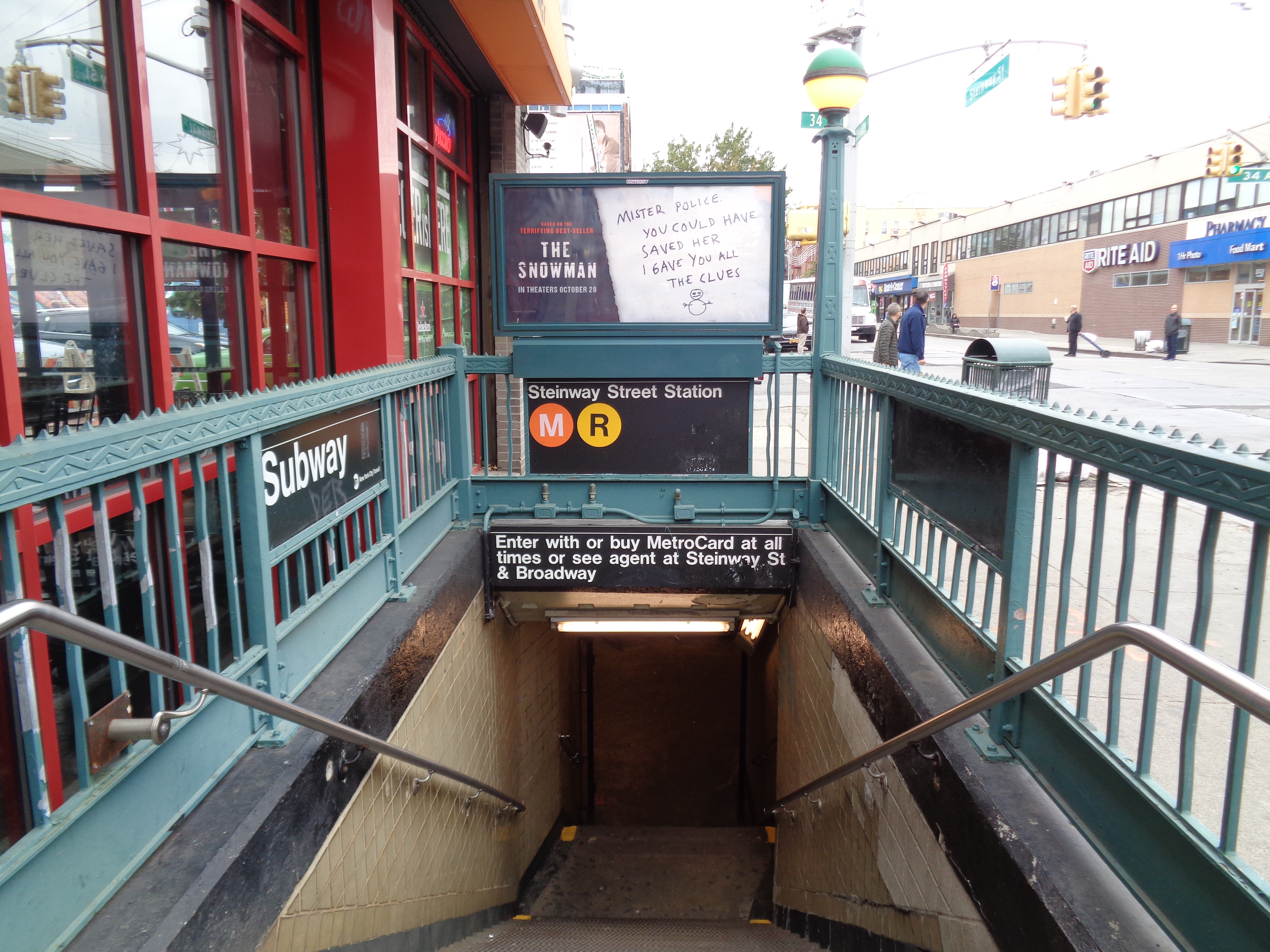
Entrance at the southwestern corner of 34th Avenue and Steinway Street

The Queens Boulevard Line was one of the first lines built by the city-owned Independent Subway System (IND), and stretches between the IND Eighth Avenue Line in Manhattan and 179th Street and Hillside Avenue in Jamaica, Queens. The Queens Boulevard Line was in part financed by a Public Works Administration (PWA) loan and grant of $25 million. One of the proposed stations would have been located at Steinway Street.

The first section of the line, west from Roosevelt Avenue to 50th Street, opened on August 19, 1933. E trains ran local to Hudson Terminal (today's World Trade Center) in Manhattan, while the GG (predecessor to current G service) ran as a shuttle service between Queens Plaza and Nassau Avenue on the IND Crosstown Line.

In 2019, as part of an initiative to increase the accessibility of the New York City Subway system, the MTA announced that it would install elevators at the Steinway Street station as part of the MTA's 2020–2024 Capital Program. In November 2022, the MTA announced that it would award a $965 million contract for the installation of 21 elevators across eight stations, including Steinway Street. A joint venture of ASTM and Halmar International would construct the elevators under a public-private partnership. In April 2026, an MTA official said that major construction will be complete by the end of 2026.

== Station layout ==
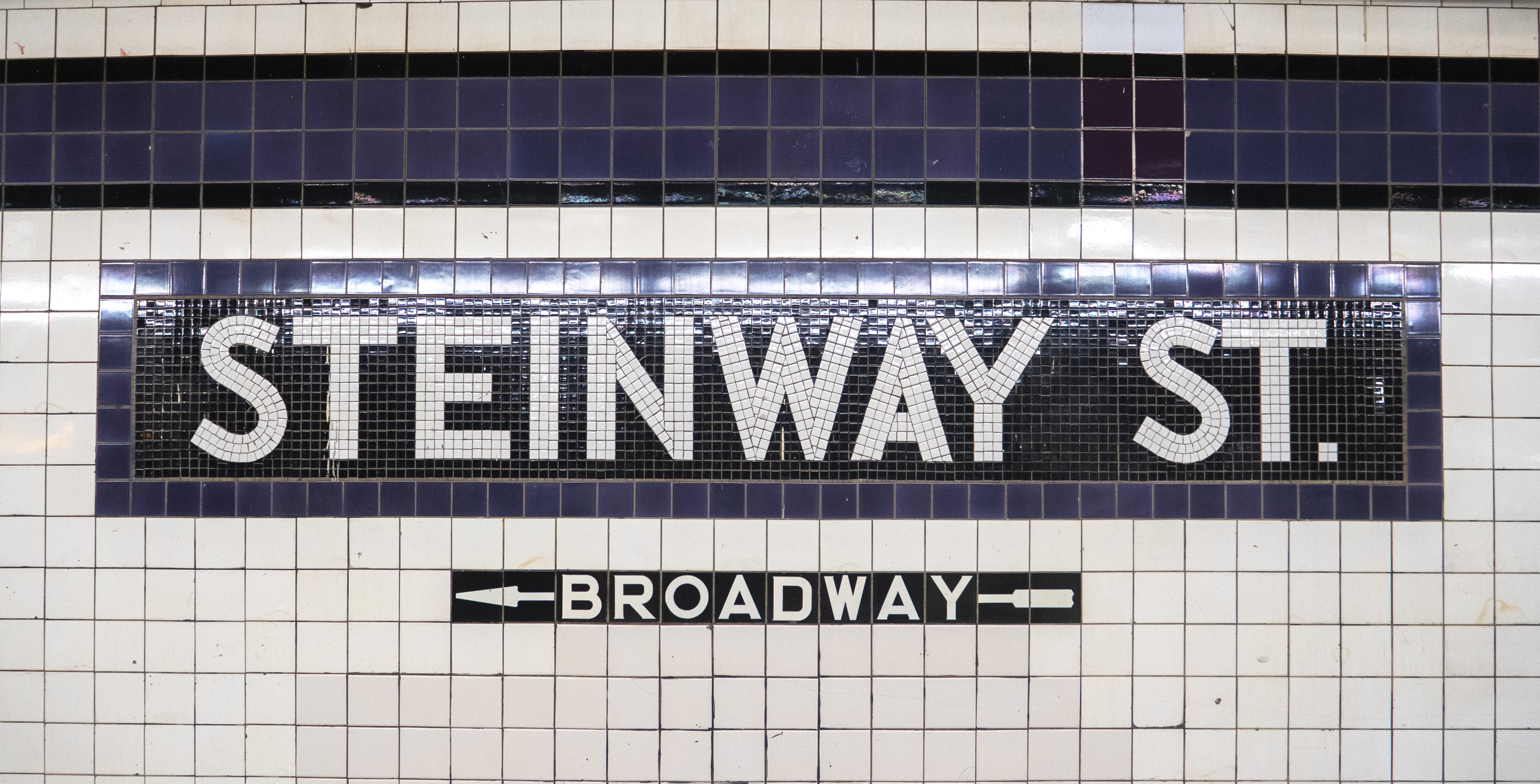
Mosaic name tablet

This underground station has two tracks and two side platforms. The E and F trains serve the station at night, the M train serves the station on weekdays during the day, and the R train serves the station at all times except late nights. The station is between 36th Street to the west and 46th Street to the east.

Both platform walls have a purple tile band with a black border and mosaic name tablets reading "STEINWAY ST." in white sans-serif lettering on a black background and purple border. Small tile captions reading "STEINWAY" in white on black run below the tile band, and directional signs in the same style are present under some of the name tablets. The tile band was part of a color-coded tile system used throughout the IND. The tile colors were designed to facilitate navigation for travelers going away from Lower Manhattan. As such, the purple tiles used at the Steinway Street station were originally also used at Queens Plaza, the next express station to the west, while a different tile color is used at Jackson Heights–Roosevelt Avenue, the next express station to the east. Purple tiles are similarly used at the other local stations between Queens Plaza and Roosevelt Avenue.

Royal purple I-beam columns run along both platforms at regular intervals, alternating ones having the standard black station name plate with white lettering. The I-beam piers are located every 15 feet (4.6 m) and support girders above the platforms. The roof girders are also connected to columns in the platform walls. The tunnel is covered by a U-shaped trough that contains utility pipes and wires. The outer walls of this trough are composed of columns, spaced approximately every 5 feet (1.5 m) with concrete infill between them. There is a 1-inch (25 mm) gap between the tunnel wall and the platform wall, which is made of 4-inch (100 mm)-thick brick covered over by a tiled finish. The columns between the tracks are also spaced every 5 feet (1.5 m), with no infill.

South of this station, the express tracks rejoin the local tracks and the line becomes four tracks again.

=== Exits ===
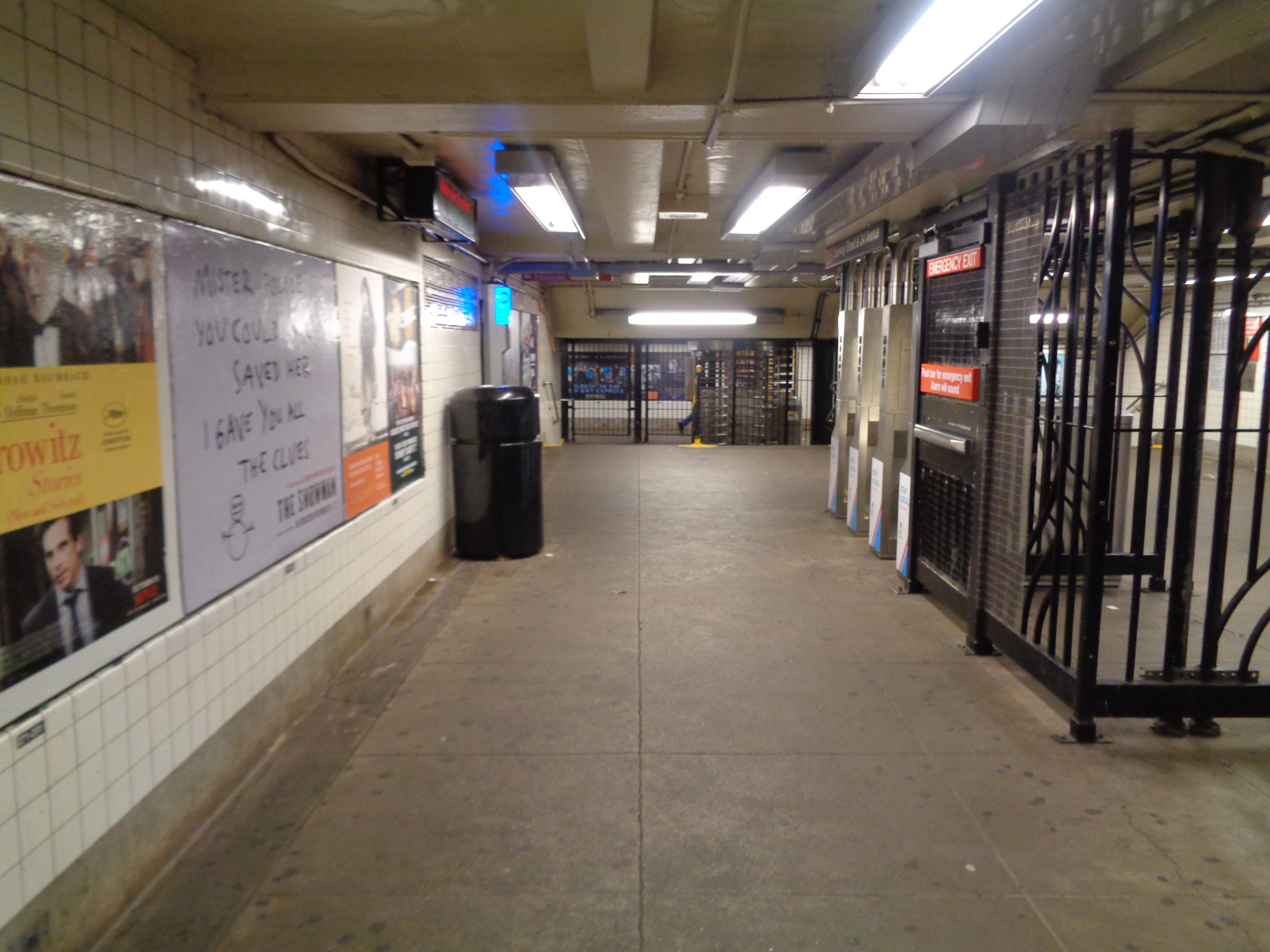
Southern station mezzanine

There are two separate mezzanines, one at each end of the station, and crossover is allowed on both of them. The side on Steinway Street near Broadway has two street stairs and has a token booth; this used to be the only full-time fare control area. This mezzanine has two small staircases to the southbound side and a single platform-wide staircase on the northbound side. The former part-time fare control area at 34th Avenue and Steinway Street—since converted to a secondary full-time fare control area—currently has no booth (it had been completely dismantled for asbestos abatement), and is HEET turnstile access at all times. This side has two stairs to the street to the northeast and southwest corners, and one to each platform.

In 2003, the hours for this token booth were 6:10 a.m. to 1:45 p.m. Mondays through Saturdays. The entrances on this side, at the time, were only open 6:10 a.m. to 11:30 a.m. Mondays through Fridays, 6:10 a.m. to 12:00 a.m. Saturdays, and 4:20 a.m. to 12:00 a.m. Sundays. In 2009, the MTA proposed closing the part-time booth, which was then open 6:10 a.m. to 1:30 p.m. Mondays through Saturdays. Access to this entrance has been added through HEET access between 2003 and 2009.
