= Forest Hills–71st Avenue station =

New York City Subway station in Queens

Forest Hills–71 Avenue
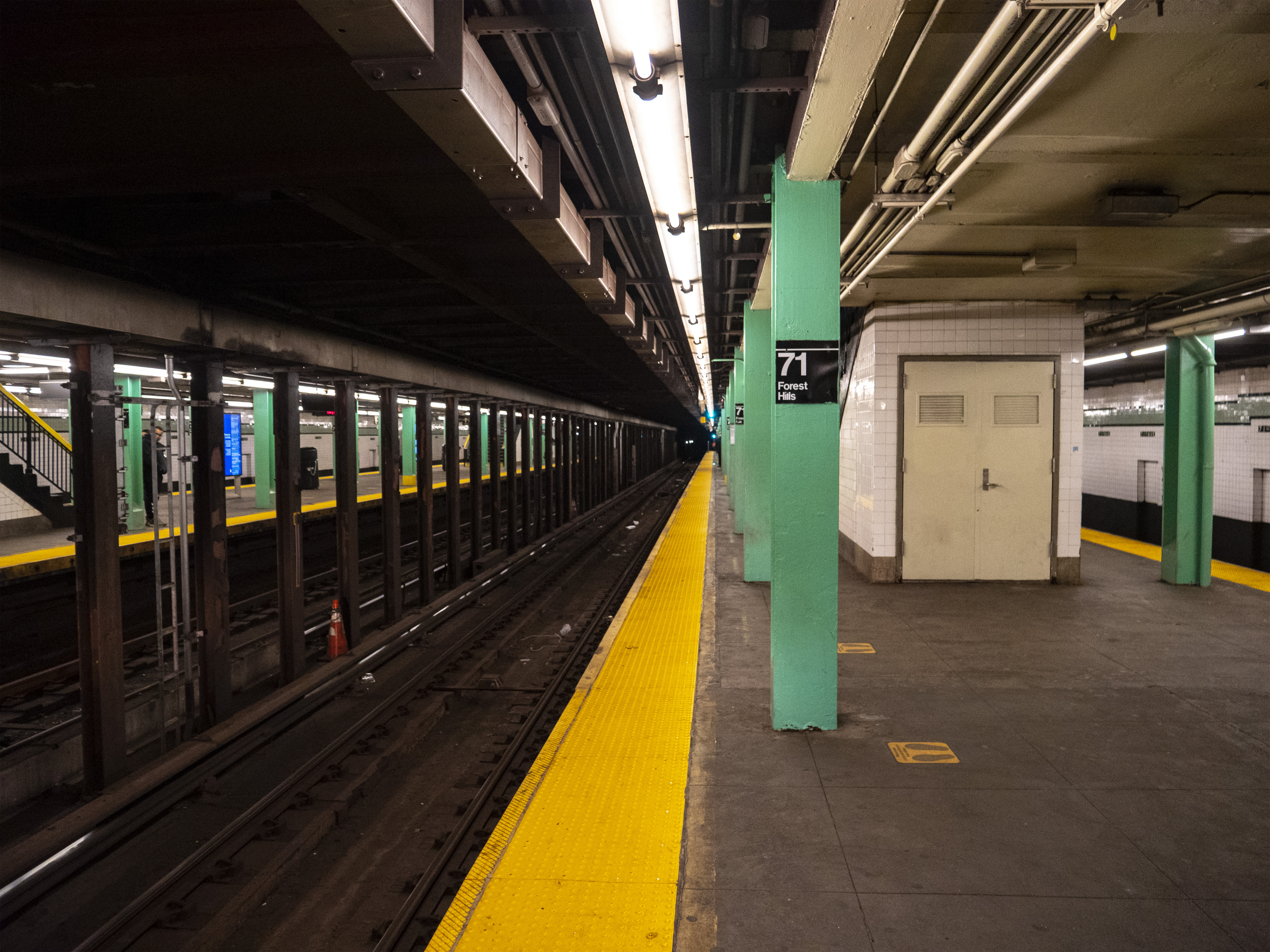
- View down southbound express track

Station statistics
- Address: 71st Avenue & Queens Boulevard; Forest Hills, New York
- Borough: Queens
- Locale: Forest Hills
- Coordinates: 40.721404°N 73.844004°W
- Division: B (IND)
- Line: IND Queens Boulevard Line
- Services: E (all times); F (all times) <F> (two rush hour trains, peak direction); M (weekdays during the day); R (all times except late nights)
- Transit: MTA Bus: Q23, Q60, Q64, Q74, QM4, QM11, QM12, QM18, QM42, QM44; LIRR Forest Hills station (not announced on trains)
- Structure: Underground
- Platforms: 2 island platforms cross-platform interchange
- Tracks: 4

Other information
- Opened: December 31, 1936; 89 years ago
- Accessible: Yes
- Former/other names: 71st–Continental Avenues–Forest Hills

Traffic
- 2025: 6,118,632 ▲7.6%
- Rank: 46 out of 423
Services
Preceding station	New York City Subway	Following station
Jackson Heights–Roosevelt Avenue E F <F> westbound	Express	Kew Gardens–Union Turnpike E toward Jamaica Center–York College
Jackson Heights–Roosevelt Avenue E F <F> westbound	F (New York City Subway service)	75th Avenue E F <F> toward Jamaica–179th Street
67th Avenue E F M R via 36th Street	Local	Terminus
Non-revenue services and lines
Preceding station	New York City Subway	Following station
	no service	World's Fair demolished
Location
Location within New York City Subway
Location within New York City
Location within New York
Track layout
Street map
Station service legend
Symbol	Description
Stops all times except late nights	Stops all times except late nights
Stops all times	Stops all times
Stops late nights only	Stops late nights only
Stops weekdays during the day	Stops weekdays during the day
Stops rush hours in the peak direction only (limited service)	Stops rush hours in the peak direction only (limited service)
Stops late nights and weekends	Stops late nights and weekends

The Forest Hills–71st Avenue station (previously known as the 71st–Continental Avenue station) is an express station on the IND Queens Boulevard Line of the New York City Subway, located on Queens Boulevard at 71st (Continental) Avenue in Forest Hills, Queens. It is served by the E and F trains at all times, the <F> train during rush hours in the reverse peak direction, the M train on weekdays during the day, and the R train at all times except late nights. It serves as the northern terminus for the M and R services.

== History ==
The Queens Boulevard Line was one of the first lines built by the city-owned Independent Subway System (IND), and stretches between the IND Eighth Avenue Line in Manhattan and 179th Street and Hillside Avenue in Jamaica, Queens. One of the proposed stations would have been located at 71st Avenue. During the late 1920s, in anticipation of the arrival of the subway, land was bought by developers and was built up. Zoning laws were changed to allow fifteen-story apartment buildings to be built, and made the neighborhood of Forest Hills a more desirable place to live, especially as it was an express stop. Queens Borough President George Harvey predicted that the introduction of the subway to Forest Hills would turn Queens Boulevard into the "Park Avenue of Queens."

The first section of the line opened on August 19, 1933 from the connection to the Eighth Avenue Line at 50th Street to Roosevelt Avenue in Jackson Heights. Later that year, a $23 million loan was approved to finance the remainder of the line, along with other IND lines. The remainder of the line was built by the Public Works Administration. In 1934 and 1935, construction of the extension to Jamaica was suspended for 15 months and was halted by strikes. Construction was further delayed due to a strike in 1935, instigated by electricians opposing wages paid by the General Railway Signal Company. By August 1935, work had resumed on the 71st Avenue station and three other stations on the Queens Boulevard Line. In August 1936, tracks were installed all the way to 178th Street, and the stations to Union Turnpike were completed.

On December 31, 1936, the IND Queens Boulevard Line was extended by eight stops, and 3.5 miles (5.6 km), from its previous terminus at Roosevelt Avenue to Union Turnpike, and the 71st Avenue station opened as part of this extension. As a result of the extension, areas in Elmhurst were accessible by subway. The E train, which initially served all stops on the new extension, began making express stops in April 1937, and local GG trains began serving the extension at the time.

The station was proposed as a transfer station between the never-built Queens Super-Express Bypass as part of the 1968 Program for Action, which would have significantly expanded railway and subway service in the five boroughs. Under a 1984 plan, the new express station would have been one of three stops on the 63rd Street Line extension east of 21st Street–Queensbridge, the other two stops being at Northern Boulevard and Woodside. The bypass station would have had a mezzanine, two platform levels (an upper platform for Jamaica and Southeast Queens-bound trains; a lower platform for Manhattan-bound trains), a new elevator entrance, and an expanded mezzanine, with escalators and stairs connecting the new platform levels to the existing platforms. The new station would have been built on the south side of Queens Boulevard, south of the existing station.

In 1976, weekday N service was extended north over the 60th Street Tunnel Connection to Forest Hills–71st Avenue to replace the discontinued EE route, which until then had run from 71st Avenue to Whitehall Street in Manhattan. In 1987, the N and R routes swapped northern terminals, and the R began running to 71st Avenue. The Forest Hills–71st Avenue station was the northern terminus for all G trains until December 2001, when the V train began running; afterward, the G train only stopped there on weekends and at night. Both the G and V trains stopped serving the station in 2010, when the M train began serving the Queens Boulevard Line.

In 2014, the Metropolitan Transportation Authority built a new signal tower for the Manhattan-bound platform. The agency also upgraded the station to compliance with the 1990 Americans With Disabilities Act; the upgrade included passenger elevators to serve the street level, mezzanine and platforms. This project was completed by March 2014 after a three-month delay. However, a ribbon-cutting for the new elevators was not held until May 15, 2014. The MTA announced in 2024 that it would replace the station's existing waist-high turnstiles with taller, wide-aisle turnstiles. In April 2025, the MTA announced plans to install taller fare gates with glass panels at 20 stations, including the Forest Hills–71st Avenue station. The fare gates would be manufactured by Cubic Transportation Systems, Conduent, Scheidt & Bachmann, and STraffic as part of a pilot program to reduce fare evasion. The new fare gates were not installed immediately; in October 2026, the MTA announced plans to install taller fare gates with glass panels at 20 additional stations, including the Forest Hills–71st Avenue station, after the gates had been successfully piloted at earlier stations.

== Station layout ==
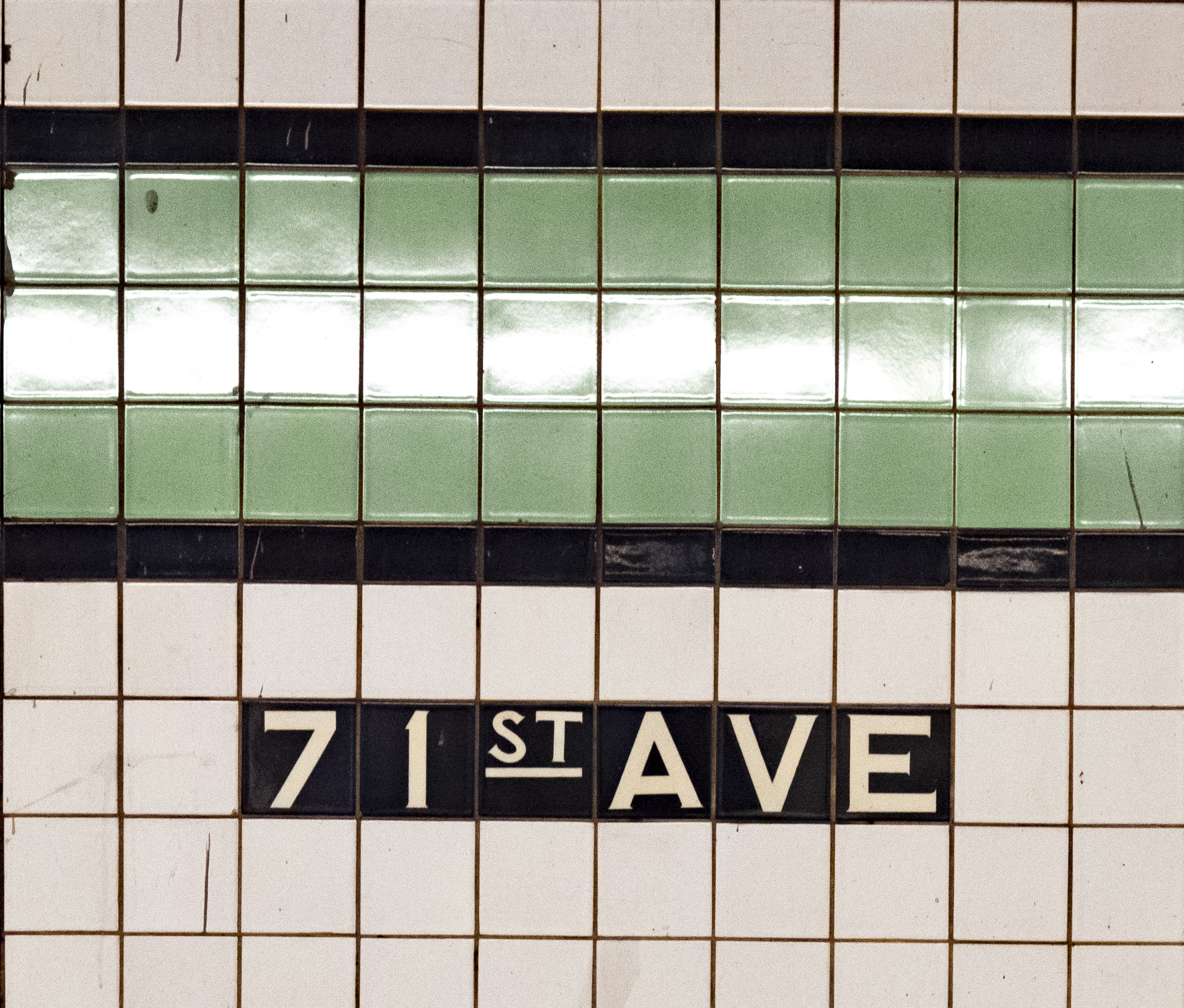
Track wall tile band and caption

The station has four tracks and two island platforms. The E and F both stop here at all times, running on the express tracks during the day and on the local tracks at night. The R stops here except at night and the M stops here only on weekdays during the day. The M and R both run on the local tracks and the station serves as their northern terminus. The next stop to the west (railroad south) is 67th Avenue for local trains and Jackson Heights–Roosevelt Avenue for express trains. The next stop to the east (railroad north) is 75th Avenue for local E and F trains and Kew Gardens–Union Turnpike for express E trains.

To the east, the line widens to six tracks, with two tracks starting between the local and express tracks in each direction, then ramping down to a lower level, where they widen to four tracks and run under the 75th Avenue station to Jamaica Yard. M and R trains discharge their passengers on the northbound platform and proceed to one of the innermost two tracks to relay and return southbound to recruit their passengers. F trains during the day and E trains on weekdays during the evening and on weekends during the day switch from the express track to the local track east of the station. This station has four punch boxes: two each at the eastern end and western end.

Both outer track walls have a light Fern green tile band with a black border and small "71st AVE" tile captions below them in white lettering on a black background. The tile band is part of a color-coded tile system used throughout the IND. The tile colors were designed to facilitate navigation for travelers going away from Lower Manhattan. As such, a different tile color is used at Kew Gardens–Union Turnpike, the next express station to the east. The green tiles used at the 71st Avenue station were also used at 75th Avenue, the only local station between 71st Avenue and Union Turnpike.

The station's I-beam columns are painted emerald green with signs reading "71 – Forest Hills", while older signs on the black columns between the express tracks read "CONTINENTAL AVENUE – Forest Hills" in black lettering on a white background.

=== Exits ===
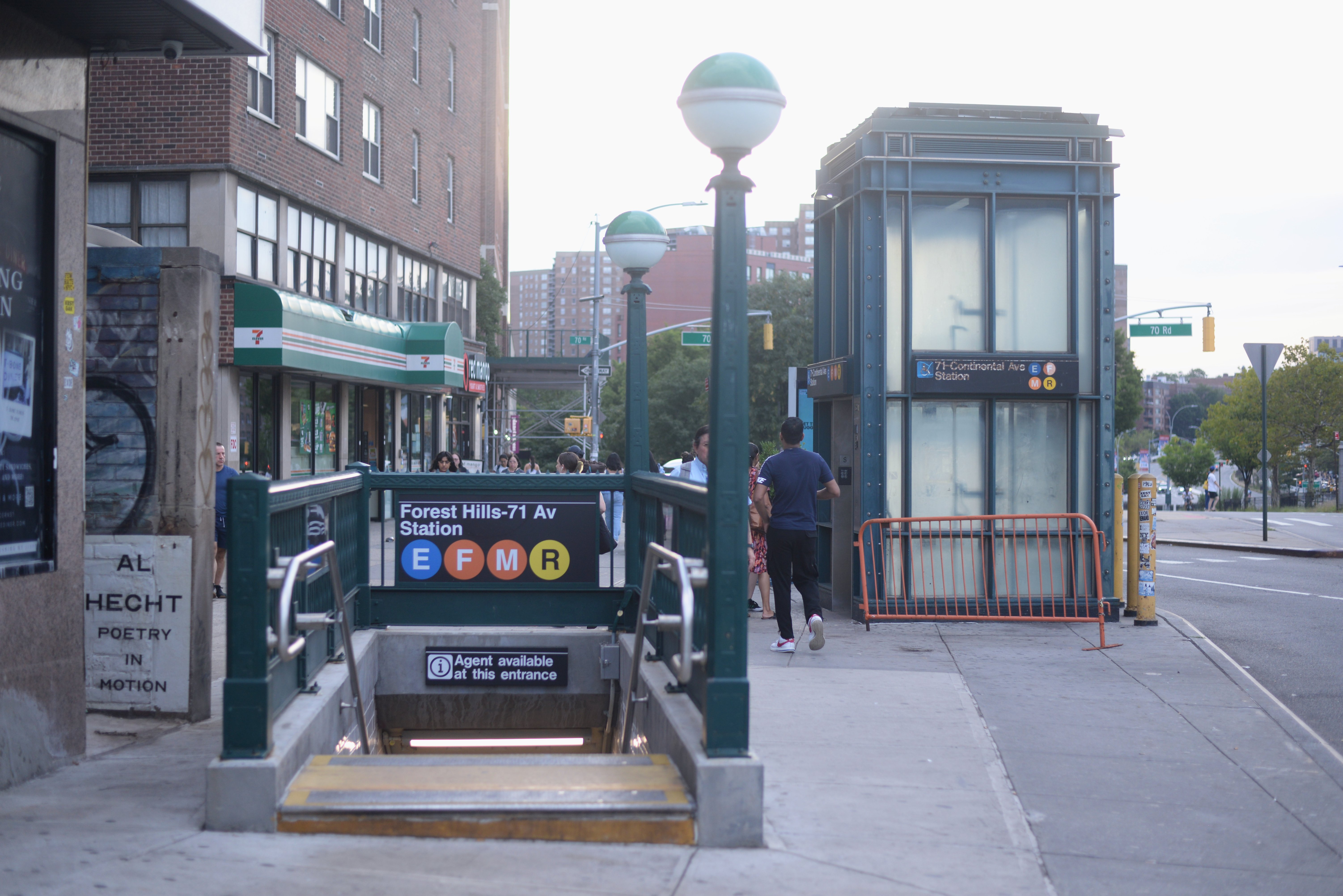
Southern station entrances. The old signage, for 71st–Continental Avenue, is visible on the elevator.

There are two fare control areas on the full width mezzanine above the platforms and tracks. The western section of the mezzanine is bounded on the west by the exit to the western side of 70th Road and the northern side of Queens Boulevard. There used to be a part-time booth at this location. On the east end, the fare control area is sided by a passageway out of fare control connecting the exits between 70th Road and 71st Avenue. There used to be a part-time booth at the northern section of the passageway. An elevator is located at the southern exit between 70th Road and 71st Avenue and makes the station ADA-accessible. The second fare control area is in between the aforementioned fare free passageway and the passageways connecting to the exits at 71st Avenue. At the eastern end of the mezzanine there is a staircase leading to Queens Boulevard between 71st Avenue and 71st Road on the northern side, and a staircase leading to the intersection of 71st Avenue and Queens Boulevard on the south side. There are seven staircases to each platform.

== Signage ==
On the current MTA map and published timetables, the station name is "Forest Hills–71st Avenue." In the past, "Continental Avenue" (the alternative name of 71st Avenue used in nearby Forest Hills Gardens) has been included in the name and is used on the rollsigns of older rolling stock such as the R32. As of 2011, the platform signage reads 71–Continental Av–Forest Hills.

== Points of interest ==
Nearby points of interest include:

- Austin Street, a major business thoroughfare in Forest Hills, located south of the station.
- Forest Hills LIRR station, located in Station Square in Forest Hills Gardens at Burns Street.
- Ridgewood Savings Bank, Forest Hills Branch, designated a landmark by the New York City Landmarks Preservation Commission since 2000.
- West Side Tennis Club, containing Forest Hills Stadium, which hosted the US Open tennis tournament until 1977.
