= 36th Street station (IND Queens Boulevard Line) =

New York City Subway station in Queens

36 Street
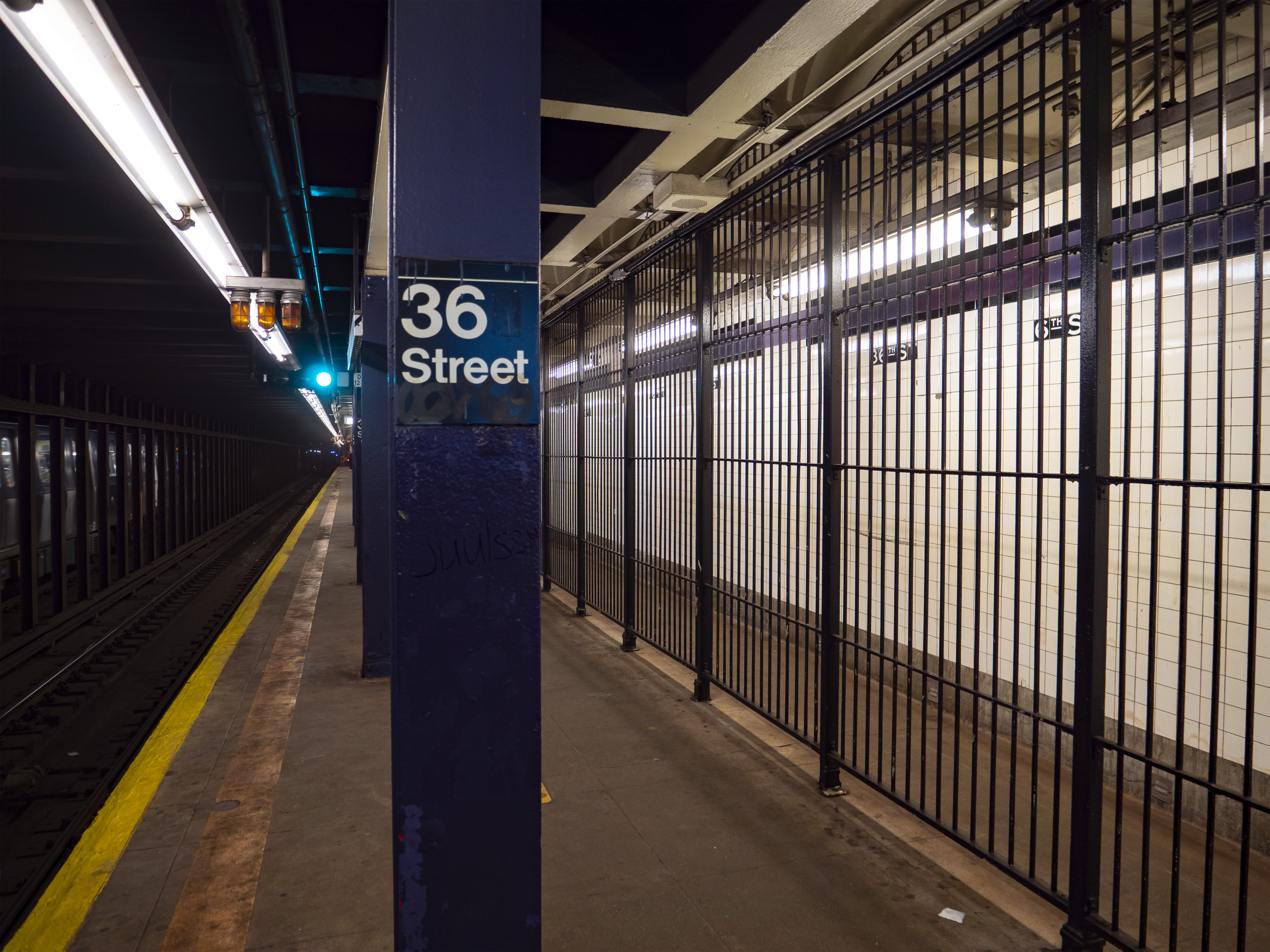
- View of southbound platform

Station statistics
- Address: 36th Street & Northern Boulevard; Queens, New York
- Borough: Queens
- Locale: Long Island City
- Coordinates: 40.752036°N 73.927903°W
- Division: B (IND)
- Line: IND Queens Boulevard Line
- Services: E (late nights); F (late nights); M (weekdays during the day); R (all times except late nights)
- Transit: MTA Bus: Q63, Q101
- Structure: Underground
- Platforms: 2 side platforms
- Tracks: 4

Other information
- Opened: August 19, 1933; 93 years ago

Traffic
- 2025: 832,981 ▲8.6%
- Rank: 337 out of 423
Services
Preceding station	New York City Subway	Following station
21st Street–Queensbridge F M toward Middle Village–Metropolitan Avenue	M (New York City Subway service)	Steinway Street E F M R toward Forest Hills–71st Avenue
Queens Plaza toward Bay Ridge–95th Street	Local	Steinway Street E F M R toward Forest Hills–71st Avenue
Location
Location within New York City Subway
Location within New York City
Location within New York
Track layout
Street map
Station service legend
Symbol	Description
Stops all times except late nights	Stops all times except late nights
Stops late nights only	Stops late nights only
Stops weekdays during the day	Stops weekdays during the day

The 36th Street station is a local station on the IND Queens Boulevard Line of the New York City Subway. Located at the intersection of 36th Street and Northern Boulevard in Queens, it is served by the M train on weekdays, and by the R train at all times except late nights, when the E and F trains take over service.

== History ==
The Queens Boulevard Line was one of the first lines built by the city-owned Independent Subway System (IND), and stretches between the IND Eighth Avenue Line in Manhattan and 179th Street and Hillside Avenue in Jamaica, Queens. The Queens Boulevard Line was in part financed by a Public Works Administration (PWA) loan and grant of $25 million. One of the proposed stations would have been located at 36th Street.

The first section of the line, west from Roosevelt Avenue to 50th Street, opened on August 19, 1933. E trains ran local to Hudson Terminal (today's World Trade Center) in Manhattan, while the GG (predecessor to current G service) ran as a shuttle service between Queens Plaza and Nassau Avenue on the IND Crosstown Line.

The station's northbound platform was temporarily closed in June 2023 for structural improvements.

== Station layout ==
This underground station has four tracks and two side platforms. The station is served by the R except at night, the M only on weekdays during the day, and by the E and F during the night. The E and F use the two center express tracks to bypass this station during the day. The next stop to the west is Queens Plaza for R and nighttime E trains, and 21st Street–Queensbridge for M and nighttime F trains. The next stop to the east is Steinway Street.

The station's tile band is purple with a black border and name tablets have "36TH ST." in white lettering on a black background and purple border. Small directional and name signs are tiled in white lettering on a black background under the tile band and name tablets. The tile band was part of a color-coded tile system used throughout the IND. The tile colors were designed to facilitate navigation for travelers going away from Lower Manhattan. As such, the purple tiles used at the 36th Street station were originally also used at Queens Plaza, the next express station to the west, while a different tile color is used at Jackson Heights–Roosevelt Avenue, the next express station to the east. Purple tiles are similarly used at the other local stations between Queens Plaza and Roosevelt Avenue.

Both platforms have royal purple I-beam columns at regular intervals with every other one having the standard black station sign plate with white lettering. The I-beam piers are located every 15 feet (4.6 m) and support girders above the platforms. The roof girders are also connected to columns in the platform walls. The tunnel is covered by a U-shaped trough that contains utility pipes and wires. The outer walls of this trough are composed of columns, spaced approximately every 5 feet (1.5 m) with concrete infill between them. There is a 1-inch (25 mm) gap between the tunnel wall and the platform wall, which is made of 4-inch (100 mm)-thick brick covered over by a tiled finish. The columns between the tracks are also spaced every 5 feet (1.5 m), with no infill.

This is one of two stations on the R route that is named "36th Street"; the other is 36th Street on the BMT Fourth Avenue Line in Brooklyn.

=== Exits ===
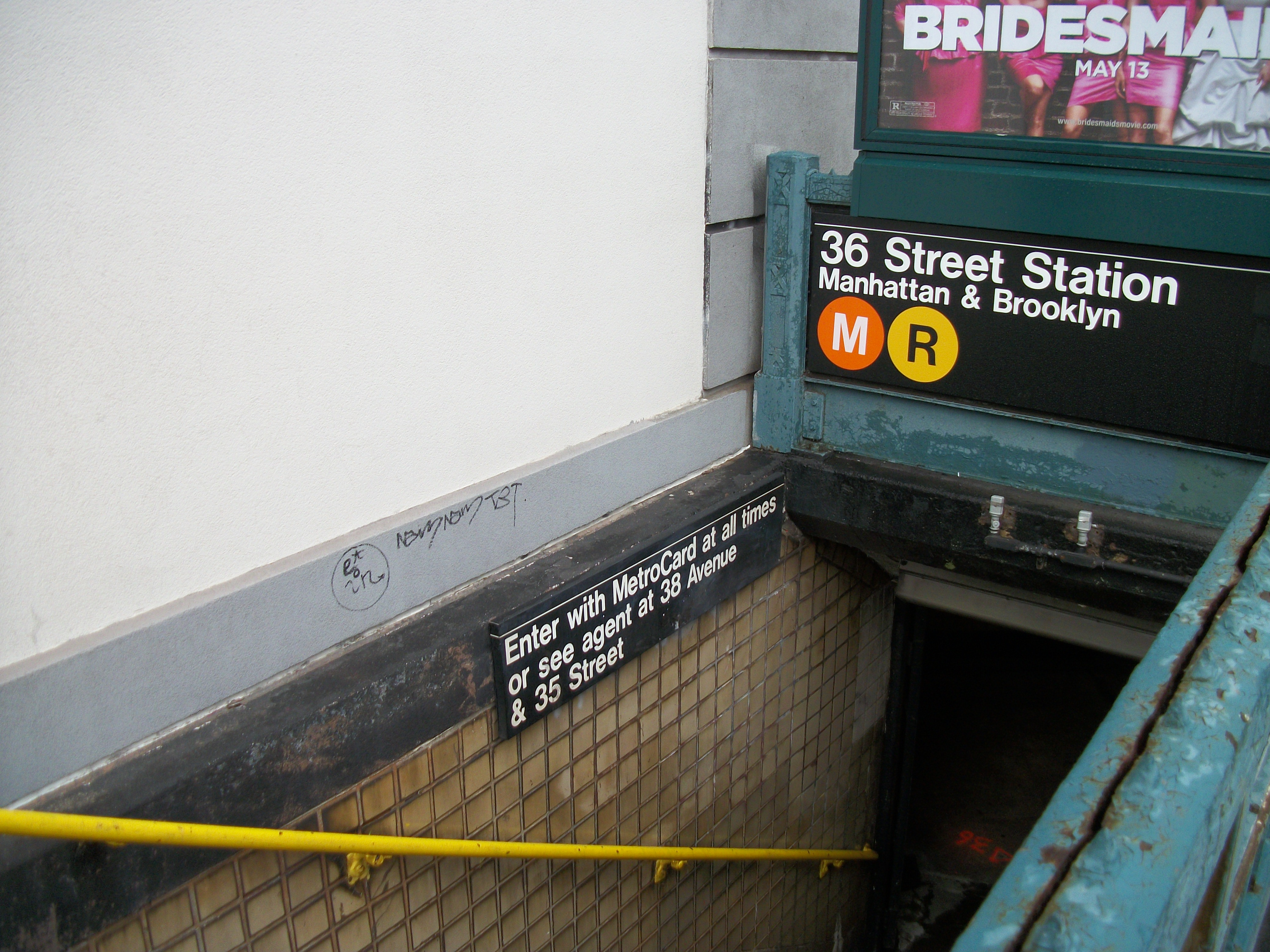
The northeast corner entrance to 36th Street station

Each platform has two fare control areas and there are no crossovers or crossunders to allow free transfer between directions. The fare control areas on the Manhattan-bound side are on platform level. The full-time one is at the middle and has a turnstile bank, token booth, and two staircases going up to the three-way intersection of Northern Boulevard, 36th Street, and 35th Street, one to the northeast corner and the other to the island formed by these three streets. The Manhattan-bound platform has another un-staffed entrance/exit at the extreme east (railroad north) end. It has two High Entry/Exit Turnstiles and a single staircase going up to the northeast corner of 36th Street and Northern Boulevard. Connecting these two fare control areas is a passageway that was formerly part of the platform as only a full-height fence separates them and it has the platform's trim line and name tablets.

The fare control areas on the Forest Hills-bound side are un-staffed and on small mezzanines above the platforms that are connected to each other. One is at the extreme west (railroad south) end and has one staircase to the platform, two HEET turnstiles, a part-time bank of regular turnstiles, and one street stair going up to the south side of Northern Boulevard east of 34th Street. The other fare control area has one staircase to the platform, one HEET turnstile and one exit-only turnstile, and one street stair going up to the south side of Northern Boulevard between 36th and 37th Streets.

=== Nearby track infrastructure ===
There are route selector punch boxes on the southbound platform for the connection to the IND 63rd Street Line (currently used by the F train during late nights, and by the M train on weekdays except late nights) west of the station.

East of this station, the express tracks dive down to a lower level and make a direct route to Roosevelt Avenue along Northern Boulevard while the local tracks turn north into Steinway Street and then east under Broadway. This is because Broadway and Steinway Street are not wide enough to hold four tracks underneath them. The only other line in the system where the express tracks split away from the mainline and make a shortcut is on the IND Culver Line between Seventh Avenue and Church Avenue in Brooklyn.
