= 50th Street station (IND lines) =

New York City Subway station in Manhattan

50 Street
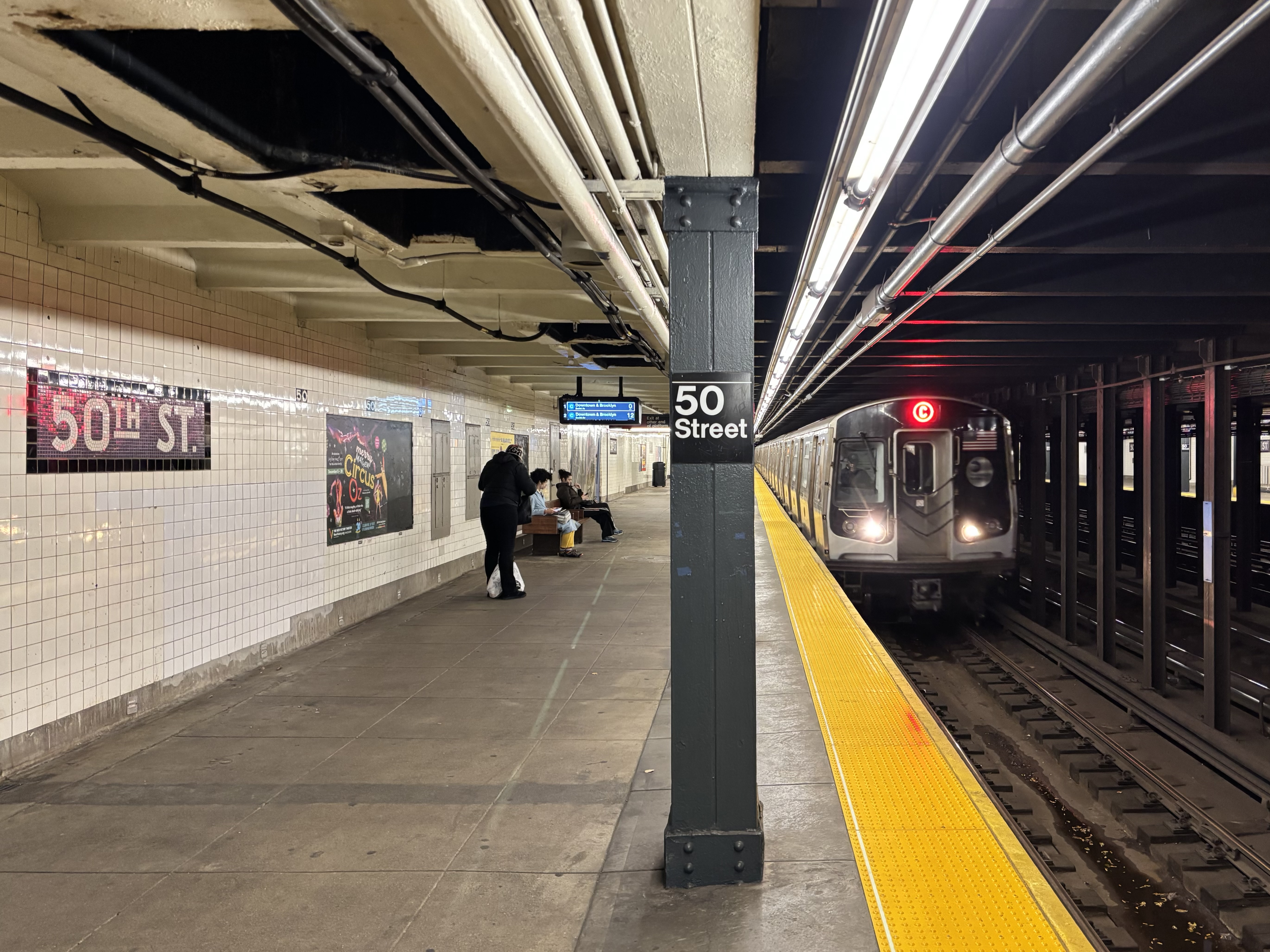
- Southbound R179 C train arriving on the upper level

Station statistics
- Address: West 50th Street & Eighth Avenue; New York, New York
- Borough: Manhattan
- Locale: Hell's Kitchen, Midtown Manhattan
- Coordinates: 40.762276°N 73.986139°W
- Division: B (IND)
- Line: IND Eighth Avenue Line; IND Queens Boulevard Line
- Services: A (late nights); C (all except late nights); E (all times)
- Transit: NYCT Bus: M20, M50, M104
- Structure: Underground
- Levels: 2
- Platforms: 4 side platforms (2 on each level)
- Tracks: 6 (4 on upper level, 2 on lower level)

Other information
- Opened: September 10, 1932; 94 years ago (upper level); August 19, 1933; 93 years ago (lower level)
- Accessible: Partially; full access planned (southbound platform accessible via elevator)

Traffic
- 2025: 5,823,868 ▲5.8%
- Rank: 49 out of 423
Services
Preceding station	New York City Subway	Following station
59th Street–Columbus Circle A C toward 168th Street	Local	42nd Street–Port Authority Bus Terminal A C E via Canal Street
Seventh Avenue E toward Jamaica Center–York College	E (New York City Subway service)	42nd Street–Port Authority Bus Terminal A C E via Canal Street
Location
Location within New York City Subway
Location within New York City
Location within New York
Track layout
Upper level
Lower level
Street map
Station service legend
Symbol	Description
Stops all times except late nights	Stops all times except late nights
Stops all times	Stops all times
Stops late nights only	Stops late nights only

The 50th Street station is a bi-level station on the IND Eighth Avenue and Queens Boulevard Lines of the New York City Subway, located at 50th Street and Eighth Avenue in the Hell's Kitchen neighborhood of Manhattan. The lower level, on the Queens Boulevard Line, is served by the E train at all times, and the upper level, on the Eighth Avenue Line, is served by the C train at all times except late nights, when the A train takes over service.

== History ==
On December 9, 1924, the New York City Board of Transportation (BOT) gave preliminary approval to the construction of a subway line along Eighth Avenue, running from 207th Street. The BOT announced a list of stations on the new line in February 1928, with a local station at 50th Street. Originally, the BOT did not plan for a 50th Street station on the Queens Boulevard Line. This station was to have only been served by Eighth Avenue trains heading north toward 168th Street in Washington Heights. The Eighth Avenue Association petitioned the BOT for an additional stop at 50th Street. On November 21, 1926, it was announced that the BOT had agreed to construct a stop at this location for the Queens Boulevard Line.

In October 1928, the BOT awarded a $444,000 contract to Charles Mead & Co. for the completion of the 50th Street, 59th Street, and 72nd Street stations on the Eighth Avenue Line. The finishes at the three stations were 20 percent completed by May 1930. By that August, the BOT reported that the Eighth Avenue Line was nearly completed and that the three stations from 50th to 72nd Street were 99.9 percent completed. The entire line was completed by September 1931, except for the installation of turnstiles.

The upper level opened on September 10, 1932, as part of the city-operated Independent Subway System (IND)'s initial segment, the Eighth Avenue Line between Chambers Street and 207th Street. Construction of the whole line cost $191.2 million. The lower level opened on August 19, 1933 with the opening of the IND Queens Boulevard Line to Roosevelt Avenue in Queens.

The family of William Zeckendorf, which developed the neighboring One Worldwide Plaza in the 1980s, renovated the 50th Street station in exchange for being allowed to construct additional floor area. The modifications included a mezzanine, escalators, elevators, and stairs next to the southbound platform. There is an elevator entrance on 49th Street and an escalator entrance on 50th Street. A closed stairway on 49th Street was refurbished as part of the project. The Zeckendorfs also commissioned artist Matt Mullican to create a mural on the southbound platform.

== Station layout ==
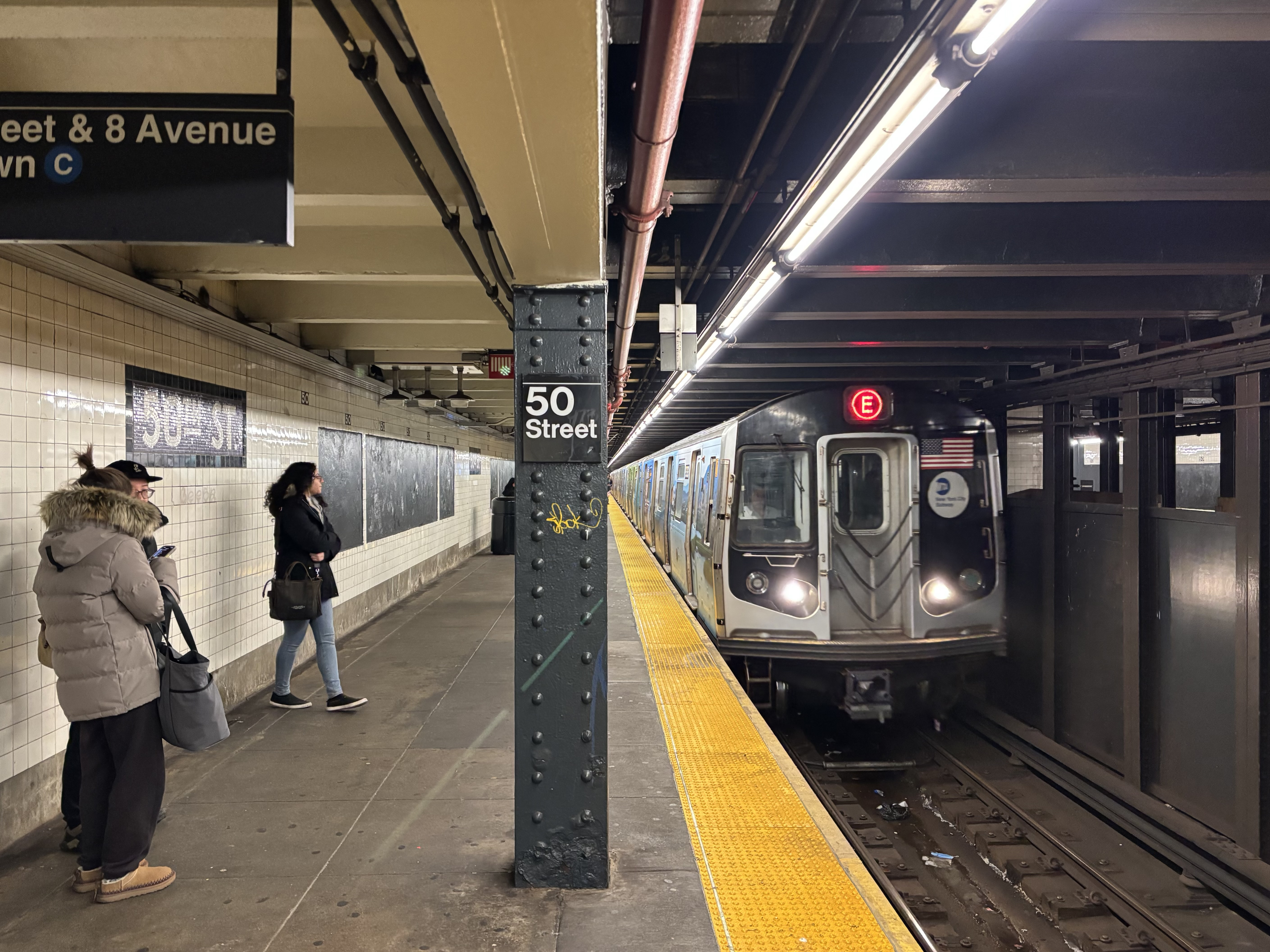
Northbound R160 E train arriving on the lower level

This bi-level station has six tracks and four side platforms in total. The upper level served by the C is located along the Eighth Avenue Line and is fed by Eighth Avenue local trains from Central Park West and has four tracks and two side platforms. The express tracks in the center are used by the A during daytime hours. Fare control is at platform level.

The lower level served by the E is located at the southern end of the Queens Boulevard Line and has two tracks and two side platforms, separated by a curtain wall for the majority of the station. At the northern end of the station, the curtain wall is not present and the two side platforms are in full view of each other. The northbound track of the lower level is fed by the northbound local and express tracks at 42nd Street. In the southbound direction, lower level trains may access either the Eighth Avenue local or express tracks; until 2003, they also had the option of running to the abandoned lower level of 42nd Street. The two levels are offset, with the upper level running from 50th to 52nd Streets and the lower from 49th to 51st Streets. Neither level has crossover or crossunder between directions, although level-to-level transfer in the same direction is possible.

The platform walls on both levels have no trim line, but there are mosaic name tablets reading "50TH ST." in white sans-serif lettering on an Ultra Violet background with black border. Small tile captions reading "50" in white lettering on black run in regular intervals between the name tablets, and are also present on the lower level's curtain wall. Blueberry I-beam columns run along all the platforms at regular intervals, alternating ones having the standard black station name plate with white lettering.

As part of One Worldwide Plaza's construction in the 1980s, artist Matt Mullican created an etched-granite mural for the station, which cost $150,000. The mural, measuring 70 feet (21 m) tall, contains black relief panels depicting the site's history and features neighborhood life.

The station is being renovated as part of the 2010–2014 MTA Capital Program. As of an MTA study conducted in 2015, at least 37% of components were out of date.

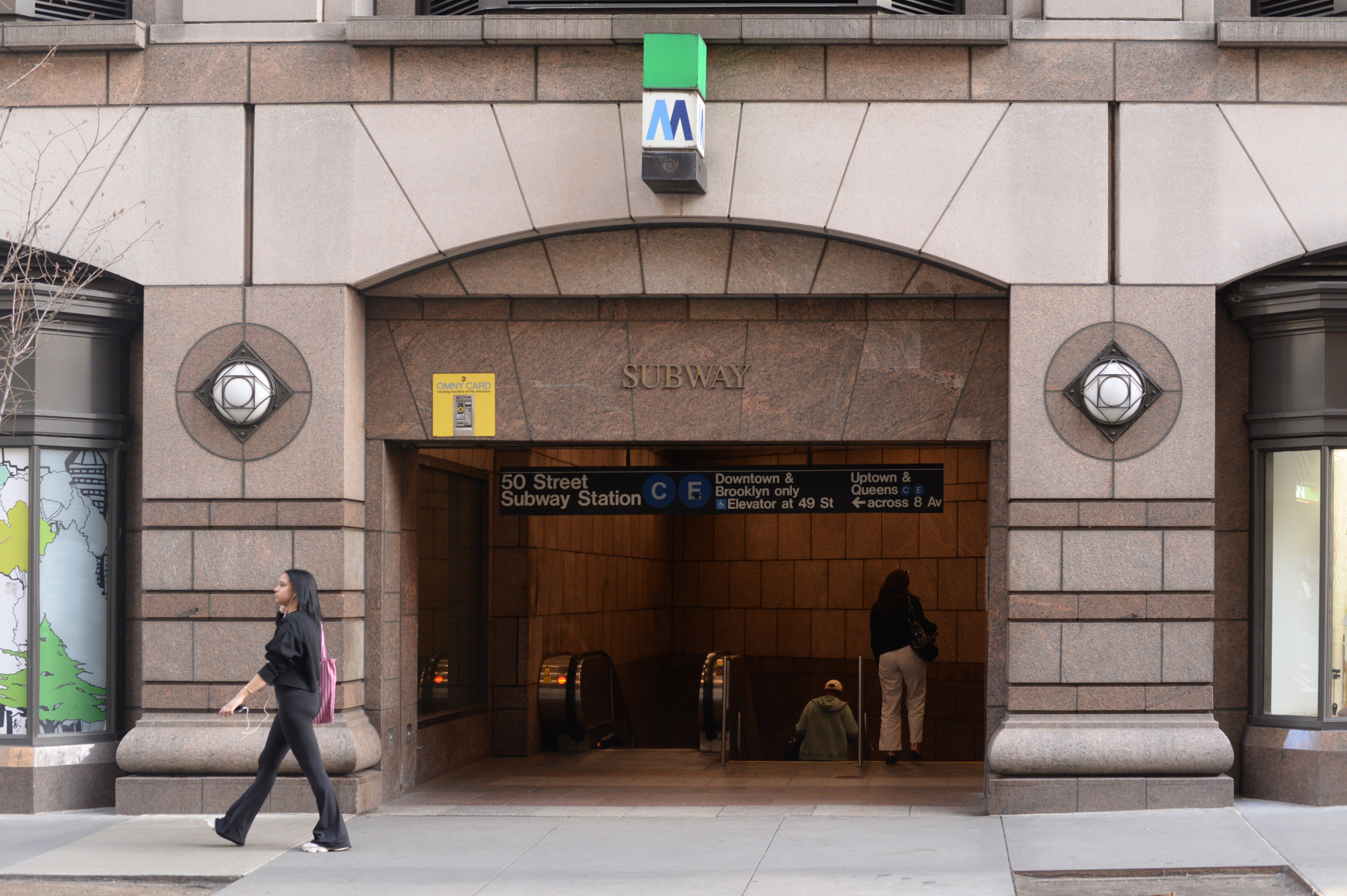
One Worldwide Plaza entrance

=== Exits ===
The southbound side of 50th Street has an expanded mezzanine area, with exits to 49th and 50th Streets. It also has two ADA-accessible elevators (one from the street to the mezzanine, the other from the mezzanine to the lower-level platform). A ramp leads from the mezzanine to the upper-level platform; it was constructed during the development of the Worldwide Plaza complex. The downtown side has an escalator to the lower level. The mezzanine contains stairs and escalators to One Worldwide Plaza's facade at the northwest corner of Eighth Avenue and 49th Street. There are also two street stairs to the southwest corner of that intersection, as well as one street stair to either western corner of Eighth Avenue and 50th Street.

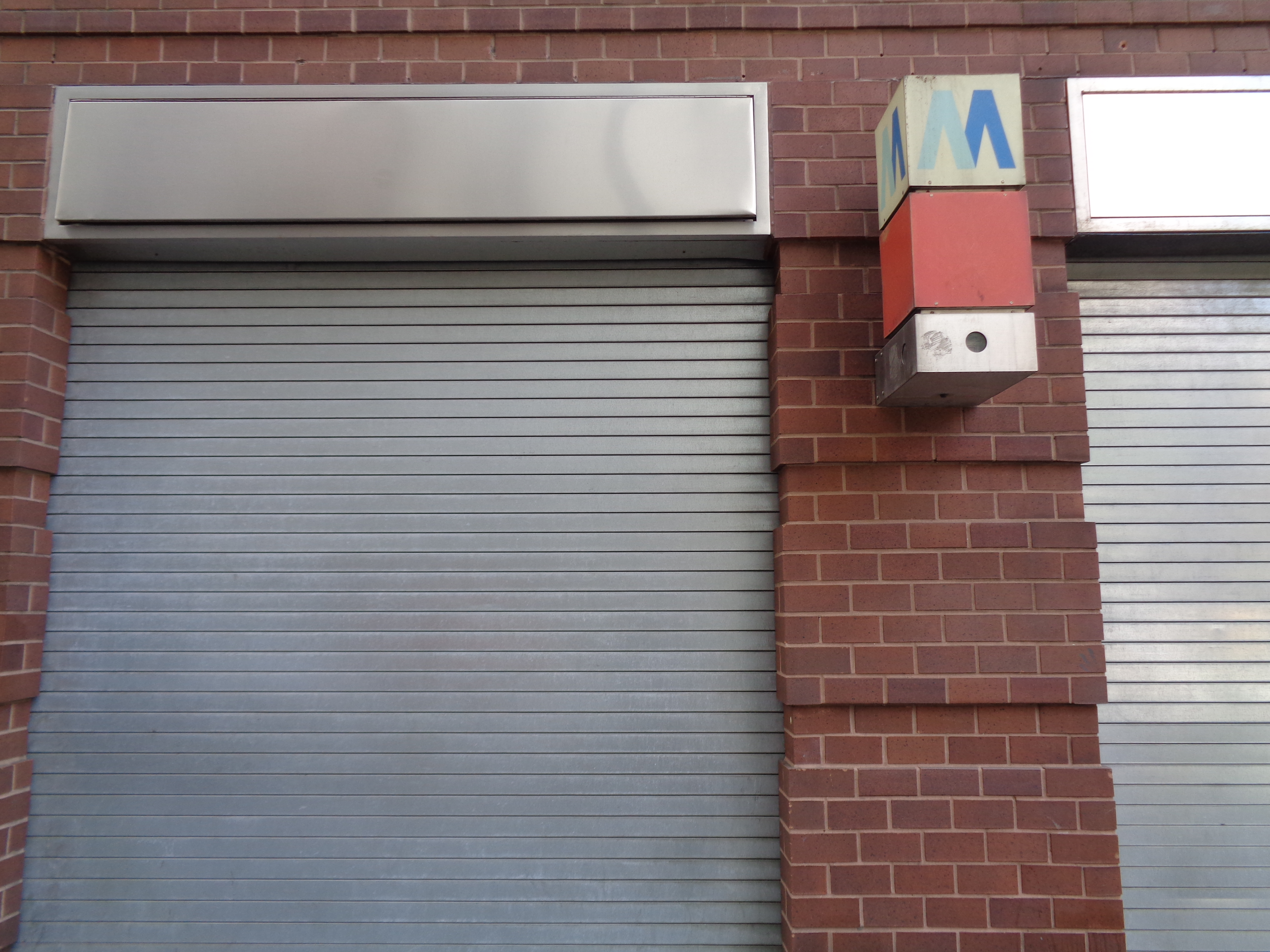
A closed entrance to the uptown platforms at 52nd Street

In contrast to the downtown platforms, the uptown platforms lack elevators and are not ADA-accessible. Renovation, including addition of an elevator on the uptown side of the station, was planned for the 2005–2009 MTA Capital Program and was to reopen many closed stairways to the lower level; however, only one stairway between both uptown platforms was reopened. There is one street stair from this platform to either eastern corner of Eighth Avenue and 50th Street; the southeast stair is located inside a building. An additional stair is located at the northeast corner of Eighth Avenue and 51st Street.

There are several closed exits from the station to the street, primarily at the north end of the station. These include stairs from all four corners of Eighth Avenue and 52nd Streets. A closed exit goes from the downtown platforms to the southwest corner of 51st Street and Eighth Avenue; this mirrors the exit to the same street from the uptown platforms. An additional closed exit from the uptown platforms is located at the southeast corner of 49th Street and Eighth Avenue; this mirrors the exit to the same street from the downtown platforms.
