= 63rd Street Shuttle =

Former New York City Subway service

The 63rd Street Shuttle was the name given to four shuttle trains that served the 63rd Street Lines of the New York City Subway during various times from 1997 to 2001, and again from 2023 to 2024.

== Sixth Avenue ==
Orange bullet for the Sixth Avenue/63rd Street Shuttle

Three of the shuttles ran along the IND Sixth Avenue Line.

The first shuttle, designated with an orange S, began in August 1997. It operated during overnight hours only between 21st Street–Queensbridge and Second Avenue via the IND 63rd Street Line and IND Sixth Avenue Line and made all stops along the full route. Prior to that, F and Q trains (Note: Between 1989 and 1993, a special daily late night F/Q combination service operated, in which F trains would operate along its normal route from Coney Island to 47th–50th Streets–Rockefeller Center, then turn into a Q and operate to 21st Street–Queensbridge; in the southbound direction, Q trains would operate from 21st Street to 47th–50th Streets, then turn into an F train and operate along its normal route to Coney Island. The special F/Q service was redesignated as F starting in April 1993.) served the IND 63rd Street Line during late nights. This service was suspended in February 1998 when construction suspended service between the 63rd Street Line and the Sixth Avenue Line, but it resumed in May 1999 when the construction was completed. It was discontinued in November 2000 when preparation for full-time service on the IND 63rd Street Connector began.

The second shuttle, also with an orange bullet, began on July 22, 2001, due to the closure of the north tracks on the Manhattan Bridge. It operated between 21st Street–Queensbridge and Broadway–Lafayette Street, running an almost identical route to the first. Unlike the first shuttle, this shuttle operated 24 hours, replacing the B and Q trains which previously served the IND 63rd Street Line during daytime hours. The shuttle operated at frequencies of 12 minutes during daytime hours, 15 minutes during evening hours, and 20 minutes during overnight hours. The shuttle initially utilized six-car R32 consists, but on July 26, 10-car R32 consists began to be utilized due to passenger complaints. On December 16, 2001, the 63rd Street connector to the IND Queens Boulevard Line opened and the F train was rerouted to serve the IND 63rd Street Line full-time, permanently replacing this shuttle. At the same time, the Grand Street Shuttle was extended beyond Broadway–Lafayette Street and originated and terminated at West Fourth Street.

The third shuttle ran from August 28, 2023, until March 29, 2024. F trains were rerouted via the 53rd Street Tunnel between Queens and Manhattan, and weekday M service was rerouted to 57th Street in Manhattan, due to track replacement and other repairs in the 63rd Street Tunnel. The shuttle operated every 20 minutes between Lexington Avenue-63rd Street and 21st Street-Queensbridge, stopping at Roosevelt Island every day during daytime hours only. Shuttle buses operated between Queens Plaza and 21st Street during daytime hours and between Queens Plaza and Roosevelt Island during overnight hours.

== Broadway ==
Yellow bullet for the Broadway/63rd Street Shuttle

This service, designated with a yellow S, ran at all times during reconstruction of the IND 63rd Street Line between February 22, 1998, and May 22, 1999. Originally running between 21st Street–Queensbridge and 57th Street–Seventh Avenue on the BMT Broadway Line via the BMT 63rd Street Line, it was extended to 34th Street–Herald Square on weekdays starting April 6, 1998, skipping 49th Street. The shuttle stopped at the downtown platform at 34th Street. During this time, B and Q trains terminated at 57th Street–Sixth Avenue, which was closed late nights, while the late night Sixth Avenue shuttle was suspended. Once work was completed, the Broadway shuttle was discontinued, the late night Sixth Avenue shuttle was restored, and B and Q trains returned to 21st Street–Queensbridge.

== Final route ==
63rd Street Line
| Stops all times | 21st Street–Queensbridge | Disabled access | | |
Manhattan
| Stops all times | Roosevelt Island | Disabled access | | Roosevelt Island Tramway |
| Stops all times | Lexington Avenue–63rd Street | Disabled access | | |
Sixth Avenue Line
| Stops all times | 57th Street | | | |
| Stops all times | 47th–50th Streets–Rockefeller Center | Disabled access | B D F | |
| Stops all times | 42nd Street–Bryant Park | Elevator access to mezzanine only | B D F 7 <7> (IRT Flushing Line at Fifth Avenue) | |
| Stops all times | 34th Street–Herald Square | Disabled access | B D F N Q R W <Q> (BMT Broadway Line) | Note: Diamond Q express discontinued in February 2004 |
| Stops all times | 23rd Street | | F | |
| Stops all times | 14th Street | | F 1 2 3 9 (IRT Broadway–Seventh Avenue Line at 14th Street) L (BMT Canarsie Line at Sixth Avenue) | Note: 9 train discontinued in May 2005 |
| Stops all times | West Fourth Street–Washington Square | Disabled access | F A C E (IND Eighth Avenue Line) | |
| Stops all times | Broadway–Lafayette Street | Disabled access | F 6 <6> (IRT Lexington Avenue Line at Bleecker Street; transfer to downtown trains only) | |
