= 63rd Street lines =

New York City Subway lines

BMT/IND 63rd Street Lines
- The IND 63rd Street Line is served by the M train on weekdays and F train on late nights and weekends. The BMT 63rd Street Line is served by the Q train. Limited BMT service is also provided by the N and R trains.

Overview
- Owner: City of New York
- Locale: Manhattan and Queens
- Termini: West of Lexington Avenue–63rd Street, Manhattan; South of 72nd Street, Manhattan; West of 36th Street, Queens
- Stations: 3

Service
- Type: Rapid transit
- System: New York City Subway
- Operator: New York City Transit Authority
- Daily ridership: 25,326

History
- Opened: October 29, 1989; 37 years ago (IND); May 1, 1995; 31 years ago (temporary usage of BMT); January 1, 2017; 9 years ago (permanent usage of BMT)

Technical
- Num of tracks: 2–4
- Character: Underground
- Track gauge: 4 ft 8 1/2 in (1,435 mm)
- Electrification: 600 V Direct current traction 3rd rail

The IND 63rd Street Line and BMT 63rd Street Line, also referred to as the 63rd Street Crosstown, Crosstown Route, or Route 131-A, are two rapid transit lines of the B Division of the New York City Subway system. The two lines run under 63rd Street on the Upper East Side of Manhattan, with a cross-platform interchange at the Lexington Avenue–63rd Street station.

Each line consists of two tracks in a stacked configuration, with the southbound tracks of each line parallel to each other on the upper level, while the northbound tracks are parallel on the lower level. Crossover connections between each line's respective tracks are located just to the west of the Lexington Avenue station. The IND line, the southern of the two lines, is served by M trains on weekdays and F trains on weekends and late nights; it connects the IND Sixth Avenue Line in Manhattan to the IND Queens Boulevard Line in Queens. It uses the upper level of the bi-level 63rd Street Tunnel to travel under the East River between Manhattan and Queens. The northern, BMT, line is served by the Q train at all times, although a limited number of N and R trains also serve the line during rush hours. Also known as the Second Avenue Connection, it links the BMT Broadway Line to the Second Avenue Subway, both in Manhattan. The crossover between the lines has been used in the past during service disruptions as well as during the Manhattan Bridge closures in the late 1990s.

These lines were conceived as part of the Metropolitan Transportation Authority's 1968 expansion plans, and along with the Archer Avenue lines and a small section of the Second Avenue Subway, they were the only portions of the plan to be completed before it was scaled back due to fiscal issues. The IND 63rd Street Line was originally planned to be extended further east into Queens as a super-express bypass of the IND Queens Boulevard Line. After these plans were abandoned in the mid-1970s, it was commonly referred to as a "subway to nowhere" because it ended one stop into Queens, without any infrastructure connecting to other subway lines in Queens. The 63rd Street Tunnel lay unused for over a decade, and its lower level, intended for future Long Island Rail Road (LIRR) service, was completed solely to support the subway line above it.

The IND 63rd Street Line between Queens and Manhattan opened on October 29, 1989, and was connected to the Queens Boulevard Line on December 16, 2001. The BMT 63rd Street Line in Manhattan was only used for regular service starting in 2017, when the Second Avenue Subway's first phase opened.

== Extent and service ==
The following services use the 63rd Street Lines:

Service information		Lines served	Section of line
Service	Division	Lines served	Section of line
"F" train	IND	Culver Local, Sixth Avenue Local, Queens Boulevard Express	entire IND section
"M" train	IND	Myrtle Avenue Local, Jamaica Local, Sixth Avenue Local, Queens Boulevard Local	entire IND section
"Q" train	BMT	Brighton Local, Broadway Express, Second Avenue Local	entire BMT section
(limited rush hour service)	BMT	Sea Beach Local/Fourth Avenue Express, Broadway Express, Second Avenue Local; Fourth Avenue Local, Broadway Local, Second Avenue Local	entire BMT section

The 63rd Street Lines comprise two physical pairs of trackage; each track pair's mileage is measured via different subway chaining schemes. One is chained as part of the Independent Subway System (IND), and the other is chained as part of the Brooklyn–Manhattan Transit Corporation (BMT).

The IND line begins as a northward continuation of the IND Sixth Avenue Line at 57th Street station. It runs under Sixth Avenue and Central Park, turning east under 63rd Street and running through the 63rd Street Tunnel under the East River, with stations at Main Street on Roosevelt Island and at 21st Street-Queensbridge under 41st Avenue in Queens. At its eastern end, the line merges with the IND Queens Boulevard Line under Northern Boulevard, west of 36th Street station. This line is coded as chaining route "T", with the southbound track marked as T1 and the northbound track designated T2. Beneath the subway tunnel is a lower level used by the Long Island Rail Road (LIRR), where it heads to Grand Central Madison. It is connected to Grand Central Terminal as part of the LIRR's East Side Access project, which commenced operations in 2023.

The BMT line begins as a northward continuation of the express tracks of the BMT Broadway Line at the 57th Street–Seventh Avenue station. It runs under Seventh Avenue, Central Park and 63rd Street before turning north under Second Avenue and merging with the Second Avenue Subway. The tracks on this line are coded with BMT chaining, labeled as tracks G3 and G4 to distinguish them from the pre-existing G1 and G2 tracks associated with the 60th Street Tunnel and Astoria Line. The odd-numbered tracks carry southbound trains, while the even-numbered tracks carry northbound trains.

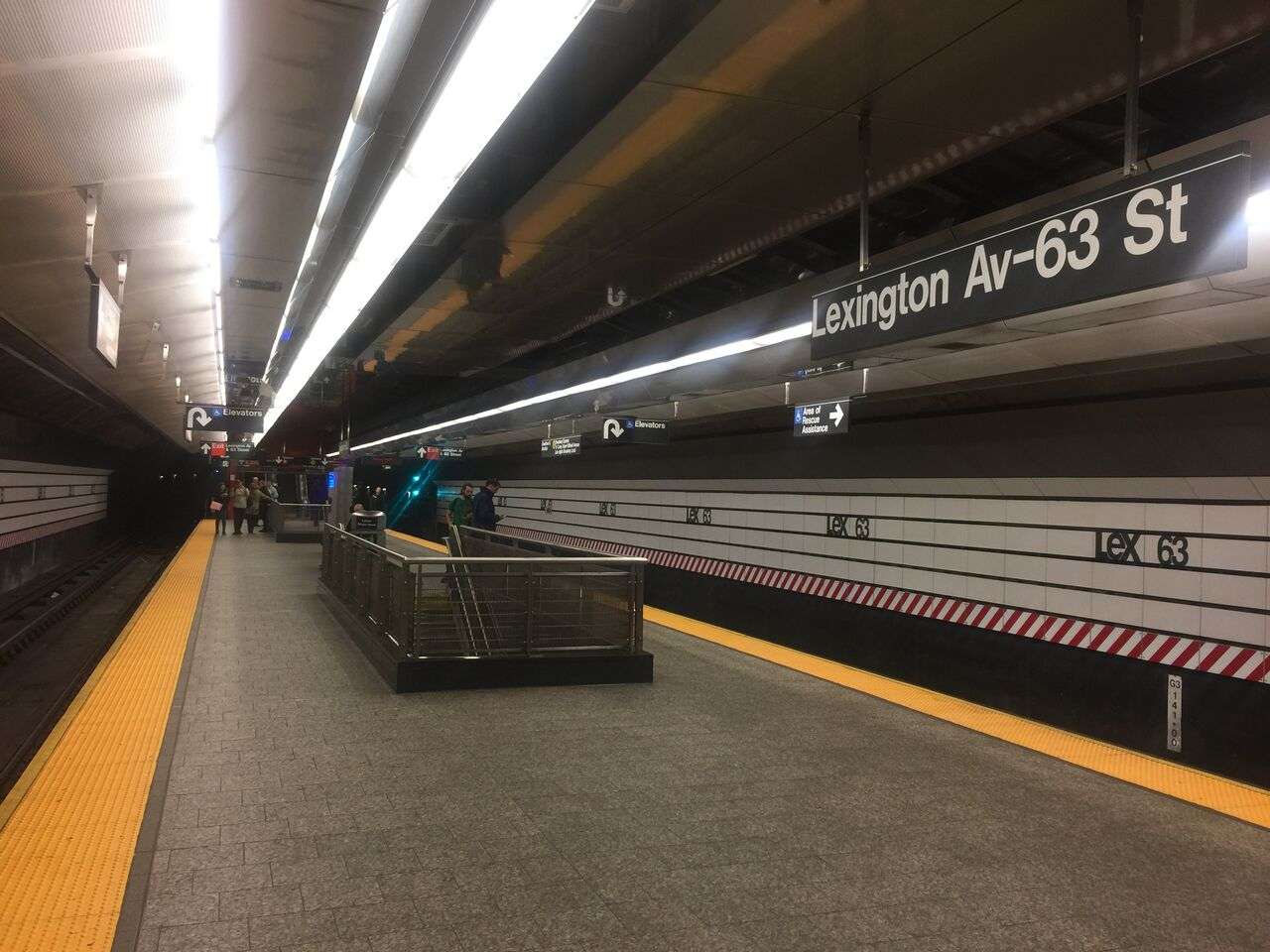
The two 63rd Street Lines meet at Lexington Avenue–63rd Street station

The two lines intersect at the Lexington Avenue–63rd Street station, where there are cross-platform interchanges for both northbound and southbound trains. Just west of Lexington Avenue-63rd Street, two diamond crossover tracks allow trains to switch between the two lines. This connection, not used in passenger service, allows trains to run from the Broadway Line to the Queens Boulevard Line and from the Sixth Avenue Line to the Second Avenue Line.

=== Service history ===
The first segments of the two lines opened on October 29, 1989; the IND line opened between 57th Street and 21st Street–Queensbridge, and the BMT line opened between 57th Street-Seventh Avenue and Lexington Avenue-63rd Street. The BMT 63rd Street Line was not used for passenger service. The IND Line was usually served by B, F and Q trains; during this time, Q trains ran on the IND Sixth Avenue Line due to reconstruction of the Manhattan Bridge. From the line's opening until September 1990, service was provided by Q trains during weekdays, by B trains during weekends, and by an F/Q (Note: Between 1989 and 1993, a special daily late night F/Q combination service operated, in which F trains would operate along its normal route from Coney Island to 47th–50th Streets–Rockefeller Center, then operate as a Q train to 21st Street–Queensbridge. In the southbound direction, Q trains would operate from 21st Street to 47th–50th Streets, then operate as an F train along the F's normal route to Coney Island. The special F/Q service was designated as F starting in April 1993.) combination route late nights. Starting in September 1990, evening Q service was replaced by the B instead. In April 1993, the F/Q combination designation was dropped and was simply known as F. The JFK Express also served the IND line very briefly; the service was discontinued on April 15, 1990. From April to November 1995, as part of the Manhattan Bridge reconstruction, the bridge's north side (Sixth Avenue) tracks closed during middays and weekends; the Q ran on the BMT Broadway Line during these times, using the BMT 63rd Street Line and switching to the IND 63rd Street Line to Queens west of Lexington Avenue-63rd Street.

In May 1997, 63rd Street Shuttle service via the IND Sixth Avenue Line replaced F service during late nights. Between February 22, 1998, and May 22, 1999, service between the Sixth Avenue Line and the 63rd Street Line was suspended because of construction on the IND tracks. B and Q trains were cut back to 57th Street, and the late night shuttle suspended. During this time, a different shuttle provided full-time service between 21st Street–Queensbridge and 34th Street-Herald Square via the BMT Broadway Line; for instance, in 1995, this shuttle switched between the IND and BMT Lines west of Lexington Avenue station. On May 22, 1999, the B and Q returned to 21st Street–Queensbridge.

On July 22, 2001, the north side tracks of the Manhattan Bridge, which served the Sixth Avenue Line, closed. B and Q service on the IND 63rd Street Line was replaced with a full-time shuttle via the Sixth Avenue Line. On December 16, 2001, the 63rd Street Connector to the IND Queens Boulevard Line officially opened, and the F was rerouted to serve the IND Line at all times, replacing the shuttle and assuming its current service pattern.

On January 1, 2017, the first phase of the Second Avenue Subway opened, extending the Q (now running via the BMT Broadway Line), and some rush-hour N short turn trips, along the BMT 63rd Street Line. The Q and N then turned north to connect to the Second Avenue Subway, terminating at 96th Street. Before the Second Avenue Subway opened in 2017, the BMT line was generally not used for passenger service, except for detours due to emergencies or construction on other lines (including the aforementioned periods in 1995 and 1998). Because the line was not used in regular service from 1989 to 2016, it was not shown on the official subway map, except in 1995 and 1998. Prior to 2011, these tracks were also used to store train sets outside of rush hour. From August 28, 2023, through April 1, 2024, F trains were rerouted via the 53rd Street Tunnel between Queens and Manhattan, and weekday M trains were truncated to 57th Street in Manhattan, due to repairs in the 63rd Street Tunnel. An F shuttle train ran between Lexington Avenue-63rd Street and 21st Street-Queensbridge, stopping at Roosevelt Island, at all times except late nights. Shuttle buses ran between Queens Plaza and 21st Street–Queensbridge during the day and between Queens Plaza and Roosevelt Island at night.

In June 2025, internal MTA documents were leaked, indicating that a proposal to reroute M trains through the 63rd Street Tunnel and reroute F trains through the 53rd Street Tunnel would be presented for approval in fall 2025. If approved, the route swap would be implemented by December. The route swap is anticipated to reduce overcrowding at 63rd Street line stations, as well as reduce reliance on critical interlockings west of the 36th Street station in Queens. In September 2025, the MTA confirmed that the F and M trains would swap routings on weekdays starting on December 8, 2025, with the F running via 53rd Street and the M running via 63rd Street.

== History ==
=== Early plans ===
In February 1963, the New York City Transit Authority (NYCTA) proposed a two-track East River subway tunnel under 76th Street with unspecified connections to the rest of the transit network, at a cost of $139 million. In a May 2, 1963, report, the proposed site of the tunnel was switched to 59th Street. On May 24, Mayor Wagner suggested that a tunnel around 61st Street "be built with all deliberate speed". On October 17, 1963, the Board of Estimate approved a new East River tunnel sited at 64th Street, noting that it would cost $30 million and take seven years to build. The 64th Street site was said to be $5.3 million less expensive, "because of easier grades and smaller curves".

The lack of specificity about how the tunnel would be used was criticized at an early date. In December 1964, the Citizens Budget Committee said that the project, now shifted to 63rd Street, was "leading nowhere-to-nowhere". The Committee went on to propose three connections that were eventually adopted (connections to the BMT Broadway Line and IND Sixth Avenue Line, both at 57th Street, and to the IND Queens Boulevard Line near Queens Plaza), and one that was not adopted (a connection to the IRT Lexington Avenue Line).

The route was changed to 63rd Street because officials at Rockefeller Institute at 64th Street feared that heavy construction and later train movements so close to the institute's buildings might have adversely affected delicate instruments at the Institute and change the accuracy of the research being conducted. The Board of Estimate approved the revised 63rd Street route on January 14, 1965, at a budget of $28.1 million and a four-year timetable, with the connections to the rest of the transit network awaiting a study that was then scheduled for completion in mid-1966. The New York Times noted that "A variety of possible connections...are under study," including possible new lines under Madison and Second Avenues. The NYCTA's chairman, Joseph E. O'Grady, said that the tunnel and the subway connections would eventually be completed at about the same time, "since construction of the tunnel takes at least a year longer than the connections".

In 1966, Mayor John Lindsay gave his approval for the 63rd Street option, preferring it over the 61st Street option. Lindsay's administration proposed a new station at 63rd Street to connect with the Lexington Avenue/59th Street station via an underground arcade surrounded by retail areas. Communities along the route of the proposed crosstown tunnel disagreed on the exact routing. Advocacy groups such as the Citizens Budget Commission, Citizens Union, and the Commerce and Industry Association preferred a 61st Street routing for easier interchange with the Lexington Avenue/59th Street station. Queens civic leaders supported the 63rd Street proposal, saying that a transfer station at 61st Street would worsen congestion on the already busy Lexington Avenue Line.

A third track was added to the plans for the tunnel in April 1966. The track would serve Long Island Rail Road (LIRR) trains to east Midtown, alleviating train traffic into Pennsylvania Station. That August, a fourth track was added to the plans after it was determined that LIRR trains would be too large to run on subway tracks. This amendment increased the number of LIRR tracks to two, and provided dedicated tracks for the LIRR and the subway.

In November 1967, voters approved a $2.5 billion transportation bond issue, and in early 1968, under the Program for Action, officials provided detailed plans for how it would be used. Among many other projects, the proposal included:

- Three portions of a new 63rd Street–Southeast Queens line. This included a bi-level 63rd Street tunnel for both subway and Long Island Rail Road service; a super-express bypass for the IND Queens Boulevard Line running along the LIRR Main Line between Northern Boulevard and Forest Hills–71st Avenue; and an IND Queens Boulevard branch line running along the LIRR Atlantic Branch right-of-way.
- A new Long Island Expressway line for northeastern Queens, running to Queens College and Kissena Boulevard with a later extension to Springfield Boulevard
- A new Archer Avenue subway line for eastern Queens, running to 188th Street in Hollis
- A Second Avenue Subway line, with multiple connections to the 63rd Street line

This proposal, with some modifications, received approval from the Board of Estimate on September 21, 1968.

=== Construction ===
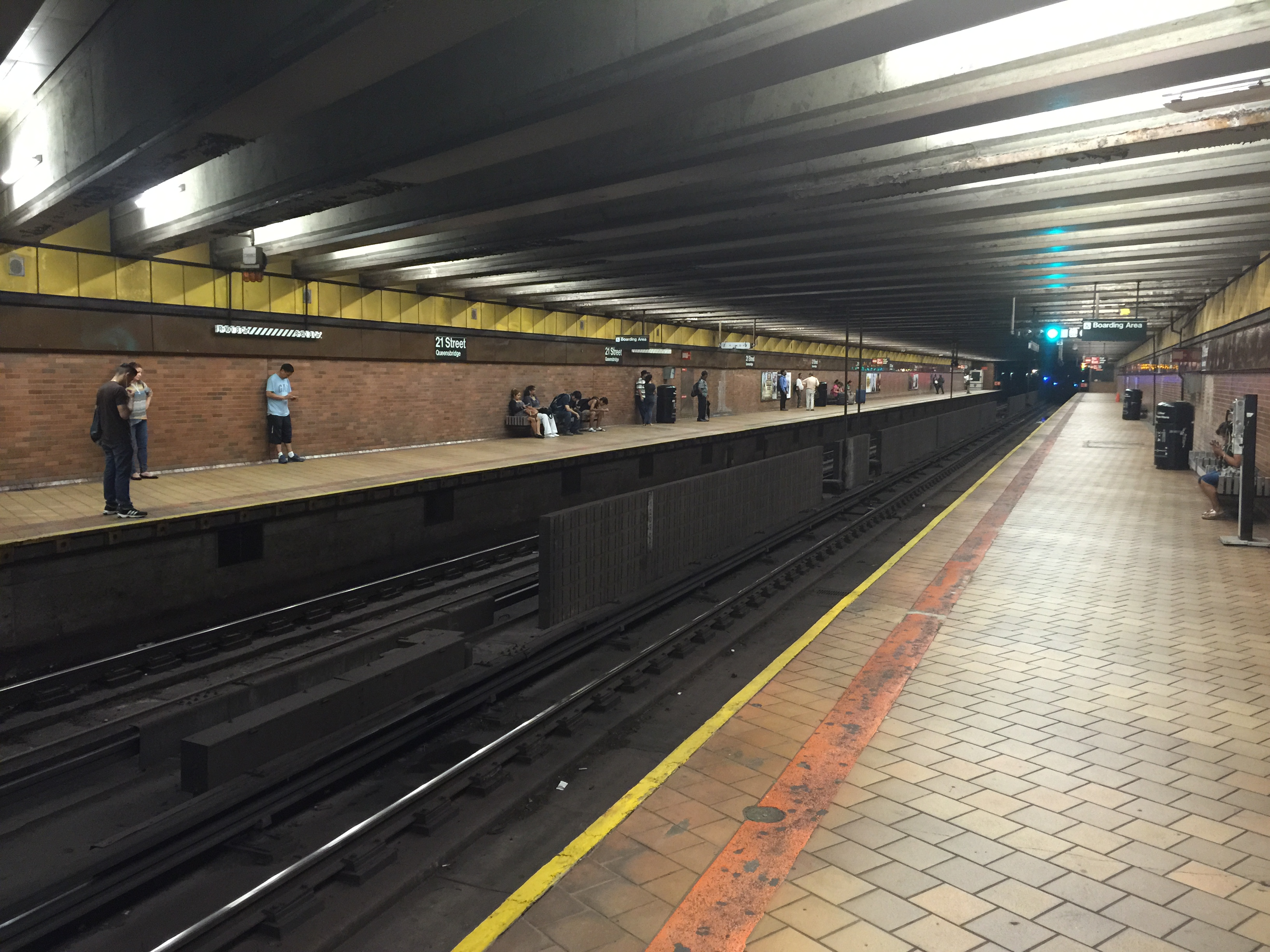
The 21st Street–Queensbridge station

Plans for the 63rd Street Line were approved by the New York City Board of Estimate on June 3, 1969. Groundbreaking ceremonies for the line took place on November 24, 1969, at Vernon Boulevard and 21st Street in Queensbridge Park, Long Island City. Workers tunneled westward from Queens, as well as in both directions under Roosevelt Island. Four 38-foot-square (12 m) prefabricated sections of the 63rd Street Tunnel were constructed at Port Deposit, Maryland, then towed to New York and sunk under the East River. The first of the tunnel segments was delivered in May 1971 and was lowered into place on August 29, 1971; the last section was lowered on March 14, 1972. The double-deck, 3,140-foot (960 m) tunnel under the East River was "holed through" on October 10, 1972, with the separate sections of tunnels being connected.

One section of the line that ran through Central Park was controversial because it called for 1,500 feet (460 m) of cut-and-cover tunneling, which would require digging an open trench through Central Park. In May 1970, Manhattan Community Board 8 held a meeting so constituents could voice concerns about the project's impact. The next month, Mayor John Lindsay told city engineers to write a report that studied ways to reduce the project's impact. The results of the report, released in January 1971, called for using tunnel boring machines underneath Central Park to reduce disruption. In February 1971, the NYCTA published advertisements in newspapers, seeking construction bids for the tunnels under Central Park. After the advertisements had run for three days, the NYCTA withdrew them after community and conservation groups objected. Later that month, the NYCTA finally agreed to halve the width of the proposed 75-foot (23 m)-wide cut, which resulted in a proportionate decrease in the area of affected parkland. The NYCTA also agreed to reduce disruption to the Heckscher Playground, located above the proposed subway tunnel's path, by cutting construction time from three years to two years and by constructing a temporary playground nearby. In March, the NYCTA again sought construction bids. The sections that connected to the existing Broadway and Sixth Avenue Lines were holed through on October 11, 1973. Construction on the section between 5th Avenue and Park Avenue began in August 1974. The project involved digging a 45-foot (14 m)-high cavern underneath the street.

On March 20, 1975, New York mayor Abraham Beame announced significant cutbacks to the plan. Construction of the Southeastern Queens extension was deferred until 1981, and the Long Island Rail Road extension through the lower level of the 63rd Street tunnel was canceled for the foreseeable future. However, it was still anticipated that the Queens Boulevard super-express and the Archer Avenue Line up to Parsons/Archer would still be completed. The Queens project, although curtailed, was given priority because it was "more advanced in construction".

By January 1976, the tunnel was 95% complete. In May, construction was briefly halted when residents jumped into utility pits to protest the cutting of trees near the Lexington Avenue station. A US federal judge issued a stop-work order on May 13, but issued another verdict five days later that allowed construction to proceed. Construction resumed on May 25, after three weeks of protests, and the trees were cut down anyway.

In summer 1976, the NYCTA announced that "it will take an extra five or six years—until 1987 or 1988—to complete the new Manhattan–Queens trunk subway line from Central Park to Jamaica via the new 63rd Street tunnel." The main cause of the delay was the 5.8-mile "super express", although it was expected that the three new Archer Avenue line stations could be ready sooner. As an interim measure, the NYCTA proposed a new station at Northern Boulevard, adjacent to Queens Plaza, which could possibly open by 1983 or 1984. However, there were also a lack of federal funds, so this could not be completed immediately. By this time, there were only going to be seven stations on the 63rd Street and Archer Avenue Lines combined. At the time, these two lines were part of the same route, the 63rd Street–Southeast Queens line.

The Manhattan portion of the line was completed in 1976. The Times noted:

Underneath Central Park lie two eerily quiet sets of tracks. They have advanced equipment – welded tracks, fluorescent lighting and rubber-based pads under the rail – that have not yet been installed on most of the system's 230 operating miles.

These tunnels were finished in 1976. This year, the contractor will tear down his two-story office in Central Park, remove the fence near Fifth Avenue and restore foliage and the bird house he damaged, at a cost of $300,000.

By 1981, five years after completion of the tunnel, the Transit Authority expects to put it to use; its brand new quiet tracks will be used as a storage yard for out-of-service trains.

==== Zoo York Wall ====
The Zoo York Wall was a graffiti wall within the line's length through Central Park, where subway writers and other street artists "made their marks" in the early 1970s. It was a temporary wall, erected by the NYCTA in 1971 to block unauthorized entry into the site of the 63rd Street Line running underneath the Central Park Zoo. Its name originates from the 63rd Street Tunnel (which it was supposed to guard), then called the "Zoo York Tunnel". During the tunnel's construction (1971–1973), the tunnel provided a subterranean gathering place for very early subway artists who hung around together in Central Park, and was named Zoo York by ALI, founder of the SOUL ARTISTS graffiti crew. The name came about because it was in a zoo in New York, hence "Zoo York".

Armored with polished aluminium in the futile hope of resisting spray-paint and permanent marker ink, the wall did little to dissuade teenage graffiti writers from climbing over and descending into the tunnel during its construction. Graffiti artists also marked their territory by "tagging" the wall which had been put up around the construction site. Upon completion of the subway project in 1973, the "Zoo York Wall" was torn down.

The name came about because the Central Park Zoo at that time was a classical 19th-century menagerie, populated by wild animals displayed in open-air cages, who paced the bars back and forth neurotically—always hoping for an escape, yet paradoxically blind to the world beyond their cramped quarters. ALI noted that by contrast, here were these feral teenagers, himself included, living in a free society, who sought nothing more wholeheartedly than to crowd together in a deep, dark hole in the ground. Marvelling at their perverse urban psychologies, ALI decided that all city people were insane for seeking imprisonment in tiny apartments, offices, subway cars and the like, and declared that New York City itself was "not New, but a Zoo!" He named the tunnel itself "Zoo York".

=== The unused tunnel ===
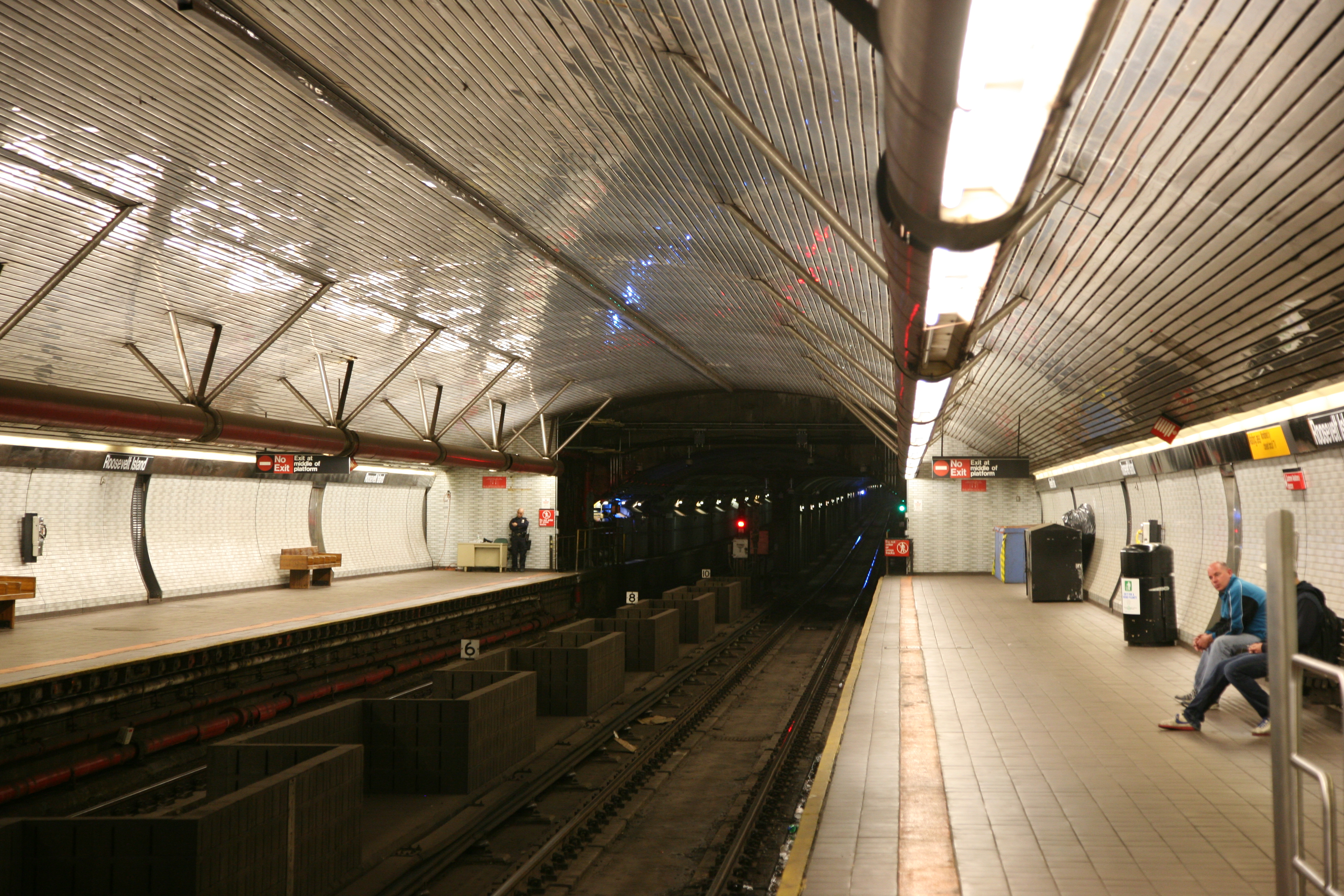
The Roosevelt Island station

In May 1978, the Times noted, "What started out a few years ago as 40 miles of new subway routes to serve the long-suffering residents of Queens has been whittled down to 15 miles, is years behind schedule, and will cost more than twice as much as originally estimated....The line costs $100,000 a foot, will be very short and will serve only a modest number of riders." The article now noted that the Queens super-express had been deferred "to 1988 at the earliest", and the only sections in progress were the 63rd Street Line to Northern Boulevard, and "a small piece along Archer Avenue". The 63rd Street Line's opening date was projected for 1985. The plan depended on the idea that Queens Boulevard riders would be willing to exit the subway at Queens Plaza and walk a city block to a new station at Northern Boulevard to continue their trip. The NYCTA projected that this transfer would draw 11,000 passengers a day.

By October 1980, officials considered stopping both projects and spending the money on maintaining the existing system. By then, the Archer Avenue project was projected for completion in 1984, and the 63rd Street line in 1985. The Times noted that the lower level of the 63rd Street tunnel was still under construction, even though it would remain unused indefinitely. Richard Ravitch, the MTA chairman, said that to stop the work was "so costly as to make it impractical subsequent to the construction of the subway portion." It "had to be finished – largely for structural reasons – to support the subway tunnel above". The line was described as a "tunnel to nowhere" because the tunnel would have one station in Queens, and because it would not connect to any other lines.

In 1979, the New York City Department of Transportation and a steering committee started reexamining the New Routes program. The Queens Transit Alternatives Study was undertaken, evaluated 18 transit plans, and recommended that 5 be further evaluated. The MTA unveiled five proposals to local communities in the spring of 1983. The proposals ranged from leaving it as-is, with the line's terminus in Long Island City, to the original 1960s plan to connect the 63rd Street Line to the LIRR Main Line, the cost of which was now estimated at $1 billion. At 21st Street–Queensbridge, usage estimates for that station in 1984 were 220 passengers per hour unless a connection was made to the rest of the system. These options were formally evaluated by an Alternative Analysis/Draft Environmental Impact Statement completed by the Federal Transit Administration and the MTA in May 1984. The MTA was studying four options for making this line more useful:

1. The Queens Express Bypass: extending the line along the LIRR Main Line to Forest Hills–71st Avenue. It would be completed in 1998 and cost $931 million. This was the original plan for this line proposed in the 1968 Program for Action. This was also the only option that the MTA felt that would add passenger and train capacity to the E and F express services. At a proposed station at Northern Boulevard, a transfer concourse to Queens Plaza would have allowed transfers between local, express, and bypass trains.
2. Feeding the line into the IND Queens Boulevard Line's local tracks under Northern Boulevard. This alternative would be completed the earliest, by 1993; ran the shortest distance, with only 1,500 feet between 29th Street and Northern Boulevard; and was the cheapest, at a cost of $222 million. However, the E and F services in Queens, the most crowded in the system, would not see any added capacity from such a connection, while the 63rd Street line would run at only 1/3 of its total capacity, in addition to reducing the viability of future extensions to the line. It would also require the G service to terminate at Court Square instead of operating local on the Queens Boulevard Line. An option similar to this was ultimately chosen, and the F was rerouted through the line to reduce congestion, with G service eliminated north of Court Square.
3. Extending the line through the Sunnyside Yard and onto the LIRR Montauk Branch, running directly to the lower level of the Archer Avenue Line in Jamaica. The Montauk Branch in Queens is currently used for freight service, last seeing passenger service in 1998, and would have been rebuilt and electrified. The Montauk line would merge with the BMT Jamaica elevated at Lefferts Boulevard just west of 121st Street, then use the BMT approach to the Archer Avenue subway. The Jamaica El would be truncated to Crescent Street in Brooklyn and replaced by bus service. New stations would be built at Thomson Avenue within the Sunnyside Yard, and at Fresh Pond Road (the site of the former Fresh Pond station) and Woodhaven Boulevard (at the former Ridgewood station site) along the Montauk Branch. The now-closed Richmond Hill station on the Montauk Branch would be renovated and lengthened for subway service. The LIRR would have exclusive use of the tracks during overnight hours for freight service. This $594 million option would be open by 1997, but people living around the Montauk Branch opposed the proposal due to fears of increased traffic and danger from the Montauk Branch's multiple grade crossings, though plans called for new overpasses and access roads to eliminate these crossings.
4. Extending the line to a new subway/LIRR terminal at Thomson Avenue within the Sunnyside Yard, with a walking transfer to the Queens Plaza station, and a transfer to a new LIRR route that would go to Rosedale and Queens Village via the Montauk Branch. The LIRR would be rebuilt, grade-separated, and electrified. The Richmond Hill station would be renovated for additional LIRR service, while the Hollis and Queens Village stations would be converted from side platform stations to island platform configurations. This $488 million option, to be completed by 1995, was also opposed by people living along the Montauk Branch.

The suburban Glendale, Ridgewood and Middle Village communities in central Queens strongly opposed any proposals involving the Montauk Branch, which ran through their neighborhood. The ultimately agreed-on plan was to connect the tunnel to the local tracks of the IND Queens Boulevard Line, at a cost of $222 million, and a timetable of at least eight years. It was estimated that the project would attract 16,500 passengers per hour. This was the cheapest plan besides doing nothing. The MTA board approved this plan on December 14, 1984. The section of the line up to Long Island City was projected to open by the end of 1985.

By June 1985, the project was again delayed indefinitely. According to The New York Times, the tunnel had originally been planned to open that year, but then inspectors found that the tube was not ready for service. The tunnels had been inundated with 6 feet (1.8 m) of water, and several girders and electrical equipment had also deteriorated.

Two contractors were hired to assess the structural integrity of the tunnel, and the delay was estimated at two years. The federal government withheld $31 million of funding for the tunnel in July 1985 due to "'wholly inadequate' management of the tunnel's construction". In August 1985, at the instigation of Senator Al D'Amato, the federal government suspended funding on both the 63rd Street and Archer Avenue projects over "concerns with the construction management practices". The two projects had cost nearly $1 billion between them, of which the federal government had provided $530 million for 63rd Street and $295 million for Archer Avenue.

=== Opening ===
By February 1987, the MTA's contractors had concluded that the tunnel was structurally sound, although federal funding had not yet been released. The MTA approved a new plan to have the tunnel open by October 1989. The agency also proposed a $550 million, 1,500-foot connector to both the express and local tracks of the IND Queens Boulevard Line. Under the plan, the Queens Boulevard Line would be "reverse-signaled", which would accommodate Manhattan-bound trains on three out of the line's four tracks in the morning rush, and the opposite for the evening rush. This part of the plan was not projected to begin before the 1990s.

In June 1987, the federal government completed its own review of the project. "A little light appeared at the end of the Metropolitan Transportation Authority's 63rd Street 'tunnel to nowhere' last week", the Times reported, as the government's own inspector found the tunnel sound, and released the final installment of $60 million for both the 63rd Street and Archer Avenue projects. The first train to use the extension was the "rail polisher train", a non-revenue move that occurred on August 1, 1989.

The 63rd Street lines went into service on October 29, 1989, twenty years after construction began, with new stations at Lexington Avenue, Roosevelt Island, and 21st Street/41st Avenue in Queens. The IND line was served by Q trains on weekdays and B trains on weekends. The 1,500-foot (460 m) connector to the Queens Boulevard Line had not yet started construction. The BMT line was not in use at that time. It was built for future service options, including a connection to the Second Avenue Subway for service from the Upper East Side to Lower Manhattan. From May to November 1995, the north side of the Manhattan Bridge was closed for reconstruction during middays and weekends and the Q train was routed via Broadway at this time. It used the BMT 63rd Street Line to connect to the IND 63rd Street Line and serve Lexington Avenue, Roosevelt Island, and 21st Street–Queensbridge stations.

From February 22, 1998, to May 22, 1999, 63rd Street Shuttle trains operated via this line between 21st Street–Queensbridge and 57th Street–Seventh Avenue, later running further to 34th Street–Herald Square. The 57th Street/Sixth Avenue station was closed from 12:30 to 6 a.m. daily during the project. The project had initially been slated to be completed in fall 1999, but normal service resumed in May 1999, ahead of schedule. The 1998–1999 reconstructions were to replace the tracks, which had become deteriorated after eight years of use due to a flaw in the railway ties; namely, an "innovative" design of "shallow epoxy-and-sand pads" had weakened the base of the rails.

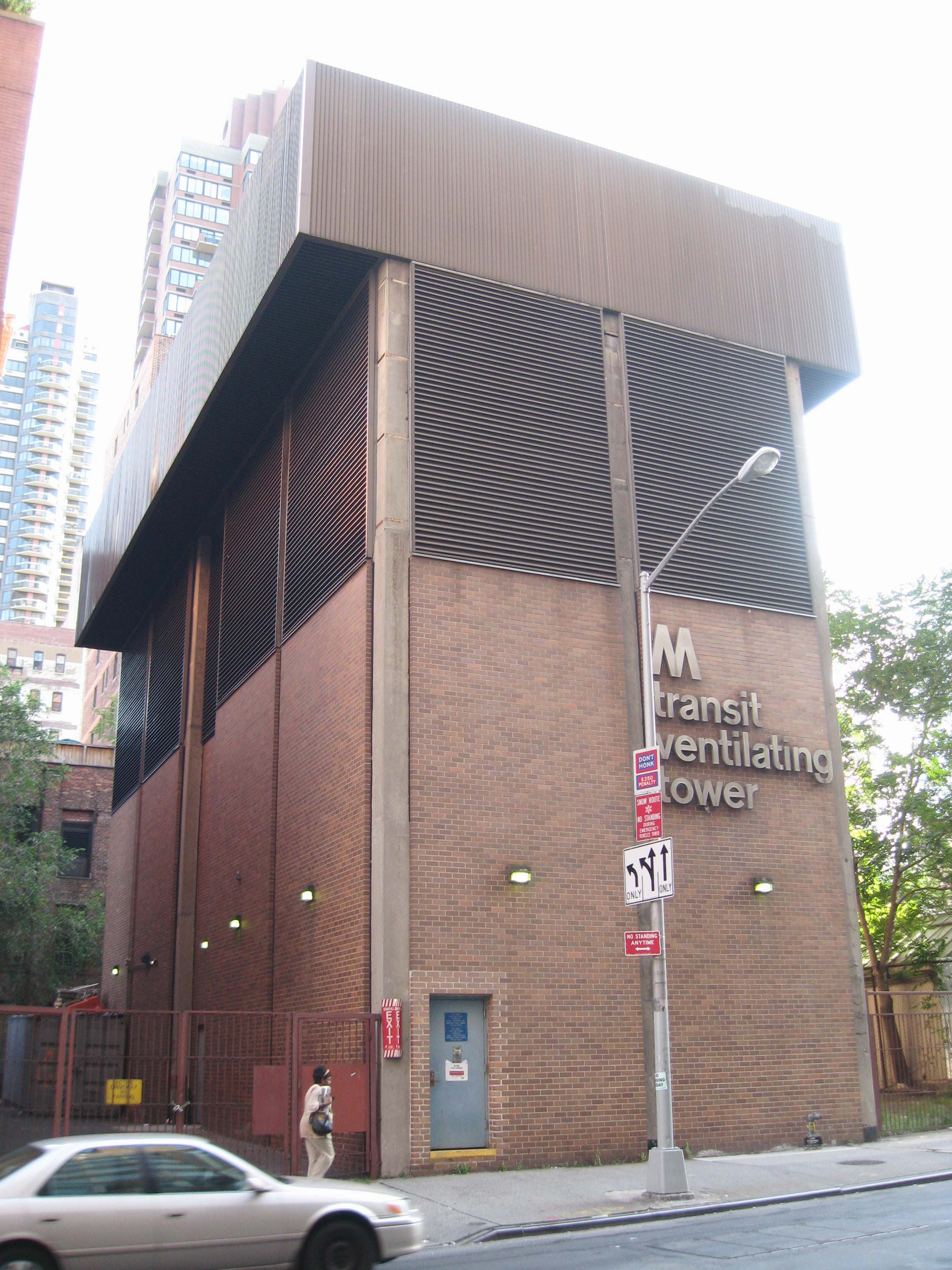
Ventilating tower in Manhattan (2nd Avenue & E 63rd Street)

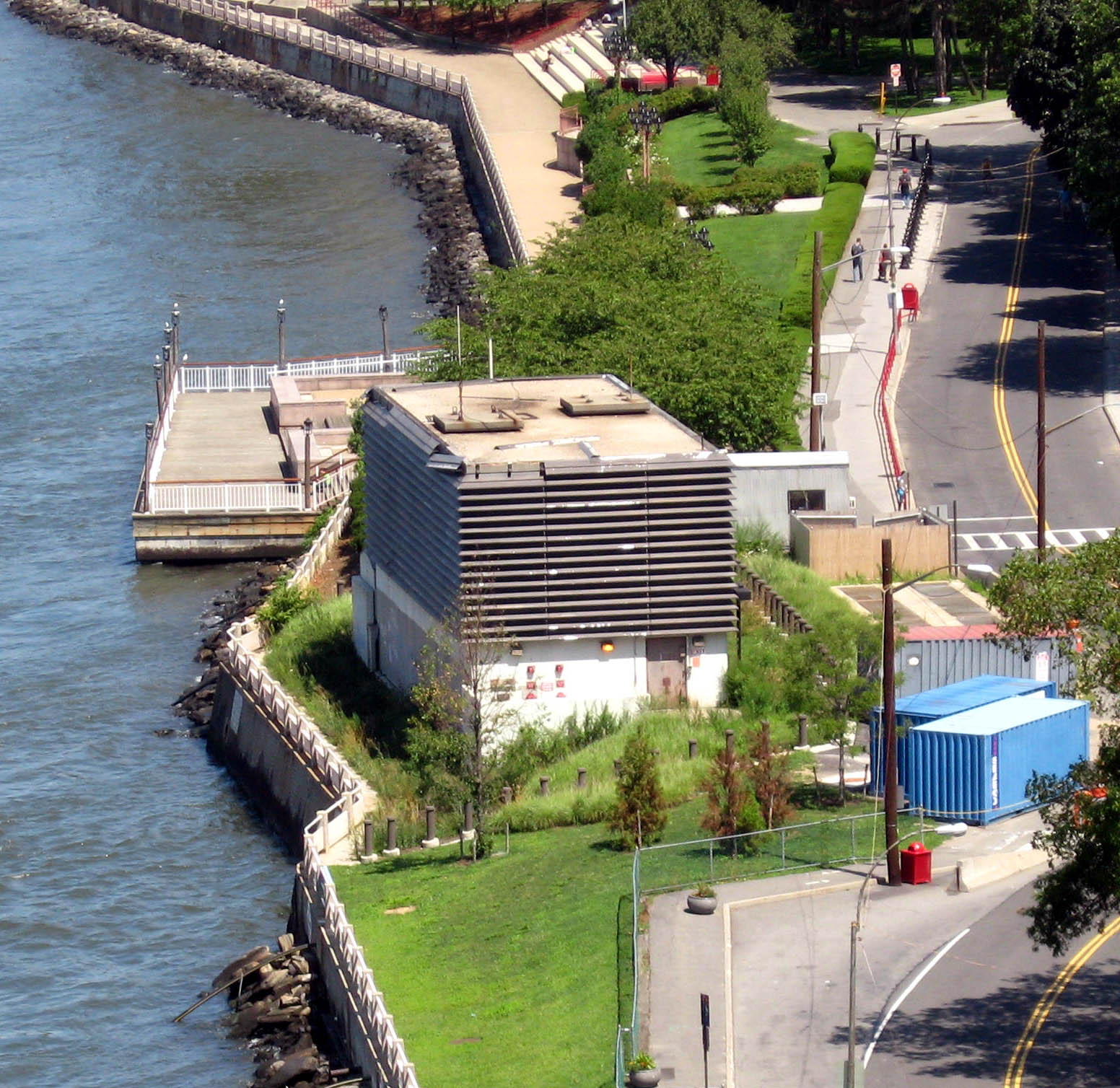
Roosevelt Island ventilation building

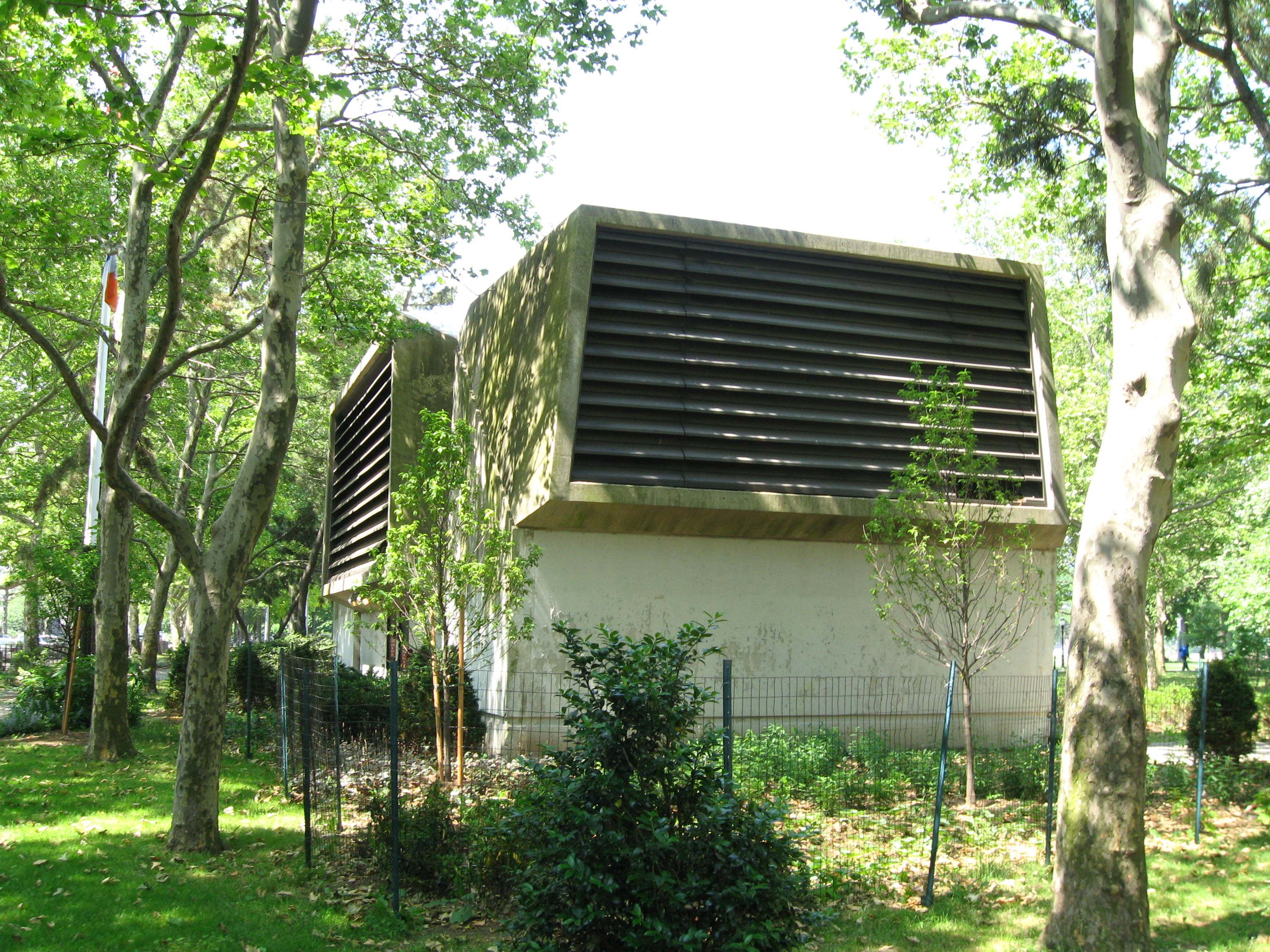
Queens ventilation structure

=== Connection to the Queens Boulevard Line ===
Planning for the connection to the IND Queens Boulevard Line began in December 1990, with the final design contract awarded in December 1992. Two build alternatives were evaluated: a connection to the local tracks of the Queens Boulevard Line, and a connection to the local and express tracks. The goal of the project was to increase capacity on Queens Boulevard by 33% and to eliminate the dead-end terminal at 21st Street–Queensbridge. Bellmouths were constructed to allow for a future bypass line through Sunnyside Yard.

The remaining section from 21st Street to the Queens Boulevard Line, which cost $645 million, began construction on September 22, 1994. The construction project also extended the lower level LIRR tunnel and involved a number of other elements, including the integration of ventilation plants, lowering a sewer siphon 50 feet, rehabilitation of elements of the existing line, mitigating ground water, diverting trains which continued to run through the project area and widening of the entry point to the Queens Boulevard Line to six tracks. In December 2000, the 63rd Street Connector was made available for off-peak construction reroutes, but the first revenue in-service train did not use the connector until one month later. Regular service was expected to begin by August or September of that year. However, the September 11, 2001, terrorist attacks delayed the commencement of regular service. The connector came into regular use on December 16, 2001, with the rerouting of F service at all times to 63rd Street.

The 63rd Street Connector created a new path between Manhattan and the heavily traveled Queens Boulevard Line, increasing the amount of train service that could be run between Manhattan and Queens. With the F rerouted via 63rd Street, service through the 53rd Street Tunnel was replaced by the V, a new local service that ran along the Sixth Avenue and Queens Boulevard lines. This service was discontinued on June 25, 2010, and replaced with a reroute of the M.

=== Connections to the Second Avenue Subway ===
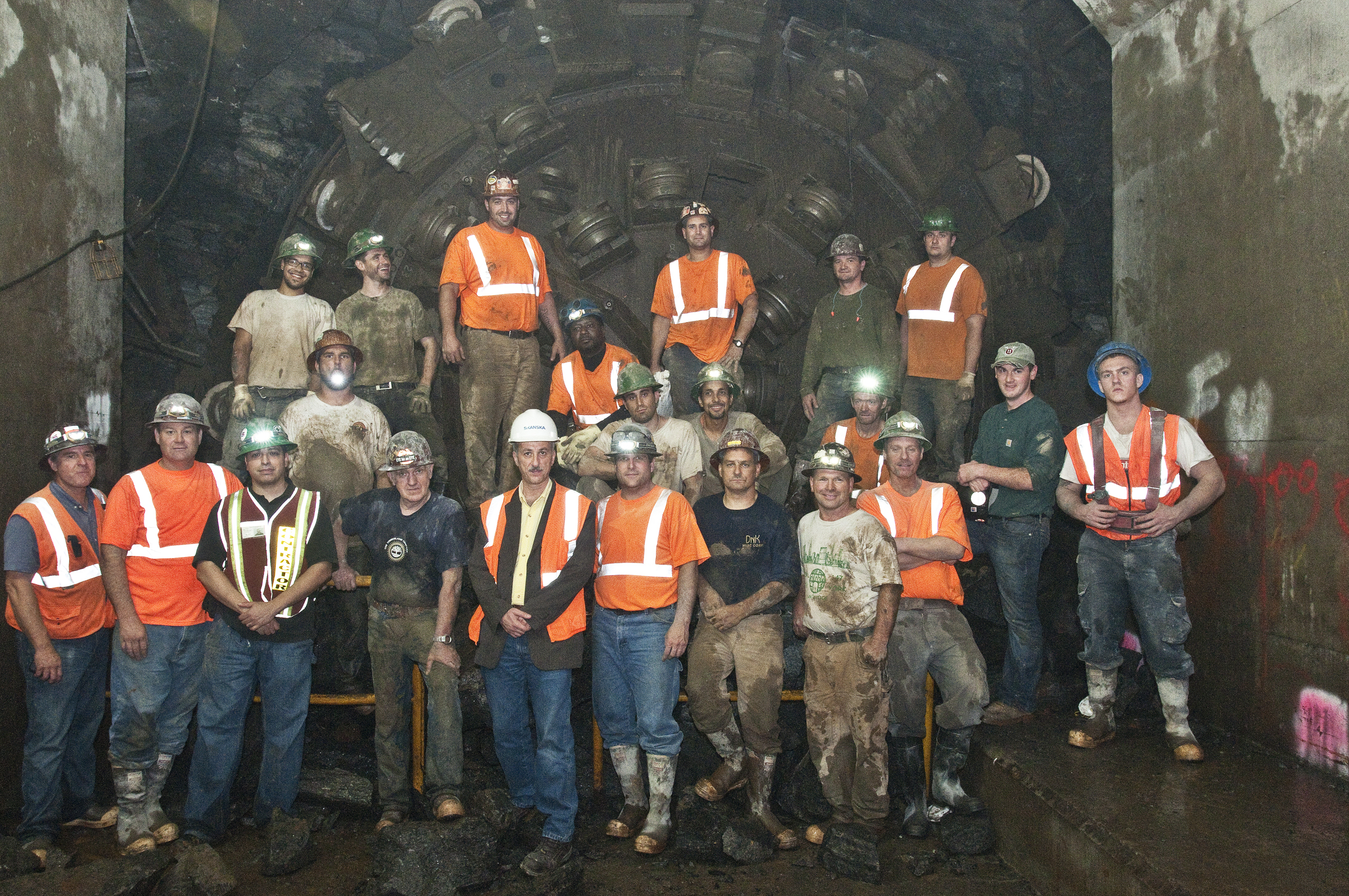
Workers celebrate after the IND Second Avenue Line Tunnel Boring Machine reaches the BMT 63rd Street Line.

The 63rd Street Lines were envisioned to connect the Second Avenue Subway to the BMT Broadway Line, the IND Sixth Avenue Line, and Queens. The BMT 63rd Street Line would directly connect the upper Second Avenue Line to the Broadway Line. Construction on the IND Second Avenue Line began in 1972, but was halted in 1975 due to the New York City fiscal crisis. As a result, the BMT 63rd Street Line was not finished and instead ended abruptly at Lexington Avenue-63rd Street station. In 2007, construction on the Second Avenue line recommenced and in 2011, construction started at Lexington Avenue-63rd Street to expand and renovate the station, and to complete the connection to the Second Avenue Line. This renovation removed the walls on the platforms and opened new entrances on the Third Avenue side of the station. The tunnel boring machine being used to create the tunnels for the first phase of Second Avenue Line broke through the wall into the lower level of the BMT 63rd Street Line on September 22, 2011.

On January 1, 2017, the first phase of the Second Avenue Line opened, extending the Q and N services under Central Park and eastward to the stop at Lexington Avenue–63rd Street before turning north at Second Avenue to merge with the Second Avenue Line. This created direct service between the Upper East Side and the existing BMT Broadway Line. The double-decked Lexington Avenue–63rd Street station provides cross-platform interchange between the two 63rd Street lines. Northbound trains use the lower level; southbound trains use the upper level.

The third phase of Second Avenue Line construction, which is not funded as of 2017, is proposed to include a separate connection between the IND 63rd Street Line and the Second Avenue Line, turning southwest from 63rd Street onto Second Avenue. This connection would allow trains coming from the IND Queens Boulevard Line to run on the Second Avenue Line to Midtown Manhattan and Lower Manhattan. However, the MTA does not plan to run passenger trains through this connection and it would be used only for movements by non-passenger trains, although passenger service could be possible if subway capacity in Queens is increased to accommodate extra service. Garbage piled up within the unused bellmouths for this connection; when the trash was cleaned up in 2021, MTA officials estimated that the rubbish piles might have been accumulating in the bellmouths since the 1980s.

=== 2020s to present ===
As part of a $107 million project, the tunnels experienced numerous service disruptions in 2023 to accommodate replacement of direct fixation track and cables, installation of new signal equipment, leak remediation, and repairs to concrete surfaces. Much of the concrete track was installed in 1981, eight years before the line opened. Regular service via 63rd Street resumed on April 1, 2024.

== Station listing ==
Station service legend
Stops all times	Stops 24 hours a day
Stops all times except late nights	Stops every day during daytime hours only
Stops weekdays during the day	Stops during weekday daytime hours only
Stops weekends and weekday evenings	Stops during weekend daytime and weekday evening hours
Stops rush hours only	Stops during weekday rush hours only
Stops rush hours in the peak direction only	Stops during weekday rush hours in the peak direction only
Time period details
Disabled access	Station is compliant with the Americans with Disabilities Act
↑	Station is compliant with the Americans with Disabilities Act in the indicated direction only
↓	Station is compliant with the Americans with Disabilities Act in the indicated direction only
	Elevator access to mezzanine only

Disabled access	Station	Services	Opened	Transfers and notes
IND Line begins as a split from the IND Queens Boulevard Line (F M )
Disabled access	21st Street–Queensbridge	F M	October 29, 1989	
63rd Street Tunnel
Disabled access	Roosevelt Island	F M	October 29, 1989	
63rd Street Tunnel
BMT Line begins as a split from the IND Second Avenue Line (N Q R )
Disabled access	Lexington Avenue–63rd Street	F M N Q R	October 29, 1989 (IND); January 1, 2017 (BMT)	MetroCard/OMNY transfer to IRT Lexington Avenue Line (4 5 6 <6> ) at 59th Street; MetroCard/OMNY transfer to BMT Broadway Line (N R W ) at Lexington Avenue–59th Street
connecting tracks
IND Line continues as a branch of the IND Sixth Avenue Line (F M )
BMT Line continues as BMT Broadway Line express tracks (N Q R )
