= Grand Street Shuttle =

Former New York City Subway service

- Grand Street Shuttle

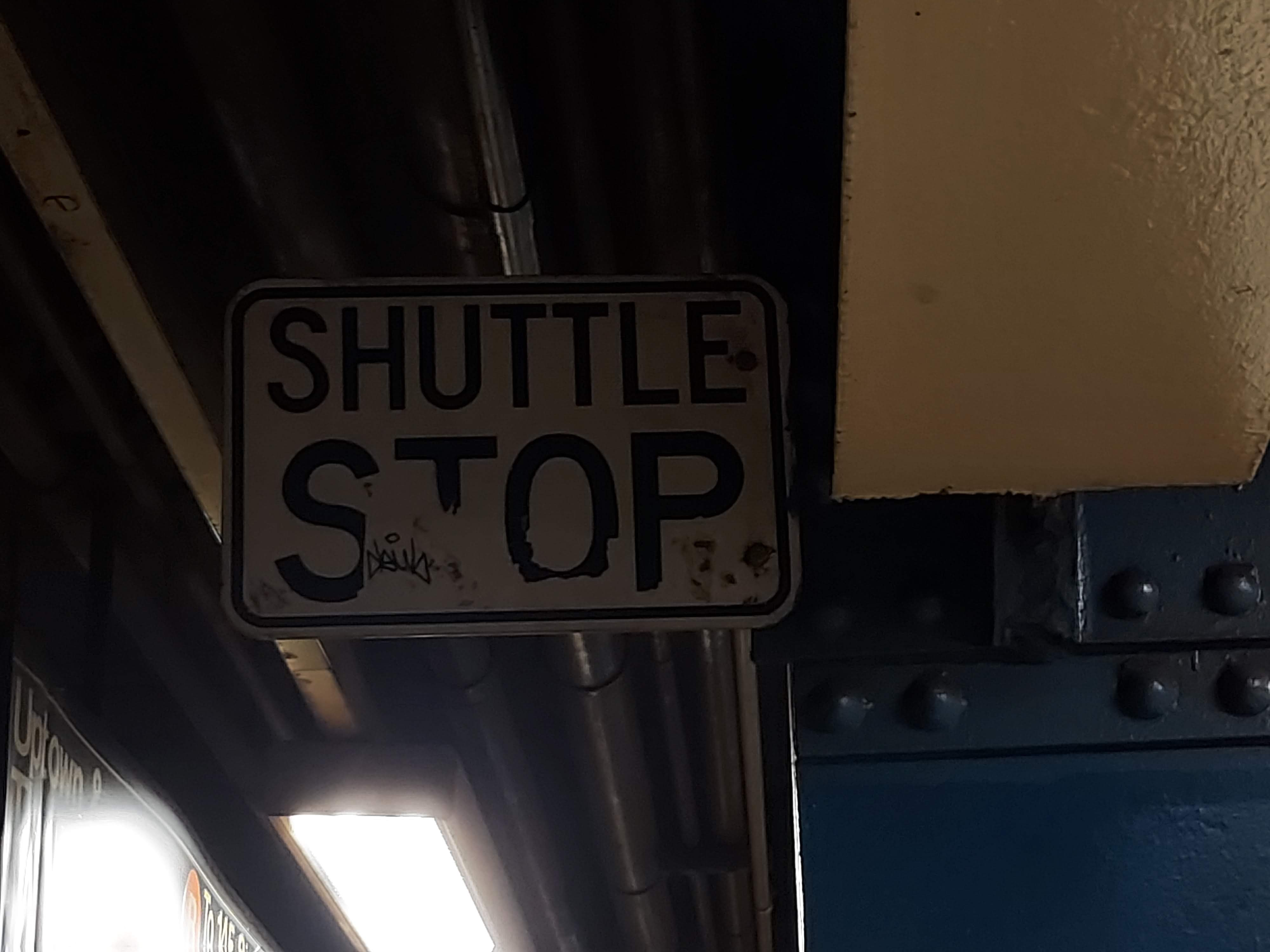
- A remnant of the Grand St shuttle at Broadway–Lafayette Street station, which shows where shuttle trains stopped.
- Northern end: West Fourth Street
- Southern end: Grand Street
- Stations: 3
- Started service: 1986; 40 years ago
- Discontinued: 2004; 22 years ago

The Grand Street Shuttle was a New York City Subway service that operated during the long Manhattan Bridge rehabilitation project while the north tracks (connecting to the IND Sixth Avenue Line via the Chrystie Street Connection) were closed. It usually ran between Broadway–Lafayette Street and Grand Street, picking up the slack from rerouted or suspended B and D service.

== History ==
Service disruptions that took the Manhattan Bridge north tracks out of service, with the shuttle running between Broadway–Lafayette Street and Grand Street, included the following:

- March 12, 1984 and August 10 to November 3, 1985 (B and D cut back to West Fourth Street–Washington Square)
- April 30 to November 12, 1995 (B running only between Atlantic Avenue–Pacific Street and Coney Island–Stillwell Avenue while the D was running between Norwood–205th Street and 34th Street–Herald Square).

During the first phase of the Manhattan Bridge rehabilitation, from April 26, 1986 to December 11, 1988, the shuttle was extended to 57th Street/Sixth Avenue, running via the Sixth Avenue local tracks, and was called the Sixth Avenue Shuttle while the B and D terminated at 34th Street–Herald Square. Regular service had been expected to resume on October 26, 1986.

The final Grand Street Shuttle service began on July 22, 2001, again between Broadway–Lafayette Street and Grand Street, while the B and D services were truncated to 34th Street–Herald Square. The Sixth Avenue Shuttle (which also ended at Broadway–Lafayette Street) was ended on December 16, 2001 with the rerouting of F trains to the 63rd Street Tunnel and introduction of the V train, and the Grand Street Shuttle was extended north to West Fourth Street–Washington Square. On April 27, 2003, service was decreased to run every 15 minutes instead of every 12 minutes at all times except late nights. The rehabilitation was finished on February 22, 2004, and the shuttle was discontinued. Also during this time, a shuttle bus ran between Canal Street and Grand Street.

== Final route ==
Station service legend
Stops all times	Stops 24 hours a day
Stops all times except late nights	Stops every day during daytime hours only
Stops late nights only	Stops every day during overnight hours only
Stops rush hours in the peak direction only	Stops during weekday rush hours in the peak direction only
Time period details
Disabled access	Station is compliant with the Americans with Disabilities Act
↑	Station is compliant with the Americans with Disabilities Act in the indicated direction only
↓	Station is compliant with the Americans with Disabilities Act in the indicated direction only
	Elevator access to mezzanine only

Grand Street Shuttle	Stations	Disabled access	Subway transfers	Connections
Manhattan
Stops all times	West Fourth Street–Washington Square	Disabled access	F V (IND Sixth Avenue Line); A C E (IND Eighth Avenue Line)	PATH at Ninth Street
Stops all times	Broadway–Lafayette Street	Disabled access	F V (IND Sixth Avenue Line); 4 6 <6> (IRT Lexington Avenue Line at Bleecker Street)	
Stops all times	Grand Street			
