= Lexington Avenue–63rd Street station =

New York City Subway station in Manhattan

Lexington Avenue–63 Street
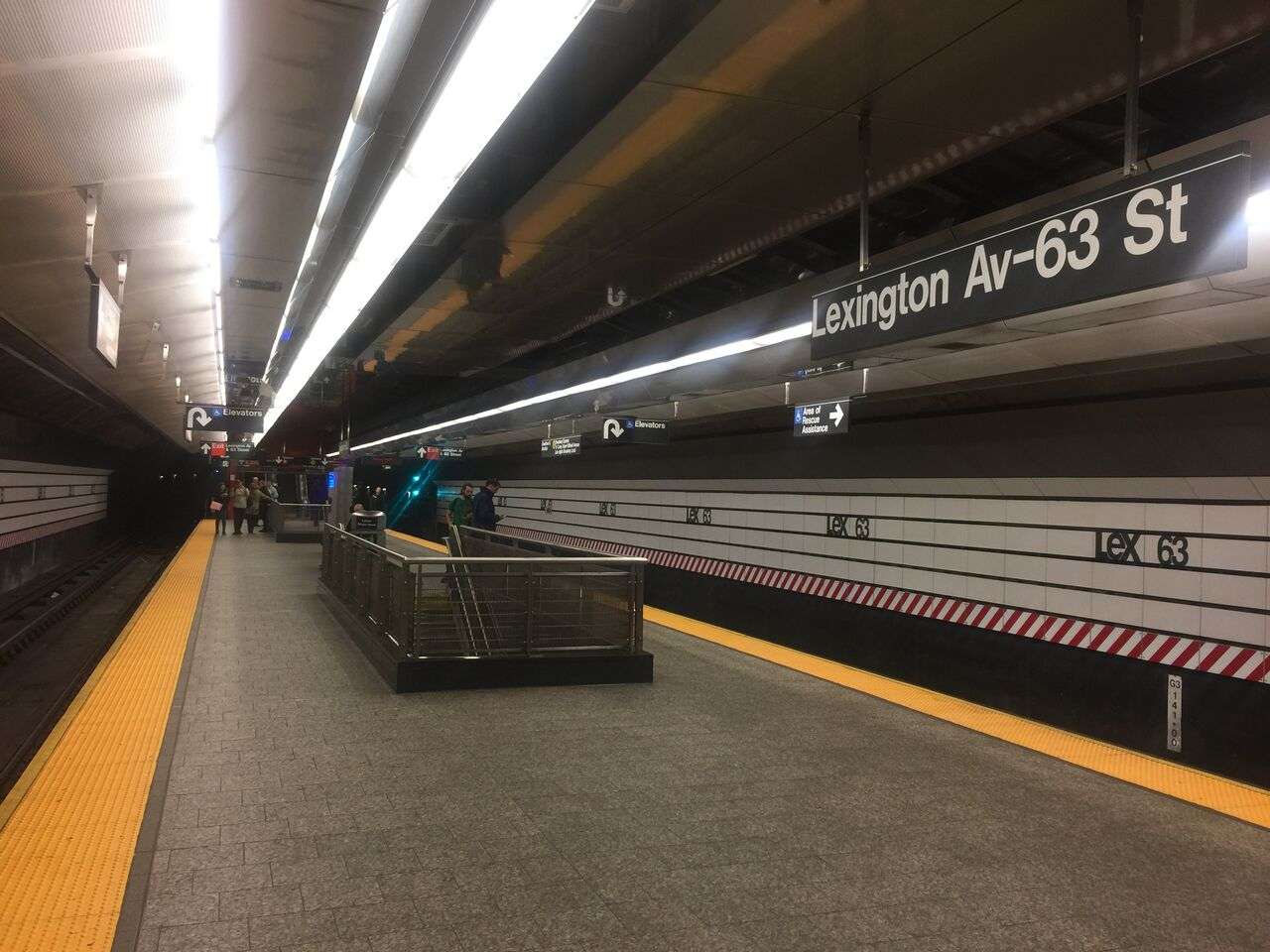
- Upper platform

Station statistics
- Address: Lexington Avenue & East 63rd Street; New York, New York
- Borough: Manhattan
- Locale: Upper East Side, Lenox Hill
- Coordinates: 40.764649°N 73.966398°W
- Division: B (BMT/IND)
- Line: BMT 63rd Street Line; IND 63rd Street Line
- Services: F (late nights and weekends); M (weekdays during the day); N (limited weekday rush hour service only); Q (all times); R (one a.m. rush hour trip in the northbound direction only)
- System transfers: With OMNY only: 4 (all times); 5 (all times except late nights); 6 (all times) <6> (weekdays until 8:45 p.m., peak direction); N (all times); R (all times except late nights); W (weekdays only) at Lexington Avenue/59th Street (Transfer stations are not accessible)
- Transit: NYCT Bus: M101, M102, M103; MTA Bus: BxM1
- Structure: Underground
- Depth: 155 feet (47 m)
- Levels: 2
- Platforms: 2 island platforms (1 on each level) cross-platform interchange
- Tracks: 4 (2 on each level)

Other information
- Opened: October 29, 1989; 37 years ago
- Rebuilt: January 13, 2011; 15 years ago to January 1, 2017; 9 years ago (for Second Avenue Subway)
- Accessible: Yes
- Former/other names: Lexington Avenue

Traffic
- 2025: 4,573,167 ▲21.2%
- Rank: 66 out of 423
Services
Preceding station	New York City Subway	Following station
57th Street F M toward Middle Village–Metropolitan Avenue	M (New York City Subway service)	Roosevelt Island F M toward Forest Hills–71st Avenue
57th Street–Seventh Avenue N Q toward Coney Island–Stillwell Avenue	Q (New York City Subway service)	72nd Street N Q R toward 96th Street
Former services
Preceding station	New York City Subway	Following station
57th Street toward Howard Beach–JFK Airport	JFK Express	21st Street–Queensbridge Terminus
Location
Location within New York City Subway
Location within New York City
Location within New York
Track layout
Street map
Station service legend
Symbol	Description
Stops all times except late nights	Stops all times except late nights
Stops all times	Stops all times
Stops rush hours only (limited service)	Stops rush hours only (limited service)
Stops rush hours in the peak direction only (limited service)	Stops rush hours in the peak direction only (limited service)
Stops weekdays during the day	Stops weekdays during the day
Stops late nights and weekends	Stops late nights and weekends

The Lexington Avenue–63rd Street station (formerly Lexington Avenue) is a New York City Subway local station in Lenox Hill, Manhattan, shared by the IND and BMT 63rd Street Lines. Located at the intersection of Lexington Avenue and 63rd Street, it is served by Q trains at all times; M trains on weekdays during the day; F trains during weekends and nights; limited rush hour N trains; and one A.M. rush hour R train in the northbound direction only.

The station has two platform levels; trains headed southbound to downtown and Brooklyn use the upper level, while trains headed northbound to uptown and Queens use the lower level. This is one of the deepest stations in the subway system, requiring several banks of long escalators or elevators.

Construction started at this station in 1969, but as a result of the New York City fiscal crisis in 1975, the station did not open until 1989. Originally, the station was intended to be a transfer point for Sixth Avenue/Queens Boulevard and Broadway/Second Avenue services. As such, the station was designed to allow for cross-platform interchanges on both levels. However, construction of the Second Avenue Subway was halted in 1975 during the station's construction. As a result, the north side of the station, intended for service to Second Avenue, was hidden with a temporary orange brick wall, and space intended for an exit at Third Avenue was left unused. While the south side of the station opened for service in 1989, the north side was used only for storing trains.

In 2007, construction resumed on the Second Avenue Subway, and the north side of the station was renovated so it could be used. The orange wall on the platform was removed, while beige-white wall tiles were installed on the station walls adjacent to the tracks. The unopened entrance at Third Avenue was fitted with multiple elevators, and the station's false ceiling was removed. The first phase of the Second Avenue Subway opened on January 1, 2017, and ridership has increased at the station since then.

== History ==
=== Construction ===
The current 63rd Street lines were the final version of proposals for a northern midtown tunnel from the IND Queens Boulevard Line to the Second and Sixth Avenue Lines, which date back to the IND Second System of the 1920s and 1930s. The Second System was a plan to expand the city-owned and -operated Independent Subway System (IND), which often ran in direct competition with the two privately owned subway companies in the city, Interborough Rapid Transit (IRT) and Brooklyn-Manhattan Transit Corporation (BMT). As a result, the plan for the line only had it connect to two planned IND lines, the Second and Sixth Avenue Lines.

In 1940, the subway system was unified, with the IRT and the BMT coming under city control. Consequently, plans for the proposed line were modified. The current plans were drawn up in the 1960s under the Metropolitan Transportation Authority's Program For Action. Under this plan, the line was to connect to the IND Sixth Avenue and BMT Broadway Lines. The IND line was to be built on the upper portion of the bi-level 63rd Street Tunnel, which would run under the East River. On the south side of the station are the IND 63rd Street Line tracks, which continue from the IND Sixth Avenue Line, while on the north side of the station are the BMT 63rd Street Line tracks, which continue from the BMT Broadway Line. Directly to the west of the station is a crossover to facilitate a connection between the BMT and IND lines.

Construction on the 63rd Street Line, including the Lexington Avenue–63rd Street station, began on November 25, 1969. The station was built using a combination of cut-and-cover construction and tunneling machines. After the construction of the Second Avenue Subway ceased in 1975 due to the city's severe fiscal crisis, the BMT 63rd Street Line side, the northern tracks, basically led to a non-existent subway line. The BMT side was abandoned and walled off with a temporary orange brick wall, and a false ceiling was placed on the upper level's IND 63rd Street Line side, the southern side. Finishing touches were only applied to the IND side of the station. The tracks on the closed-off BMT side were used only to store trains outside of rush hour.

The remainder of the project faced extensive delays. As early as 1976, the Program for Action had been reduced to seven stations on the Archer Avenue and 63rd Street lines and was not projected to be complete for another decade. By October 1980, officials considered stopping construction on the 63rd Street line. The MTA voted in 1984 to connect the Queens end of the tunnel to the local tracks of the IND Queens Boulevard Line at a cost of $222 million. The section of the line up to Long Island City was projected to open by the end of 1985, but flooding in the tunnel caused the opening to be delayed indefinitely. The MTA's contractors concluded in February 1987 that the tunnel was structurally sound, and the federal government's contractors affirmed this finding in June 1987.

=== Original station opens ===
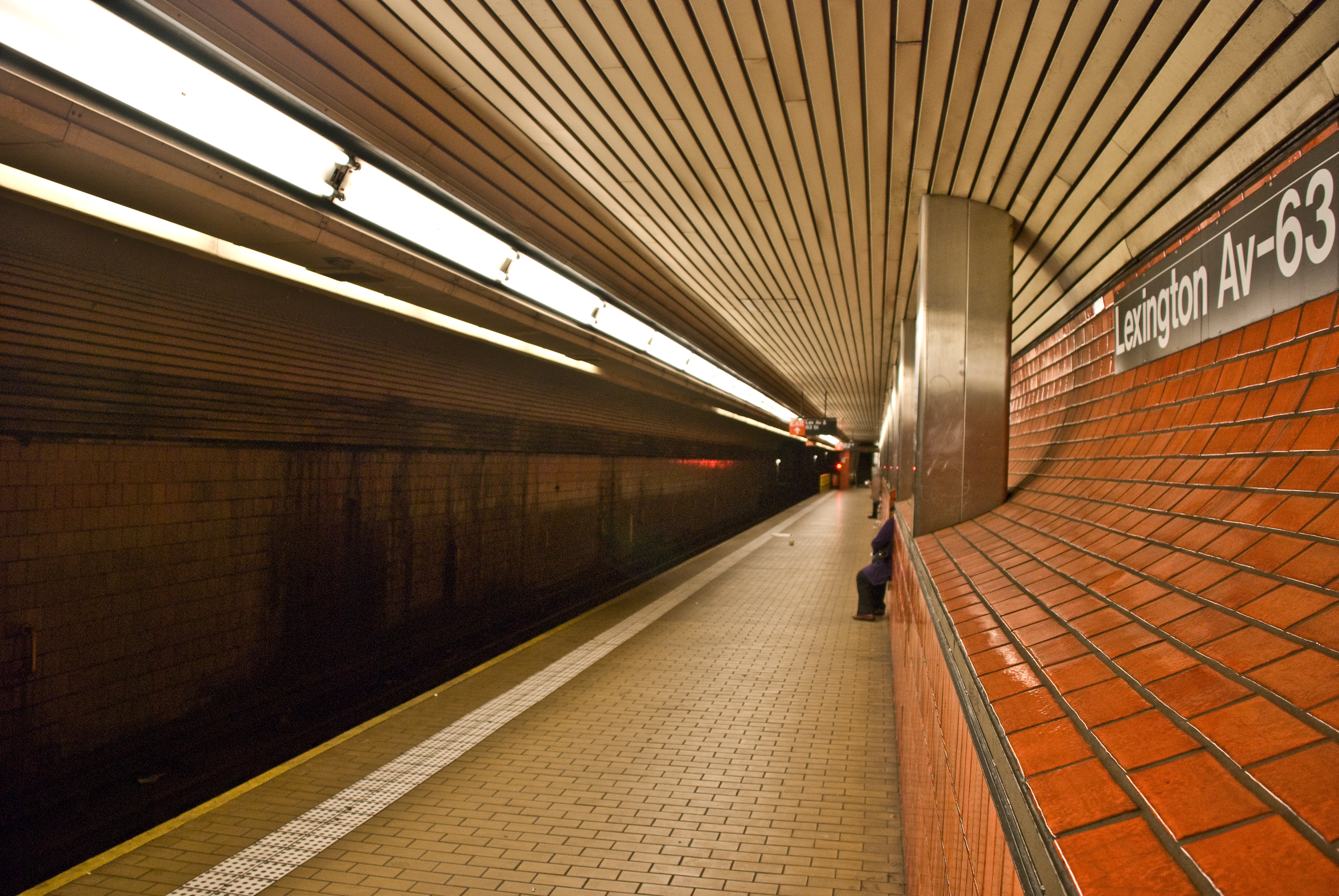
Upper platform in 2008, before reconstruction for a connection to the Second Avenue Subway

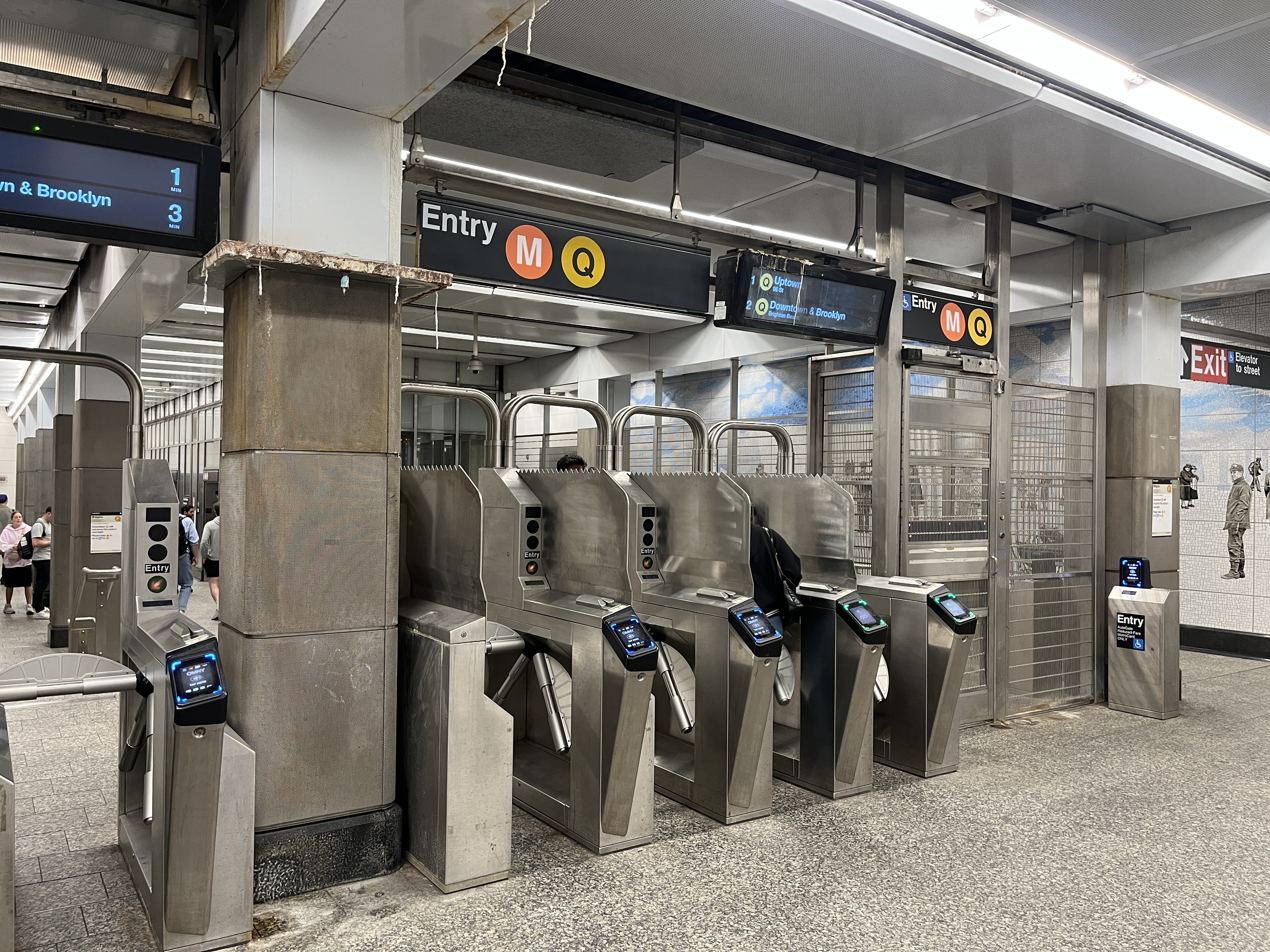
Eastern fare control

The IND side of the station, the southern side, had been completed in 1984, when it was named the Construction Achievement Project of the Year by the Metropolitan Section of the American Society of Civil Engineers. It opened for passenger service on October 29, 1989, along with the rest of the IND 63rd Street Line. Upon the station's opening, it operated as a typical one-track, one-side platform station on each level, with only the IND side in use, while the BMT side of each level was hidden beyond an orange tiled false wall. Switches on both levels connected the lines to the west of the station.

East of this station on the IND side are turnouts heading southwest for a connection to Phase 3 of the Second Avenue Subway, clearly visible from a moving train, which would allow future service from Queens towards Midtown and Downtown Manhattan. Also to the east, the eastbound track of the IND line rises to the upper level of the tunnel, as both IND tracks are located on the upper level of 63rd Street Tunnel for the trip under the East River. The two tracks on the lower level of that tunnel are being connected to the Long Island Rail Road (LIRR) via the East Side Access project. The project brings trains from the LIRR's Main Line to Grand Central Terminal. The lower tunnels eventually opened in January 2023, after years of delays.

East of this station on the BMT side, the planned track connections to the Second Avenue Subway curved slightly north. After the tracks ended, the roadbed went on for a few hundred feet before ending. With the Second Avenue Subway connection, these tunnels now merge into the tunnels of Phase 1 of the IND Second Avenue Line.

=== Expansion for the Second Avenue Subway ===
In 2007, the Second Avenue Subway resumed construction. As part of the project, the station was to undergo renovation to finish the BMT side, which would serve Second Avenue Line trains. The renovation included installation of new platform staircases, new wall tiles, new columns and column cladding, new platform pavings, new entrances/exits, new low-vibration track, and new mechanical, electrical, plumbing, fire protection, and communication systems. The contract for renovation of the station was awarded to Judlau Contracting on January 13, 2011.

On September 22, 2011, a Second Avenue Subway tunnel-boring machine completed its run to the Lexington Avenue–63rd Street station's bellmouth from 92nd Street and Second Avenue. Controlled blasting for the section of tunnel between Third Avenue/63rd Street and Second Avenue/65th Street was completed in March 2012.

The orange false walls at platform level were removed in 2012 as part of construction, but the orange tiles at the Lexington Avenue mezzanine, as well as on the corridors to platform level, were kept for the time being. In spring 2012, temporary blue walls separating most of the IND and BMT sides were erected for the duration of construction. Both sides had large white and grey panels on the track side, as well as "temporary" tiles that said "Lex 63" at regular intervals. This differed vastly from the small beige tiles that were on the IND side of the tracks from 1989 to 2013. New platform signs for the Second Avenue Subway were erected in December 2016.

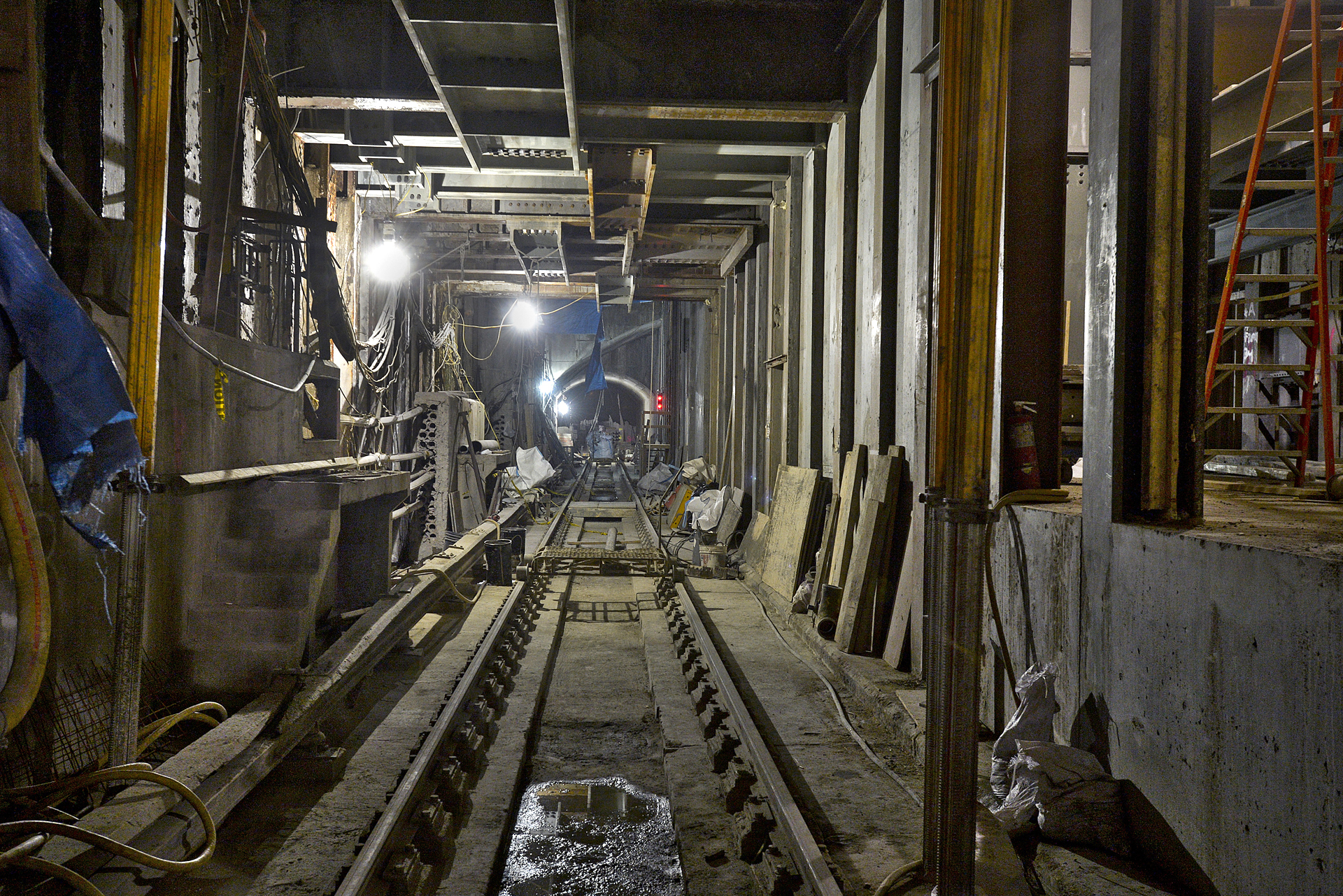
Unused tracks on BMT side under construction in 2013

When the contract was awarded, renovation was estimated to be finished by May 2014, but the completion date had been pushed back constantly, and as of August 2015, the completion date was Spring 2016, though this was later pushed back to Summer 2016. As of July 2015, the renovation was 90% complete, and as of June 2016, 98% complete with only cosmetic finishes and power upgrades to be completed.

To accommodate the increased patronage expected after the beginning of Second Avenue Subway service, the MTA built four new entrances at the intersection of Third Avenue and 63rd Street, leading to a new mezzanine at the eastern end of the station. Passengers travel between the new mezzanine and the platforms using four high-speed elevators, similar to the layout of several other deep-level stations. These elevators are the most space-efficient means of transporting people. These entrances opened on December 30, 2016. The MTA inaugurated Phase 1 of Second Avenue Subway service on January 1, 2017. In 2024, Skanska was hired to replace 21 escalators across the New York City Subway system for $146 million, including 10 escalators at the Lexington Avenue–63rd Street station. Three of the new escalators opened in April 2026.

== Service history ==
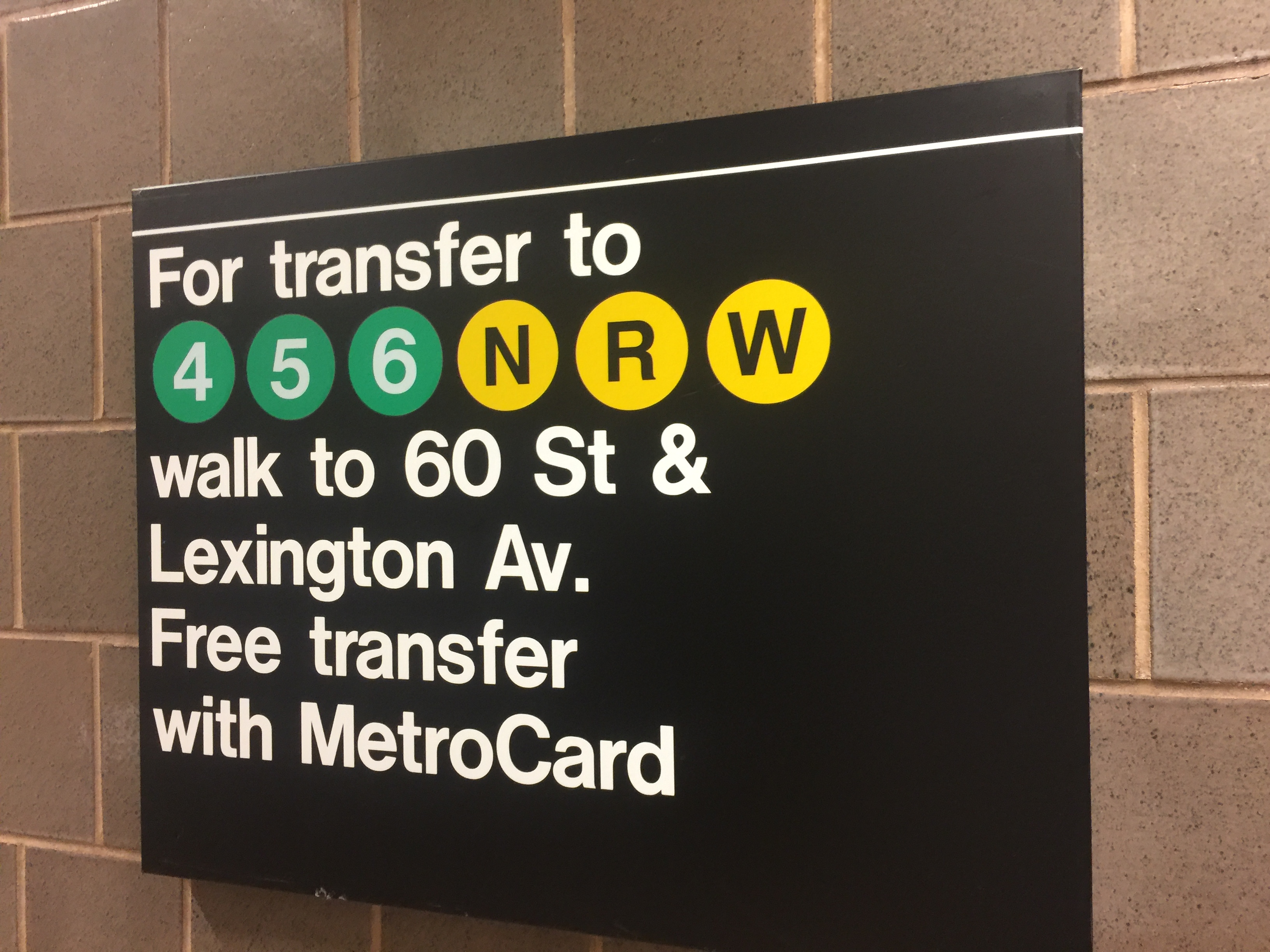
Old station sign describing the out-of-system transfer to Lexington Avenue–59th Street station.

This station opened on October 29, 1989, along with the entire IND 63rd Street Line. The Q train served the station on weekdays and the B train stopped there on weekends and late nights; both services used the Sixth Avenue Line. For the first couple of months after the station opened, the JFK Express to Kennedy Airport also served the station until it was discontinued on April 15, 1990. The tunnel had gained notoriety as the "tunnel to nowhere" both during its planning and after its opening, with 21st Street being the line's only stop in Queens.

On July 22, 2001, concurrent with the closure of the IND Sixth Avenue Line tracks of the Manhattan Bridge, B and Q train service to this station ceased and was replaced with a full-time shuttle. At this time, the northern tracks of the bridge were closed to allow for bridge repairs to take place. The southern BMT Broadway Line tracks were reopened allowing for half of the tracks on the bridge to remain open. On December 16, 2001, the 63rd Street Connector, which was built to connect the IND 63rd Street Line and the IND Queens Boulevard Line officially opened; with this opening, the F train was rerouted to serve this station at all times. When this happened, a free MetroCard (since superseded by OMNY) out-of-system transfer to the Lexington Avenue–59th Street station was added. This was to provide a transfer to the IRT Lexington Avenue Line for F train customers as such a connection had been provided at the Lexington Avenue–53rd Street station along the previous routing of the F train.

The MTA's plans for Second Avenue Subway service extended the Q train (and selected rush-hour N train short turn trips), running via the BMT Broadway Line, along the BMT 63rd Street Line to serve this station, beyond which the trains turn north and run along the Second Avenue Line to 96th Street. This new service pattern was put into effect on January 1, 2017.

From August 28, 2023, to April 1, 2024, F trains were rerouted via the 53rd Street Tunnel between Queens and Manhattan due to track replacement and other repairs in the 63rd Street Tunnel, and an F shuttle train ran between Lexington Avenue-63rd Street and 21st Street–Queensbridge at all times except late nights, stopping at Roosevelt Island. On December 8, 2025, the M train began serving the station on weekdays during the day, running via the 63rd Street Tunnel. The F train began running via the 53rd Street Tunnel during the day, operating via the 63rd Street Tunnel during weekends and nights.

== Station layout ==
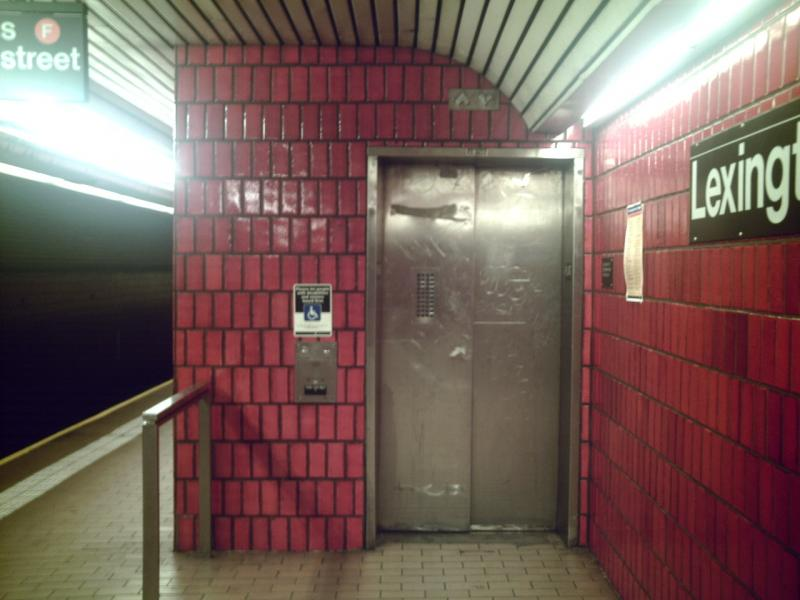

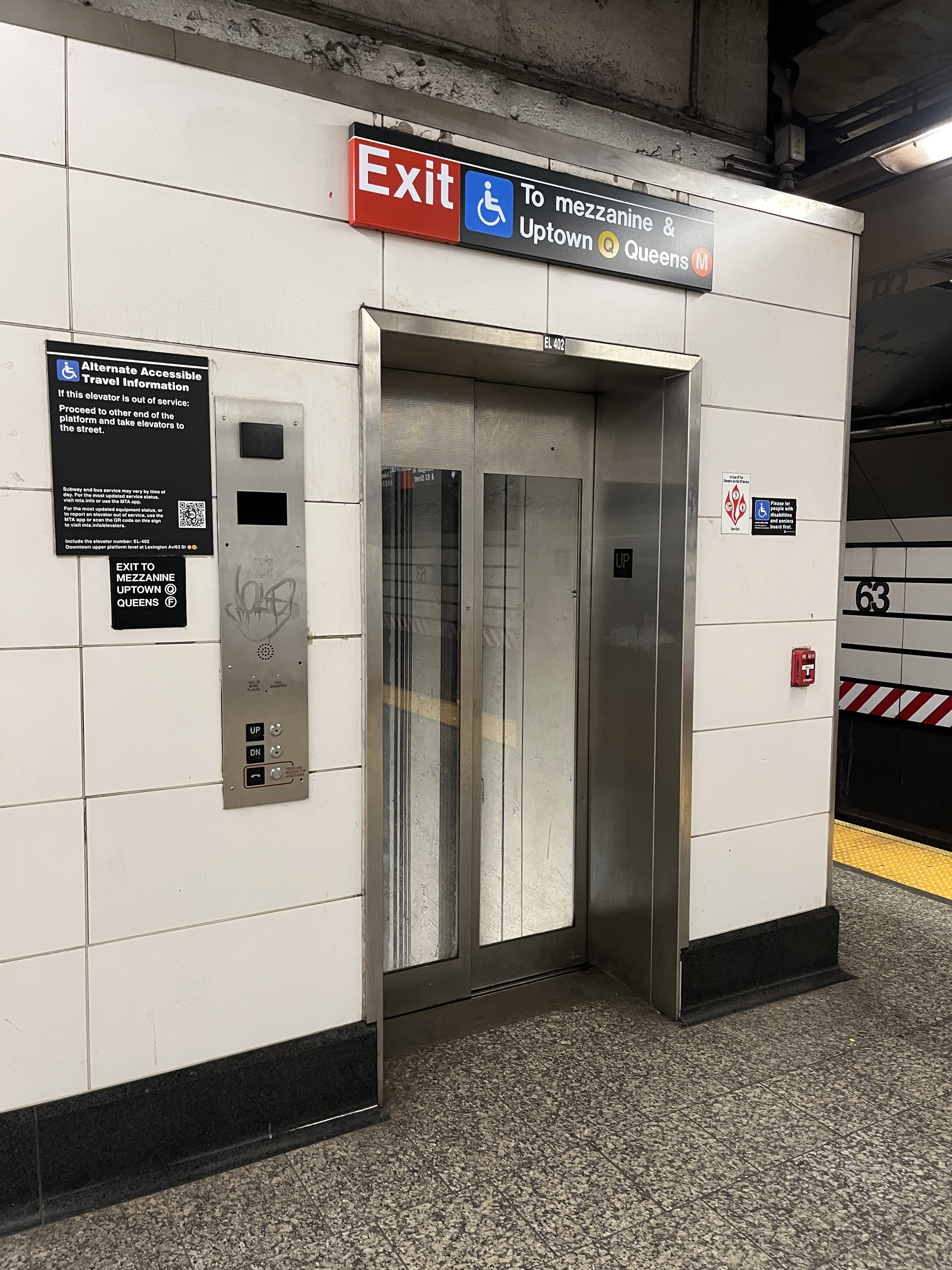
Elevator to Lexington Avenue on the upper platform, before renovation (top) and after renovation (bottom)

The Q train serves the station at all times. The M train serves the station on weekdays during the day, while the F train serves the station during weekends and nights. In addition, limited rush-hour N trains and one northbound AM rush-hour R train serve the station. The next station to the north is Roosevelt Island for F and M trains and 72nd Street for N, Q, and R trains, while the next station to the south is 57th Street for F and M trains and 57th Street–Seventh Avenue for N and Q trains.

From the Lexington Avenue entrance, there are two short escalators and a stair from the northwest corner, a staircase from the southwest corner, and a short elevator hidden around the corner from the escalators. As with other stations constructed as part of the Program for Action, the Lexington Avenue–63rd Street station contained technologically advanced features such as air-cooling, noise insulation, CCTV monitors, public announcement systems, electronic platform signage, and escalator and elevator entrances. From the fare control, there are two long escalators and a stair to an intermediate level, and then two shorter escalators and a pair of stairs to a lower mezzanine. Here, the bank splits and there are two separate tubes of two escalators and a stair each to each platform.

Lexington Avenue–63rd Street is a deep-level station; its upper and lower levels are about 140 feet (43 m) and 155 feet (47 m) deep respectively, making the station among the system's deepest. This depth is because it has to go under the IRT Lexington Avenue Line and other existing infrastructure, in addition to the IND tunnels having to go under the East River a short distance to the east. At the original (1989) mezzanine at Lexington Avenue, there are a total of eight escalators, four staircases and two elevators from the fare mezzanine to platform level. There is an in-building entrance with two escalators and a staircase, and another, stand-alone entrance with a staircase, from the street to the Lexington Avenue fare mezzanine. Two additional staircases between the platform levels are at the eastern end of platforms, past the elevator. A third staircase between the platform levels has been constructed.

An eastern mezzanine at Third Avenue, along with stairwells to the platforms, was partially completed in the 1980s but not opened along with the rest of the station. A shaftway, identical to the one on the Lexington Avenue side, contained a single stairway, as well as beams that may have been intended to support escalators. The stairway led up to an upper mezzanine whose street entrance was sealed off. This area was renovated as part of the Second Avenue Subway construction, and the shaftway was demolished. The new entrances constructed for the Second Avenue Subway added two new staircases, two new escalators, and five new elevators (one elevator from street level to mezzanine, and four elevators from the mezzanine to the platforms). As of April 2016, the new entrances, escalators, and elevators had been completed. The bank of four elevators leads from the Third Avenue mezzanine to both platform levels at the eastern ends of both platforms, replacing the originally planned escalators, as they use the space more effectively. On each platform level, both waiting areas have a piece of the Jean Shin artwork "Elevated." The Third Avenue entrance and mezzanine opened on December 30, 2016.

=== Artwork ===
When this station was opened in 1989, it had no artwork. During the Second Avenue Subway renovations, Jean Shin created an artwork called Elevated as part of the MTA Arts & Design program.

Shin used archival photographs of the 2nd and 3rd Avenue Elevated trains (known as els) to create compositions in ceramic tile, glass mosaic, and laminated glass. The imagery is manipulated and re-configured with each level having a different design. On the south east-corner entrance at Third Avenue, there are ceramic tiles depicting construction beams and the cranes that dismantled the el. At the mezzanine, a mosaic reveals the sky where the train had previously been present. The platform level features semi-transparent and reflective glass depicting vintage scenes of the neighborhood.

=== Exits ===
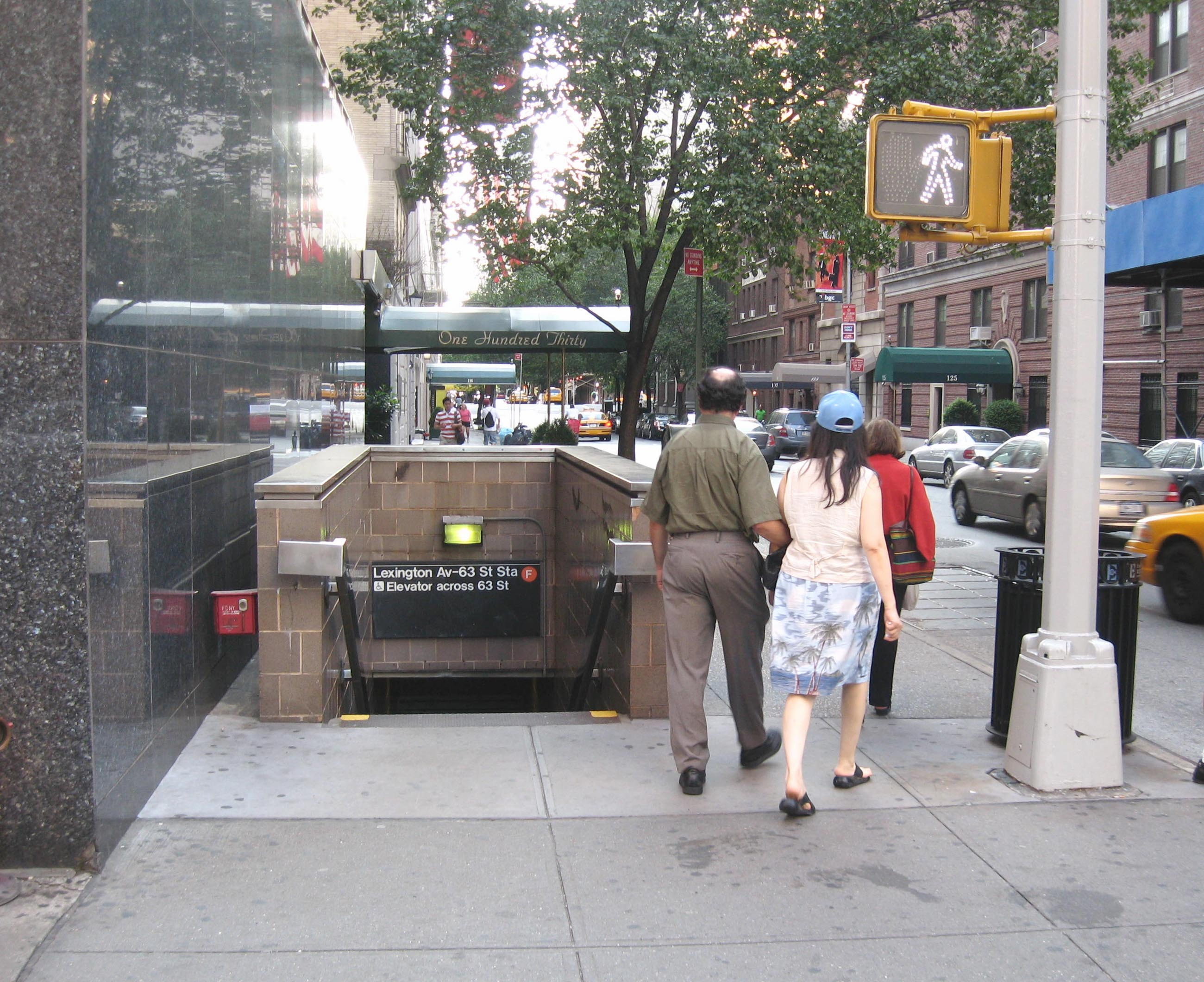
1989 outdoor station entrance at Lexington Avenue and 63rd Street

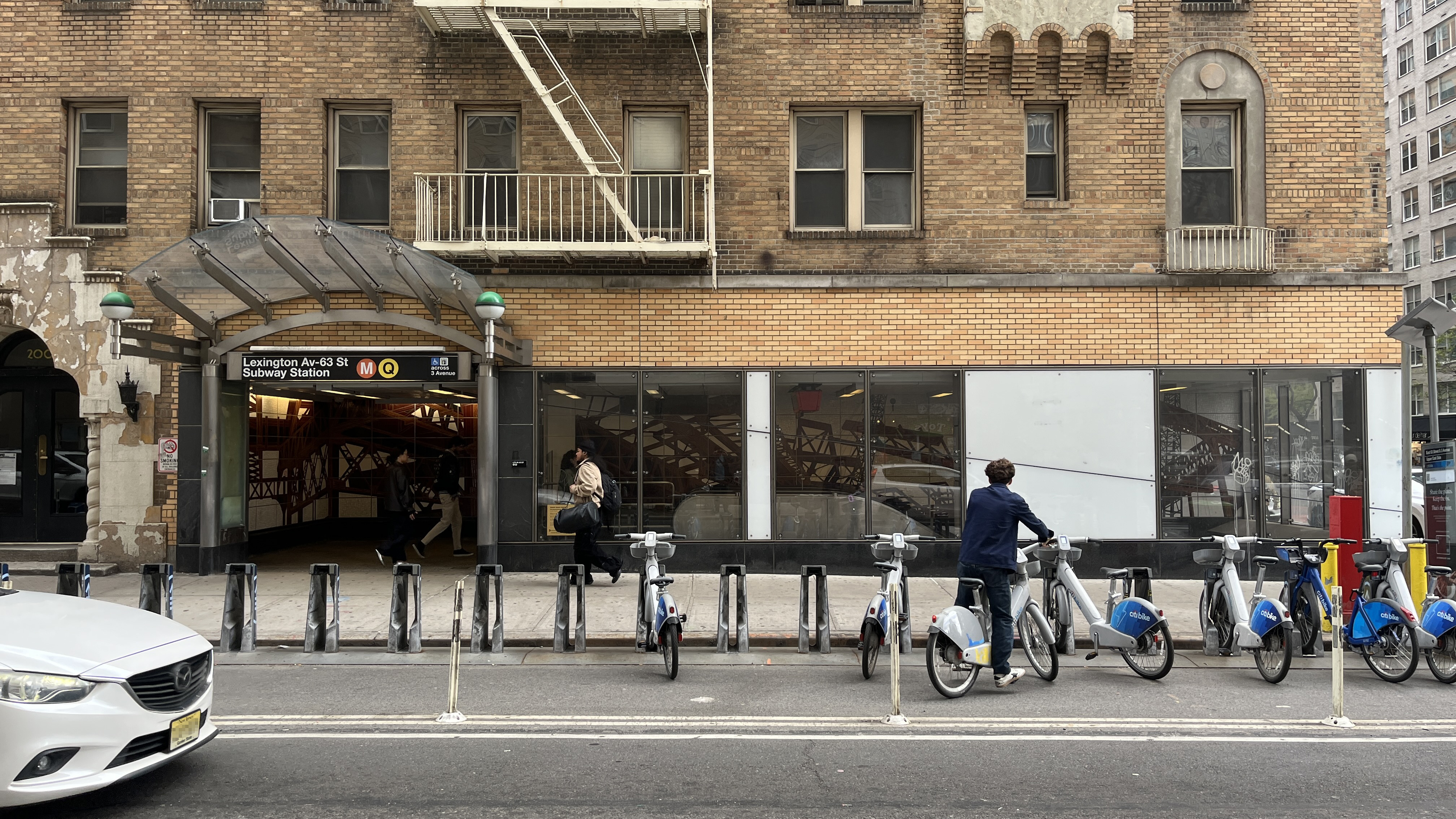
2017 in-building station entrance at 3rd Avenue and 63rd Street

There are 3 exits leading to Lexington Avenue that were built as part of the original 1989 station, along with 4 exits to Third Avenue that were built as part of the Second Avenue Subway. The elevator between the street level and mezzanine at Lexington Avenue was replaced in August 2015.

Exit location	Exit Type	Number of exits
Within building, NW corner of Lexington Avenue and 63rd Street	Escalator and Staircase	1 staircase 2 escalators (1 up, 1 down)
Next to 135 E 63rd Street; NW corner of Lexington Avenue and 63rd Street	Elevator	1
SW corner of Lexington Avenue and 63rd Street	Staircase	1
Entrance 1 Within building at SE corner of Third Avenue and 63rd Street	Escalators	2 escalators (1 up, 1 down)
Entrance 2 NW corner of Third Avenue and 63rd Street	Elevator	1
Entrance 3 NE corner of Third Avenue and 63rd Street	Staircase	1
Entrance 4 SW corner of Third Avenue and 63rd Street	Staircase	1

=== Ancillary buildings ===
This station has two ancillary buildings. Ancillary 1 is at 124 East 63rd Street, and Ancillary 2 is on the north side of 63rd Street between Third and Lexington Avenues.

== Ridership ==
In 2016, before the Second Avenue Subway opened, the station had 5,033,950 boardings, making it the 93rd most used station in the 422-station system. This amounted to an average of 16,988 passengers per weekday. After the Second Avenue Subway opened, there was a combined average of 28,150 boardings and transfers every weekday. In 2024, Lexington Avenue–63rd Street recorded 4,573,167 entries, ranking number 66 of 425 stations.
