= QBL =

QBL may refer to:

- IND Queens Boulevard Line, line of the New York City Subway
- NBL1 North, basketball league in Australia previously known as Queensland Basketball League (QBL)
