= 60th Street Tunnel Connection =

New York City Subway track connection

The 60th Street Tunnel Connection or 11th Street Cut is a short rapid transit line of the New York City Subway, within the Long Island City neighborhood in Queens. It connects the 60th Street Tunnel under the East River (which connects to the BMT Broadway Line in Manhattan) with the IND Queens Boulevard Line west of Queens Plaza. The 11th Street Connection name comes from the street above the split from the 60th Street Tunnel. The line does not have any stations, and carries R trains at all times but late nights.

== History ==
The connection opened on December 1, 1955, and permitted BMT trains from Brooklyn to use the IND Queens Boulevard Line; the first service to do so was the Brighton Beach Local via Tunnel (1, now Q). This connection allowed for an increase of 20 trains per hour on Queens Boulevard. Unlike the later Chrystie Street Connection, this was of the nature of a trackage rights operation, without the mixing of BMT and IND equipment or crews, as opposed to a true operating integration.

=== Service history ===
The first service to use the connection was the daytime 1 local via Montague Street Tunnel, which became the QT in the early 1960s. The QT was rerouted to Astoria–Ditmars Boulevard on January 1, 1961, and the RR was sent through the connection during daytime hours. The EE was created on November 26, 1967, when the Chrystie Street Connection opened and the RR moved back to Astoria. On August 27, 1976, the N was extended through the connection, absorbing the EE; this change sent late night and weekend trains through the tunnel for the first time. The N and R were swapped in Queens on May 24, 1987, taking the R through the connection in a move that reassigned a former BMT route (the R) to the IND's Jamaica Yard (it had heretofore used the Coney Island Yard). Late night service was later truncated to 36th Street in Brooklyn, then later extended to Whitehall Street in Manhattan. The connection is not being used during late nights as of May 2022.

== Routing ==
Station service legend
Stops all times	Stops 24 hours a day
Stops all times except late nights	Stops every day during daytime hours only
Stops weekdays during the day	Stops during weekday daytime hours only
Time period details
Disabled access	Station is compliant with the Americans with Disabilities Act
↑	Station is compliant with the Americans with Disabilities Act in the indicated direction only
↓	Station is compliant with the Americans with Disabilities Act in the indicated direction only
	Elevator access to mezzanine only

Disabled access	Station	Tracks	Services	Opened	Notes
begins as a split from the IND Queens Boulevard Line local tracks south of Queens Plaza
	(no stations)	local	R	December 1, 1955	
merges with the BMT Astoria Line (N W ) south of Queensboro Plaza and enters the 60th Street Tunnel as the BMT Broadway Line local tracks
