= 60th Street Tunnel =

Tunnel under the East River in New York City

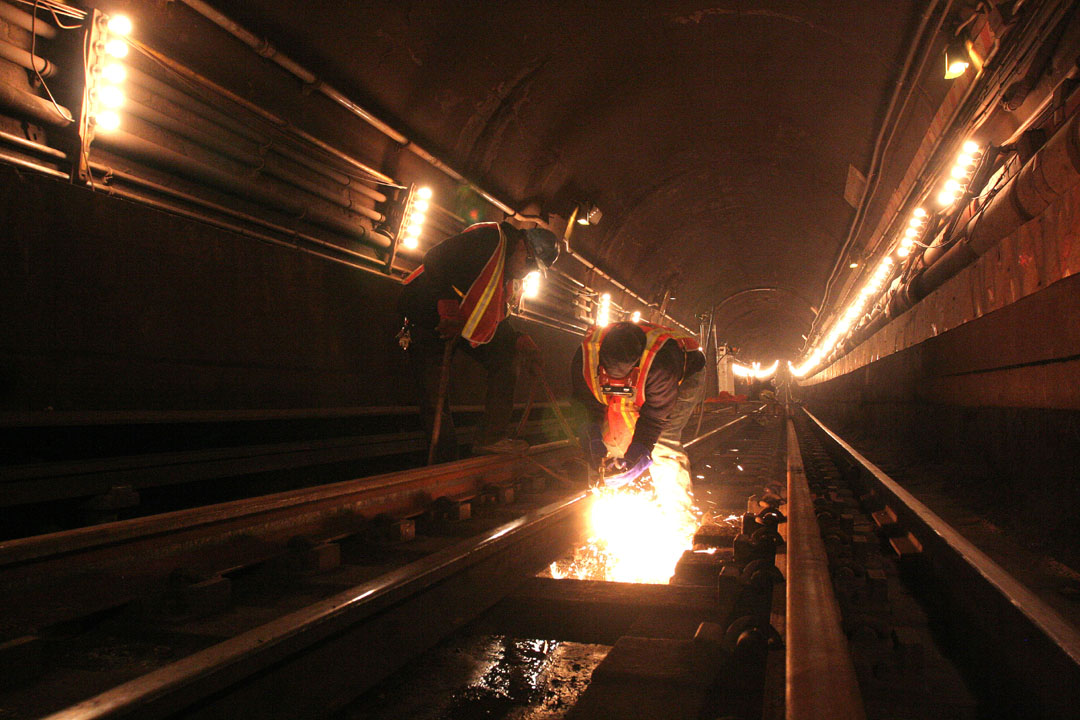
- Installing continuously welded rail in the tunnel
- Interactive map of 60th Street Tunnel

Overview
- Line: BMT Broadway Line (N, R, and W trains)
- Location: East River between Manhattan and Queens (New York City)
- Coordinates: 40.760732°N 73.963308°W
- System: New York City Subway

Operation
- Opened: August 1, 1920; 105 years ago
- Operator: Metropolitan Transportation Authority

Technical
- No. of tracks: 2

The 60th Street Tunnel carries the N, R, and W trains of the New York City Subway under the East River and Roosevelt Island between Manhattan and Queens.

== History ==
=== Construction and opening ===
The tunnel was built as part of the Dual Contracts, which expanded the current New York City Subway system greatly. The original plan provided for trackage over the Queensboro Bridge, which spans the East River from about 59th Street in Manhattan to Queens Plaza in Queens. However, an investigation made following the 1907 collapse of the Quebec Bridge determined that the bridge would not be able to handle the additional weight of subway trains; thus, the tunnel was constructed to the north. Clifford Milburn Holland served as the engineer-in-charge. On October 14, 1918, the tunnel was holed through near the Manhattan bank of the East River. Work on the tunnel was being completed by P. McGovern & Company for $4,194,797. At the time, it was expected that the tunnel would be completed in early 1919. The tunnel was the deepest of the five new East River tunnels, being over 100 feet (30 m) deep in sections. A false bottom was placed in the river over some sections of tunneling work due to the very high level of air pressure needed.

The tunnel opened to revenue service on Sunday, August 1, 1920, at 2 a.m. with a holiday schedule, along with the Montague Street Tunnel and the rest of the BMT Broadway Line. Regular service began the following day. The two new tunnels allowed passengers to make an 18-mile (29 km) trip from Coney Island, through Manhattan, to Queens for a 5 cent fare. The original construction cost was $5,617,008.97.

=== Later years ===
Originally, the tunnel only connected the BMT Broadway Line to the Queensboro Plaza station, where trains terminated, and passengers could transfer to elevated trains to continue along either the BMT Astoria Line or the IRT Flushing Line (both of which handled only the narrower elevated trains). After 1949, service patterns were changed so that all BMT trains ran over the Astoria Line and all IRT trains on the Flushing Line. Before that change, the platform edges had to be shaved back to fit the wider BMT subway trains. In 1955, the 60th Street Tunnel Connection opened, allowing Broadway trains to connect to the local tracks of the IND Queens Boulevard Line at Queens Plaza. This track connection is currently utilized by the R train; the N and W trains continue to use the original connection to Queensboro Plaza.

In 1983, as part of the MTA's first Capital Program, it was announced that work was required to keep the 60th Street Tunnel in a state of good repair. Work on the $34 million project started in November 1990. On July 27, 1992, N and R trains began running through the tunnel at normal speed – 40 to 45 mph (64 to 72 km/h) – after two years of work. During the project, trains went through the tunnel at 10 mph (16 km/h), and weekend and late night service was shut down. Ridership decreased from 225,000 to 160,000 daily riders. The tunnel remained closed during late nights for another year so that ventilation and water control improvements could be made.
