= Queens Plaza station =

New York City Subway station in Queens

Queens Plaza
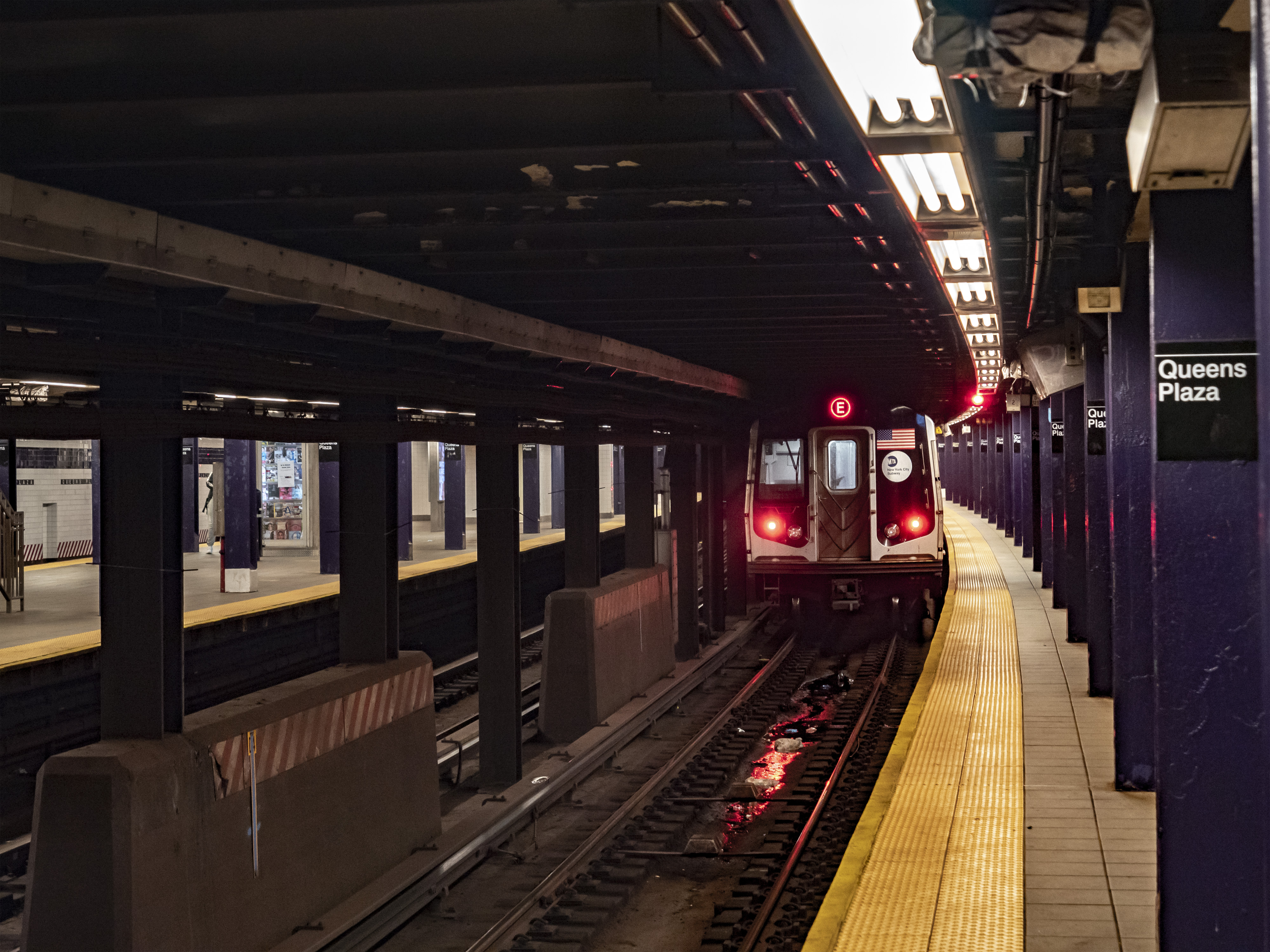
- R160 E train departing the northbound platform

Station statistics
- Address: Queens Plaza, Jackson Avenue, Queens Boulevard & Northern Boulevard; Queens, New York
- Borough: Queens
- Locale: Long Island City
- Coordinates: 40.748915°N 73.937387°W
- Division: B (IND)
- Line: IND Queens Boulevard Line
- Services: E (all times); F (weekday) <F> (two rush hour trains, peak direction); R (all times except late nights)
- Transit: NYCT Bus: Q39; MTA Bus: Q32, Q60, Q63, Q66, Q69, Q100, Q101, Q102
- Structure: Underground
- Platforms: 2 island platforms cross-platform interchange
- Tracks: 4

Other information
- Opened: August 19, 1933; 93 years ago
- Accessible: Yes

Traffic
- 2025: 4,067,662 ▼3%
- Rank: 85 out of 423
Services
| Preceding station | New York City Subway | Following station |
|---|---|---|
| Court Square–23rd Street E F <F> via Fifth Avenue/53rd Street | Express | Jackson Heights–Roosevelt Avenue E F <F> via Forest Hills–71st Avenue |
| Lexington Avenue–59th Street R toward Bay Ridge–95th Street | Local | 36th Street E R toward Forest Hills–71st Avenue |
Non-revenue services and lines
| Preceding station | New York City Subway | Following station |
|---|---|---|
| Court Square Crosstown | no service | |
Location
Location within New York City Subway
Location within New York City
Location within New York
Track layout
Street map
Station service legend
| Symbol | Description |
| Stops all times except late nights | Stops all times except late nights |
| Stops all times | Stops all times |
| Stops late nights only | Stops late nights only |
| Stops weekdays during the day | Stops weekdays during the day |

The Queens Plaza station is an express station on the IND Queens Boulevard Line of the New York City Subway. Located under the eastern edge of Queens Plaza at the large Queens Plaza interchange, it is served by the E train at all times, the R train at all times except late nights, the F train on weekdays during the day, and the <F> train during rush hours in the reverse peak direction.

While situated relatively close to the elevated Queensboro Plaza station on the BMT Astoria Line and IRT Flushing Line, there is no free transfer between the two stations.

== History ==
The Queens Boulevard Line was one of the first lines built by the city-owned Independent Subway System (IND), and stretches between the IND Eighth Avenue Line in Manhattan and 179th Street and Hillside Avenue in Jamaica, Queens. The Queens Boulevard Line was in part financed by a Public Works Administration (PWA) loan and grant of $25 million. One of the proposed stations would have been located at Steinway Street.

The first section of the line, west from Roosevelt Avenue to 50th Street, opened on August 19, 1933. It was the first stop in Queens after crossing the East River for six years until the 1939 opening of 23rd Street–Ely Avenue.

Until the opening of the 60th Street Tunnel Connection in 1955 after the unification of the subway, only express trains in Queens ran to Manhattan; local trains were routed onto the IND Crosstown Line. This service pattern is no longer in use due to the opening of the 63rd Street track connector in 2001, and Crosstown Line trains now terminate one stop earlier at Court Square.

In 1978, the New York City Department of City Planning proposed making Queens Plaza into a large subway station complex. Queens Plaza would have been converted to a transfer station with the 63rd Street Line, which at that time was described as a "tunnel to nowhere" that did not connect with any other lines in Queens. The complex would also have had a retail center above it, as well as a transfer to the elevated Queensboro Plaza station. This was ultimately not constructed, and the 63rd Street connector was built instead, between the 21st Street-Queensbridge and 36th Street stations.

To speed up passenger flow, dozens of platform conductors were assigned to direct crowds at the Queens Plaza station during the late 1980s. In 2002, the Metropolitan Transportation Authority announced that elevators would be installed at the Queens Plaza station. The original elevators were replaced with new elevators in August 2025.

=== Service history ===
When the station opened, it was served by E trains running to Hudson Terminal (today's World Trade Center) in Manhattan, as well as GG trains on the IND Crosstown Line. The GG initially ran as a shuttle service between Queens Plaza and Nassau Avenue on the Crosstown Line. In 1940, F trains began serving the station, running via the newly opened IND Sixth Avenue Line.

When the 60th Street Tunnel Connection opened, the BMT 1 local (which became the QT in the early 1960s) started serving the station. Starting in 1961, the RR was sent through the connection during daytime hours; in 1967, it was replaced with the EE. From 1976, the N was extended through the connection, absorbing the EE;. The northern terminus of GG service was cut back to Queens Plaza during late nights in 1977. Effective May 6, 1985, use of double letters to indicate local service was discontinued, so the GG was relabeled G. The R, successor to the RR, began serving the station in 1987 after the N was rerouted in Queens.

On December 16, 2001, the connection to the IND 63rd Street Line opened, and the F was rerouted onto it. The new peak-hour V train was created to replace the F via 53rd Street while running local on Queens Boulevard, requiring the truncation of the G to Court Square during weekdays; as such, G trains did not serve the station during these times. On April 19, 2010, G service was permanently truncated to Court Square, and on June 27, 2010, V service was eliminated and replaced by the M train. On December 8, 2025, the F and <F> express trains began serving the station on weekdays during the day, running via the 53rd Street Tunnel. The M train began running via the 63rd Street Tunnel during weekdays when it runs to Queens.

== Station layout ==
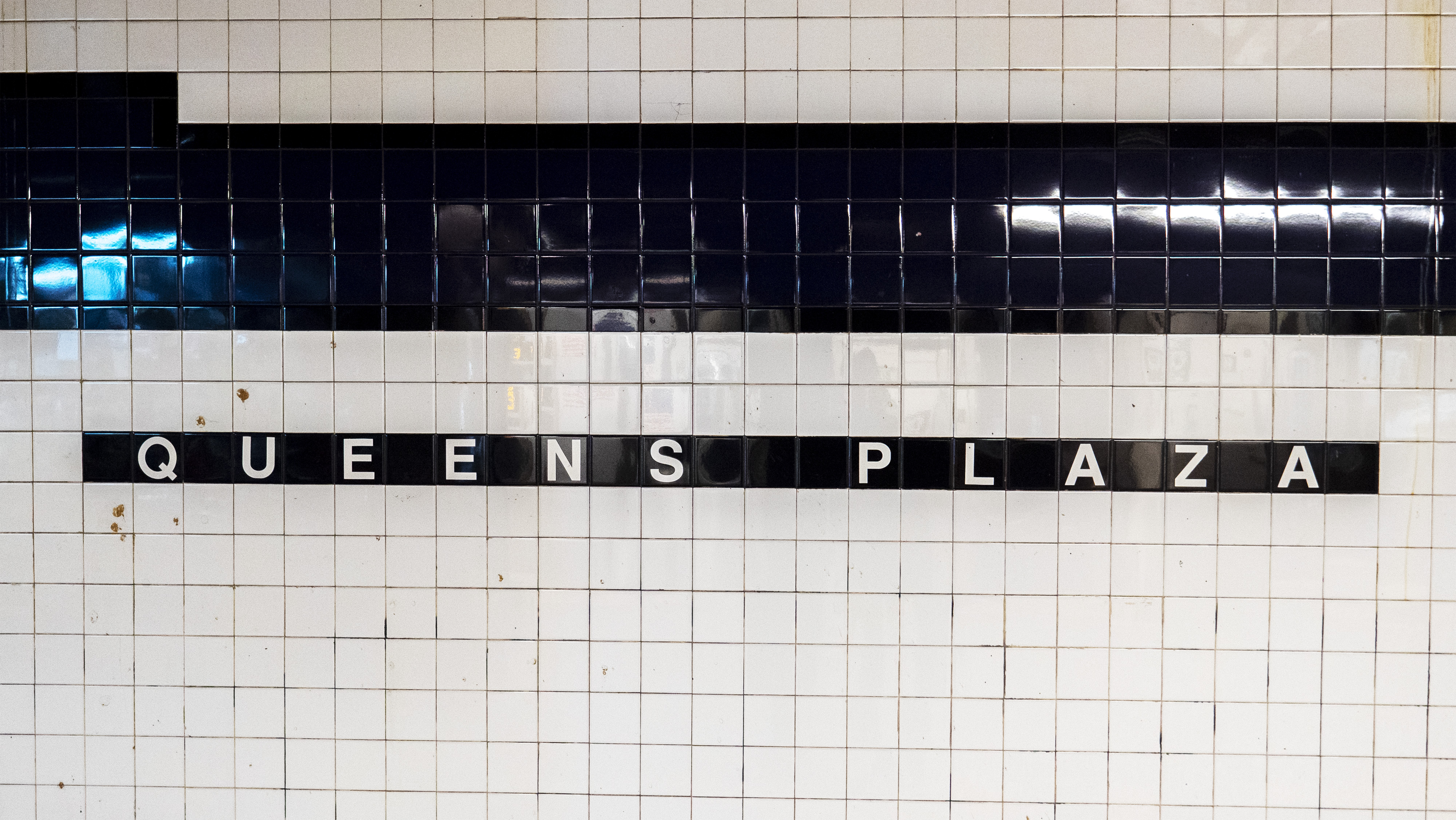
New tile caption and trim line

Like most express stations in the subway, Queens Plaza has two island platforms and four tracks, allowing cross-platform interchanges between local and express trains. The E train serves the station at all times, the R stops here except at night, and the F train serves the station on weekdays during the day. Limited <F> trains serve the station northbound during AM rush hours and southbound during PM rush hours. East of the station, the R always makes local stops. The E makes express stops during the day and local stops at night, while the F makes express stops when it serves this station. The next stop to the east (railroad north) is 36th Street for local trains and Jackson Heights–Roosevelt Avenue for express trains, while the next stop to the west (railroad south) is Court Square–23rd Street for E and F trains and Lexington Avenue/59th Street for R trains.

Its tile band is of the darkest shade of the violet family (Black Grape), three tiles high and black-bordered. Both trackside walls have a deep plum trim line with a black border and tile captions reading "QUEENS PLAZA" in white Helvetica on black. These replace the original, light-purple trim line and the tile captions in the original IND font. The tile band is part of a color-coded tile system used throughout the IND. The tile colors were designed to facilitate navigation for travelers going away from Lower Manhattan. As such, a different tile color is used at Jackson Heights–Roosevelt Avenue, the next express station to the east; the original purple tiles used at the Queens Plaza station were also used at all local stations between Queens Plaza and Roosevelt Avenue. Slate purple I-beam columns run along both platforms at regular intervals, alternating ones having the standard black station name plate with white lettering.

=== Track layout ===
West of the station, nighttime E trains cross to the express track from the local track. R trains stay on the local tracks, which split to the BMT Broadway Line via the 60th Street Tunnel to Manhattan and the IND Crosstown Line to Brooklyn. The connection to the Crosstown Line is not currently used in revenue service, having last been used in 2010 by the G train, while the 60th Street Tunnel Connection is used by R trains. The express tracks, used by E and F trains, continue to Court Square–23rd Street at Long Island City before they travel through the 53rd Street Tunnel to Manhattan.

East of the station, nighttime E trains cross from the express track to the local track; after which, the tunnel widens to include a lay-up track that forms from the two express tracks and then merges with the northbound express track. This storage track was formerly used to turn around G trains that terminated at Queens Plaza up to 1997; this track is now used to store R trains that get taken out of service at Queens Plaza during late evening hours. The tunnel then widens again to allow the IND 63rd Street Line ramps to rise and lead trains to merge with either the local or express tracks.

=== Exits ===
The full-time booth is near the center of the mezzanine. There are three staircases to the street on all corners of Queens Boulevard and Jackson Avenue except the northern one. There is an outside passageway to two more staircases near the southern and western corners of Jackson Avenue and Orchard Street at the south end near a former booth. The old-style change booth was in place until it was removed in 1998. Two of the outside entrances were redone to match the facade of the DOT indoor parking lot structure when it was constructed in 1975.

Before the renovation, the station had a full length mezzanine (inside and outside of fare control) with three booths. Since then, this area has balconies that allow views of local trains and platforms down below. There are three staircases to each platform from that end. Two staircases in between both fare control areas were removed during the renovation process. The space in between the two fare control areas was needed to build a signal relay room for the 63rd Street Connection. The part-time booth has two stairs to the northwest and southeast corners of Northern Boulevard at 41st Avenue, and one to each platform.

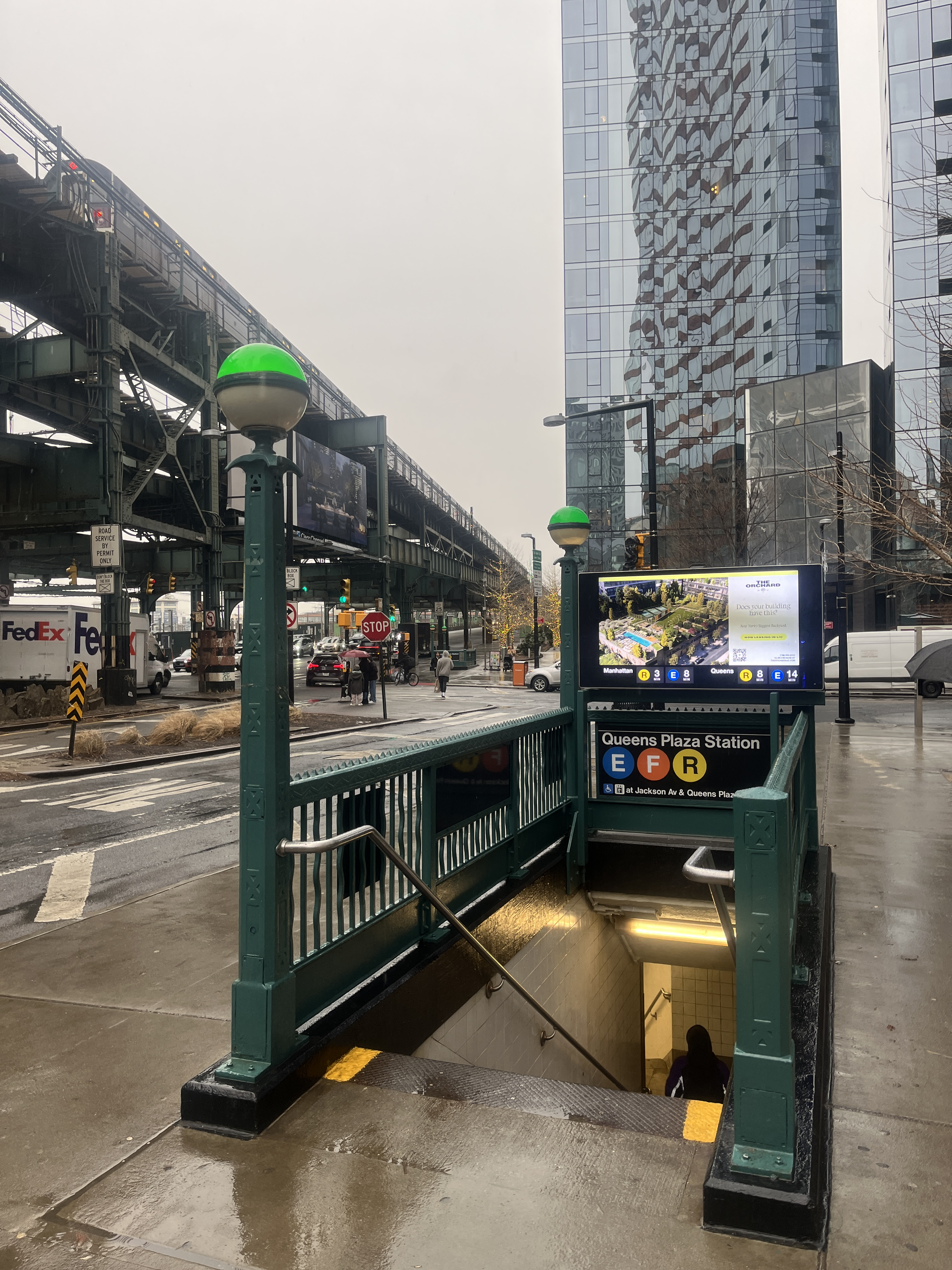
Stairway entrance, with IRT Flushing Line overhead

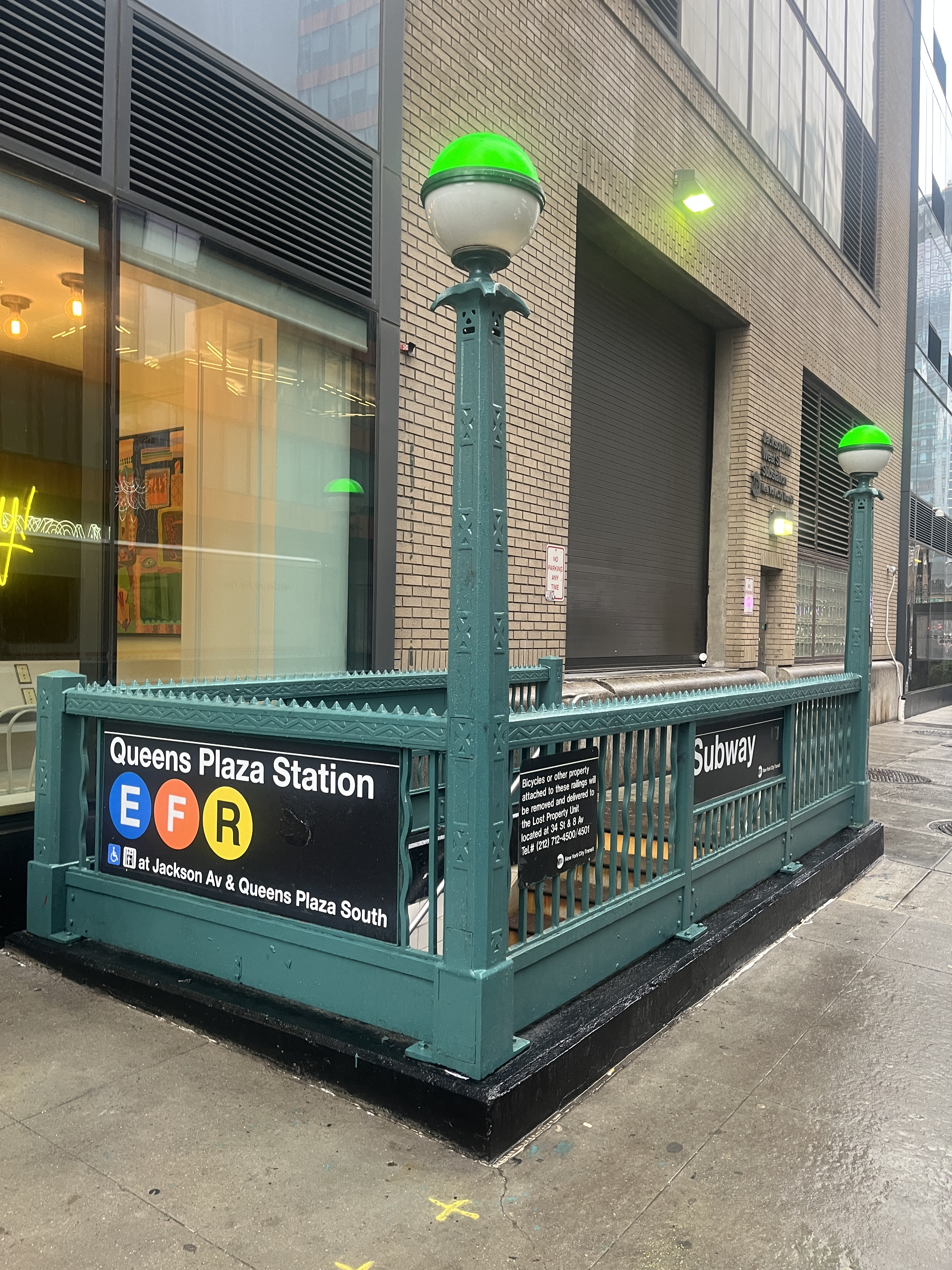
Stairway entrance, next to Jackson Ave West St Substation

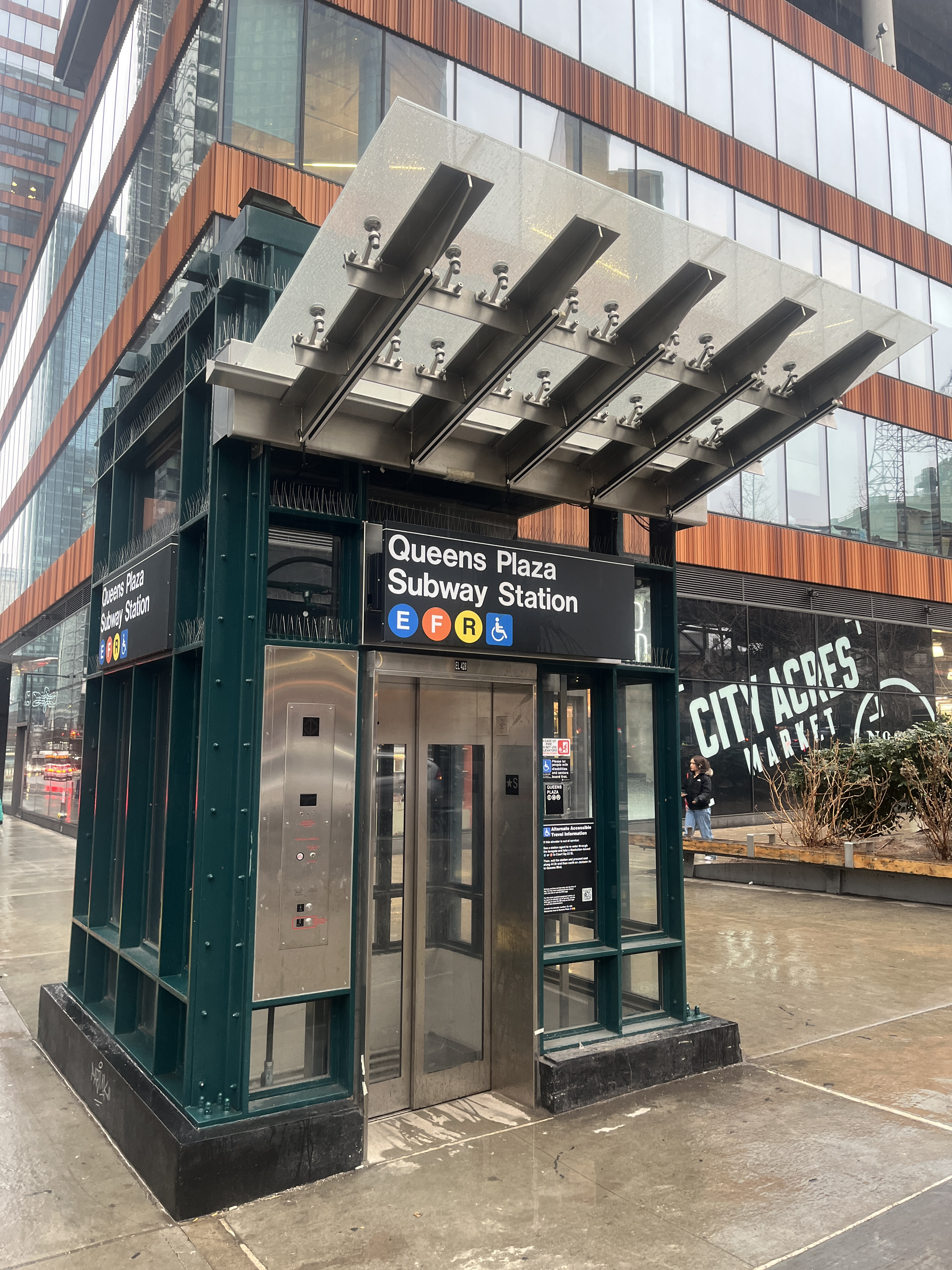
Elevator kiosk

== See also ==
- Dutch Kills Millstones
