= IND Queens Boulevard Line =

New York City Subway line

- Stations on the IND Queens Boulevard Line are served by E, F, <F>, M and R trains.

Overview
- Owner: City of New York
- Locale: Manhattan and Queens, New York City
- Termini: 50th Street; Jamaica–179th Street
- Stations: 25

Service
- Type: Rapid transit
- System: New York City Subway
- Operator: New York City Transit Authority
- Daily ridership: 256,518 (2022, weekday)

History
- Opened: August 19, 1933; 93 years ago
- Last extension: 1950

Technical
- Character: Underground
- Track gauge: 4 ft 8 1/2 in (1,435 mm) standard gauge
Route map
Express station	Local station	Closed station

The IND Queens Boulevard Line, sometimes abbreviated as QBL, is a line of the B Division of the New York City Subway in Manhattan and Queens, New York City. The line, which is underground throughout its entire route, contains 23 stations. The core section between 50th Street in Hell's Kitchen, Manhattan, and 169th Street in Jamaica, Queens, was built by the Independent Subway System (IND) in stages between 1933 and 1940, with the Jamaica–179th Street terminus opening in 1950. As of 2015, it is among the system's busiest lines, with a weekday ridership of over 460,000 people.

The Queens Boulevard Line's eastern terminus is the four-track 179th Street station. The line continues westward then northwest as a four-track line with the local tracks to the outside of the express tracks. The Queens Boulevard Line merges with the IND Archer Avenue Line east of Briarwood and with Jamaica Yard spurs west of Briarwood and east of Forest Hills–71st Avenue. The express tracks and the local tracks diverge at 65th Street in Jackson Heights and merge again at 36th Street in Sunnyside. West of 36th Street, the IND 63rd Street Line splits off both pairs of tracks, entering Manhattan via the 63rd Street Tunnel. At Queens Plaza in Long Island City, the line narrows to two tracks, with the local tracks splitting into the 60th Street Tunnel Connection and the IND Crosstown Line. From there, the express tracks of the line provide crosstown service across Manhattan under 53rd Street before turning southwest at Eighth Avenue, ending at the 50th Street station. The two-track section west of Queens Plaza is also known as the IND 53rd Street Line.

The Queens Boulevard Line is served by four routes: the E and F at all times, R all times except late night, and the M only on weekdays during the day. The routes experience frequent overcrowding during weekdays, and the Queens Boulevard Line has among the highest train frequencies during rush hours in the system. A planned upgrade to the line, to replace its signals with a communications-based train control system, would add capacity to the line. The E train serves the section between 50th Street and Briarwood, normally running express. The F train serves the entire line east of Fifth Avenue/53rd Street on weekdays, running express west of 71st Avenue and local east of there. The M and R serve local stops on the route west of 71st Avenue, with the M diverging from the line west of 36th Street and the R splitting west of Queens Plaza. During evenings and weekends, the E runs local between 71st Avenue and Briarwood, and F trains diverge west of 36th Street. E and F trains make all local stops west of 71st Avenue during late nights to provide local service along the line.

The line's construction in the 1920s and 1930s promoted housing growth along the Queens Boulevard corridor and stimulated the urbanization of central Queens. However, there are multiple provisions for spur routes along the Queens Boulevard line that were never built. The most notable of these proposals was the IND Second System, which would have provided a spur to Maspeth from the Jackson Heights–Roosevelt Avenue station; another spur to the Rockaways east of 63rd Drive–Rego Park via the Rockaway Beach Branch; a third spur east of Briarwood along the former Van Wyck Boulevard to South Ozone Park; and an extension of the line eastward past 179th Street. Other proposals included a "super express bypass" that would use the right-of-way of the Long Island Rail Road's Main Line to bypass all stations between 36th Street and 71st Avenue, as well as a spur from the Woodhaven Boulevard station northeast to Queens College via the Long Island Expressway.

== Route ==
The IND Queens Boulevard Line begins with a large storage yard consisting of two levels with four tracks each south of 185th Street and Hillside Avenue. Once the tracks from the lower level merge with the tracks on the upper level, there is the first station Jamaica–179th Street (E, F, and <F> trains), and the line continues as a four-track subway under Hillside Avenue. Just after curving north under the Van Wyck Expressway, a flying junction joins the two-track Archer Avenue Line (E train) to the local and express tracks. Soon after, the line turns west under Queens Boulevard.

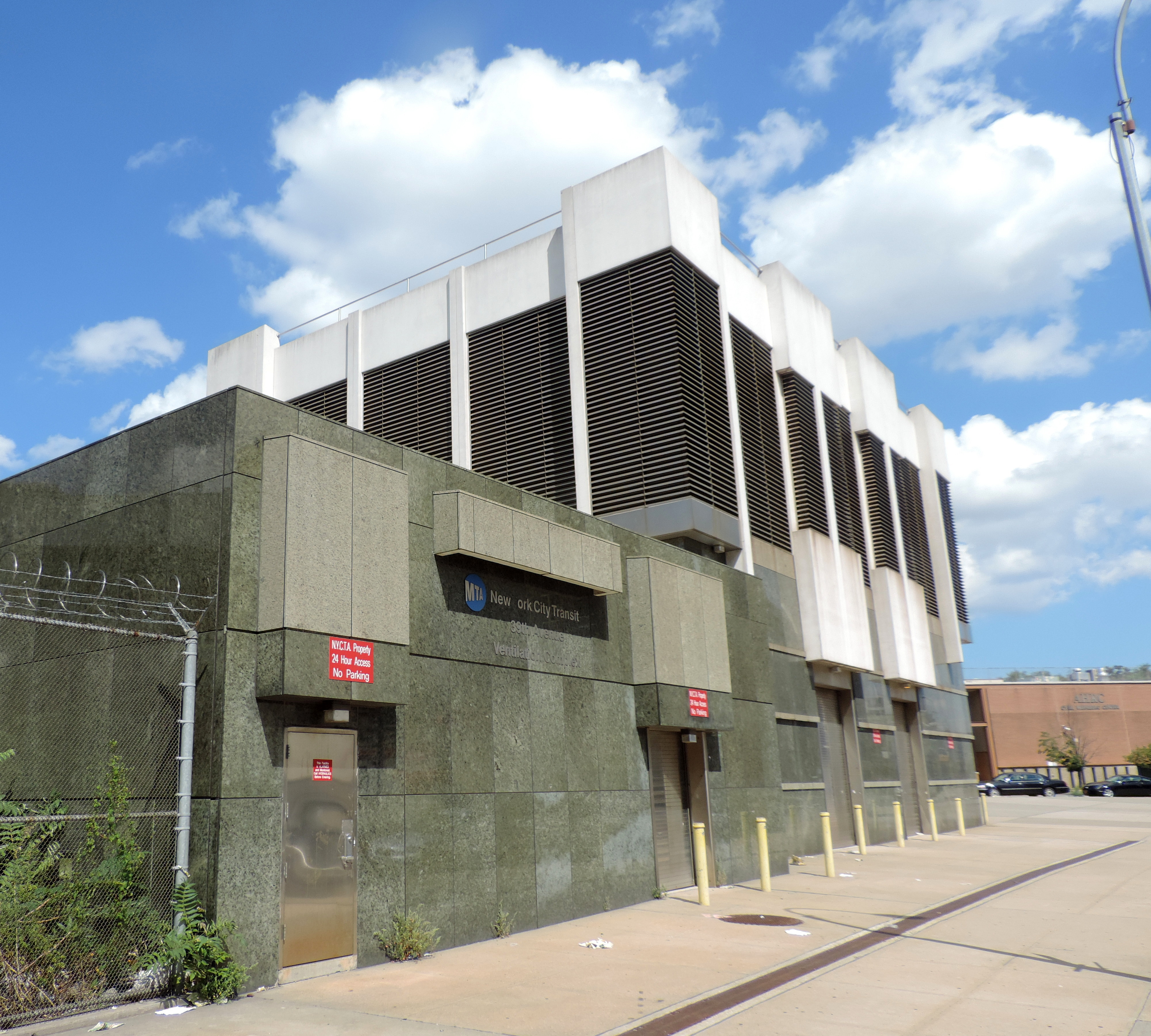
39th Avenue Ventilation Complex on Northern Boulevard

East of Kew Gardens–Union Turnpike, another flying junction ties the eastward tracks to Jamaica Yard. The other side of the wye curves west to become a lower level of the subway just west of Kew Gardens–Union Turnpike. After passing through 75th Avenue, those tracks join the local and express tracks at another flying junction.

At Forest Hills–71st Avenue, M and R trains begin their westward route. West of here, the line (now carrying the E, F, <F>, M, and R trains) runs under Queens Boulevard until it turns north onto Broadway after Grand Avenue–Newtown. Near Jackson Heights–Roosevelt Avenue, an abandoned trackless tunnel for the IND Second System branches off into an unused upper part of the station which is used for storage. At the intersection of Broadway and Northern Boulevard, west of the line's Northern Boulevard station, the express tracks turn west under Northern Boulevard. The local tracks take a longer route, remaining under Broadway, then turning south onto Steinway Street and west again onto Northern Boulevard, where they rejoin the express tracks. This is only one of two areas in the subway where the express tracks diverge from the local tracks (the other being the IND Culver Line between Seventh Avenue and Church Avenue.)

West of 36th Street, the F uses a different service pattern depending on the time of day, continuing along the 53rd Street Tunnel on weekdays during the day, and using the IND 63rd Street Line on nights and weekends. The two-track 63rd Street Line (F and M trains) splits from both sets of tracks at a flying junction, running to Manhattan under 41st Avenue. The Queens Boulevard Line continues under Northern Boulevard to Queens Plaza (E, F, <F>, and R trains) before splitting into three parts at another flying junction. The express tracks (E, F, and <F> trains) continue towards Manhattan under 44th Drive, while the local tracks split two ways, with the 60th Street Tunnel Connection (R train) turning northwest and the IND Crosstown Line (no regular service) remaining under Jackson Avenue (Northern Boulevard south of Queens Plaza). From this point on, the Queens Boulevard Line has only two tracks.

The line continues west through the 53rd Street Tunnel under the East River into Manhattan. After Lexington Avenue–53rd Street, the westbound track rises above the eastbound track. A flying junction after Fifth Avenue/53rd Street, ties the westbound track into the southbound local tracks of the IND Sixth Avenue Line, which begin here as a merge of these connection tracks and the IND 63rd Street Line. At that junction, the Sixth Avenue express tracks turn west under 53rd Street, just to the south of the Queens Boulevard Line. The two lines share platforms at Seventh Avenue, but no connecting tracks are present.

The Queens Boulevard Line then turns south below the IND Eighth Avenue Line with separate lower-level platforms at 50th Street. Afterward, the tracks split to join the local and express tracks of the Eighth Avenue Line north of 42nd Street–Port Authority Bus Terminal. At that station, a special lower platform formerly served a single southbound track from the Queens Boulevard Line, merging with both southbound tracks of the Eighth Avenue Line south of the station; the long-disused platform was demolished in June 2013 to make way for the extension of the IRT Flushing Line.

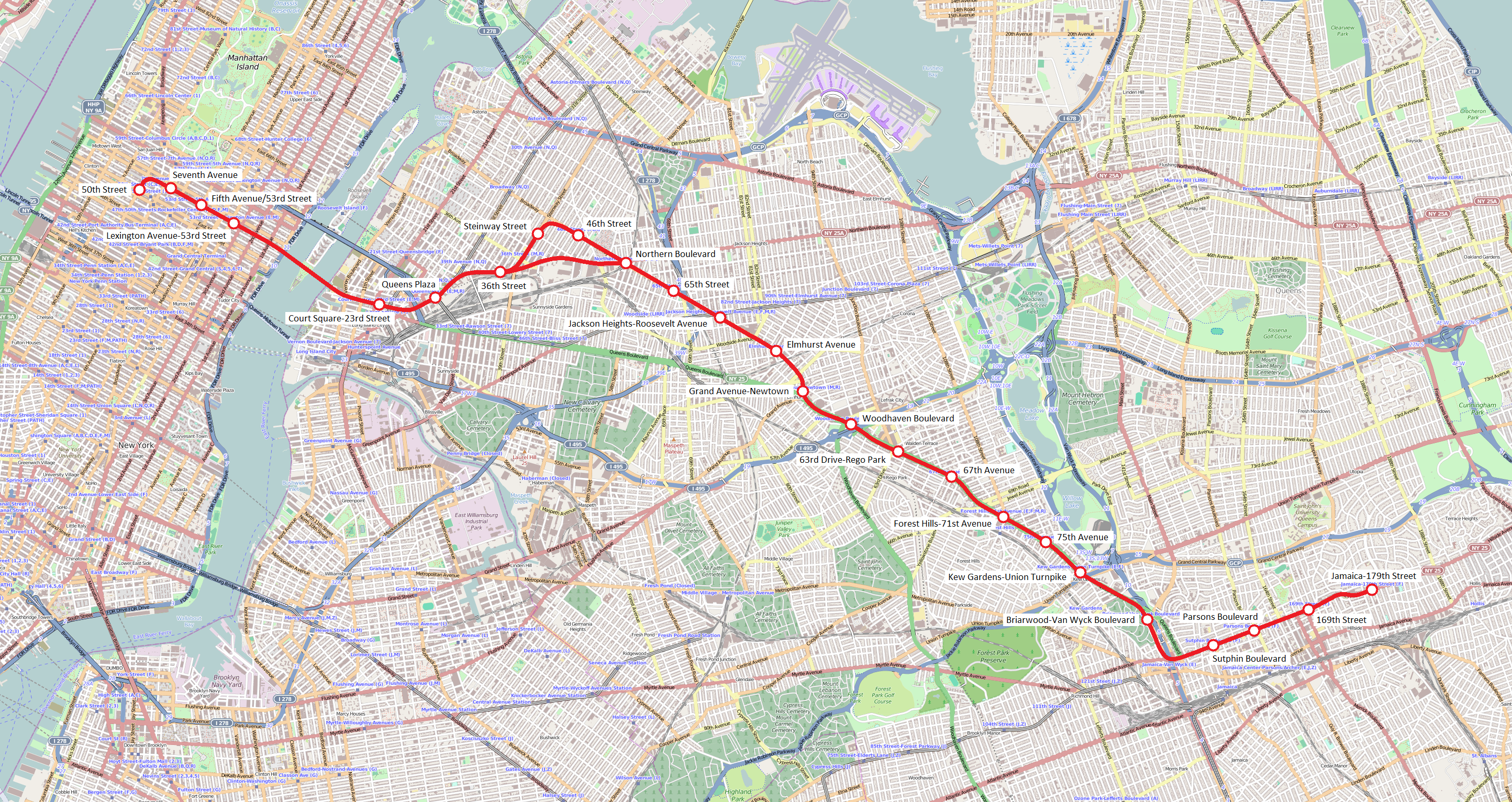
Overview of the IND Queens Boulevard Line

== Services ==
The following services use part or all of the IND Queens Boulevard Line:

	Time period					Section of line
	Rush hours	Middays	Evenings	Weekends	Late nights	Section of line
"E" train	express (entire line limited rush hour trips); express (south of Briarwood)	express (south of Briarwood)	express (south of Forest Hills–71st Avenue); local (between Forest Hills–71st Avenue and Briarwood)		local (south of Briarwood)	full line (limited rush hour trips) south of Briarwood (other times)
"F" train	express (south of Forest Hills–71st Avenue) local (north of Forest Hills–71st Avenue)				local	north of Fifth Avenue/53rd Street (weekdays except late nights) north of 36th Street (late nights and weekends)
"F" express train	express (south of Forest Hills–71st Avenue) local (north of Forest Hills–71st Avenue)	no service				north of Fifth Avenue/53rd Street (rush hour only)
"M" train	local (south of Forest Hills–71st Avenue)			no service		between 36th Street and Forest Hills–71st Avenue (weekdays)
"R" train	local (south of Forest Hills–71st Avenue)				no service	between Queens Plaza and Forest Hills–71st Avenue (all except late nights)

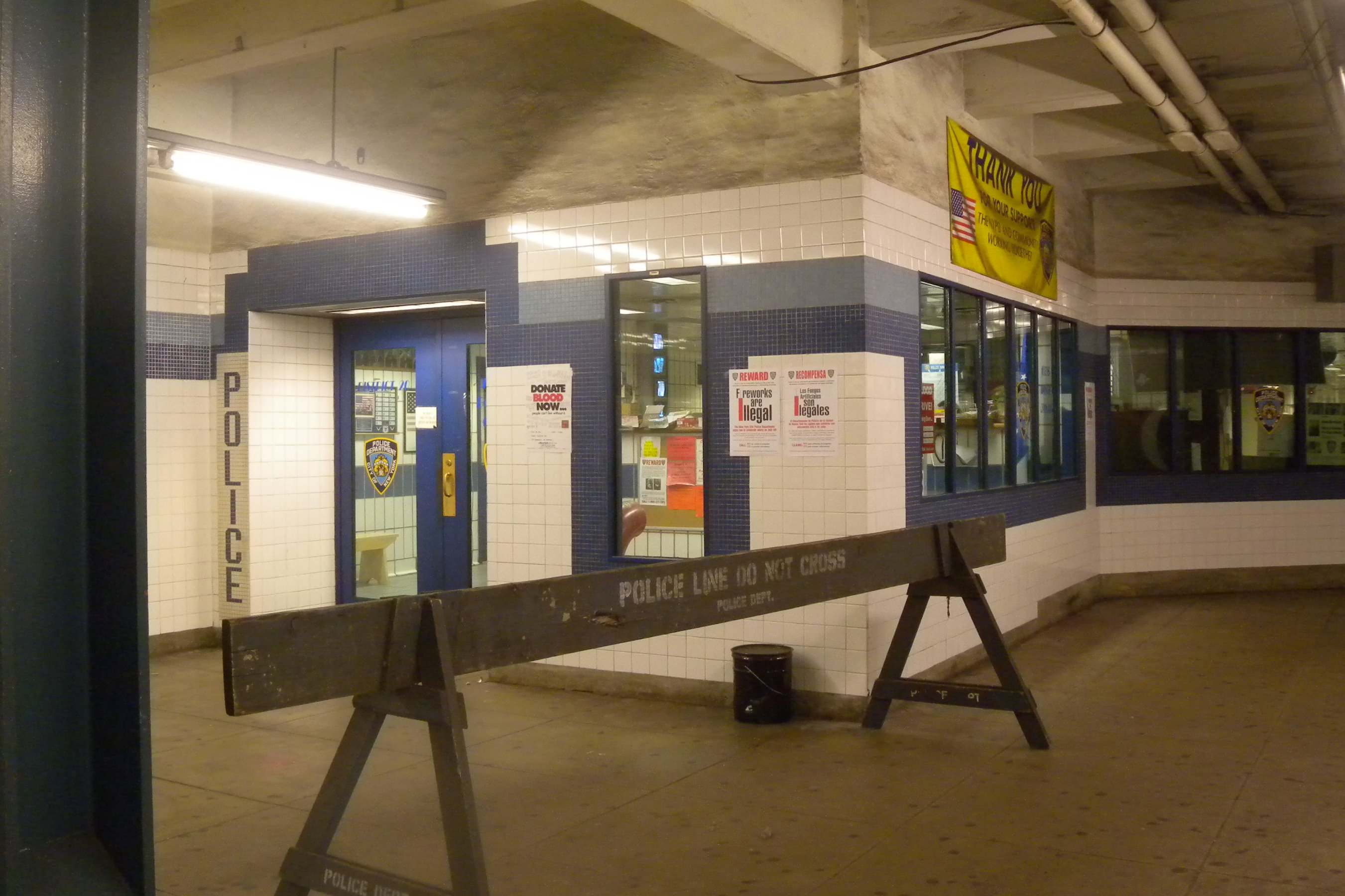
Briarwood station police headquarters

During daytime hours, the portion of the line between 36th Street and Forest Hills–71st Avenue is served by four services: the E, F, M, and R. The M operates via the Sixth Avenue and 63rd Street lines to Queens Plaza before making local stops to Forest Hills–71st Avenue on weekdays. The R enters Queens Boulevard from the Broadway Line and the 60th Street Tunnel before making local stops to Forest Hills–71st Avenue at all times except late nights. The F train joins the IND Queens Boulevard Line at Fifth Avenue/53rd Street on weekdays during the day, and it uses the 63rd Street Line further north during weekends and nights. During the daytime, the F runs express to Forest Hills–71st Avenue before making local stops to Jamaica–179th Street; the F makes all stops during late nights. The E train runs from the Eighth Avenue Line and 53rd Street to Queens Boulevard before making express stops along the line (except evenings and weekends when it makes all stops east of Forest Hills–71st Avenue and during late night hours when it runs local on the entire line) to the Archer Avenue Line east of Briarwood. Limited rush hour E trains also run express to Jamaica–179th Street.

The entire line is patrolled by NYPD Transit Bureau District 20, headquartered at Briarwood.

== History ==
=== Construction ===
The Queens Boulevard Line, also referred to as the Long Island City−Jamaica Line, Fifty-third Street−Jamaica Line, and Queens Boulevard−Jamaica Line prior to opening, was one of the original lines of the city-owned Independent Subway System (IND), planned to stretch between the IND Eighth Avenue Line in Manhattan and 178th Street and Hillside Avenue in Jamaica, Queens.

As originally proposed in 1925, the line's junction with the IND Crosstown Line in Long Island City would have been a T-junction, allowing trains from Manhattan to travel south to Brooklyn via the Crosstown line. A map from June of that year shows a proposed alternate routing for the Queens Boulevard Line, that would have had the line turn via Kew Gardens Road after the Union Turnpike station instead of continuing via Queens Boulevard. After proceeding via Kew Gardens Road, the line would have turned via Hillside Avenue. The proposed route via Kew Gardens Road was supported by Queens Borough President Maurice Connolly because it would have served Richmond Hill as well. He also pointed out that there was considerable opposition to building a subway line in front of Maple Grove Cemetery. The map shows a second line branching off and continuing along Queens Boulevard, then running under private property on a diagonal line to Sutphin Boulevard, where it would continue south until it reached the LIRR Jamaica station. Later plans eliminated the dual branches, and consolidated them along Queens Boulevard. This moved the initial alignment of the Sutphin Boulevard branch west to Van Wyck Boulevard (now Van Wyck Expressway), which was to extend as far south as Atlantic and 94th Avenues. This change caused a conflict between local business groups who wanted the subway under one or the other road. Ultimately, Chairman of the Board of Transportation John H. Delaney sided with the Van Wyck Boulevard alignment due to the fact that the Sutphin Boulevard alignment would have required buying more private property.

During construction, only bellmouths were built for the line, however, they were eventually used for the IND Archer Avenue Line. As documented by the map, the Queens Boulevard Line, as originally planned, would have had the express trains travel on a more direct route, via Broadway and Queens Boulevard, while the local trains would take a less direct route hitting larger population centers. There were to be two such instances, however, only one was actually completed. The first one, which was not constructed, would have gone through Winfield (now Woodside), west of the existing Elmhurst Avenue station, and the local tracks would have diverged, continuing via Queens Boulevard before turning onto 69th Street (Fisk Avenue), rejoining the express tracks at Broadway in Woodside. The second instance, the one that was built, was planned to have the local tracks continue via Broadway west of the 65th Street station, and then it would turn south via Steinway Street before rejoining the express tracks at the 36th Street station. The express tracks here would take the more direct route, via Northern Boulevard.

Originally, the New York City Board of Transportation (BOT) did not plan for a 50th Street station on the Queens Boulevard Line. This station was to have only been served by Eighth Avenue trains heading north toward Washington Heights. The Eighth Avenue Association petitioned the BOT for an additional stop at 50th Street. On November 21, 1926, it was announced that the BOT had agreed to construct a stop at this location for the Queens Boulevard Line.

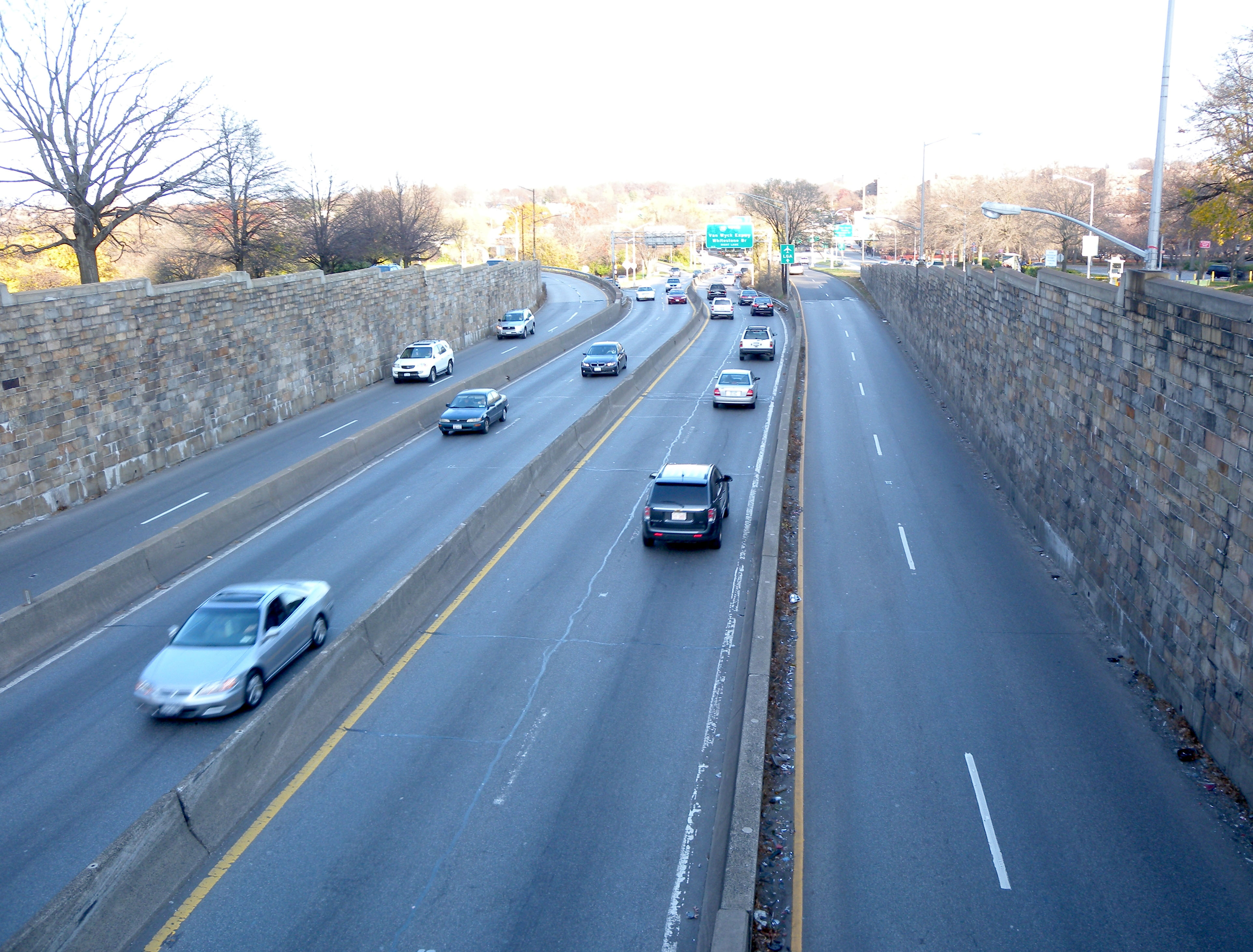
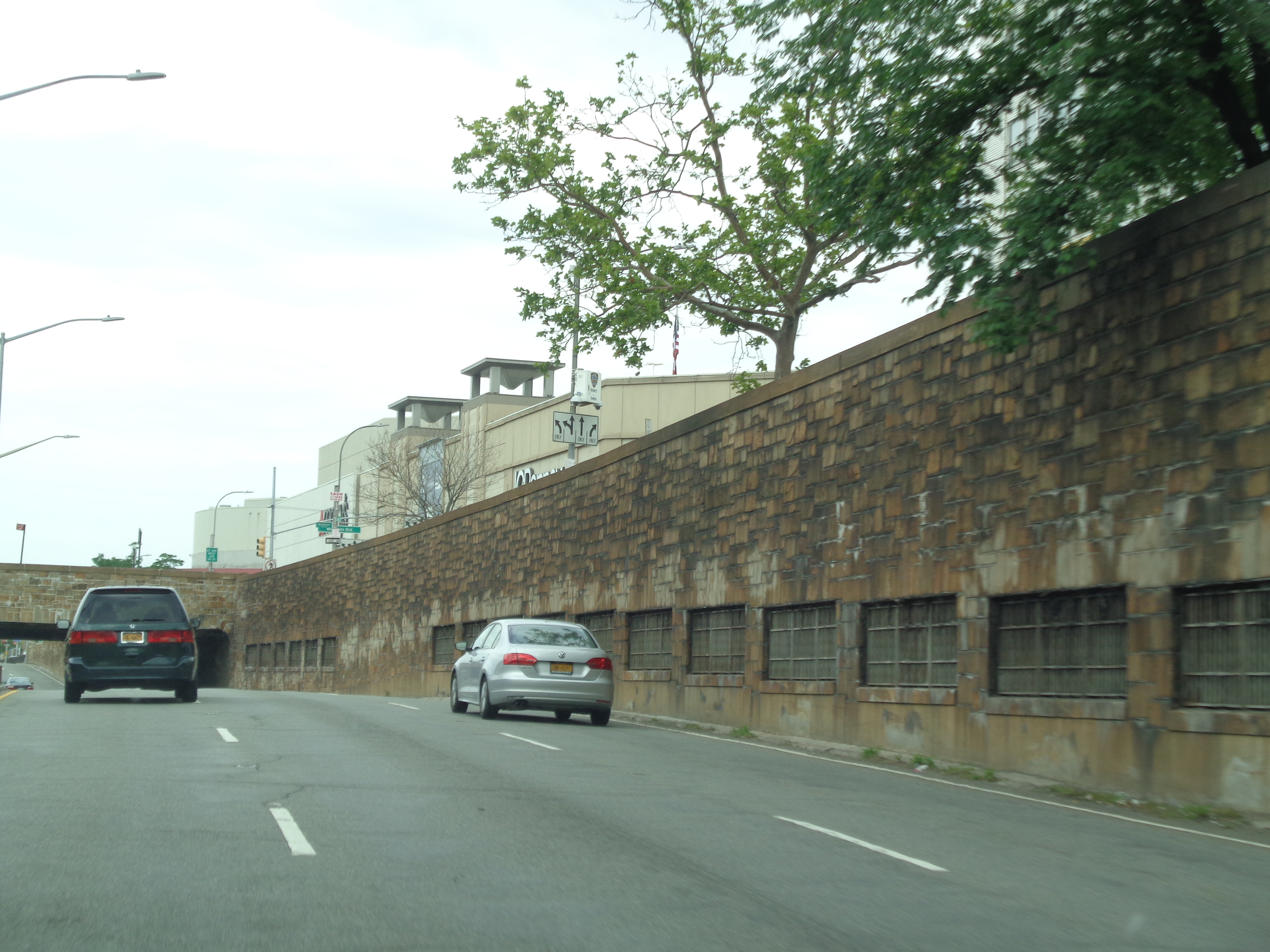
As part of the subway line's construction, underpasses were built at Kew Gardens (top) and Woodhaven Boulevard (bottom).

On February 26, 1927, the New York City Board of Estimate awarded and approved a $10,481,550 contract to the Patrick McGovern Company. Ground was broken at Vernon Boulevard and 44th Drive in Long Island City on April 2, 1927. The first contract for work entirely within Queens was given to the Atwell-Gustin-Morris Company by the BOT on December 14, 1927. The contract covered the section of the line under Jackson Avenue between the junction with the under-construction Crosstown Line near Queen Street and 44th Drive. The section between Arch Street and Steinway Avenue was awarded to the W.G.T. Construction Company, which required moving the support pillars for the elevated IRT Flushing Line to the sides of the street. Triest Construction Company was awarded the next segment, which was between Queen Street and the intersection of Northern Boulevard and 37th Street. The following section was awarded to J.F. Cogan Company, which was required to build the section between the intersection of Steinway Street and Broadway and the intersection of 53rd Street and Northern Boulevard. The remainder of the line was called Route 108, and it was divided into six sections. The first section, between 53rd Street and Pettit Place via Broadway went to Atwell-Gustin-Morris Company, while the section between along Broadway and Queens Boulevard from Pettit Place to 55th Avenue went to George H. Flynn Company. The sections from 55th Avenue to 64th Road and from 64th Road to 71st Road went to Arthur A. Johnson. The final two sections were from 71st Road to Union Turnpike, and from 137th Street (now the Van Wyck Expressway) to Hillside Avenue.

The two tubes of the 53rd Street Tunnel under the East River began construction in spring 1927, and were fully excavated between Queens and Manhattan in January 1929, with a ventilation shaft built on Welfare Island (today's Roosevelt Island). On October 4, 1928, the Board of Estimate approved the construction of the Queens Boulevard Line.

Construction on the line began in December 1928, and the whole line cost $58 million. During the line's construction, several intersections of Queens Boulevard with major roads were grade separated, in a similar manner to Grand Concourse in the Bronx during the building of the IND Concourse Line around that same time. At adjacent intersections with Woodhaven Boulevard and Horace Harding Boulevard (now the Long Island Expressway) in Elmhurst, Queens Boulevard's main road was depressed into underpasses. In Kew Gardens, Union Turnpike and the Interboro Parkway (now the Jackie Robinson Parkway) were depressed below Queens Boulevard at the level of the Union Turnpike station's mezzanine. From the mezzanine at Union Turnpike, an entrance was built from the Interboro Parkway, allowing passengers from buses and automobiles to be dropped off here instead of from Queens Boulevard. The subway from Long Island City to Roosevelt Avenue and 74th Street was completed by April 1932.

During the 1920s and 1930s, in conjunction with the subway construction project, Queens Boulevard was widened with up to twelve lanes in some places, and a right-of-way of 200 feet (61 m) in width was created. With the widening, Queens Boulevard was wide enough for the construction of a four track subway line without serious disruption of surface travel, with the area alongside the boulevard not built up in many places. More often than not in some places, billboards would be visible instead of buildings. During the construction of the line, electric utility service was temporarily provided by a wooden pole line. Once the construction of the line was completed, the utility service was underground, and the Queens Boulevard trolley line was replaced by bus service (today's Q60), in part due to competition with the newly constructed subway line. Because the construction of the Queens Boulevard Line utilized the cut-and-cover tunneling method, Queens Boulevard had to be torn up and in order to allow pedestrians to cross, temporary bridges were built over the trenches. Like other IND lines, many stations' mezzanines stretched the full length and width of their stations, and are now considered to be overbuilt.

On October 16, 1930, James A. Burke, the chairman of the Hillside Avenue Subway Extension Committee stated that the extension of the line to Springfield Boulevard was a certainty after receiving a letter from the Transportation Commissioner. On December 1, 1930, the BOT announced that a station would be constructed at 178th Street and Hillside Avenue, but would be done under the section between 178th Street and Springfield Boulevard, which was to be constructed simultaneously with the section from 137th Street to 178th Street. This announcement was made in response to a request by the Jamaica Estates Association for a station at 178th Street. At the time, BOT engineers were completing the design for the extension to Springfield Boulevard and the BOT said that bids on its construction might be let in the near future. On December 23, 1930, the contract for the construction of the section between 137th Street and 178th Street, Route 108, Section 11, was let.

On December 18, 1931, it was announced that the completion of the Queens Boulevard Line to Roosevelt Avenue was delayed until January 1, 1933. Previously, it has been announced that the line would open in 1931 or 1932. On January 18, 1933, Chairman of the Board of Transportation announced that work on the first section of the line would be completed by September. In addition, Delaney submitted the capital outlay program for the year, which called for the completion of the extension of the line to 177th Street and Hillside Avenue on January 1, 1935. The line was not completed by January 1 because the funding necessary for the final outstanding contract, which was for the installation of transformers and switch houses, was not registered until January by the Controller. In addition, one of the contractors, the L. I. Waldman Company, fell behind schedule. As a result, the company was fined and ordered to increase its labor force to complete the project on schedule. In March the September opening date was moved to August.

==== Building boom and the growth of communities ====
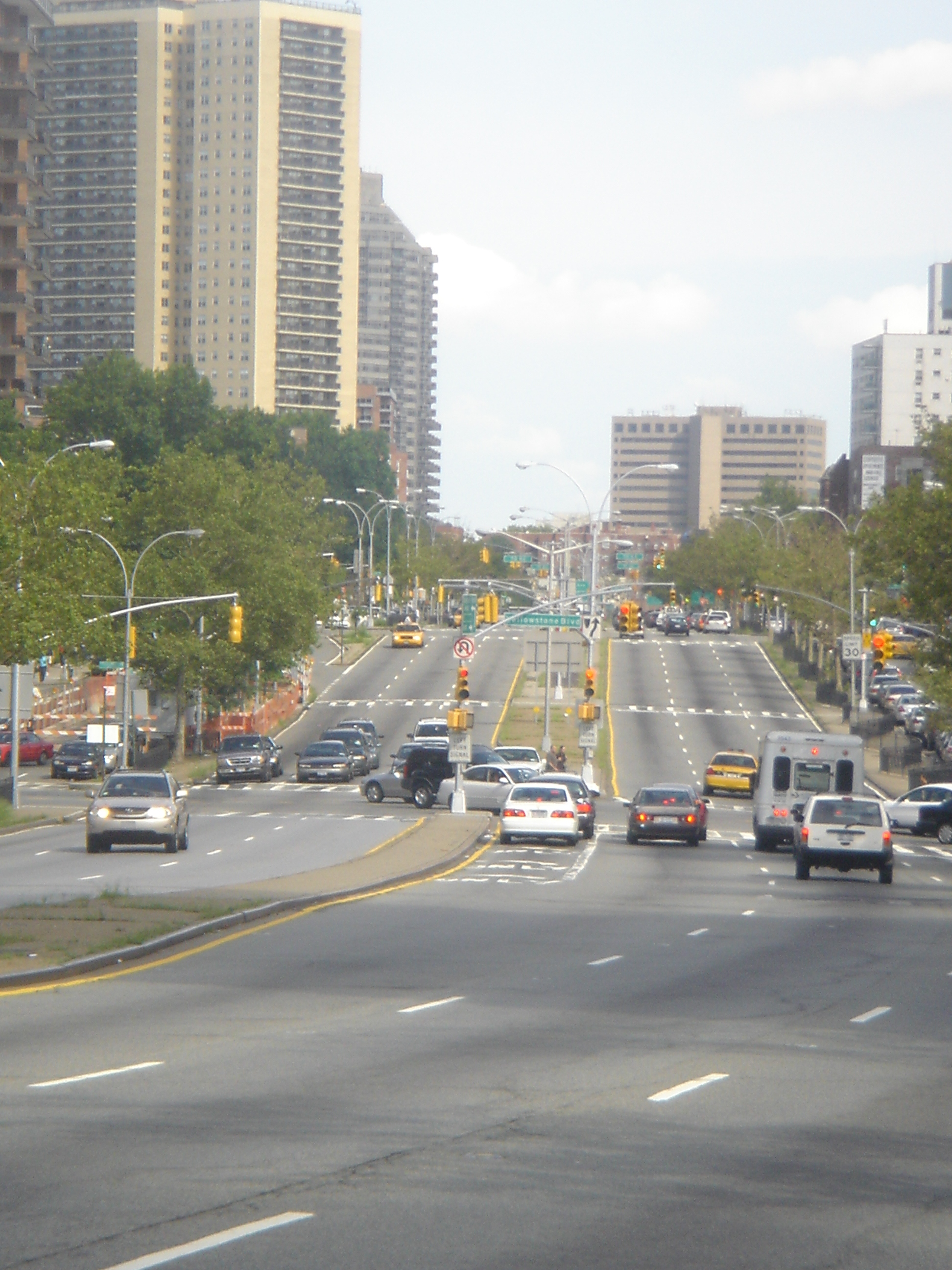
Neighborhoods in Queens, such as Forest Hills (pictured), sprung up around the new subway.

The construction of the Queens Boulevard subway line offered the possibility of quick commutes to the central business district in Midtown Manhattan. In the late 1920s, speculators, upon learning the route of the proposed line, quickly bought up property on and around Queens Boulevard, and real estate prices soared, and older buildings were demolished in order to make way for new development. In order to allow for the speculators to build fifteen-story apartment buildings, several blocks were rezoned. They built apartment buildings in order to accommodate the influx of residents from Midtown Manhattan that would desire a quick and cheap commute to their jobs. Since the new line had express tracks, communities built around express stations, such as in Forest Hills and Kew Gardens became more desirable to live. With the introduction of the subway into the community of Forest Hills, Queens Borough President George U. Harvey predicted that Queens Boulevard would become the "Park Avenue of Queens". With the introduction of the subway, Forest Hills and Kew Gardens were transformed from quiet residential communities of one-family houses to active population centers. Following the line's completion, there was an increase in the property values of buildings around Queens Boulevard. For example, a property along Queens Boulevard that would have sold for $1,200 in 1925, would have sold for $10,000 in 1930. The population of Forest Hills in 1930 was 18,000, having increased to 100,000 in 1965.

The construction boom was not limited to express stations, with fifteen-story apartment buildings built by Cord Meyer, an eighty-family apartment house built by the Rego Park Construction Corporation, and 300 one-family homes built along Woodhaven Boulevard by Pherbus Kaplan, all surrounding the 63rd Drive local station. These development companies all sought out to continue to increase the value of their properties in anticipation of the opening of the subway.

Queens Boulevard, prior to the construction of the subway, was just a route to allow people to get to Jamaica, running through farmlands. Since the construction of the line, the area of the thoroughfare that stretches from Rego Park to Kew Gardens has been home to apartment buildings, and a thriving business district that the Chamber of Commerce calls the "Golden Area".

In Elmhurst, almost all of the century-old buildings in the heart of the village were destroyed for the construction of the subway. Land was taken on the west side of the Broadway to avoid the demolition of the Saint James Episcopal Church and the Reformed Church. Many nineteenth century residences and the Wandowenock Fire Company buildings had to be torn down. To allow the subway line to curve into Queens Boulevard from Broadway, the northeast corner of the two streets was removed, in addition to some stores and an old Presbyterian chapel. New buildings were built behind a new curb line once the subway was completed, bringing a new face to Elmhurst. The introduction of the subway stimulated local growth in Elmhurst. Commercial buildings and apartment houses replaced existing structures.

From 1940 to 1950, in large part because of the construction of the Queens Boulevard Line, the population of Queens dramatically increased by 248,678, of which, 210,000 lived in areas alongside the new line and the buses that connected to it. By 1940, there were 27.5 square miles of vacant land alongside the line that could be used for housing, compared with only 8 in Brooklyn, 4 in the Bronx, and none in Manhattan.

=== Opening and expansion ===
The first section of the line, west from Roosevelt Avenue to 50th Street, opened on August 19, 1933 at 12:01 a.m. E trains ran local to Hudson Terminal (today's World Trade Center) in Manhattan, while the GG (predecessor to current G service) ran as a shuttle service between Queens Plaza and Nassau Avenue on the IND Crosstown Line. Initially trains ran on four to six-minute headways during rush hours. Later that year, a $23 million loan was approved to finance the remainder of the line, along with other IND lines.

In 1934 and 1935, construction of the extension to Jamaica was suspended for 15 months and was halted by strikes. Construction was further delayed due to a strike in 1935, instigated by electricians opposing wages paid by the General Railway Signal Company. On January 21, 1935, BOT Chairman John Delaney said that express service in Queens would not begin until construction on the proposed IND Sixth Avenue Line was completed. In February 1935, it was expected that work on Jamaica Yard would be completed by August 20. Construction was not begun until piles had been sunk, through mud and fill, into firm sand.

On March 17, 1936, at a hearing of the New York State Transit Commission and the New York State Public Service Commission, the LIRR said that it would seek permission in 1937 to abandon the three stations along its Main Line between Jamaica and Pennsylvania Station—Kew Gardens, Forest Hills, and Woodside. The LIRR had said that it anticipated a loss of annual revenue between $750,000 and $1 million with the opening of the extension of the Queens Boulevard Line to Jamaica.

The opening of the line to Continental Avenue was expected in October as of April 1936. At the same time, it was announced that Jamaica Yard would be placed into service with this extension of service. The installation of third rail and storage tracks were expected to be completed by the early summer.

In April 1936, William Jerome Daly, the secretary of the BOT, stated, in response to requests for a stop at 178th Street, that constructing a station at that location would prevent express service from operating past Continental Avenue. He said that with a final station at 169th Street, expresses could run to Parsons Boulevard, and that if the line was extended to Springfield Boulevard as planned, express service could be extended past 178th Street with a yard east of the new terminal.

In August 1936, construction to Forest Hills was expected to be completed by the end of the year. The tracks were installed all the way to 178th Street, and the stations to Union Turnpike were completed. However, the stops to the east still needed to be tiled, have stairways, turnstiles and lighting installed. Only two additional contracts remained to be put up for bid, both the results of last minute changes. The first of the two changes was for finishing the Ely Avenue station which did not open with the initial segment to Roosevelt Avenue. The second of the two entails the eastern terminal of the line. Initially, express trains were planned to terminate at a station at 178th Street. However, the plans were changed to terminate the express trains at Parsons Boulevard, requiring the installation of switches. Since construction of the tunnel was already completed in this section, a few hundred feet of tunnel wall had to be removed to fit the two switches. In addition, a new tunnel roof and new side supports had to be constructed. Since the line's new terminal would be at 169th Street, the tracks at 178th Street would be used to turn back trains. This change led to protests from the Jamaica Estates Association. This change delayed the opening of the line from Union Turnpike to 169th Street.

On November 19, 1936, Mayor Fiorello La Guardia announced that the line's extension to Union Turnpike would open on December 31, 1936. Accordingly, the line was extended east from Roosevelt Avenue to Union Turnpike on that date. The day before, a trial run was completed, with Mayor LaGuardia posing for a picture at the controls of the train. This extension cost $27 million, of which $5.8 million was for Jamaica Yard, $1.4 million was for real estate, $2.2 million, and $16.2 million for tunnels and tracks.

In March 1937, the extension to 169th Street was expected to be opened on May 1, requiring work to be finished by April 3 and fully approved and tested by April 20. As of this point, minor station work remained, including the installation of light bulbs, with the only major work left to be completed the final 200 feet (61 m) in the 169th Street terminal. Workers were working on installing the signaling for the two additional switches required. The Van Wyck Boulevard station was completed at the same time as the section of the line that opened to Union Turnpike on December 31, 1936. Work on the section east of Union Turnpike, including the eastern yard leads to Jamaica Yard, which was initially planned to be completed on October 20, 1936, was completed on March 31, 1937.

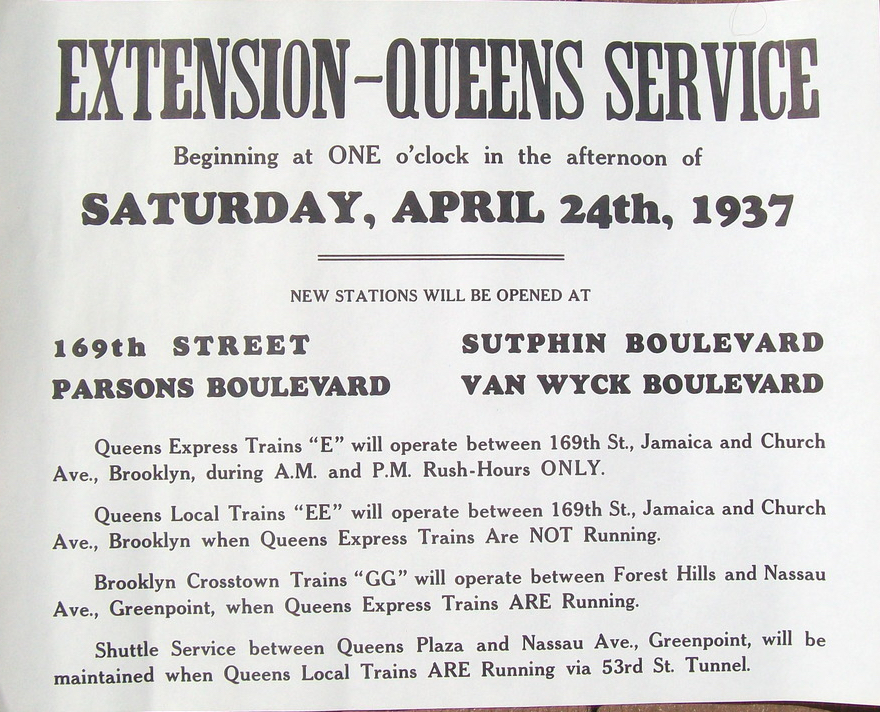
Poster announcing the extension of service to 169th Street and the inauguration of express service on April 24, 1937.

On April 9, 1937, Mayor La Guardia announced that the operation of the $14.4 million extension to Jamaica and express service would begin on April 24. The extension to Hillside Avenue and 178th Street, with a terminal station at 169th Street opened as planned on April 24, 1937. Express service was inaugurated during rush hours, with E trains making express stops from 71st–Continental Avenues to Queens Plaza. The express service operated between approximately 6:30 and 10:30 a.m. and from 3:00 p.m. to 7:00 p.m. Express service was also provided on Saturdays between 6:30 a.m. and 4:00 p.m.. During rush hours, GG trains were extended to Continental Avenue from Queens Plaza, taking over the local. During non-rush hours local service was provided by EE trains which operated between 169th Street and Church Avenue in Brooklyn. The sections of the line east of Roosevelt Avenue were built by the Public Works Administration.

This extension was celebrated with a ribbon-cutting ceremony at the Parsons Boulevard station and with a parade along Hillside Avenue. The initial headway for express service was between three and five minutes. 23rd Street–Ely Avenue station opened as an in-fill station on August 28, 1939. Upon its extension into Jamaica, the line drew Manhattan-bound passengers away from the nearby BMT Jamaica Line subway and the Long Island Rail Road.

From April 30, 1939 to October 1940, the Queens Boulevard Line served the 1939 New York World's Fair via the World's Fair Railroad. The World's Fair line ran via a connection through the Jamaica Yard and through Flushing Meadows–Corona Park along the current right-of-way of the Van Wyck Expressway. The 1939 World's Fair was served by GG trains, some of which were marked as S Special. Trains were extended to the World's Fair Station at all times during the fair, supplemented by PM hour E trains. The fair closed on October 28, 1940, and was demolished later that year. As a result, GG service was truncated to Forest Hills–71st Avenue. After calls from public officials such as Queens Borough President George Harvey to make the line a permanent connection to Flushing and northern Queens, the line was demolished in 1941.

After LaGuardia Airport opened on February 21, 1940, the Roosevelt Avenue station became an important transfer point to buses to the airport, including the privately owned Q33.

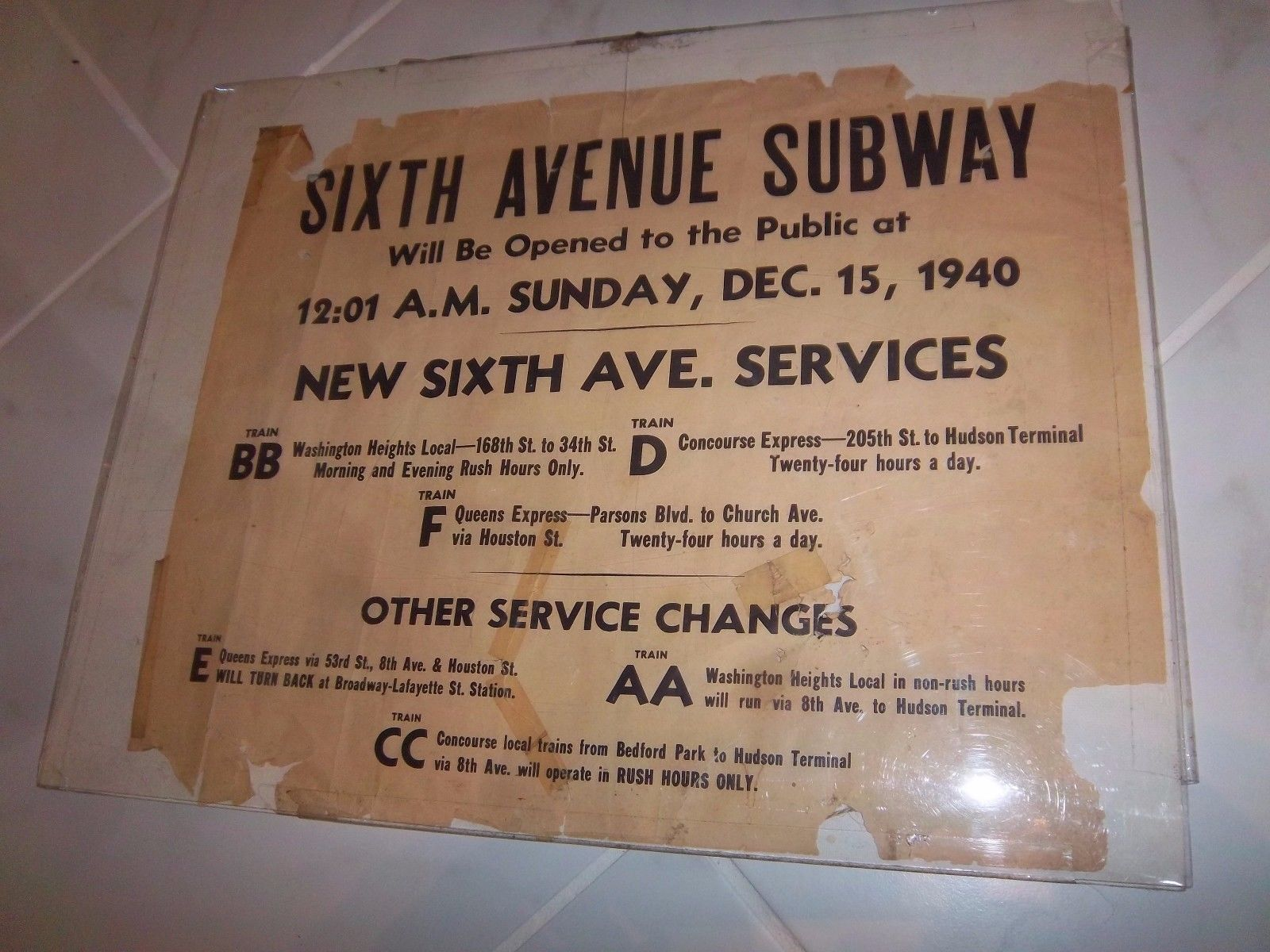
"Sixth Avenue Subway Will Be Opened to the Public at 12:01 A.M. Sunday, Dec 15, 1940"

On December 15, 1940, F trains began running via the newly opened IND Sixth Avenue Line, also running express west of 71st–Continental Avenues. 169th Street and Parsons Boulevard were both used as terminal stations during this time, with the E terminating at one station and the F at the other. This setup was instituted to prevent congestion at both stations.

==== New terminal ====
The existing 169th Street station provided an unsatisfactory terminal setup for a four track line, and this required the turning of F trains at Parsons Boulevard, and no storage facilities were provided at the station. The station was overcrowded as it served as a major transfer point for buses heading to areas throughout Eastern Queens. In February 1941, contractors started work on construction two additional staircases at the 169th Street station on each of the eastern corners at 168th Street and Hillside Avenue for $15,500. As a result, on January 30, 1941, Councilman James A. Burke proposed extending the line one stop to a temporary station at 178th Street to the Transit Commission at a conference on the issue of slow bus service.

Under his proposal, 169th Street station would continue to be used by riders on buses from Laurelton, Rosedale, Springfield, and from areas to the north of the station, while the 178th Street station would be patronized by riders from Hollis, Bellerose and Queens Village. Burke stated that the plan would cost $100,000 and would not require additional trackage or tunneling. In response to the proposal, BOT engineers analyzed the feasibility of such an extension. They determined that the line would have to be extended between 700 feet (210 m) to 1,000 feet (300 m) under Hillside Avenue to store and switch trains, that it would cost at least $2 million, which the city did not have, and would take between 2 and 3 years. Burke had also proposed two other alternative actions to the Transit Commission: the construction of a bus terminal at the northeast corner of Hillside Avenue and 168th Street, and the construction of a pedestrian tunnel between the 169th Street subway station at Merrick Road to the bus terminal on that street. The BOT engineers determined that it would cost $150,000. Burke had met with Mayor Fiorello LaGuardia and asked him to create a committee to study the matter. The Mayor refused and suggested that a station be built between 175th Street and 178th Street to be used for exiting only during the evening rush hour. The Transit Commission recommended Burke's proposed extension to the BOT, which they estimated would cost $150,000, and stated that a BOT drawing dated December 30, 1935, had indicated such a temporary station.

The construction of an extension was planned in 1940, and was ready to bid on in 1942 when it was delayed by World War II. Therefore, the line was going to be extended to 184th Place with a station at 179th Street with two island platforms, sufficient entrances and exits, and storage for four ten-car trains. The facilities would allow for the operation of express and local service to the station. On August 1, 1946, the Board of Estimate approved the plan for the extension of the line, which was estimated to cost $10.3 million, of which, $7,764,000 would go to construction, with the remainder for subway cars, power substations, third rail and signal equipment, and other electrical equipment. The project was expected to be completed within five years of the date that the contract was awarded.

On October 22, 1946, it was revealed that work on the extension might begin in early November as the BOT prepared to award the contract to Van Wagner Construction Company, which submitted a low bid of $5,284,888. The contract called for the extension's completion within two years. The extension was to be constructed using cut-and-cover and required the relocation of underground sewer and electrical lines.

Construction on the extension started in 1947 and was projected to be completed in 1949. The extension was completed later than expected and opened on December 11, 1950. E trains were extended there at all times and F trains were extended evenings, nights, and Sunday mornings.

On May 13, 1951, all trains outside of rush hour were extended to 179th Street using the local tracks beyond Parsons Boulevard. On October 8, 1951, trains were extended to 179th Street at all times. During rush hours, F trains skipped 169th Street running via the express tracks. At other times, the F stopped at 169th Street.

=== Late 20th century ===
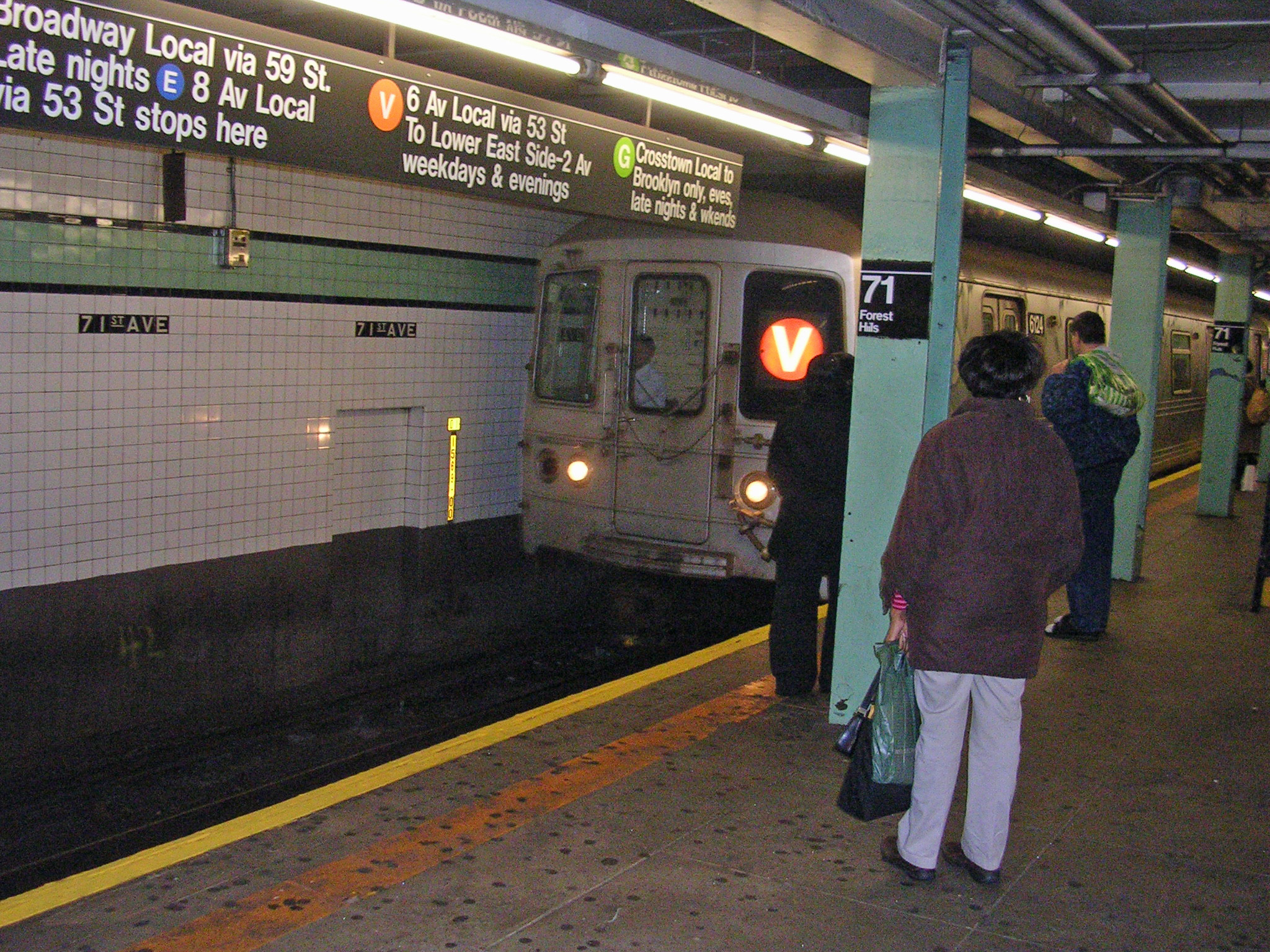
The V route was created in 2001 to add service as part of the connection with the 63rd Street Line, but was eliminated in 2010.

In 1953, the platforms were lengthened at 75th Avenue and Sutphin Boulevard to 660 feet (200 m) to allow E and F trains to run eleven car trains. The E and F began running eleven-car trains during rush hours on September 8, 1953. The extra train car increased the total carrying capacity by 4,000 passengers. The lengthening project cost $400,000. The operation of eleven-car trains ended in 1958 because of operational difficulties. The signal blocks, especially in Manhattan, were too short to accommodate the longer trains, and the motormen had a very small margin of error to properly platform the train. It was found that operating ten-car trains allowed for two additional trains per hour to be scheduled.

Because local service was only offered by the GG trains which only ran into Brooklyn, riders were forced to transfer at express stations to reach Manhattan. This caused overcrowding and delays. The BOT had first proposed a connection between the Queens Boulevard Line and the 60th Street Tunnel in 1940. Fifteen years later, on December 1, 1955, a connection to the 60th Street Tunnel opened, allowing trains from the BMT Broadway Line to serve Queens Boulevard as an additional local from 71st−Continental. This connection was one of the most important links in the system, correcting the 1930s error of insufficient capacity for Queens–Manhattan traffic. Service was initially provided by QT Broadway−Brighton trains (predecessor to the Q train). This service would be replaced by RR trains in 1961, a new EE train in 1967, and N trains in 1976.

By 1974 only two of 20 Queens stations on the line had greater ridership than in 1963. Total line ridership of 80.9 million, including Manhattan stations, was 15% below that of 1963. On August 27, 1977, GG service was cut back to Queens Plaza during late nights, and local service along Queens Boulevard was provided by the F. Effective May 6, 1985, use of double letters to indicate local service was discontinued, so the GG was relabeled G.

On April 20, 1981, Councilman Steven Orlow said the New York City Transit Authority agreed to put a contract to replace the lighting at six stations on the Queens Boulevard Line from 75th Avenue to 169th Street up for bidding in October, with work to be completed by early 1982. The existing lighting at the stations meant that platforms were very dimly lit, and made riders feel unsafe.

Until 1986, two E trains and two F trains started at Continental Avenue in the morning rush hour with the intention to relieve congestion. These trains were eliminated because they resulted in a loading imbalance as these lightly loaded trains would be followed by extremely crowded trains from 179th Street, which followed an 8-minute gap of E and F service from 179th Street.

On May 24, 1987, N and R services swapped terminals in Queens to provide R trains direct access to the Jamaica Yard. As part of the reroute plan, F service along Queens Boulevard was discontinued during late nights (1 a.m. to 5 a.m.). Late night local service was replaced by the R, which ran as a Queens Boulevard Local at all times. F trains were cut back to 57th Street on the Sixth Avenue Line during late nights. In addition, Queens Plaza became the northern terminal for the G train on evenings, weekends and late nights. In 1986, the TA studied which two services should serve the line during late nights as ridership at this time did not justify three services. A public hearing was held in December 1986, and it was determined that having the E and R run during late nights provided the best service.

==== Archer Avenue changes ====
Originally, the G and N local trains were planned to serve the upper level of the new Archer Avenue Line extension, while the E and F express trains would have remained on the Queens Boulevard mainline towards 179th Street. The N train was to have been extended from 71st Avenue to Jamaica Center during weekdays, and, when it terminated at 57th Street or 71st Avenue, during evenings and weekends, the G would have been extended to Jamaica Center, and during late nights, a G train shuttle would have run between Jamaica Center and Van Wyck Boulevard.

On December 11, 1988, the Archer Avenue Lines opened, utilizing existing provisions east of the Briarwood station. The E was rerouted to its current terminus at Jamaica Center. Its opening was expected to reroute 17,500 riders from Hillside Avenue to Archer Avenue. Two service plans were identified prior to the February 25, 1988 public hearing. The first would have split rush-hour E service between the two branches, with late night service to 179th Street provided by the R, while the second would have had all E trains run via Archer Avenue and would have extended R locals to 179th Street. A modified version of the second plan was decided upon. When the Archer Avenue Line opened, the E ran to Jamaica Center via the Queens Boulevard Line's express tracks. The R was extended to 179th Street to serve local stations east of Continental Avenue, replacing local E service to 179th Street, allowing F trains to continue running express to 179th Street. F trains no longer stopped at 169th Street between 10 a.m. and 3:30 p.m. During the morning rush hour, some R trains went into service at Continental Avenue, because local ridership from 179th Street during rush hours did not warrant it. All R trains went to 179th Street during the afternoon rush to avoid taking loaded R trains out of service at Continental.

The change in the plan was the operation of some E trains from 179th Street as expresses during the morning rush hour to provide an appropriate level of E service to Archer during the morning rush, to maintain the same level of service to 179th Street while providing express service, and to provide greater choice for riders at the Parsons Boulevard and 179th Street stations on Hillside Avenue. It was decided not to divert some E trains to 179th Street during the afternoon rush hour so that Queens-bound riders would not be confused about where their E train was headed.

It was decided to serve Archer with the E as opposed to the F to minimize disruption to passengers who continued to use Hillside Avenue, to maximize Jamaica Avenue ridership and the length of the peak ridership period, which is longer on the F. It was found that most riders using buses diverted to Archer used the E, while passengers on buses to 179th used the F. Having E trains run local between Continental Avenue and Van Wyck Boulevard was dismissed in order to provide 24-hour express service to the Archer Avenue Line.

Riders at local stations east of 71st Avenue (169th Street, Sutphin Boulevard, Van Wyck Boulevard and 75th Avenue stations) were angered at losing direct Queens Boulevard Express service in 1988. Local elected officials pressured the MTA to eliminate all-local service at these stations. On September 30, 1990 the R was cut back to 71st–Continental Avenue outside of rush hours. Late night service to 179th Street was replaced by G service, while F trains began running local east of 71st Avenue during middays, evenings, and weekends.

In response, the MTA considered three options including leaving service as is, having E trains run local east of 71st Avenue along with R service, and having F trains run local east of 71st Avenue replacing R service. Keeping service as is would have kept the reliability improvement that came with the relocation of the merge between E and F service from 75th Avenue to Van Wyck Boulevard, ensured maximum service capacity, and would have benefited the broad majority of riders on Queens Boulevard in terms of time savings and reliability. The second option would have decreased capacity by eight percent, or two trains per hour, increased travel times for most riders from Eastern Queens by 1–2 minutes, worsened reliability on the E and F, and introduced two merges-one with the R at Van Wyck Boulevard and one with the F at 75th Avenue. The third option was expected to help 13,880 people at former local stops with the introduction of direct express service, while lengthening trips by three minutes for 30,010 riders at Parsons Boulevard and 179th Street. In addition, it would decrease capacity by eight percent, or two trains per hour, reduce the reliability of E and F service, and possibly require more F service and less E service due to increases loads on the F. The third option was chosen to be tested in October or November 1992, and was expected to save the NYCTA $50,000 a year. It was also expected to slightly reduce ridership and revenue due to increased travel times for Eastern Queens riders.

On October 26, 1992, R trains were cut back to 71st Avenue at all times. In its place, the F ran local between 71st Avenue and 179th Street at all times, which eliminated express service along Hillside Avenue. This change was implemented for six months on an experimental basis at the request of passengers using the 169th Street, Sutphin Boulevard, Van Wyck Boulevard and 75th Avenue stations, which had lost direct Queens Boulevard Express service in 1988.

After the six months, the change was kept even though 77% of passengers had benefitted from the pre-October 1992 service plan because there was minimal negative passenger reaction and the intensity of the request. The change increased travel time along the F by 3.5 minutes, and reduced travel time for passengers at local stations by one to two minutes. In December 1993, the NYCTA agreed to extend the pilot change for six more months.

Between 1988 and 1990, following the opening of the Archer Avenue extension, ridership decreased by 12 percent at 179th Street, by 60 percent at 169th Street, by 47 percent at Parsons Boulevard, by 70 percent at Sutphin Boulevard, and by 28 percent at Van Wyck Boulevard.

==== 63rd Street changes ====
As part of the construction of the IND 63rd Street Line in the 1980s, it was proposed to reverse-signal the IND Queens Boulevard Line, to allow three of the line's four tracks to run in a single peak direction.

Beginning on March 23, 1997, due to construction on the connector between the IND 63rd Street Line and the IND Queens Boulevard Line, G trains terminated at Court Square on evenings, nights and weekends. On August 30, 1997, late night G service was permanently cut back from 179th Street to Court Square, being replaced with the F running local east of Queens Plaza, meaning that the G only ran along the Queens Boulevard Line on weekdays. On that date, E service began running local in Queens during late nights.

On December 16, 2001, the connection to the IND 63rd Street Line (built along with the Archer Avenue subway) opened and F trains were rerouted into it, away from the 53rd Street tunnel. The new peak-hour V train was created to replace the F via 53rd Street while running local on Queens Boulevard, requiring the truncation of the G to Court Square during weekdays. G service was extended to Forest Hills–71st Avenue at all other times, which represented the reverse of the previous pattern. The G was to be truncated to Court Square at all times to make room for the V, but due to rider opposition, it was cut back only on weekdays until 8:30 pm.

=== 21st century ===
Starting in August 2007 after a series of severe summer storms, the Metropolitan Transportation Authority (MTA) began installing decorative ventilation grates along the Hillside Avenue section of the line, and sealing other grates, both in order to combat flooding. At the time, the Hillside Avenue subway was considered the most flood-prone area in the subway system, due to its location at the bottom of the terminal moraine which runs across Long Island. Additional grates were later installed along Broadway and Steinway Street at the west end of the line.

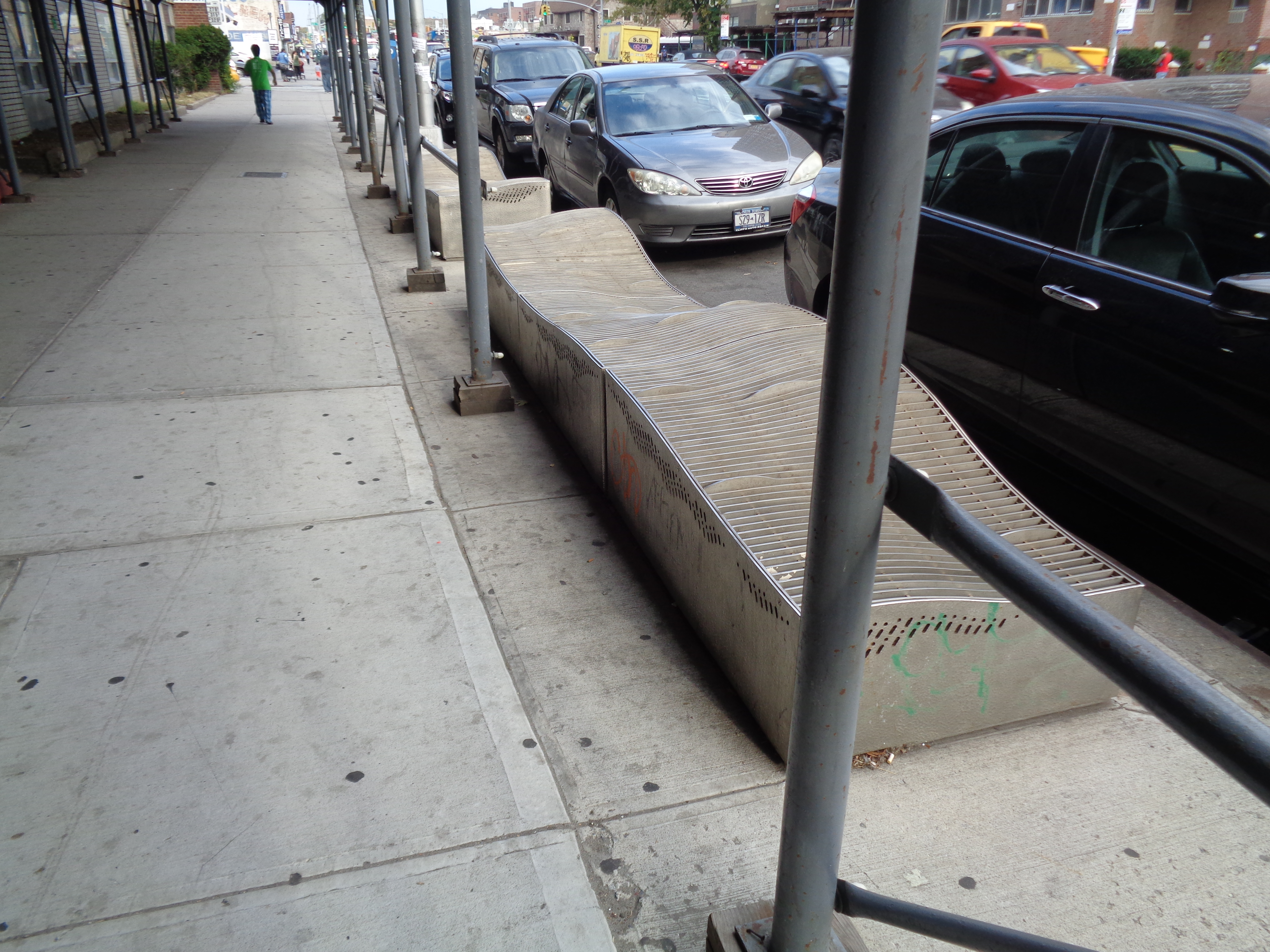
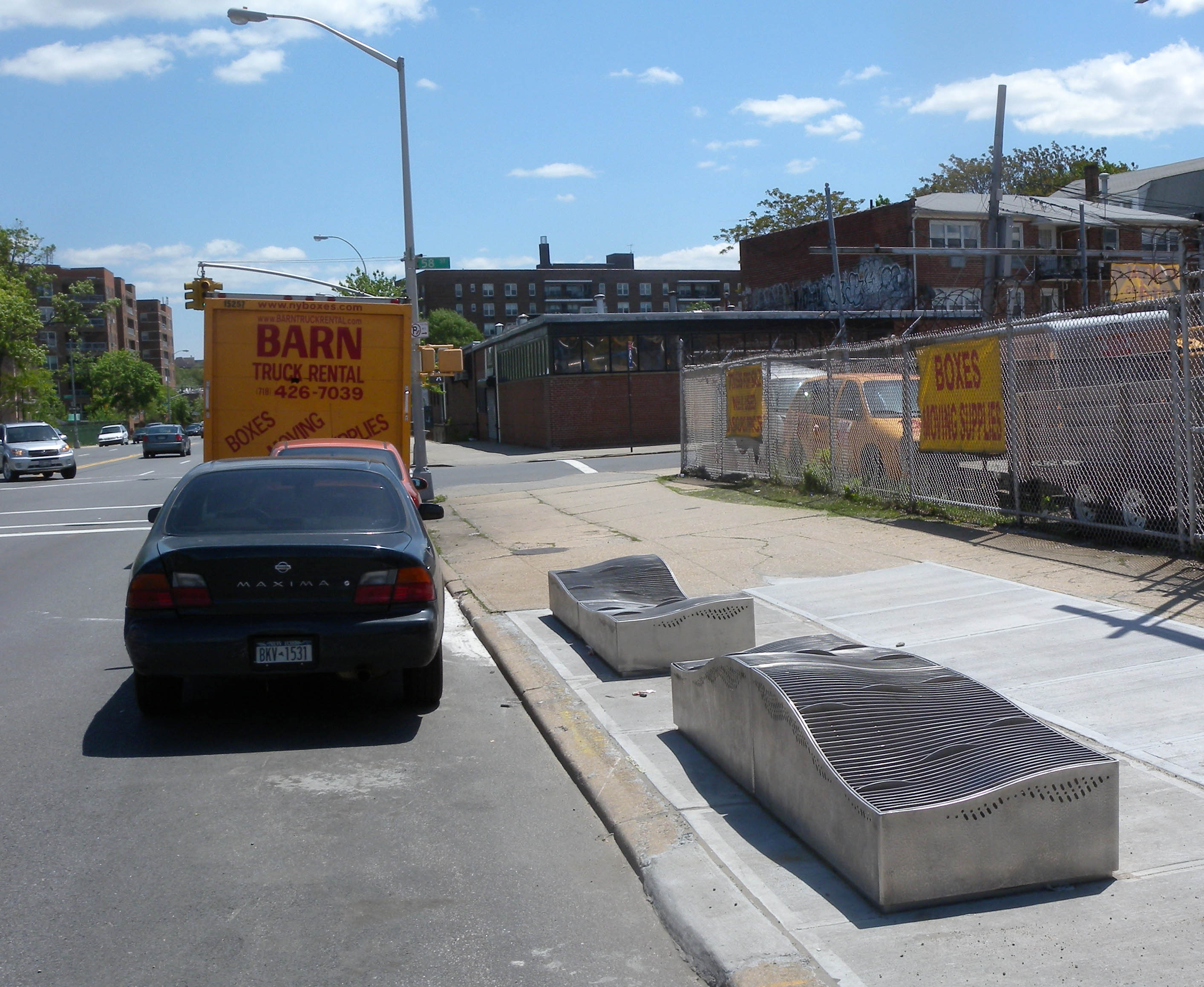
The decorative subway ventilation grates along Hillside Avenue (left) and Broadway (right), which mitigate flooding

In 2010, budget constraints within the MTA led to service reductions on the line. On April 19, 2010, G service was permanently truncated to Court Square at all hours; thus Crosstown Line trains, which originally were the sole trains to serve the Queens Boulevard local tracks, no longer ran on the line at all. On June 27, 2010, V service was eliminated, and the M train was extended via the Chrystie Street Connection to replace it.

The 2015–2019 MTA Capital Plan called for the Queens Boulevard Line's Northern Boulevard, 67th Avenue, and Parsons Boulevard stations, along with 30 others, to undergo a complete overhaul as part of the Enhanced Station Initiative. Updates would have included cellular service, Wi-Fi, USB charging stations, interactive service advisories and maps, improved signage, and improved station lighting. However, in April 2018, it was announced that cost overruns had forced the MTA to reduce the number of subway stations included in the program from 33 stations to 20. The stations to be renovated on the IND Queens Boulevard Line were among the 13 stations without funding, which will be pushed back to the 2020–2024 Capital Plan. As part of the 2020—2024 Capital Plan, the Woodhaven Boulevard, Court Square—23rd Street, Steinway Street, Seventh Avenue, Briarwood, Northern Boulevard, and Parsons Boulevard stations will receive elevators to make them compliant with the Americans with Disabilities Act of 1990.

In June 2025, internal MTA documents were leaked, indicating that a proposal to reroute M trains through the 63rd Street Tunnel and reroute F trains through the 53rd Street Tunnel would be presented for approval in fall 2025. If approved, the route swap would be implemented by December. The route swap is anticipated to reduce overcrowding at 63rd Street line stations, as well as reduce reliance on critical interlockings west of the 36th Street station in Queens. In September 2025, the MTA confirmed that the F and M trains would swap routings on weekdays starting on December 8, 2025, with the F running via 53rd Street and the M running via 63rd Street.

==== Communications-based train control ====
Congestion on the line during peak hours has existed for much of the line's history, and in 2015, the stations along the line had a combined 467,779 entries, making it among the system's busiest. As a result of overcrowding, the MTA is automating the line. Because the line hosts several services, installation of CBTC on the line is more complex than on the IRT Flushing Line and BMT Canarsie Line, which had also received CBTC and which each hosted only one service. The total cost for the entire Queens Boulevard Line is estimated at over $900 million. The automation of the Queens Boulevard Line means that the E, F, and <F> services will be able to run three more trains during peak hours, up from 30 tph, and the local tracks' capacity would also be increased.

Phase one equipped the tracks from 50th Street/8th Avenue and 47th–50th Streets–Rockefeller Center to Kew Gardens–Union Turnpike with communications-based train control. The $205.8 million contract for the installment of phase one was awarded in 2015 to Siemens and Thales. In January 2017, L.K. Comstock & Company Inc. was selected to fulfill a $223.3-million contract to upgrade existing signals and install communications, fiber-optic, and CBTC infrastructure for the new signal system. The project also included the conversion of 309 sets of R160 subway cars for CBTC compatibility, which as of April 2022 had been increased to 335 sets. The final section of phase one was activated in February 2022.

The 2015–2019 Capital Program was revised in April 2018 to fund to the design for the expedited installation of the Queens Boulevard Line east of Kew Gardens–Union Turnpike, the second phase. In December 2021, the MTA Board approved the first of three contracts to install CBTC on the eastern portion of the Queens Boulevard Line.

On March 17, 2023, New York City Transit made adjustments to evening and late night E, F and R service to accommodate long-term CBTC installation on the Queens Boulevard Line between Union Turnpike and 179th Street, which requires using the express tracks west of Forest Hills for overnight train storage. After 9:30 p.m., Queens-bound R trains terminate at Queens Plaza, and Queens-bound E and F trains make local stops in Queens to fill in for R service. Brooklyn-bound F trains run local in Queens after 10:45 p.m. The MTA did not specify how long these changes would last.

== Provisions for expansion ==
=== IND Second System ===
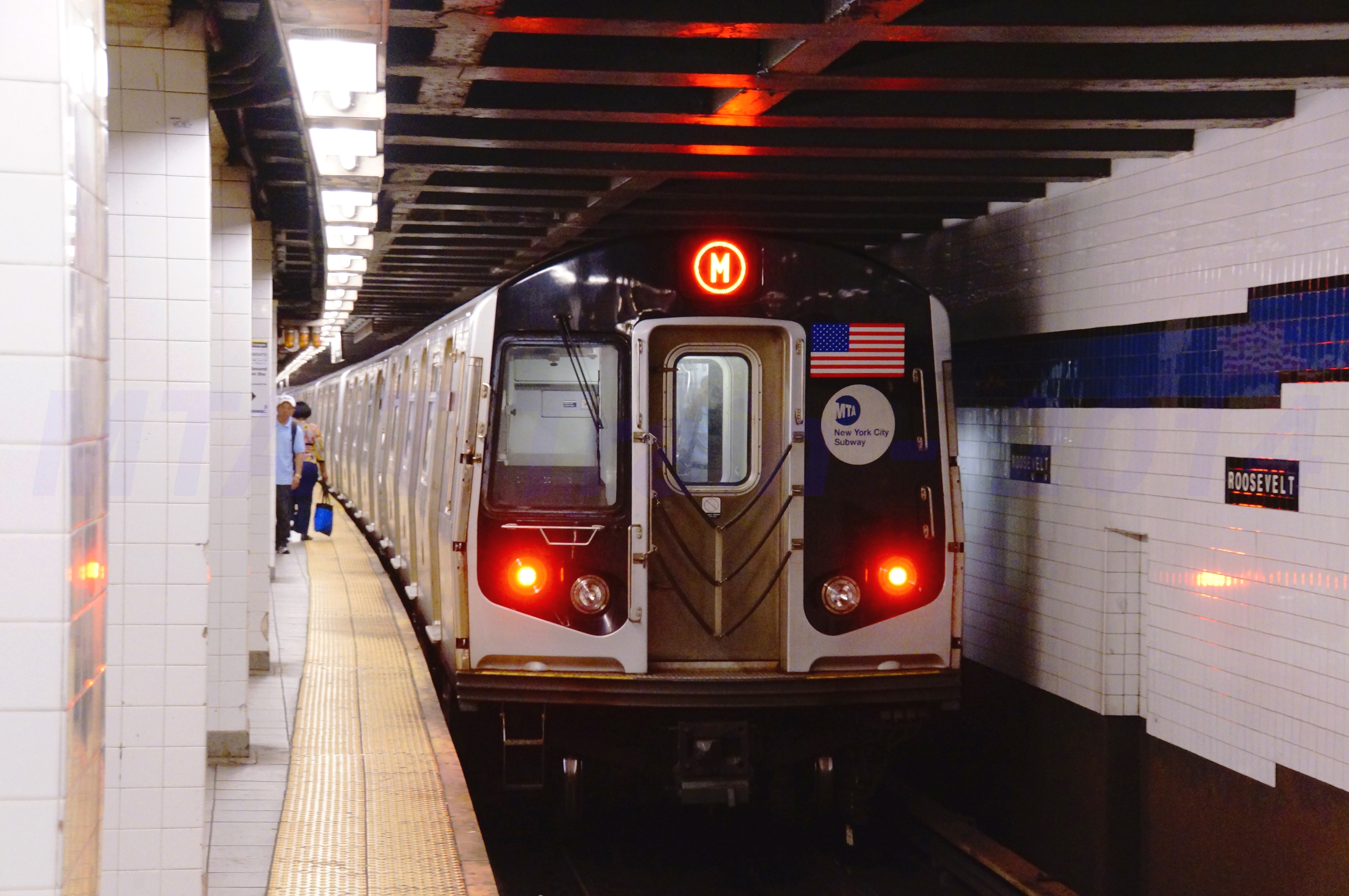
The Jackson Heights–Roosevelt Avenue station has an unused upper level.

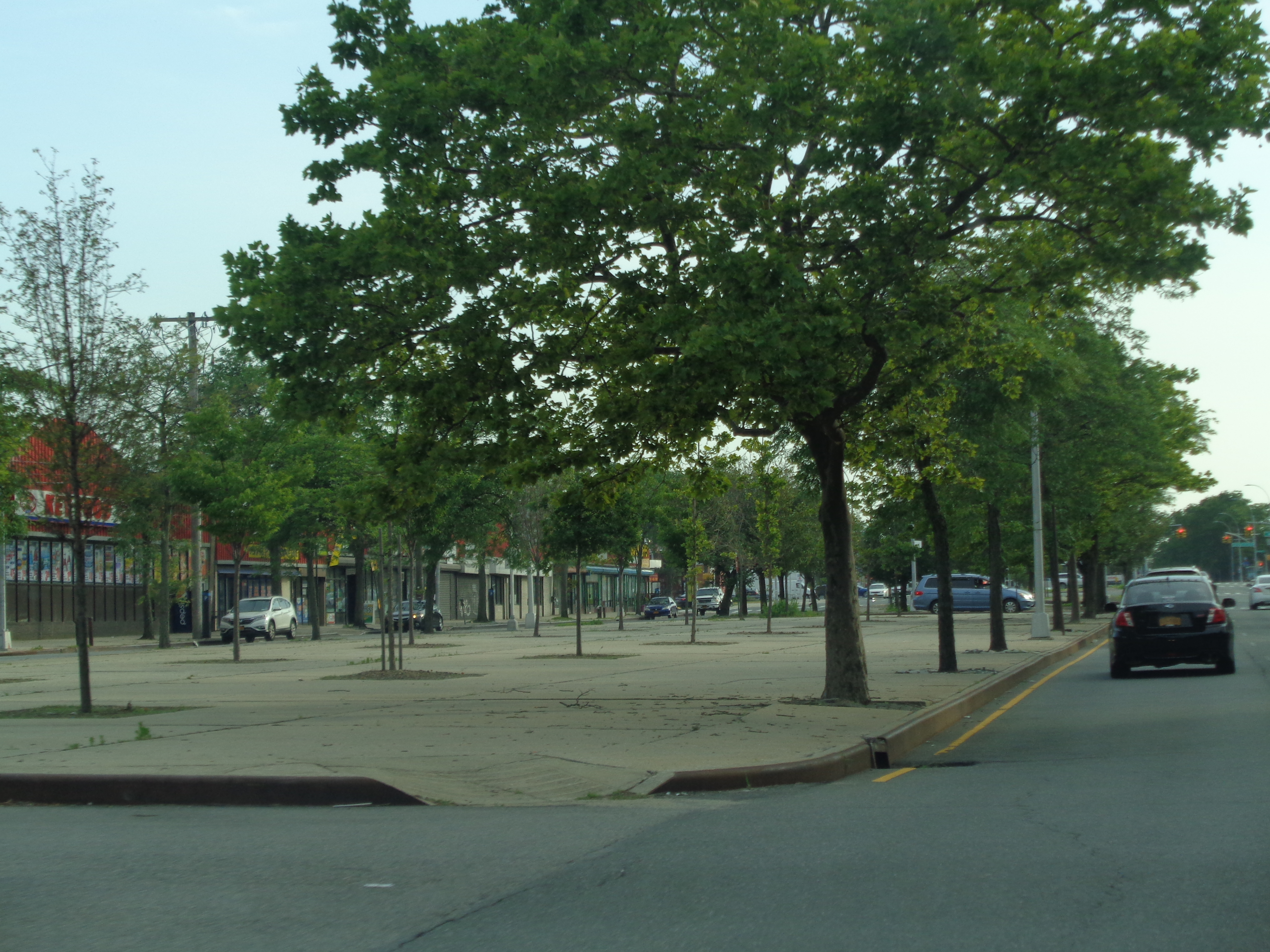
The wide median of Hillside Avenue, which would have facilitated the Springfield Boulevard terminal station.

The Queens Boulevard Line was originally planned to extend farther along Hillside Avenue into eastern Queens. The line would have gone at least to the intersection of Hillside, Springfield Boulevard and Braddock Avenue (the latter two both formerly part of Rocky Hill Road) in Queens Village, with later plans to go as far as Little Neck Parkway in Bellerose near the Nassau County border. The extension to Springfield Boulevard, which on contract drawings was referred to as Route 108-Section 13, would have been a two track extension of the D3 and D4 express tracks, with five stations, at 187th Street, 197th Street, Cross Island Boulevard (today's Francis Lewis Boulevard), 214th Street, and the terminal at Springfield Boulevard. All of these stations, with the exception of Springfield Boulevard, would have had two side platforms. Hillside Avenue was widened in the 1930s between 218th Street and 229th Street, in order to accommodate construction of the proposed Springfield Boulevard station and to accommodate an underpass for Hillside Avenue underneath Springfield Boulevard and Braddock Avenue. Six station entrances would have been provided at Springfield Boulevard and Braddock Avenue. The station would have stretched as far east as 88th Avenue. The two tracks would have continued to 229th Street. As part of the extension of the line to 179th Street in 1950, provisions were made to extend this line farther east via Hillside Avenue. East of the 179th Street there are two four track levels both used as train storage. The upper level was intended to be extended eastward, while the lower level was always intended to be used to relay and store trains. The tracks on the upper level are longer than the lower level tracks and the upper level tracks have a wooden partition at the bumper blocks. The tracks continue until 184th Street.

Several stations along the line also have provisions for other extensions as part of the IND Second System. The Roosevelt Avenue station has an additional upper level platform and bellmouth provisions east of the station, which would have gone to a Queens crosstown line to the Rockaways. The 63rd Drive station has similar bellmouths, which would have fed directly into the inactive portion of the Long Island Rail Road's former Rockaway Beach Branch near its former junction with the LIRR Main Line (Whitepot Junction). One stop west, the Woodhaven Boulevard station has provisions to be converted into an express station. East of the Briarwood station, there were additional trackways built for an extension down Van Wyck Boulevard (today the Van Wyck Expressway) to Rockaway Boulevard, near the current site of John F. Kennedy International Airport. None of these proposals were ever funded, and only the Briarwood bellmouths were used for future expansion, while the Rockaway line was connected instead to the IND Fulton Street Line.

=== Program for Action ===
When proposed in the mid-1960s under the MTA's Program for Action, the Archer Avenue and 63rd Street subway lines were two parts of a major planned expansion of Queens Boulevard line service. The 63rd Street tunnel would have facilitated service between the Queens Boulevard line and the Second Avenue Subway, via bellmouths west of Roosevelt Island which turn south towards Midtown and Lower Manhattan. These turnouts may be used for the third and fourth phases of the Second Avenue Subway. The proposed connection to the LIRR Rockaway Beach Branch resurfaced, with proposed branch lines along other LIRR lines to outer Queens areas without rapid transit service. Expected to be completed by the mid-1970s and early 1980s, these plans (the most important of which are outlined below) were derailed by the 1970s fiscal crisis, which delayed the completion of the Archer Avenue and 63rd Street lines.

==== "Super-express" line ====
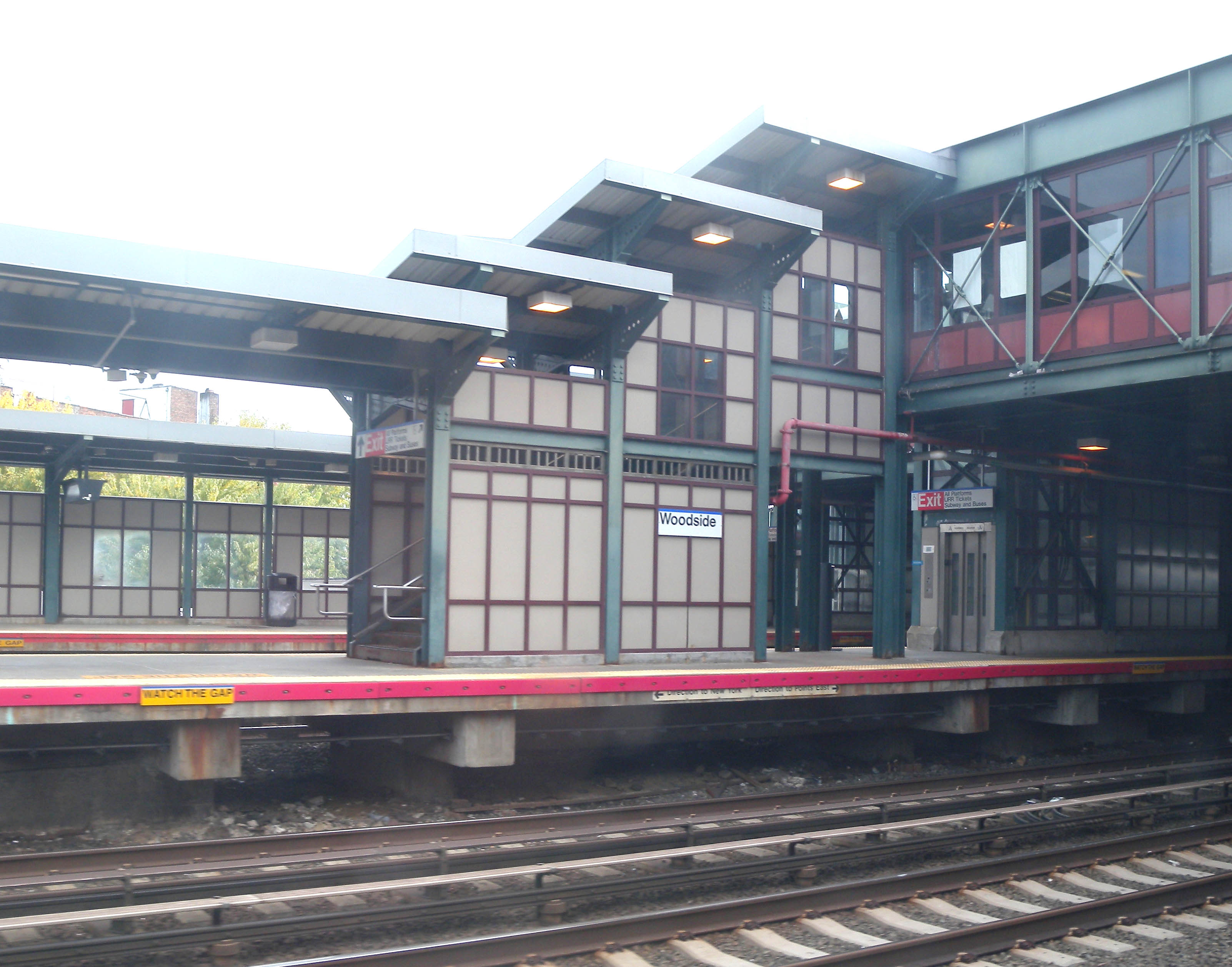
A "super-express" bypass of the line would have had a station built at Woodside.

The Archer Avenue and 63rd Street lines were planned to be connected by a "super-express" bypass of the Queens Boulevard line, The bypass would have used the outer two of the six trackways of the LIRR Main Line (formerly used by the Rockaway Beach Branch), which are currently unused, and would have allowed trains to travel at speeds of up to 70 miles per hour (110 km/h). It would stretch from the 63rd Street Line east of 21st Street–Queensbridge, with the possibility of access to the 60th and 53rd Street tunnels. At its east end, it would have left the LIRR right-of-way near Whitepot Junction and ran under Yellowstone Boulevard to the Queens Boulevard Line near 71st Avenue station. The 71st Avenue station would have been converted into a bi-level or tri-level station, with the super express tracks using the lower level(s) built south of the current station, before rejoining the main line Queens Boulevard tracks.

There were also plans for an intermediate stop at the current Woodside LIRR station, and an additional 63rd Street line station at Northern Boulevard adjacent to Queens Plaza. The bypass and proposed Woodside station would have necessitated the widening of the LIRR Main Line right-of-way onto private property west of Winfield Junction, where the Main Line merges with the Port Washington Branch, and reorganization of the track layout in the Sunnyside Yards. Later proposals suggested routing the bypass directly to the Archer Avenue line via the LIRR Montauk Branch (which no longer has passenger service).

While plans to construct the bypass existed as late as 1985, the connection to the Queens Boulevard line at Northern Boulevard was built as an alternative to the bypass. A bellmouth was built at the end of the tunnel should construction on the bypass ever commence.

==== Northeast Queens line ====
Another less publicized plan around this time was a branch line diverging from the Queens Boulevard mainline near Woodhaven Boulevard, and running along the Long Island Expressway (LIE) corridor to Kissena Boulevard at Queens College, and later to Fresh Meadows and Bayside. This "Northeastern Queens" line, or Route 131-C, would have been built in conjunction with the planned widening of the expressway. The subway tracks would have been placed under the expressway or its service roads, or in the median of a widened LIE in a similar manner to the Congress Branch of the Chicago "L". The Woodhaven Boulevard station, using existing provisions, would be converted to an express station. Three new stations would have been built during the first phase of the line, at 99th Street near LeFrak City, at Main Street, and a terminal station at Kissena Boulevard. At Main Street there would have been three tracks, and two island platforms. East of the terminus at Kissena Boulevard, there would have been two levels of layup tracks, allowing for an extension further east. A similar line along the corridor had been proposed in the 1939 IND Second System plan as an extension of the BMT Broadway Line east of the 60th Street Tunnel, when the road was called Horace Harding Boulevard prior to the construction of the expressway.

==== Southeast Queens line ====
The most important of the proposed lines along LIRR branches was a "Southeast Queens" extension of the Archer Avenue subway along the Locust Manor branch to Springfield Gardens, which was the original intention of the Queens Boulevard extension to Archer Avenue. This would have used an existing provision east of Jamaica Center, and necessitated the installation of two dedicated subway tracks, construction of new stations and/or the conversion of existing facilities along the right-of-way.

== Station listing ==
Station service legend
Stops all times	Stops 24 hours a day
Stops all times except late nights	Stops every day during daytime hours only
Stops late nights only	Stops every day during overnight hours only
Stops late nights and weekends	Stops everyday during overnight hours and weekends during daytime hours only
Stops weekdays during the day	Stops during weekday daytime hours only
Stops rush hours in the peak direction only	Stops during weekday rush hours in the peak direction only
Time period details
Disabled access	Station is compliant with the Americans with Disabilities Act
↑	Station is compliant with the Americans with Disabilities Act in the indicated direction only
↓	Station is compliant with the Americans with Disabilities Act in the indicated direction only
	Elevator access to mezzanine only

Neighborhood (approximate)	Disabled access	Station	Tracks	Services	Opened	Transfers and notes
Queens
Jamaica	Disabled access	Jamaica–179th Street	all	E F <F>	December 10, 1950	Q3 bus to JFK Airport
Jamaica		169th Street	local	F <F>	April 24, 1937	Q3 bus to JFK Airport
Jamaica		Parsons Boulevard	all	E F <F>	April 24, 1937	
Jamaica		Sutphin Boulevard	local	F <F>	April 24, 1937	Q44 Select Bus Service
Jamaica	IND Archer Avenue Line (E ) merges					
Briarwood	Elevator access to mezzanine only	Briarwood	local	E F <F>	April 24, 1937	Q44 Select Bus Service
connecting tracks to Jamaica Yard
Kew Gardens	Disabled access	Kew Gardens–Union Turnpike	all	E F <F>	December 31, 1936	Q10 and Q80 buses to JFK Airport
Forest Hills		75th Avenue	local	E F <F>	December 31, 1936	
Forest Hills	connecting tracks to Jamaica Yard; former connection to IND World's Fair Line					
Forest Hills	Disabled access	Forest Hills–71st Avenue	all	E F <F> M R	December 31, 1936	
Rego Park		67th Avenue	local	E F M R	December 31, 1936	
Rego Park		63rd Drive–Rego Park	local	E F M R	December 31, 1936	
Elmhurst		Woodhaven Boulevard	local	E F M R	December 31, 1936	Q52/Q53 Select Bus Service
Elmhurst		Grand Avenue–Newtown	local	E F M R	December 31, 1936	Q53 Select Bus Service
Elmhurst		Elmhurst Avenue	local	E F M R	December 31, 1936	Q53 Select Bus Service
Jackson Heights	Disabled access	Jackson Heights–Roosevelt Avenue	all	E F <F> M R	August 19, 1933	IRT Flushing Line (7 ) at 74th Street–Broadway; Q33 bus to LaGuardia Airport (Marine Air Terminal only); Q53 Select Bus Service; Q70 Select Bus Service to LaGuardia Airport
Woodside		65th Street	local	E F M R	August 19, 1933	
Woodside	express tracks go underneath (E F <F> )					
Woodside	Disabled access	Northern Boulevard	local	E F M R	August 19, 1933	
express tracks diverge (E F <F> )
Astoria		46th Street	local	E F M R	August 19, 1933	
Astoria		Steinway Street	local	E F M R	August 19, 1933	
express tracks rejoin (E F <F> )
Long Island City		36th Street	local	E F M R	August 19, 1933	
Long Island City	IND 63rd Street Line splits (F M )					
Long Island City	Disabled access	Queens Plaza	all	E F <F> R	August 19, 1933	
Long Island City	local tracks split to IND Crosstown Line (no regular service) and 60th Street Tunnel Connection (R )					
Long Island City	(Note: Southbound only)	Court Square–23rd Street	express	E F <F>	August 28, 1939	IND Crosstown Line (G ) IRT Flushing Line (7 <7>)
Manhattan
53rd Street Tunnel
Midtown Manhattan	Disabled access	Lexington Avenue–53rd Street	express	E F <F>	August 19, 1933	IRT Lexington Avenue Line (4 6 <6> ) at 51st Street
Midtown Manhattan		Fifth Avenue/53rd Street	express	E F <F>	August 19, 1933	
Midtown Manhattan	connection to IND Sixth Avenue Line (F <F>) splits					
Midtown Manhattan		Seventh Avenue	express	E	August 19, 1933	IND Sixth Avenue Line (B D )
Midtown Manhattan	Disabled access	50th Street	express	E	August 19, 1933	IND Eighth Avenue Line (A C ) (transfer in same direction only)
Midtown Manhattan	merges with IND Eighth Avenue Line (A C )					
