= Roosevelt Island station =

New York City Subway station in Manhattan

Roosevelt Island
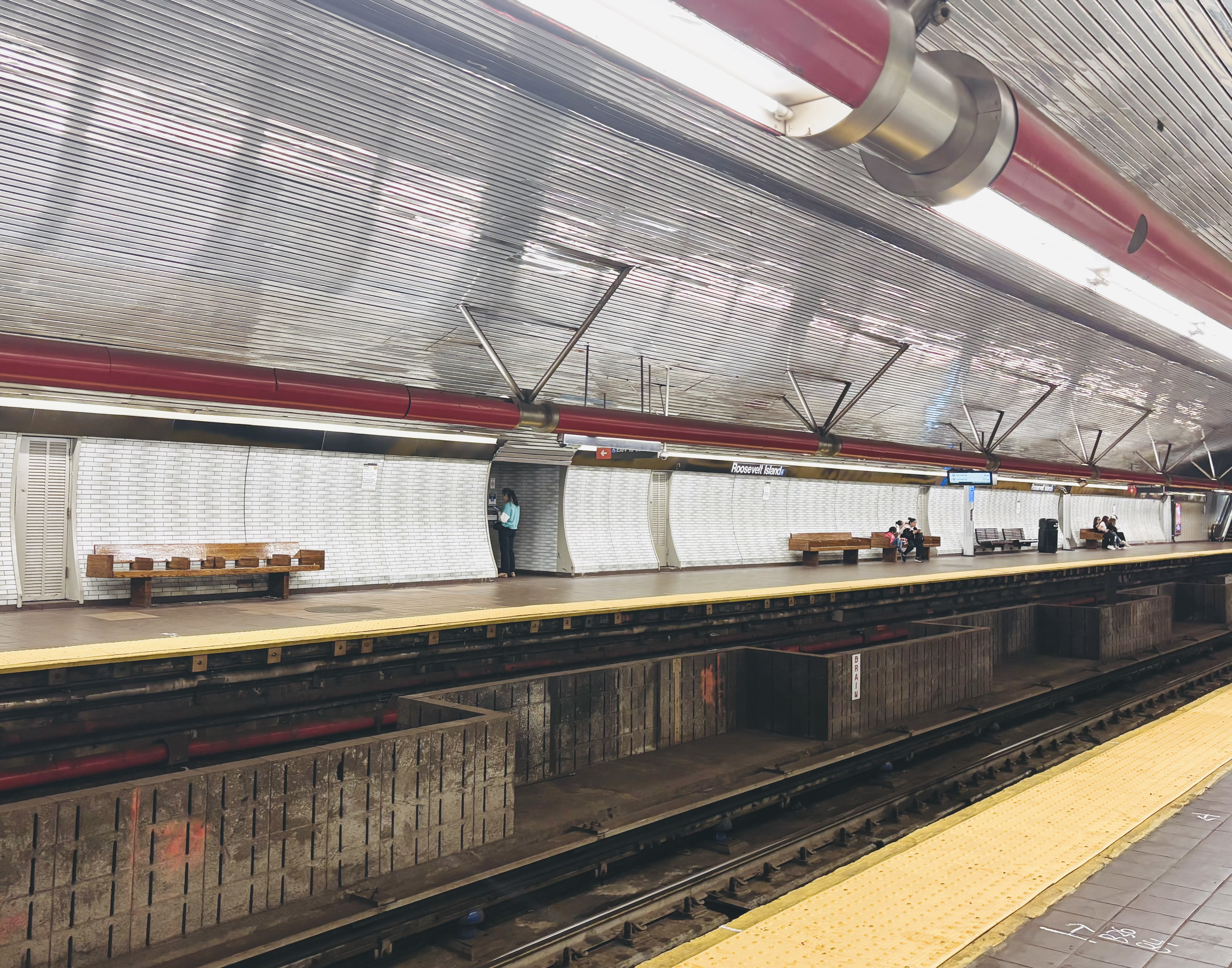
- Manhattan-bound platform

Station statistics
- Address: Main Street near Road 5 New York, New York
- Borough: Manhattan
- Locale: Roosevelt Island
- Coordinates: 40.759188°N 73.953438°W
- Division: B (IND)
- Line: IND 63rd Street Line
- Services: F (late nights and weekends); M (weekdays during the day)
- Transit: Roosevelt Island Tramway; MTA Bus: Q102; RIOC: Red Bus, Octagon Express; NYC Ferry: Astoria route
- Structure: Underground
- Depth: 100 feet (30.5 m)
- Platforms: 2 side platforms
- Tracks: 2

Other information
- Opened: October 29, 1989; 37 years ago
- Accessible: Yes

Traffic
- 2025: 2,265,376 ▲22.5%
- Rank: 160 out of 423
Services
Preceding station	New York City Subway	Following station
Lexington Avenue–63rd Street F M toward Middle Village–Metropolitan Avenue	M (New York City Subway service)	21st Street–Queensbridge F M toward Forest Hills–71st Avenue
Location
Location within New York City Subway
Location within New York City
Location within New York
Track layout
Street map
Station service legend
Symbol	Description
Stops all times	Stops all times
Stops all times except late nights	Stops all times except late nights
Stops rush hours in the peak direction only (limited service)	Stops rush hours in the peak direction only (limited service)
Stops weekdays during the day	Stops weekdays during the day
Stops late nights and weekends	Stops late nights and weekends

The Roosevelt Island station is a station on the IND 63rd Street Line of the New York City Subway. Located in Manhattan on Roosevelt Island in the East River, it is served by the M train on weekdays during the day and the F train during weekends and nights.

The Roosevelt Island station was first proposed in 1965, when the New York City Transit Authority (NYCTA) announced that it would build a subway station to encourage transit-oriented development on Roosevelt Island. The station and the rest of the 63rd Street Line were built as part of the Program for Action, a wide-ranging subway expansion program, starting in the late 1960s. When construction of the line was delayed, the Roosevelt Island Tram was built in 1973. The Roosevelt Island Operating Corporation was formed in 1984 to develop the island, but was not successful until October 1989 when the subway station opened along with the rest of the 63rd Street Line. The opening encouraged the development of the island, which has made the station busier.

Until December 2001, this was the second-to-last stop of the line, which terminated one stop east at 21st Street–Queensbridge. In 2001, the 63rd Street Tunnel Connection opened, allowing trains from the IND Queens Boulevard Line to use the line. Since the opening of the connection, the line has been served by F trains, and the subway then became the second means for direct travel between the island and Queens, supplementing the buses that had been operating over the Roosevelt Island Bridge. The station is one of the system's deepest, at 100 feet (30 m) below ground, because the line passes under the West and East Channels of the East River at either end of the station.

== History ==
Roosevelt Island was once home to a penitentiary and some asylums, as well as being home to numerous hospitals. It was originally called Blackwell's Island, but in 1921 it became known as Welfare Island because of the numerous hospitals on the island. The island became neglected once the hospitals started closing and their buildings were left abandoned to decay. During the 1960s, some groups started proposing uses for the island.

=== Construction ===
On February 16, 1965, the New York City Transit Authority announced plans to construct a subway station on the island along the planned 63rd Street Line, as part of the island's proposed transit-oriented development (TOD). TOD tries to increase the amount of residential, business and leisure space within walking distance of public transport. With this announcements, more suggestions for what to do with the island were made. The construction of a station was viewed to be vital for the development of the island, which was still known as Welfare Island. At that point, it was decided to build a shell for the station, to allow for the station to open after the opening of the rest of the line, with a projected savings of $4 million compared to building the station as an infill station after the rest of the line opened. The projected cost of the station was $3.3 million. It was soon decided to build the station with the rest of the line.

The current 63rd Street Line was the final version of proposals for a northern midtown tunnel from the IND Queens Boulevard Line to the Second and Sixth Avenue lines, which date back to the IND Second System of the 1920s and 1930s. The current plans were drawn up in the 1960s under the MTA's Program For Action, where the 63rd Street subway line was to be built in the upper portion of the bi-level 63rd Street Tunnel.

Beginning in the mid-1970s, Roosevelt Island was redeveloped to accommodate low- to mid-income housing projects. However, there was no direct transit connection to Manhattan. The subway was delayed and still under construction; trolley tracks that formerly served Roosevelt Island via the Queensboro Bridge were unusable; and the only way on and off the island was via the Roosevelt Island Bridge to Queens. An aerial tram route, the Roosevelt Island Tramway, was opened in May 1976 as a "temporary" connection to Manhattan. The Roosevelt Island Operating Corporation was formed in 1984 to develop the island, but was not successful until October 1989 when the subway station opened along with the rest of the 63rd Street Line. After that, a high-rise luxury apartment building with some subsidized housing opened.

The project faced extensive delays. As early as 1976, the Program for Action had been reduced to seven stations on the Archer Avenue and 63rd Street lines and was not projected to be complete for another decade. By October 1980, officials considered stopping construction on the 63rd Street line. The MTA voted in 1984 to connect the Queens end of the tunnel to the local tracks of the IND Queens Boulevard Line at a cost of $222 million. The section of the line up to Long Island City was projected to open by the end of 1985, but flooding in the tunnel caused the opening to be delayed indefinitely. The MTA's contractors concluded in February 1987 that the tunnel was structurally sound, and the federal government's contractors affirmed this finding in June 1987.

=== Opening ===
The station opened on October 29, 1989, along with the entire IND 63rd Street Line. The opening of the subway resulted in a steep decline in Roosevelt Island Tramway ridership. The Q train served the station on weekdays and the B train stopped there on weekends and late nights; both services used the Sixth Avenue Line. For the first couple of months after the station opened, the JFK Express to Kennedy Airport ran on the line, but did not serve the station, until it was discontinued on April 15, 1990. The tunnel had gained notoriety as the "tunnel to nowhere" both during its planning and after its opening; the line's northern terminus at 21st Street–Queensbridge, one stop after Roosevelt Island, was not connected to any other subway station or line in Queens. The connection to the Queens Boulevard Line began construction in 1994 and was completed and opened in 2001, almost thirty years after construction of the 63rd Street Tunnel began. Since then, the F train has been rerouted to serve this station at all times.

At an April 14, 2008, news conference, Governor David Paterson announced that the MTA would power a substantial portion of the station using tidal energy generated by turbines located in the East River, which are part of the Roosevelt Island Tidal Energy Project. This was part of a larger MTA initiative to use sustainable energy resources within the subway system. The initiative stalled due to development problems, but was revived in October 2020. To save energy, the MTA installed variable-speed escalators at Roosevelt Island and three other subway stations in August 2008, although not all of the escalators initially functioned as intended.

From August 28, 2023, through April 1, 2024, F trains were rerouted via the 53rd Street Tunnel between Queens and Manhattan due to track replacement and other repairs in the 63rd Street Tunnel, and an F shuttle train ran between Lexington Avenue-63rd Street and 21st Street–Queensbridge at all times except late nights, stopping at Roosevelt Island. In October 2024, the MTA completed esthetic improvements to the station as part of its Re-New-Vation program. On December 8, 2025, the M train began serving the station on weekdays during the day, running via the 63rd Street Tunnel. The F train began running via the 53rd Street Tunnel during the day, operating via the 63rd Street Tunnel during weekends and nights.

== Station layout ==
The station has two tracks and two side platforms. The M train serves the station on weekdays during the day, while the F train serves the station during weekends and nights. The next station to the north is 21st Street–Queensbridge, while the next station to the south is Lexington Avenue–63rd Street. At about 100 feet (30 m) below street level, the deep-level Roosevelt Island station is the fourth-deepest in the New York City Subway, behind the 34th Street–Hudson Yards, 190th Street, and 191st Street stations, also in Manhattan. Due to its depth, the station contains several features not common in the rest of the system. Similar to stations of the Paris Metro and Washington Metro, the Roosevelt Island station was built with a high vaulted ceiling and a mezzanine directly visible above the tracks. (Note: These features can also be found on some of the system's other deep stations, including Grand Central, 168th Street, and 181st Street stations, along with future stations along the Second Avenue Subway.)

As with other stations constructed as part of the Program for Action, the Roosevelt Island station contained technologically advanced features such as air-cooling, noise insulation, CCTV monitors, public announcement systems, electronic platform signage, and escalator and elevator entrances. The station is fully ADA-accessible, with elevators to street level. West of the station, there is a diamond crossover and two bellmouths that curve southward toward an unbuilt portion of the Second Avenue Subway. The lower level of the 63rd Street Tunnel contains an emergency exit to the station. The lower level, opened in 2023 as part of the East Side Access project, is used by Long Island Rail Road trains.

The Roosevelt Island station is one of two subway stations in Manhattan that are not located on Manhattan Island itself, the other being the Marble Hill–225th Street station on the 1 train. It is also one of two New York City Subway stations located on its own island, the other being the Broad Channel station in Queens, serving the A and S trains.

=== Exit ===
Fare control is in a glass-enclosed headhouse building off of Main Street. The headhouse has a feature that is unusual to the subway system: it uses recordings of birds to try to scare away city pigeons, and these bird recordings play every few minutes. The system was installed because of problems with pigeons entering the headhouse and leaving feathers and droppings both inside and around the building. Previous efforts, like spiked ledges, had been ineffective in curbing the pigeon population of the area immediately next to the station.

== Ridership ==
When the station opened in 1989, daily ridership on the Roosevelt Island Tramway, an aerial tramway that also connects Roosevelt Island to Manhattan, decreased sharply, from 5,500 daily riders in 1989 to 3,000 by 1993. In 2008, the subway station saw about 5,900 daily riders, compared to 3,000 for the tram, which had maintained steady ridership. Over the next eight years, the station experienced additional ridership growth. In 2016, an average of 6,630 daily riders used the station on an average weekday. This amounted to 2,110,471 total riders entering the station in 2016. Large crowds during the 2019 cherry blossom festival at Four Freedoms Park forced NYPD to ask MTA to close the station, trapping thousands on the island.

== Nearby points of interest ==
The station serves several destinations on Roosevelt Island. On the northern part of the island is the Bird S. Coler Hospital, a large city-owned facility. On the southern portion of the island, Cornell University and Technion – Israel Institute of Technology opened their new 2-million-square-foot (190,000 m^{2}) Cornell Tech campus, which will focus on new applied science and technology, in September 2017. On Main Street is the Good Shepherd Church, which was built in 1888 and is on the National Register of Historic Places. A ballfield on the island is named Firefighters Field in honor of three firefighters that died while trying to save lives in the September 11 attacks. The Roosevelt Island Tramway, which was intended to be replaced by the subway, is still in service with a terminal just south of the subway entrance. It is used by commuters and tourists alike.

== Gallery ==
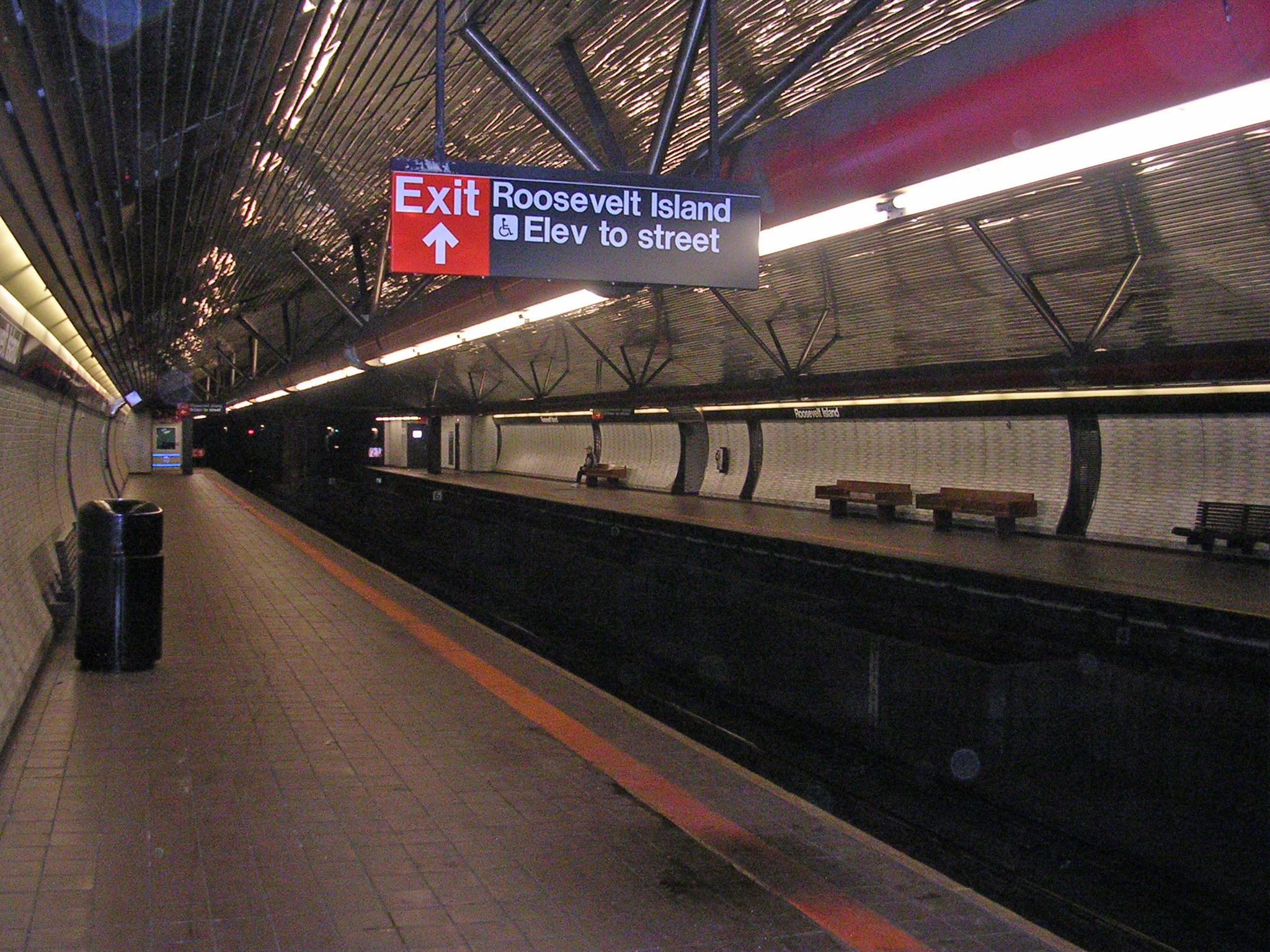
Western end of the station

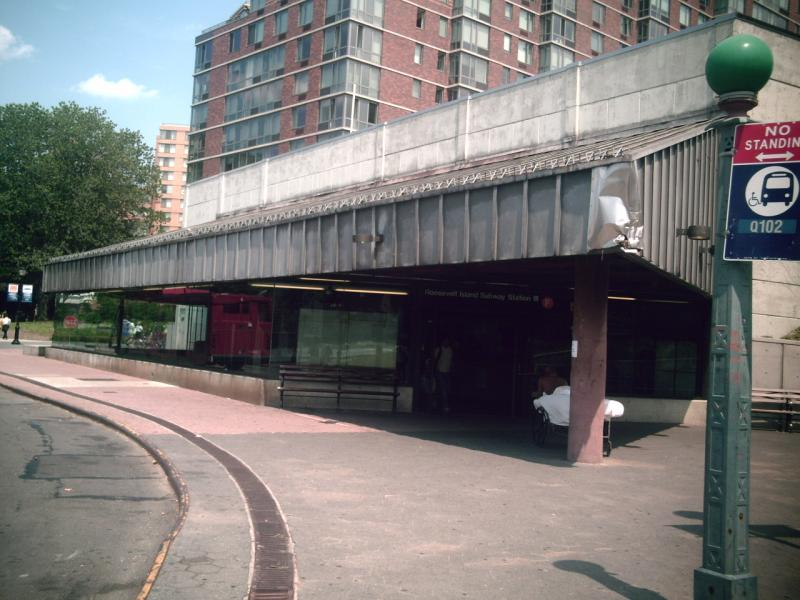
A view of the station's only exit, which is located on Main Street

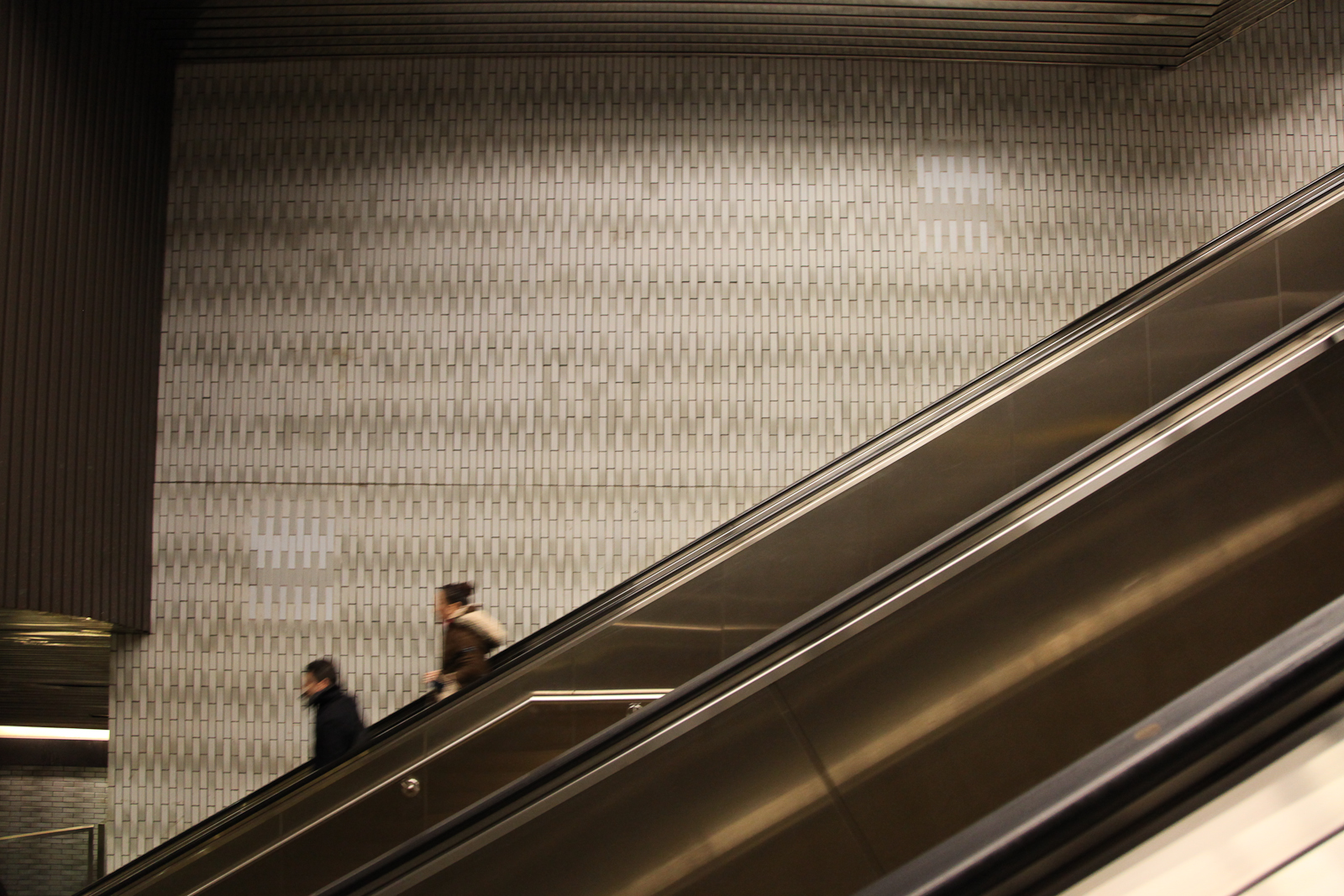
This long escalator between the mezzanine and the headhouse is necessary as the station is deep enough to pass under the East River.
