= Roosevelt Island Operating Corporation =

New York State public-benefit corporation

Overview
- Locale: Roosevelt Island, Manhattan, New York City
- Transit type: Local bus, Aerial Tramway
- Number of lines: 1 bus 1 aerial tramway
- Daily ridership: 1,566
- Chief executive: B.J. Jones (President and Chief Executive Officer)
- Headquarters: 591 Main Street, Roosevelt Island, NY 10044
- Website: https://rioc.ny.gov

Operation
- Began operation: 1984
- Operator: New York State
- Number of vehicles: 8 buses

The Roosevelt Island Operating Corporation (RIOC) is a New York State public-benefit corporation responsible for developing Roosevelt Island, a small island in the East River that is part of the New York City borough of Manhattan.

== Organization ==
RIOC is guided by a 5-member board of directors. Its management team is headed by President and CEO B.J. Jones, who reports to the board. In 2017, it had operating expenses of $26.09 million and a level of staffing of 175 people.

== History ==
Roosevelt Island Operating Corporation was created by New York State in 1984 to manage development and operations of Roosevelt Island. Before RIOC there existed other state agencies which ran the island's day-to-day operations such as the Welfare Island Development Corporation and later the Roosevelt Island Development Corporation. The first RIOC Board and President were appointed by the Governor in 1986.

The New York State Urban Development Corporation (UDC) operated New York City’s Welfare Island, as Roosevelt Island was previously known, prior to RIOC. Development of the island was based on the principles of urban "new communities" under President Lyndon Johnson’s "Great Society" programs of the 1960s and early 1970s, and development of the "new" community there was authorized by the 99-year ground lease and accompanying General Development Plan (GDP) agreed upon by New York City and New York State in 1969. The NY State GDP, which has been amended from time to time, provides for the development of housing, shops and community facilities for a mixed-income, handicap-accessible residential neighborhood.

Roosevelt Island requires specialized operations and infrastructure maintenance such as the aerial tramway, an on-island bus system, an underground pneumatic tube garbage collection system, and seawall improvements. Basic services such as MTA stops on the subway (Roosevelt Island station) and bus routes (Q102 bus), as well as water and sewage input and output, are provided by other agencies such as the MTA and the City of New York. Meanwhile, RIOC supplements these services with its own specialized operations, infrastructure, and capital improvements.

Today, the Roosevelt Island Operating Corporation manages a mixed-income community of about 12,000 residents featuring numerous parks and greenspaces, recreational facilities, and six city-designated landmark buildings. The waterfront promenade circling the island provides panoramic views of New York City icons such as the United Nations Headquarters, the Empire State Building, the Chrysler Building, the Queensboro Bridge, and the landmarked Pepsi-Cola sign in Queens.

== Transportation ==
Roosevelt Island Red Bus
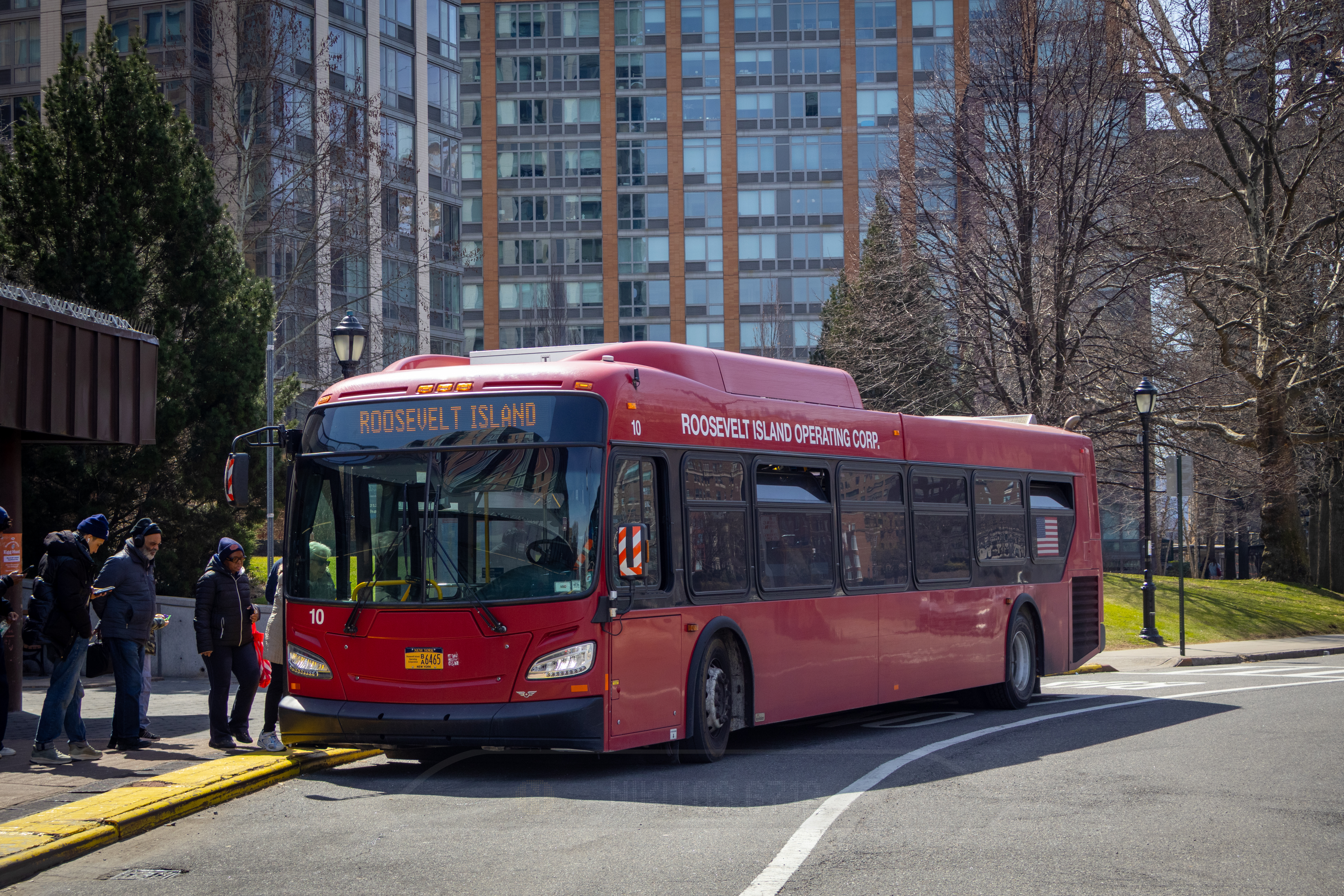
- 2018 New Flyer XD40 picks up passengers nearby the Roosevelt Island Subway Station.
- Parent: Roosevelt Island Operating Corporation
- Locale: Roosevelt Island
- Service area: Roosevelt Island - Octagon, Main Street, Tramway, Cornell Tech
- Service type: Shuttle bus
- Routes: 3
- Fleet: see below
- Fuel type: Diesel and Hybrid
- Operator: Roosevelt Island Operating Corporation
- Chief executive: Shelton J. Haynes
- Website: Official website

The Roosevelt Island Operating Corporation operates the Roosevelt Island Tram and the Red Bus, which connects the tram to island locations. The bus service started charging a small fare in 1991; the fare was completely removed in 2014.

=== Routes ===
Route	Termini			Streets traveled	Times
Red Bus	Octagon Apartments; 888 Main Street (Most Times) or Coler Rehabilitation and Nursing Care (Rush Hours only)	↔	Southpoint Park	Main Street, East Drive, West Drive	Monday-Sunday, 5:30AM–2:30AM, Fridays and Saturdays extended to 3:30AM (every 15 minutes)
Octagon; Express	Octagon Apartments; 888 Main Street	↔	Tramway station, Roosevelt Island (East)	Main Street, East and West Drives	Monday-Friday, 7AM-10AM (every 20 minutes)
Shoppers Special	Costco, Astoria, Queens; 32-50 Vernon Boulevard	↔	Roosevelt Island Senior Center; 546 Main Street	Main Street, Vernon Boulevard	Every Tuesday and Wednesday at 10:30AM

=== Bus roster ===
Active Fleet
Fleet Number(s)	Photo	Year	Make	Model	Notes
6	RIOCLot	2009	OBI	Orion VII NG HEV (07.501)	Runs mainly during rush hours
160-161		2016	New Flyer	XD40 Xcelsior	#8 was renumbered to #160 in August 2026.; #9 was renumbered to #161 in September 2026.; Purchased to replace Orion VII OG HEV buses due to unreliability
10-11	RIOC10	2018	New Flyer	XD40 Xcelsior	#8 was renumbered to #160 in August 2026.; #9 was renumbered to #161 in September 2026.; Purchased to replace Orion VII OG HEV buses due to unreliability
0.5/S-24	RIOC S-24	2024	Ford/Glaval	E-450	Temporary use as of September 3, 2024.; Used mainly between the hours of 11 PM and 1 AM.; Also known by RIOC staff as 0.5, officially numbered S-24
250-251		2025	New Flyer	XD40 Xcelsior	Purchased to replace Orion VII NG buses
Retired Fleet
Fleet Number(s)	Photo	Year	Make	Model	Notes
1-4	VII OG#2	2005	OBI	Orion VII OG HEV (07.501)	Retired in 2018; 1 and 2 were bought by the Port Authority for JFK shuttle use
1-3, 6, 8		1994	New Flyer	D40LF	Likely retired by the purchase of buses 1-4 and 5-6
5	VII NG#5	2009	OBI	Orion VII NG HEV (07.501)	Stopped running in mid-2023.; Officially retired in September 2024.
7		2007	OBI	Orion VII NG HEV (07.501)	Ex-MTA Demo #1291.; Retired June 2023.
Future Fleet
Fleet Number(s)	Photo	Year	Make	Model	Notes
(1 bus)		(TBD)	New Flyer	XDE40 Xcelsior	Order currently under consideration to replace bus #6 (see above).

== AVAC ==
RIOC operates the island's high-tech sanitation system, called automated vacuum collection (AVAC). In this system, a computer turns on the trash receptacles in each building every hour, opening a valve that releases garbage into one of two underground pipes. These pipes then suck the garbage into the AVAC complex, where dust and waste are filtered, packaged, and released. When the system was installed, the only other pneumatic garbage system in the US was in Walt Disney World.

== Public safety ==
The Roosevelt Island Public Safety Department (RIPSD) protects the island's property including all facilities by patrolling certain contracted residential buildings 24 hours a day, 7 days a week.

The New York City Police Department is the primary policing and investigation agency within New York City as per the NYC Charter, which includes all of Roosevelt Island.

RIPSD Officers are designated as Special Patrolmen in connection with special assignment of employment, and such designation confers very limited Peace Officer powers upon the employee pursuant to New York State Criminal Procedure Law § 2.20 (27). The exercise of these powers is limited to the employee's geographical area of employment and only while such employee is actually working. RIPSD special patrolmen are prohibited by New York State Law and employee restriction to carry a firearm.

Officers complete a basic peace officers course which includes training in law, police science, powers of a peace officer, self-defense/tactics, arrest procedures and basic life support/CPR. There is also an additional eight weeks of field training which new officers must satisfactorily complete as part of their supplemental training. For those seeking the certification, there is bicycle training.

== Parks and recreation ==
RIOC maintains and rents out sports fields around the island for public use. The Sportspark exercise facility at the southern end of Roosevelt Island features a pool, basketball court, fitness center, and a rec room with billiards, ping pong, and air hockey.

== See also ==
- Hudson River Park Trust
- Hugh L. Carey Battery Park City Authority
- Lower Manhattan Development Corporation
- Municipal Assistance Corporation for the City of NY
- New York Convention Center Operating Corporation
- United Nations Development Corporation
