= Roosevelt Island Tramway =

Aerial tram line in New York City

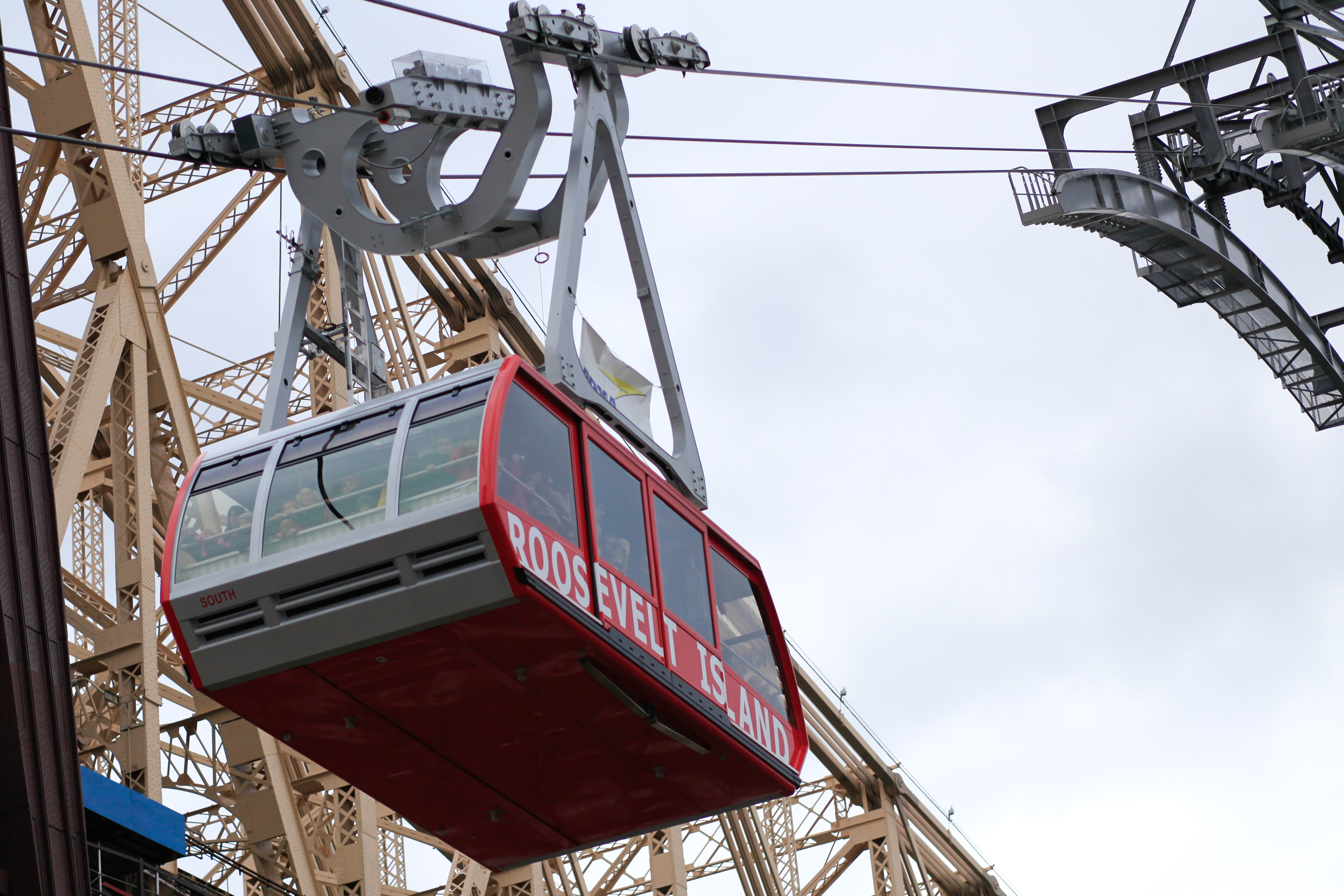
- Interactive map of Roosevelt Island Tramway

Overview
- Status: Operational
- Character: Commuter
- Location: Manhattan, New York City, U.S.
- Coordinates: 40.7574°N 73.9541°W
- Termini: Upper East Side (west); Roosevelt Island (east)
- Elevation: highest: 250 ft (76 m)
- No. of stations: 2
- Services: Roosevelt Island
- Open: May 17, 1976
- Reopened: November 30, 2010
- Website: www.rioc.ny.gov/community/transportation/tram

Operation
- Owner: Roosevelt Island Operating Corporation
- Operator: Leitner-Poma
- No. of carriers: 2
- Carrier capacity: 110
- Ridership: 2,146,128 (FY 2023)
- Operating times: 6:00 a.m. to 2:00 a.m. (weekdays); 6:00 a.m. to 3:30 a.m. (weekends)
- Headway: 7.5–15 minutes
- Fare: $3.00

Technical features
- Aerial lift type: Aerial tramway
- Manufactured by: Von Roll
- Line length: 3,140 ft (960 m)
- Operating speed: 17 mph (27 km/h)

The Roosevelt Island Tramway is an aerial tramway that crosses the East River in New York City, connecting Roosevelt Island to the Upper East Side of Manhattan. The tramway is the first commuter aerial tramway in the U.S., having opened on May 17, 1976, to serve residential developments on Roosevelt Island. The tram is operated by Leitner-Poma on behalf of the Roosevelt Island Operating Corporation of the State of New York.

Before the tramway opened, Roosevelt Island had been accessed via the Roosevelt Island Bridge from Queens, which had opened in 1955. Starting in the late 1960s, the 63rd Street subway line was built to connect new developments on the island to Manhattan. Due to delays in the subway's construction, the tramway was proposed in 1971 and approved in 1973, initially as a temporary mode of transport. The tramway carried 1.25 million riders in its first year and remained popular thereafter, despite intermittent closures. Ridership declined sharply after the subway opened in 1989, though the tramway remained in operation. Following two major breakdowns in the mid-2000s, the tramway was rebuilt from March to November 2010. The stations were renovated in the late 2010s.

Originally, the tram used two 125-person cabins that were hauled by the same cable. After the 2010 renovation, the cabins were replaced with 110-person vehicles that could operate independently. The cabins travel 3,140 feet (960 m) between an at-grade terminal on Roosevelt Island and an elevated terminal on Manhattan Island. The route operates at all times except late nights, with headways of 7.5 to 15 minutes. The tramway uses the same fare structure and collection equipment as the city's bus and subway systems, and fares can be paid with mobile or payment card tap-to-pay or OMNY card. Over the years, the Roosevelt Island Tramway has been the subject of commentary and praised as an icon of New York City, and it has been depicted in several works of media.

== History ==
=== Background ===
What is now Roosevelt Island was, until the mid-20th century, known as Blackwell's Island or Welfare Island; it was largely occupied by hospitals and asylums. The Queensboro Bridge, which connected the island with Queens and Manhattan, opened in 1909. A trolley (streetcar) line ran across the bridge when it opened, stopping in the middle of the bridge at an elevator that took passengers down to the island. The trolley remained in service until April 7, 1957, as the last trolley line in New York state; a bridge to Queens had been completed two years earlier.

After the state government leased Welfare Island from the city in 1969, several large housing developments were built there in the early 1970s, necessitating the construction of a public transit connection. Welfare Island was renamed Roosevelt Island in 1973, and residents began moving onto the island in mid-1975. The Roosevelt Island subway station on the 63rd Street Line was being developed to serve the new community, but the entire line was delayed significantly by the mid-1970s. The first residents of Roosevelt Island had to travel through Queens to leave the island, making it difficult to travel to and from Manhattan via car.

=== Development ===
==== Planning ====
Because of the delays in building the subway line, an alternative mode of transportation between Manhattan and Roosevelt Island had to be devised. At a meeting of Manhattan Community Board 8 in September 1971, the Welfare Island Development Corporation proposed an aerial tramway, which the board narrowly approved the next month. The tram was to run between the Motorgate parking garage on Welfare Island and 72nd Street on Manhattan's Upper East Side, with two 120-passenger cabins that ascended 200 feet (61 m) above the East River. The Christian Science Monitor wrote that the tramway "ought to be the classiest transportation buy in New York City". Although the 72nd Street location had been selected because it was far from the subway, wealthy Manhattan residents objected to the tramway's terminal being placed there.

The Urban Development Corporation (UDC), a New York state agency, had studied the feasibility of a ferry, a bus, and an aerial tramway by 1972. Ferry routes to 34th, 63rd, and 71st Streets were studied but were ruled out due to high operating costs, lack of mass-transit connections, and lack of union support. Other alternatives under consideration included an elevator extending directly from the Queensboro Bridge. UDC architect William Chafee proposed an aerial tramway, which was ultimately selected because it was cheap, direct, and fit into Roosevelt Island's quiet character. By early 1973, the UDC was finalizing plans for a tramway, which was to be the first commuter aerial tramway in the U.S. The tramway was to be the main means of travel between Roosevelt Island and Manhattan, and it was intended as a temporary mode of transit until the subway was completed. The plans called for two 125-passenger cabins that would travel 2,470 feet (750 m) across the East River's western channel, just south of the Queensboro Bridge. Officials hoped the tramway would help the UDC's sales campaigns for the island.

Residents of Sutton Place, a street facing the East River in Manhattan, opposed the tramway plan because they felt the tramway would cause urban blight. The United States Coast Guard also needed to approve the project because it crossed a navigable waterway. In September 1973, the route was changed to the north side of the Queensboro Bridge after property owners protested; UDC president Ed Logue said that "no prominent people lived" near the bridge's north side. The next month, the New York City Board of Estimate approved the aerial tramway. The state government was given a franchise for the tramway in December 1973, allowing construction to begin.

==== Construction ====
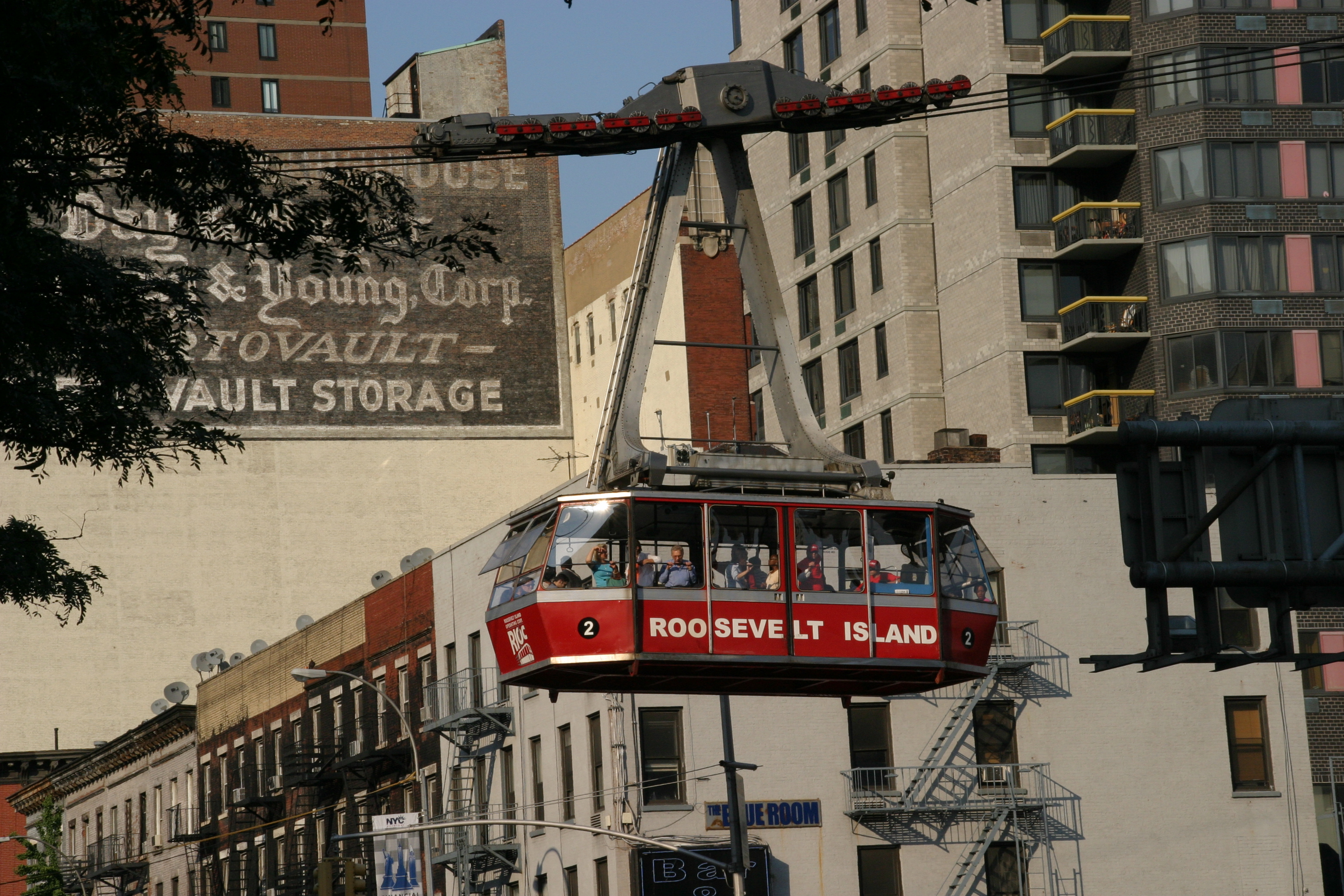
One of the original tram cabins in Manhattan

Swiss firm Von Roll was selected to supply and erect the tram and its equipment, in part because, according to the New York Daily News, Von Roll made the "Cadillac of tramways". VSL, a subsidiary of Von Roll, installed the equipment. The United States Army Corps of Engineers solicited public comments on the tramway plan in January 1974. The footpath on the Queensboro Bridge was shuttered that July in preparation for the tramway's opening, and a pair of lampposts at the Manhattan end of the Queensboro Bridge were removed to make way for the tramway. On the Roosevelt Island side, work was delayed because of the need to relocate the island's municipal laundry building.

Work on the route began the first week of October 1974. Construction, initially scheduled to be completed by around September 1975, was delayed due to the UDC's financial issues. An interim commuter bus to Manhattan via Queens was launched in March 1975; the bus route took up to an hour to reach Manhattan, whereas the tramway was expected to take five minutes. The tramway's engineer, David Ozerkis, predicted the next month that construction would be complete within the year. By that April, two of three tramway towers were finished.

The towers for the tram route were erected by July 1975, when completion was projected for that December. The first cables for the tramway were installed the next month. Construction was delayed various times, in part due to strikes and inclement weather. The delays prompted numerous unfounded rumors about the route, including conjecture that the cabins were involved in collisions or were being secretly run at night. During an initial test of the route in February 1976, a tram hit a light pole, forcing the removal of the pole. By March of that year, the route was complete, and it only needed additional testing and state government approval before it could open to the public. The tramway had cost $6.25 million or $6.8 million to build (equivalent to $27–29 million in 2024) It was funded by bonds that had been issued to fund the development of Roosevelt Island. The equipment and vehicles had cost at least $2 million (equivalent to $9 million in 2024), while the support towers and stations cost another $4.25 million (equivalent to $18 million in 2024).

=== Opening and early operations ===
==== 1970s ====
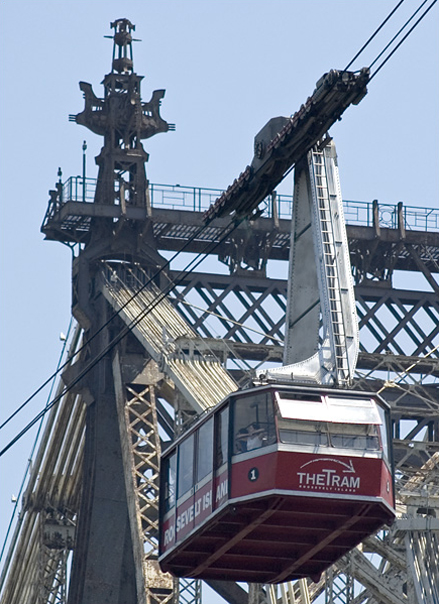
An old tram car crossing the East River, 2005

The tramway route opened on May 17, 1976. As built, there was one elevator at the Manhattan terminal; the Roosevelt Island terminal was at ground level. The first staff members included an unemployed firefighter who, according to The New York Times, said that his knowledge of "rescue procedures" had gotten him the job. The city's franchise to the UDC mandated that the tram's fare be at least 25 cents more expensive than the subway's fare, preventing the tram from drawing away subway riders. The route was free on its opening day, but rides were 50 cents (equivalent to $3 in 2025) thereafter. Following Roosevelt Island residents' complaints, the UDC stopped selling fares in Manhattan, gave "priority passes" to Roosevelt Island residents, limited the capacity of each tram, and prohibited several activities onboard. Bicycles were allowed in the cabins, but the UDC gave priority to passengers.

Paul Goldberger of The New York Times wrote that Roosevelt Island's popularity rose significantly after the tramway opened, while a writer for the Gannett News Service said the tramway had become both a tourist attraction in itself and an icon of the island. After the UDC fired the original operator, ITT Inc., it hired VSL International to run the tram in January 1977; there was no bidding process before VSL received the contract. VSL's staff of 20 tram operators (who also worked as station attendants), six mechanics, and four console operators worked three shifts of eight hours each. The UDC received a $2 million annual subsidy from the state government (equivalent to $8 million in 2024) for the tramway and other projects on Roosevelt Island.

In 1977—its first full year of operation—the tramway recorded an $800,000 deficit (equivalent to $3,223,000 in 2024). The tramway's liability insurance policy cost $900,000 per year (equivalent to $3,625,000 in 2024), almost equal to its revenue from fares; such an expensive insurance cost was necessitated by the fact that there were no other aerial commuter tramways in the U.S. In addition, operating expenses amounted to $1 million a year (equivalent to $4 million in 2024), and the state government was essentially paying a 95-cent subsidy for every rider. Despite the lack of any major accidents, the tramway continued to have high insurance costs in 1978. This prompted governor Hugh Carey to ask his aides to study the feasibility of having the Metropolitan Transportation Authority (MTA) take over the line. The tramway was shuttered in mid-November 1978 so workers could replace the haul cable, which was beyond the end of its service life. The cable replacement project cost $75,000 and took two weeks. Afterward, the tramway had to be closed every two years so workers could replace the haul cable.

==== 1980s ====
A plaza around the tram's Manhattan terminal was established in 1980. After the tram was closed in November 1980 for haul cable replacement, the new cable fell twice in one month, prompting investigations by the state government. The months-long closure caused overcrowding on Queens bus routes and did not end until March 1981. The extended closure of the tramway had also prompted proposals for a year-round ferry to Roosevelt Island, but interest in the ferry disappeared after the tram reopened. (Note: A separate ferry from Roosevelt Island to Lower Manhattan launched in 1986.) Further haul-cable replacements occurred in November 1983 and August 1985. Although both cabins were originally red, one of the cabins was repainted blue in 1984, prompting complaints from some residents. State officials warned in late 1985 that tram passengers could have to wait as long as 45 minutes if the subway line to Roosevelt Island were not completed within three years. The Roosevelt Island Operating Corporation (RIOC), a state agency created in 1984 to manage Roosevelt Island, took over the tram service when it was created.

The tramway's insurance cost $677,000 a year (equivalent to $1,638,000 in 2024) when the liability insurance policy expired in early 1986; at the time, the tram served 150,000 people a month. After the insurance expired, the New York State Senate failed to pass a bill that allowed the state to self-insure the tramway; the New York State Assembly, the state's other legislative body, had already approved the bill. This was in part due to objections from upstate politicians who wanted liability insurance for their communities as well. The route stopped running in February 1986. After the State Senate initially rejected the self-insurance bill again, it ultimately allowed the state government to pay $8 million a year in insurance (equivalent to $19 million in 2024), and the route reopened after two weeks. The State Senate failed to pass a separate bill that would formalize the state government's involvement in paying insurance. By mid-1986, the tramway was operating at full capacity. The tramway closed for a week in August 1986 due to an electrical issue, and the blue cabin was repainted red.

In mid-1989, mayor Ed Koch indicated that the tram might be closed after the subway opened. One local resident stated at the time: "For many Islanders, this could be a day that will live in infamy: When the subway finally comes, the cherished tram may go." The line was again temporarily closed that July, after nine riders were injured when a cabin crashed into the Manhattan terminal. Under an agreement with the city government, fares on the tramway were raised by 25 cents after the 63rd Street subway opened in October 1989. RIOC estimated that the tram would lose $1 million in a year (equivalent to $2 million in 2024) because of competition from the subway. When the subway opened, RIOC fired staff members and installed token machines in an effort to cut costs. New York magazine wrote that some residents opposed the tramway's closure because it provided a wheelchair-accessible connection to more bus routes in Manhattan than the subway did. Two thousand people signed a petition in support of saving the tramway, and RIOC said it had no plans to close the tram.

==== 1990s ====
Following decreases in rush-hour ridership of up to 45 percent, New York City Council member Robert Dryfoos sponsored legislation in April 1990 that would allow the city and state to continue operating the tram. Dryfoos's bill called for the city to stop charging the tramway a $136,000 annual franchise fee (equivalent to $288,000 in 2024); remove a requirement that a tram ride be more expensive than a subway ride; and allow students to ride the tram for free. The Board of Estimate agreed to provide discounted senior fares and free student fares; while the Office of Management and Budget agreed to fund the senior fares, the Department of Education would not pay for the student fares. RIOC also wanted the city government to attract tourists to the tram. In late 1990, NYNEX received permission to build a phone substation and an observation deck directly beneath the tramway, next to one of the support towers. Ultimately, the tramway remained as a permanent transit link. The tram was closed in October 1993 due to electrical issues and was repaired over the next three months. It reopened in February 1994 but closed again that July for a $2.1 million renovation (equivalent to $4 million in 2024).

During the 1990s, RIOC promoted various programs and events to increase its revenue and the tramway's ridership. To promote museums in Long Island City and Astoria, Queens, RIOC started selling "Tram Artlink" passes in 1994, which included tram tickets, connecting bus service, and museum admission. By 1995, further financial troubles forced RIOC to propose reducing service by four hours on weekdays and five hours on weekends. RIOC's agreement with the city government expired in 1995. Governor George Pataki announced in early 1996 that he wanted to eliminate all subsidies for RIOC, including subsidies for the tramway; at the time, the tram was operating at a $1 million annual loss (equivalent to $2 million in 2024). Despite protests from residents, the state stopped subsidizing the tramway the same year. With the elimination of the state subsidy, Roosevelt Island residents feared that the tram could not be repaired in an emergency, since many parts for the tram were manufactured in Switzerland and imported at a high cost. Residents also expressed concerns over decreases in service.

The tramway was again temporarily shuttered in January 1998 when a crane hit a cabin and injured 11 passengers; after the damaged cabin was repaired, the tramway reopened one week later. The tram was still losing $700,000 a year (equivalent to $1,253,000 in 2024), and twice as many people used the Roosevelt Island subway station as the tramway. Roosevelt Island's chief operating officer, Jerome Blue, wanted to reduce operating hours to save money, but many of the island's residents objected. In particular, disabled and senior residents preferred using the tram over the subway. The elevators to the subway station were often out of service, and the island's wheelchair-accessible buses traveled only to Queens. Blue also wanted to eliminate free fares for students, but this was unsuccessful, as was his attempt to cut back operating hours. By the late 1990s, tramway riders were advocating for free transfers to the bus and subway systems; at the time, riders had to pay another fare if they wanted to transfer.

=== 21st century ===
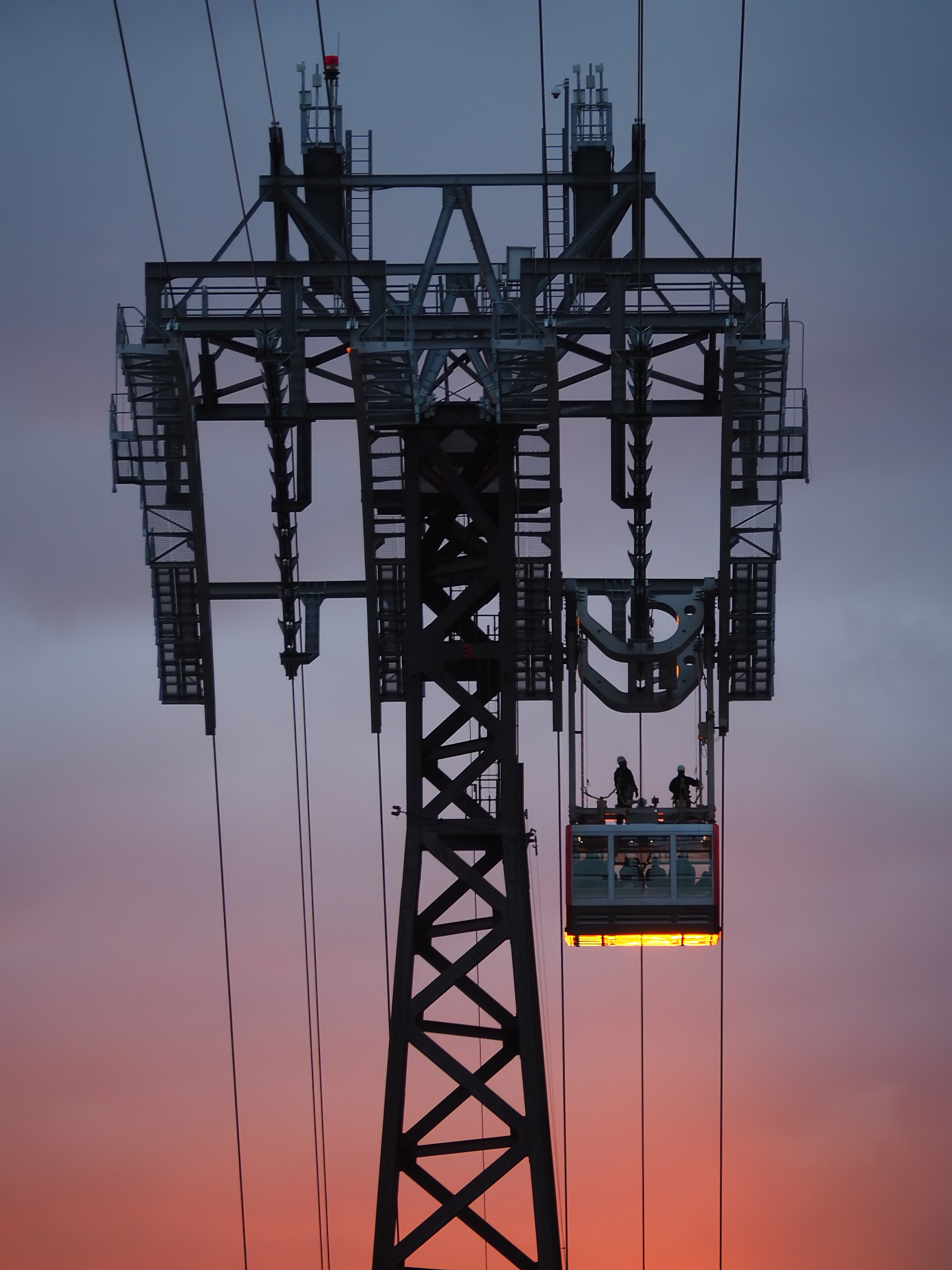
The tramway seen at dawn

==== 2000s: Increasing unreliability ====
By 2001, there were plans to halt all service from 10 p.m. to 2 a.m. due to low ridership. Each nighttime trip effectively received a $6.45 subsidy from the RIOC (equivalent to $11 in 2024), more than double the subsidy for each daytime trip, and the line was losing $1.7 million annually (equivalent to $3 million in 2024). The tramway was temporarily closed for cable replacement in November 2001. Although the closure was supposed to last one month, the tramway did not reopen until March 2002 because the original replacement cable was 8 feet (2.4 m) too short. During the closure, the cabins were also restored. The RIOC's chief operating officer Robert Ryan proposed running advertisements on the tram cabins in mid-2002 to reduce the line's operating deficit, though New York City Council speaker Gifford Miller said such advertisements were illegal. Ultimately, RIOC ran advertisements on the cabins despite not having received permission from the city.

The subway stopped accepting tokens as fare payment in May 2003, followed by the city's bus system that December, but the Roosevelt Island Tramway continued to use tokens exclusively. RIOC bought 7,000 tokens from the MTA so passengers could continue to pay fares. RIOC announced in January 2004 that the tramway's turnstiles would begin accepting MetroCards. The tramway switched to using MetroCards on March 1, 2004, allowing tram passengers to transfer to the subway or bus for free.

On September 2, 2005, more than 80 people were trapped on the tram for over 90 minutes, and an engineer had to be transported from his suburban home via helicopter to turn on a backup generator. After that incident, state inspectors issued two violations against the tramway and ordered RIOC to install a diesel backup or motor-generator system. On April 18, 2006, at about 5:22 p.m. EDT, the two trams stalled over the East River, trapping 69 people for up to eleven hours; they had to be rescued using a crane, as well as via a cage that traveled from one terminal to the stranded cabin. Both the primary and secondary power systems were not operational, and the backup system was in California for repairs. The tramway was closed indefinitely, and the cabins stalled twice more the same month while RIOC officials test-ran the tramway to ascertain the cause of the breakdown. In the meantime, RIOC spent $500,000 upgrading the power systems. By May 2006, the primary electrical system had been replaced, and officials wanted to reopen the tramway within three months. The tram's backup electrical systems were refurbished, and each cabin was equipped with emergency supplies.

The tramway resumed operations on September 1, 2006. Following the breakdown, officials announced that they would spend $15 million (equivalent to $22 million in 2024) on a major overhaul of the tramway in two or three years. The Manhattan terminal's plaza was renovated in 2007. By mid-2008, the renovation had increased to $25 million (equivalent to $36 million in 2024) and was to begin the following year. Local residents were concerned about the closure because the tram was one of three ways off the island, along with the subway and the Roosevelt Island Bridge.

==== 2010s to present ====
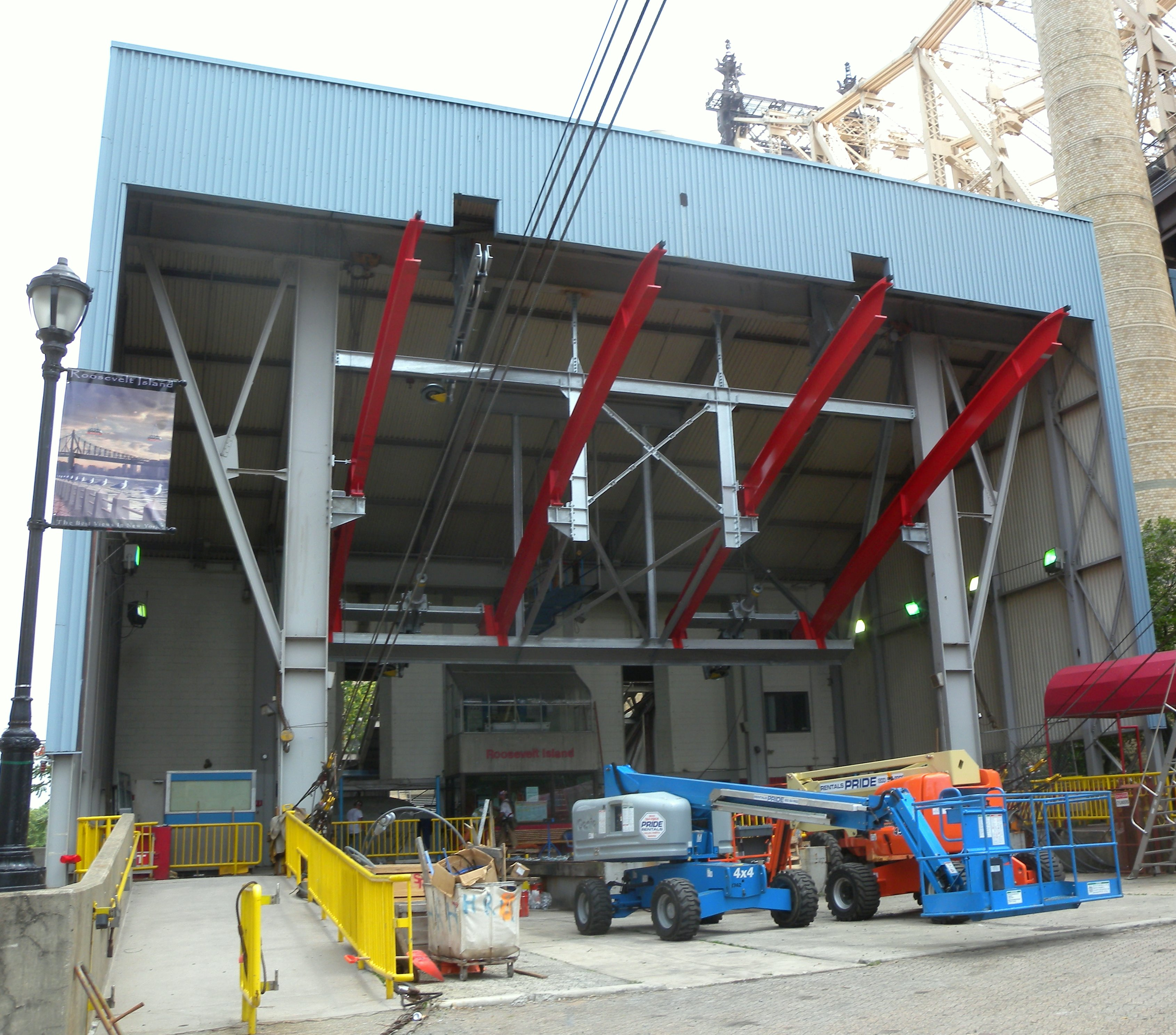
The Roosevelt Island terminal under renovation

On March 1, 2010, the tramway was closed for what was supposed to be a six-month renovation. French company Poma was hired for the project, which included replacing all components except for the three tower bases. The improvements included a new "dual haul" system that allowed the cabins to travel independently of each other; previously, the cabins had to be run simultaneously. The old cabins were to be preserved on Roosevelt Island, in a museum, or both. Work was delayed because of challenges in bringing a large crane to the island. The cabins were attached to the cables in October 2010, and test runs began in mid-November. The tramway reopened November 30, 2010, two months later than originally planned. The late opening was also attributed to delays in obtaining permits for construction, as well as inclement weather.

In the early 2010s, the Cornell Tech educational campus was planned on Roosevelt Island, and there were concerns that the tram and subway could not carry additional persons heading there. In 2016, engineering company GC Eng & Associates was hired to renovate the Manhattan terminal. Repairs to both terminals' platforms began in July 2017, during which one cabin was taken out of service at all times. Headways were increased to 15 minutes, which created severe overcrowding during rush hours. One of the cabins' gearboxes was also rebuilt in 2018. The platform reconstruction project was finished in February 2019, at which point RIOC was in the process of installing two elevators at the Manhattan terminal to replace the original elevator.

With the onset of the COVID-19 pandemic in New York City in 2020, ridership decreased significantly, and each cabin was limited to 24 percent its normal capacity. The elevators at the Manhattan terminal were completed in April 2022 for $7 million. This work also included an expansion of the Manhattan terminal's platform and renovations to the plaza underneath it. Installation of OMNY fare-payment readers on the Roosevelt Island Tramway was underway by mid-2023. On August 24, 2023, the Roosevelt Island Tramway started to accept OMNY fare payments. The launch of OMNY coincided with a long-term partial closure of the 63rd Street Line. The subway line's closure created more overcrowding during late 2023. By 2024, ridership exceeded pre COVID-19 levels after the tram appeared in tourists' social media posts; there were calls to give priority boarding to Roosevelt Island residents and employees due to increasing crowding. RIOC refused to implement a priority-boarding system, saying it violated a state law against giving "undue or unreasonable preference" to any group of riders.

== Description ==
As of 2022, the tramway is operated by Leitner-Poma under contract to the Roosevelt Island Operating Corporation. David I. Ozerkis, chief engineer of Roosevelt Island in the 1970s, designed the Roosevelt Island Tramway. Von Roll manufactured the tram and its equipment, and subsidiary VSL installed the equipment. In addition, Lev Zetlin of Lev Zetlin & Associates was the engineer for the Roosevelt Island Tramway, and Prentice & Chan and Ohlhausen were responsible for the route's two stations.

=== Route and stations ===
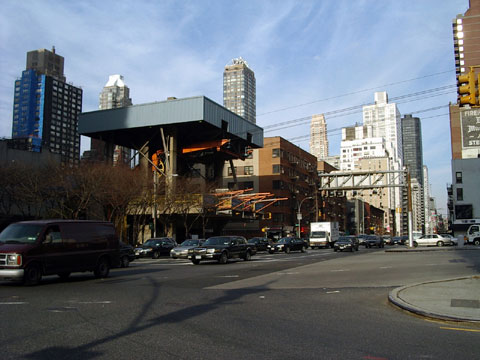
The Roosevelt Island Tramway's Manhattan terminal

The Roosevelt Island Tramway runs immediately to the north of, and parallel to, the Queensboro Bridge. This was a deliberate measure intended to prevent planes at low altitude from colliding with the tramway, as the bridge is much larger than the tramway. Although RIOC gives the tramway's total length as 3,140 feet (960 m), other publications give slightly differing lengths, such as Popular Mechanics, which in a 1976 article cited the tramway as measuring 3,094 feet (943 m) long. The tramway travels 1,184 feet (361 m) over the East River's western channel. The stretch over Roosevelt Island is nearly 300 feet (91 m) long, while the stretch over Manhattan is more than 1,600 feet (490 m) long.

==== Manhattan terminal ====
The Manhattan terminal is accessed through Tramway Plaza, on the west side of Second Avenue between 59th and 60th Streets. MTA Regional Bus Operations' M15, M15 SBS, M31, M57, Q32, Q60 buses stop near the terminal, while the New York City Subway's Lexington Avenue/59th Street station, served by the 4, 5, 6, <6>, N, R, and W trains, is one block west.

The terminal is six stories high. To avoid interfering with vehicular traffic, the Manhattan terminal is elevated; the platform is 18 feet (5.5 m) high. The station has two elevators, and there is also a set of stairs. Above the terminal is a concrete deck that could support a 32-story or 35-story building above, although such a building was never built. This deck is supported by four steel-and-concrete columns measuring 40 inches (1,000 mm) thick and 40 feet (12 m) tall. The eastern side of the terminal is cantilevered above the sidewalk of Second Avenue, providing space for an unexecuted widening of the avenue. The terminal's western side is also cantilevered and was intended to accommodate an unbuilt bus stop.

==== Roosevelt Island terminal ====
The terminal on Roosevelt Island is located at 300 Main Street and abuts the Southtown section of the island. At the Roosevelt Island terminal, there is a transfer to the Red Bus route, which offers transportation around the island for free. The MTA's Q102 bus and the subway's Roosevelt Island station (serving the F and M trains) are also near the Roosevelt Island terminal.

The Roosevelt Island terminal is at ground level. This terminal is clad in metal and is supported by a steel superstructure. The sides of the terminal were also fitted with windows, which permitted views of machinery inside the station. Within the Roosevelt Island terminal is a 2-foot-thick (0.61 m) shear wall that conceals the anchorages for the tramway's cables.

=== Cabins ===
==== Original cabins (1976–2010) ====
The original tram cabins measured 12 by 24 feet (3.7 by 7.3 m). Each of the old cabins weighed 18,300 pounds (8,300 kg) when empty. The vehicles could travel at 17 miles per hour (27 km/h) and could fit 125 people (including one attendant), for a total capacity of 1,800 people an hour. The original cabins were mostly standing-room only except for a few benches on the sides. The cabins had overhead leather straps, which were refurbished in the 1990s and removed in 2010; at the time, they were the only vehicles in New York City's transit system that used straps. The bottom sections of the exteriors were composed of bulky red metal panels, while the top sections had sliding windows, which wrapped around the vehicle. The roof of each cabin had an emergency escape hatch, a vent, and an asymmetrical A-shaped arm that ran along a set of track ropes.

Telephones in each cabin allowed operators to communicate with staff at either terminal. Each cabin also had three separate braking systems, as well as small consoles that allowed the attendants to semi-automatically control the cabins. There were rescue hatches on the floor of each cabin, which could be used to extricate riders if the tramway broke down over land. The old cabins were stored in the Motorgate parking garage after the 2010 renovation; in 2026, RIOC began soliciting proposals for the reuse of the old cabins.

==== Current cabins (2010–present) ====
Each of the new cabins weighs 22,125 pounds (10,036 kg) when empty. The vehicles move at about 17 mph (27 km/h) and have a capacity of 110 (including one attendant). The cabins are standing-room only, except for two benches on the sides, and contain metal grab bars. The exteriors of each vehicle have larger windows than the original cabins did. The roof of each cabin has a set of two arms, which are suspended from a pair of cables; this allows the cars to maintain stability in windy weather. The cabins are also powered by their own electric engines. The vehicles' doors are automatically operated, and there are digital screens inside. The cabins are also equipped with wireless communications systems. As a safety measure, when a cabin loses contact with the route's terminals, its braking systems stop it suddenly, which has sometimes caused the cabin to sway in midair. Since March 2026, the cabins have played automated announcements voiced by Charlie Pellett whenever they depart and arrive at the stations.

==== Rescue cages ====
If the cabins were to break down over water, riders can be brought to safety via a rescue cage. There are two rescue cages, each with a capacity of 14 passengers. The rescue cages have their own drive systems and can also be operated using a battery-powered console. During a breakdown, the cages can be attached to a set of rescue ropes on the tramway; the cages could then be brought up to the passengers, who can be evacuated through the windows of the cabins.

=== Structures and cabling ===
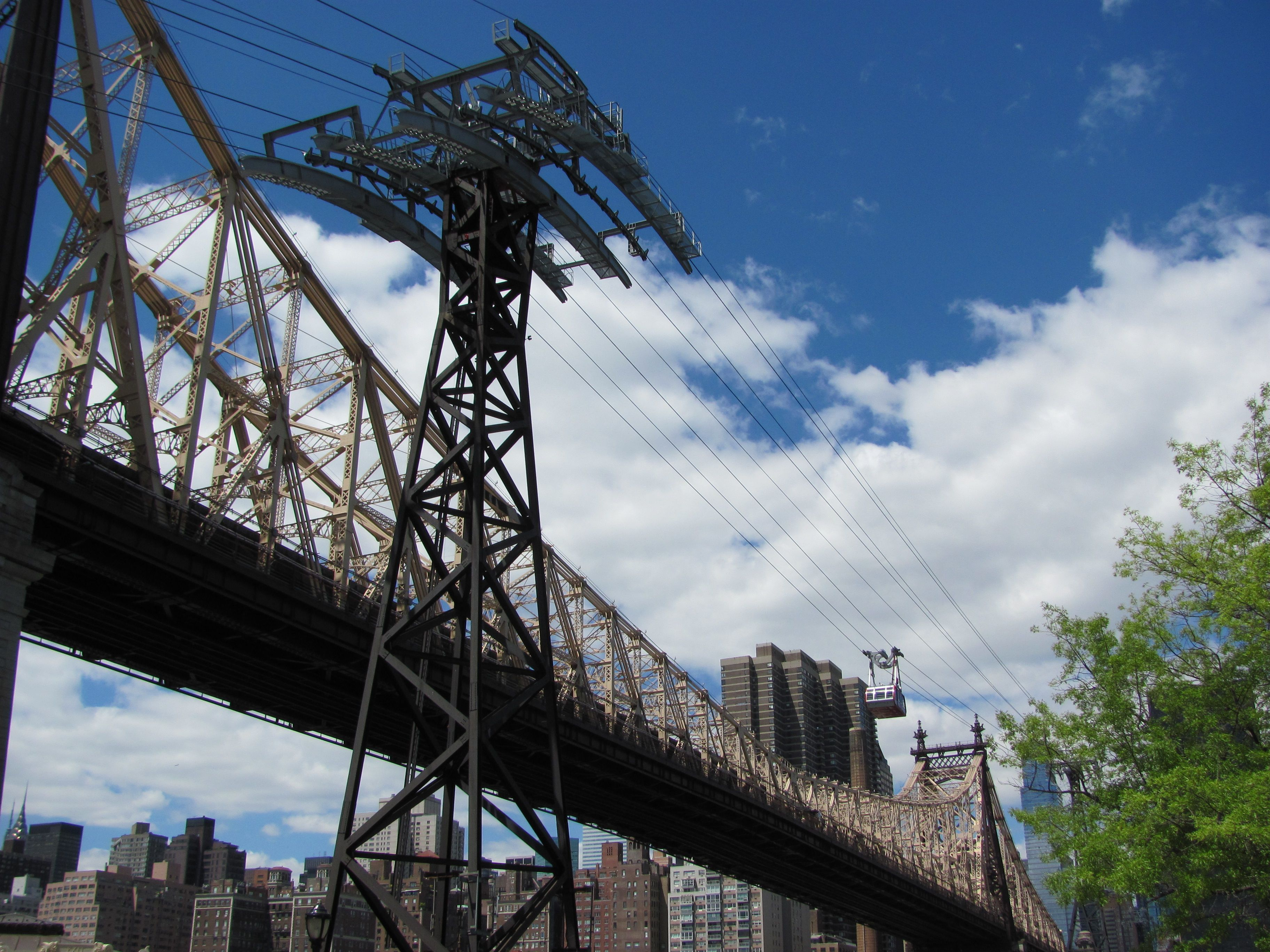
One of the support towers, which hold up the cables. The Queensboro Bridge and Manhattan skyline are visible in the background.

Originally, the cabins were suspended from their own pair of closely-spaced track ropes, and they were moved using a single haul cable. The haul cable was cited as measuring 1.625 inches (41.3 mm) thick, (Note: Another source gives a thickness of 1.75 inches (44 mm)) while the track cables were cited as measuring 1.8125 inches (46.0 mm) thick. The haul cable was laid in a continuous loop, moving the two cabins in opposite directions at the same time. As such, both cabins had to depart and arrive at the station at the same time; the cabins also operated during off-peak hours even if there was a lack of demand, and the entire route had to be taken out of service if one cabin broke down. The track ropes were attached to anchors at the Roosevelt Island terminal and tension weights at the Manhattan terminal. The anchors at the Roosevelt Island terminal were counterweights that descended 40 feet (12 m) into the ground.

Following the 2010 renovation, the Roosevelt Island Tramway was rebuilt as a dual haul system, allowing the cabins to be operated separately from each other. Each cabin is suspended from its own set of cables, which has a gauge of 14 feet (4.3 m). The cables can carry loads of up to 300,000 pounds (140,000 kg), more than three times the 80,000-pound (36,000 kg) weight of a fully loaded cabin. A third haul cable is used to pull each of the cabins.

Three support towers carry the cables. The original plans called for the cables to be supported on two towers along the south side of the Queensboro Bridge. The towers were moved to the north side of the bridge before construction began, and another tower was added. As built, the westernmost tower is between First and Second Avenues in Manhattan, the central tower is at York Avenue in Manhattan, and the easternmost tower is on Roosevelt Island. The towers are composed of steel posts that are welded together, and their foundations extend 40 feet (12 m) deep. The tallest tower, that at York Avenue, is 250 feet (76 m) above ground. The floors of the cabins are 135 feet (41 m) above the East River at their lowest point. When the system was built, a set of bars called "cabin entrance guides" was installed to prevent the cabins from hitting each station.

=== Drive system ===
When the tramway first opened, it was equipped with main drive, auxiliary drive, and rescue drive units. The haul cable was propelled by drive bullwheels at the Roosevelt Island terminal, which was operated by the main drive unit at the same location. The main drive unit had a motor that was cited as having either a 1,700 horsepower (1,300 kW) motor or a 2,000 horsepower (1,500 kW) motor. An overload circuit could turn off the main drive unit in an emergency. The Roosevelt Island terminal also had the rescue drive unit, which could pull a second haul cable in case of an emergency and could be activated within five minutes of a breakdown. At the Roosevelt Island terminal was a master console, which alerted controllers to issues and could override the consoles in each cabin. The auxiliary drive was a hydrostatic drive that ran on diesel.

The tramway's renovation involved replacing the main drive unit with an alternating current inverter system. Four backup generators were installed at each terminal behind the passenger waiting areas.

=== Operations ===
The tramway begins operating at 6:00 a.m. Eastern Time every day. The last trip is at 2:00 a.m. on weekdays and 3:30 a.m. on weekends. (Note: On Sunday through Thursday, service ends at 2 a.m. the following day; on Friday and Saturday, service ends at 3:30 a.m. the following day.) The route runs on 7.5-minute headways during rush hours and weekend mornings and 15-minute headways at all other times. The cabins can carry a maximum of 1,200 people an hour during peak times. The tramway generally makes about 115 trips per day. The rides typically last three to four minutes. The tram is wheelchair-accessible, and bicycles are permitted in cabins. Originally, the tramway could operate in most weather conditions, but it shut down if crosswinds exceeded either 40 miles per hour (64 km/h) or 45 miles per hour (72 km/h). Thunderstorms and lightning could also shut down the route. The modern tramway shuts down if crosswinds exceed 50 miles per hour (80 km/h) or if there is lightning.

The Roosevelt Island Tramway was the only aerial commuter tram in the U.S. until 2006, when the Portland Aerial Tram opened. A 2005 New York Times article described the tramway as one of fewer than two dozen aerial trams in the country, as most aerial trams in the U.S. served ski resorts. The Roosevelt Island Tramway and the Portland Aerial Tram remain the only two urban gondola lines nationwide as of 2024.

== Fares ==
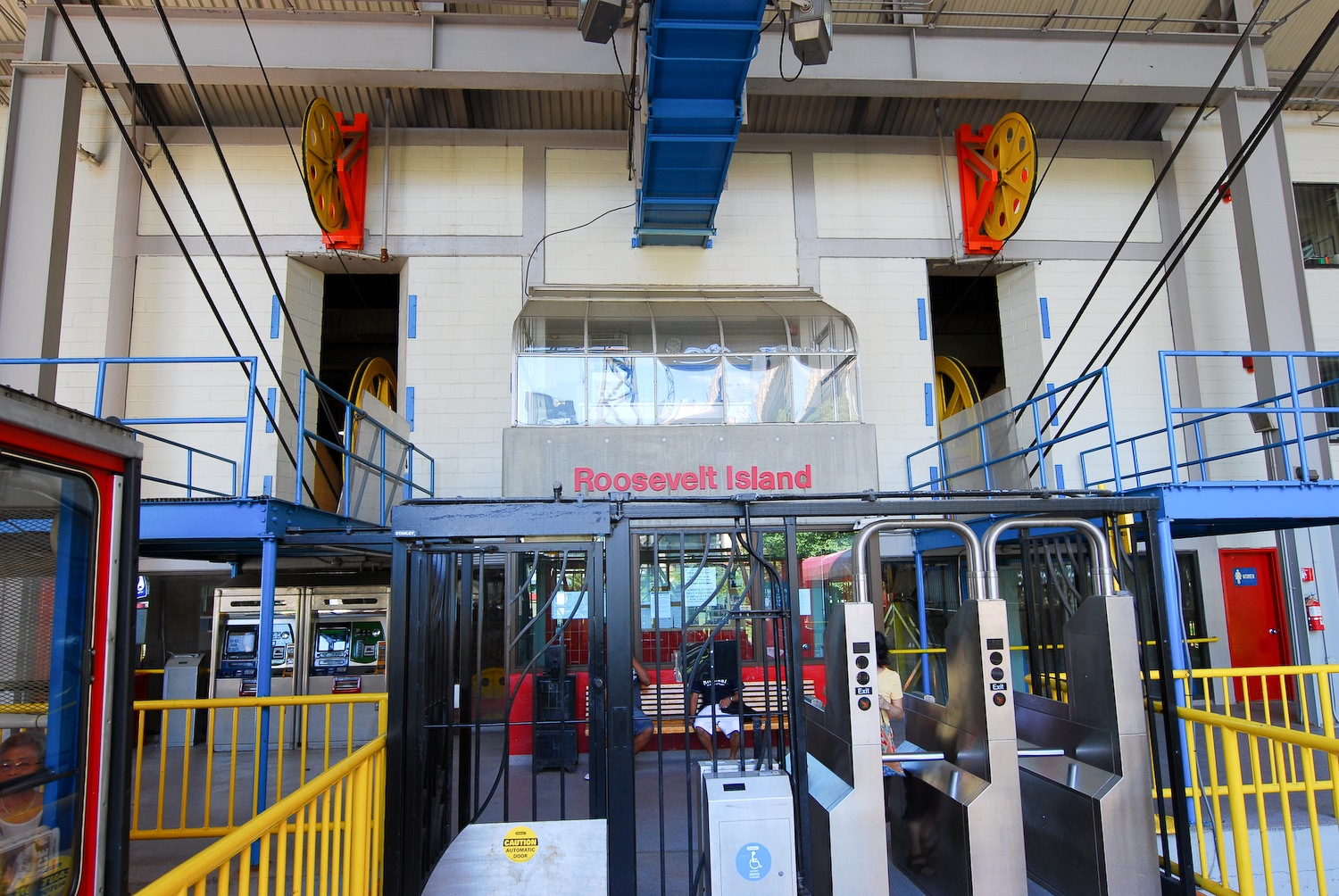
Turnstiles at the Roosevelt Island terminal

Originally, the city government received seven percent of all gross revenue from the tramway. During the mid-1980s, the fare was required to be the same as that on the subways and buses, and farebox revenue was used to fund operating costs. The RIOC's franchise agreement with the city mandated that, after the 63rd Street subway opened in 1989, the tramway fare be 25 cents higher than the subway fare. The franchise agreement expired in 1995.

Children who were 5 years old or younger were allowed to ride fare-free until the 2010 closure, when RIOC stopped charging fares based on age. Ever since the tramway reopened, children under 44 inches (1,100 mm) have been allowed to ride fare-free regardless of their age if they are accompanied by a paying adult.

The Roosevelt Island Tramway formerly issued its own fare token, with images of the Queensboro Bridge and a cabin on opposite sides. Standard New York City transit tokens were used on the Roosevelt Island Tramway until 2004, when MetroCard was implemented. OMNY has been accepted on the tram since August 2023. The fare using OMNY or pay-per-ride MetroCard is the same as that on the buses and subways, $3.00 for a one-way trip, as of 2026. Fares paid using OMNY are capped at $35 every seven days. Riders can transfer from the tram to buses and subway stations on either end for free, or vice versa, (Note: A free transfer is also provided in the reverse direction for bus and subway riders entering the tramway. However, only one free transfer is provided for each trip. For more information, see New York City transit fares § Transfers.) and tram riders can transfer to express buses for an extra fee.

== Ridership ==
After the tramway opened in 1976, it recorded 5,000 passengers on its first Sunday of operation and attracted 10,000 daily passengers in its first few weeks. The tramway carried its one-millionth rider in March 1977 and had seen 1.25 million riders, many of whom were weekend travelers, by its first anniversary. By 1989, just before the 63rd Street subway line began serving the island, the tramway saw 5,500 daily riders on average. Within a month of the subway's opening, the tram's weekly ridership declined from 35,000 to 20,000. Daily ridership on the tramway had decreased to 3,000 by 1993. The tramway carried about the same number of passengers daily in 1998, when the Roosevelt Island subway station had almost twice the ridership.

During the 2005 New York City transit strike, the tramway was one of the few public transportation modes in New York City that continued to operate, transporting three times its typical passenger count. Daily ridership averaged between 3,500 and 4,000 around that time. Just before the 2010s renovation began, the tramway had 2 million annual passengers. After the renovation was complete, daily ridership slightly increased to 6,000, and annual ridership was about 2.2 million. By 2016, the tramway accommodated 2.5 million annual passengers, while RIOC estimated that between 2.6 million and 2.7 million people rode the tramway every year. Poma estimated that 70 percent of daily riders were residents, while the remainder were tourists. The route saw 2,302,511 riders in the fiscal year ending on March 31, 2020; ridership numbers during the next two years decreased amid the COVID-19 pandemic. During the fiscal year ending on March 31, 2023, the tram recorded 2,146,128 riders, having recovered much of its pre-pandemic ridership.

== Impact ==
=== Critical reception ===
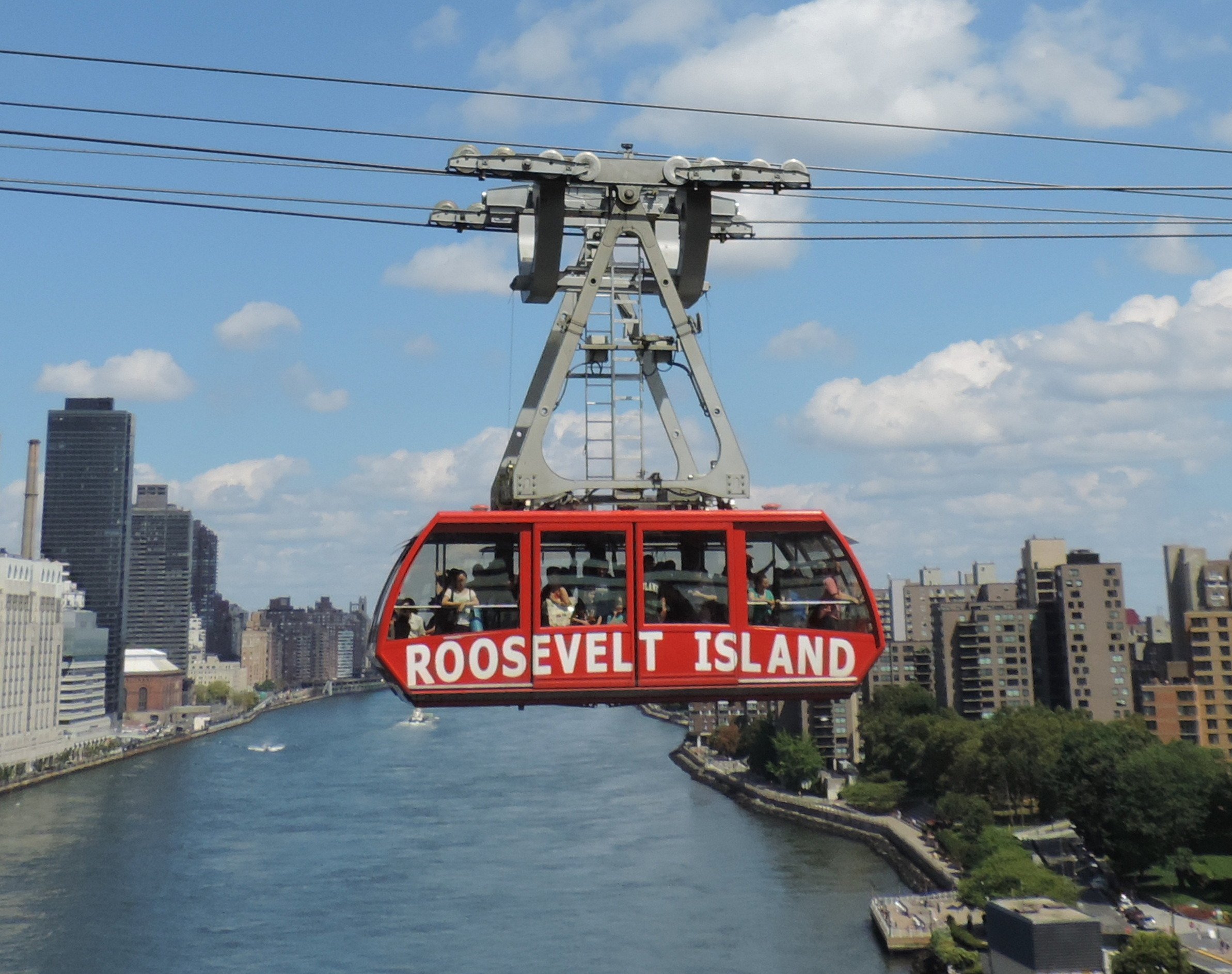
View of one tramway cabin from the Queensboro Bridge

The year before the tramway opened, Michael Winkleman wrote for New York magazine that the tramway was "a futuristic means of travel" to a "newfangled town" in the middle of the East River, at a time when the city was nearing bankruptcy. When the Roosevelt Island Tramway opened, The New York Times wrote that most Roosevelt Island residents saw the tramway positively, saying that "it has bridged their cherished moat without really destroying the insular peace and security" of the island. The Times described the tramway as a "cause for relief, if not rejoicing", for the island. The Guardian referred to the tramway as "Manhattan's touch of the Alps" but wrote that the tramway, as well as Roosevelt Island as a whole, was product of "too much public money [being] spent improving the lives of people who were comparatively well off". The architectural critic Paul Goldberger wrote in his book The City Observed that the ride resembled a Disneyland attraction but that "there is greater pleasure still in perceiving the reality: this is not Disneyland at all—it is New York".

The ride and stations were also the subject of commentary. A Newsday reporter wrote in 1976 that "there is a distinctly eerie feeling about silently gliding over traffic jams on Second Avenue". The same year, a writer for Time said that the cabin "began its stately ascent noiselessly and almost imperceptibly" and reached its destination in three and a half minutes. Robert A. M. Stern called the tramway's Manhattan station "a study in exaggerated contrasts".

By the mid-1980s, the tramway was so important to Roosevelt Island commuters, the New York Daily News wrote that "the future of this socially planned island is wound up with the fate of" the tram. A New York Times article said some tramway fans called it a New York City icon like the Staten Island Ferry and Brooklyn Bridge. A writer for Newsday wrote in 1989 that "it's as if all aboard have plunked down a subway token in exchange for a great island getaway vacation". Goldberger wrote in 1990, "one hopes [the tram cabins] will keep going forever, since this ride over the East River is one of the great experiences of New York." In 2003, a reporter for the Financial Times wrote that the tramway was a landmark in itself, where "tourists receive a perfect photo opportunity and voyeurs get a quick glance into several luxury apartments and palatial offices".

The New York Times wrote in 2006 that the tramway was not only a vital mode of transport for Roosevelt Island residents, particularly students and the elderly, but also "offers a rare chance to live purely in the moment in New York, no small achievement". The Times attributed the tram's popularity to its relative safety and comfort, its lack of overcrowding, and the views from the cabins. Over the years, the tram has carried notable riders such as actor Harrison Ford, tennis player Andre Agassi, and actor/filmmaker Sylvester Stallone. After the tramway was renovated, a writer for The Washington Post said that the line allowed a "pretty awesome" view of the skyline. A Curbed writer said in 2017 that, though the tramway's usefulness was limited by the fact that it traveled only between Manhattan and Roosevelt Island, this was counterbalanced by its "sheer awesomeness" and the fact that it was less crowded than the subway.

=== Influence and media ===
The construction of the Roosevelt Island Tramway inspired plans for several similar aerial tramways in New York City. These have included an architectural firm's 2013 proposal to extend the route at either end, as well as a 2014 proposal to build a set of parallel gondola lines across the East River from Brooklyn to Manhattan. Kongfrontation, an attraction at Universal Studios Florida that operated from 1990 to 2002, included a model of King Kong attacking a model of the Roosevelt Island Tramway.

The tramway has also been used as a filming location. The 1981 film Nighthawks was partially set on the tramway; many residents objected when the filming of a scene shut down the tram for a few days. Other films that have used the tramway as a setting include Léon: The Professional (1994), Sam Raimi's Spider-Man (2002) and Dark Water (2005), directed by Walter Salles, the latter of which was filmed on the route. In addition, the tramway is shown in the opening credits of the TV series Head of the Class and Archie Bunker's Place, during the Broadway musical The Tap Dance Kid, and a 2004 episode of Fear Factor.

== See also ==
- List of aerial tramways
- Lists of crossings of the East River
- Transportation in New York City
