= Roosevelt Island Bridge =

Bridge in New York City

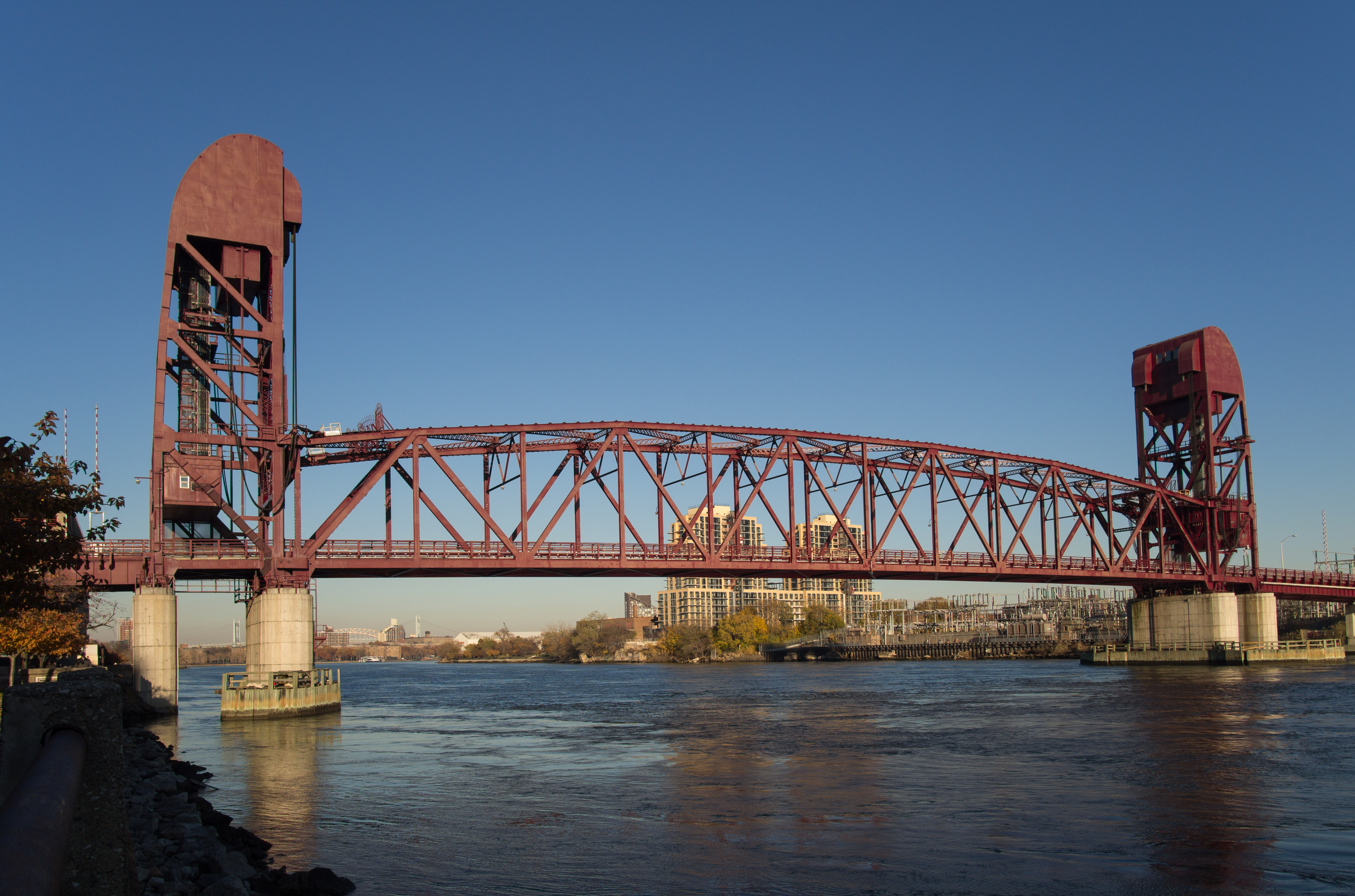
- Roosevelt Island Bridge as viewed from the south on Roosevelt Island
- Coordinates: 40°45′48″N 73°56′44″W
- Carries: 2 lanes of roadway; 1 sidewalk
- Crosses: East River (East Channel)
- Locale: Roosevelt Island and Queens, New York
- Maintained by: New York City Department of Transportation

Characteristics
- Design: Lift bridge
- Total length: 2,877 ft (877 m)
- Width: 40 ft (12 m)
- Longest span: 418 ft (127 m)
- Clearance below: 100 ft (30 m) when open

History
- Opened: May 18, 1955; 70 years ago

Statistics
- Daily traffic: 8,313 (2016)

The Roosevelt Island Bridge is a tower drive vertical lift bridge that connects Roosevelt Island in Manhattan to Astoria in Queens, crossing the East Channel of the East River. It is the sole route to the island for vehicular and foot traffic (without using public transportation).

The bridge has a sidewalk on the north side for foot traffic, and separate car and bike lanes in each direction. On the Roosevelt Island side, the sidewalk leads to the garage staircase, while the bike lanes merge into the car lanes and use the car ramp for island access. On the Queens side, the bike lanes marge into the Vernon Boulevard bike lanes.

== History ==
Construction of the bridge began on March 17, 1952, at a cost of $6.5 million. It opened on May 18, 1955, as the Welfare Island Bridge. The name was changed to the Roosevelt Island Bridge in 1973.

When the bridge is open it provides ships with 100 feet (30 m) of vertical clearance. It is 40 feet (12 m) wide, and its total length, including approaches, is 2,877 feet (877 m). The main span is 418 feet (127 m).

Before the bridge was constructed, the only way vehicles could access Roosevelt Island was via an elevator on the Queensboro Bridge. The elevator was subsequently demolished in 1970.

The Roosevelt Island Bridge provides direct access to the Motorgate Parking Garage, which was designed to minimize vehicular traffic on the island. The garage was completed in 1974 and later expanded in 1990.

In 2001, the New York City Department of Transportation considered converting the Roosevelt Island Bridge into a fixed bridge to reduce the cost of its maintenance. The bridge is rarely opened, because most vessels passing by Roosevelt Island use the West Channel of the East River. Most of the bridge openings occur in September during the General Assembly at the United Nations when the West Channel is closed for security reasons.

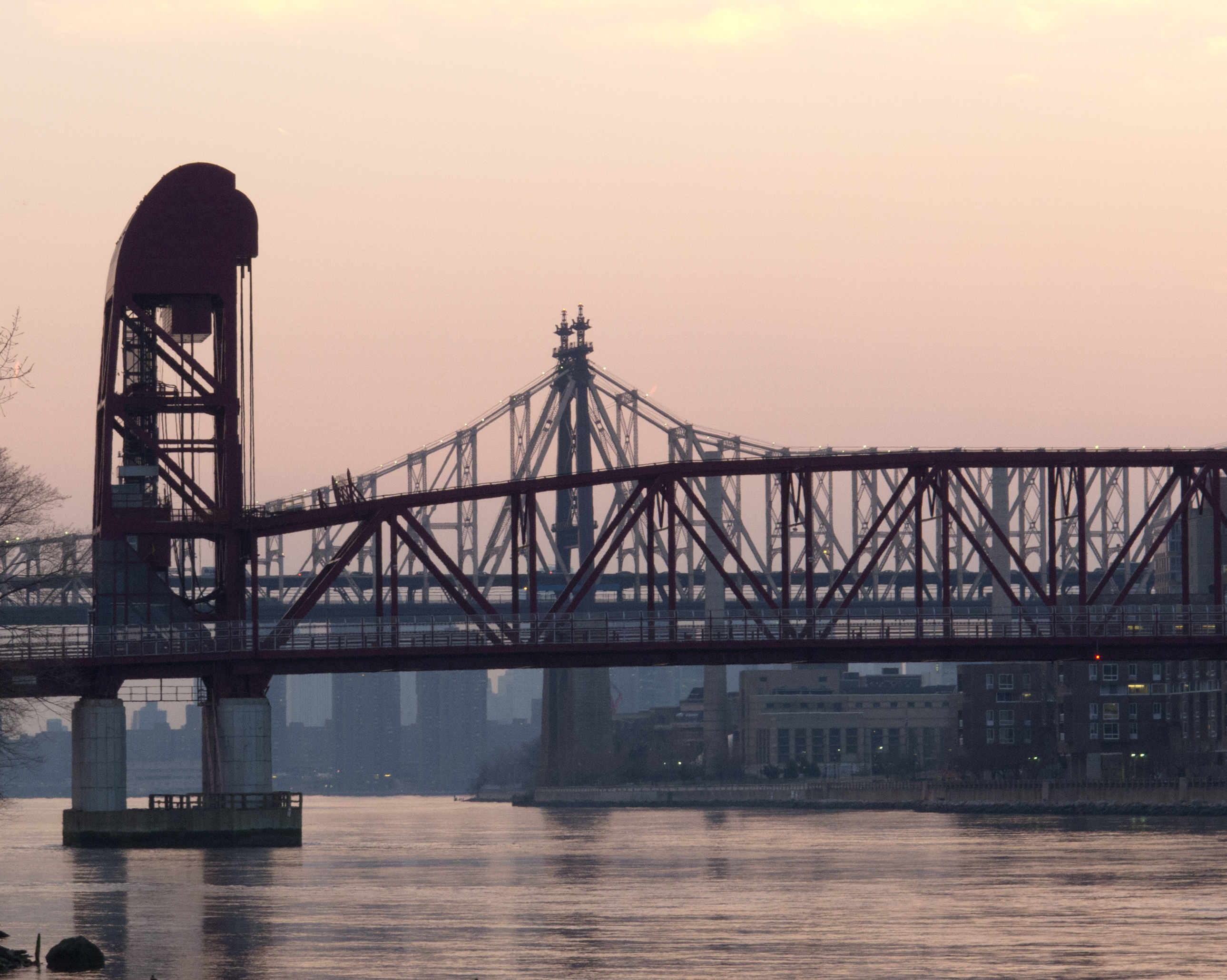
Queens side of Roosevelt Island Bridge, with the Queensboro Bridge in the background

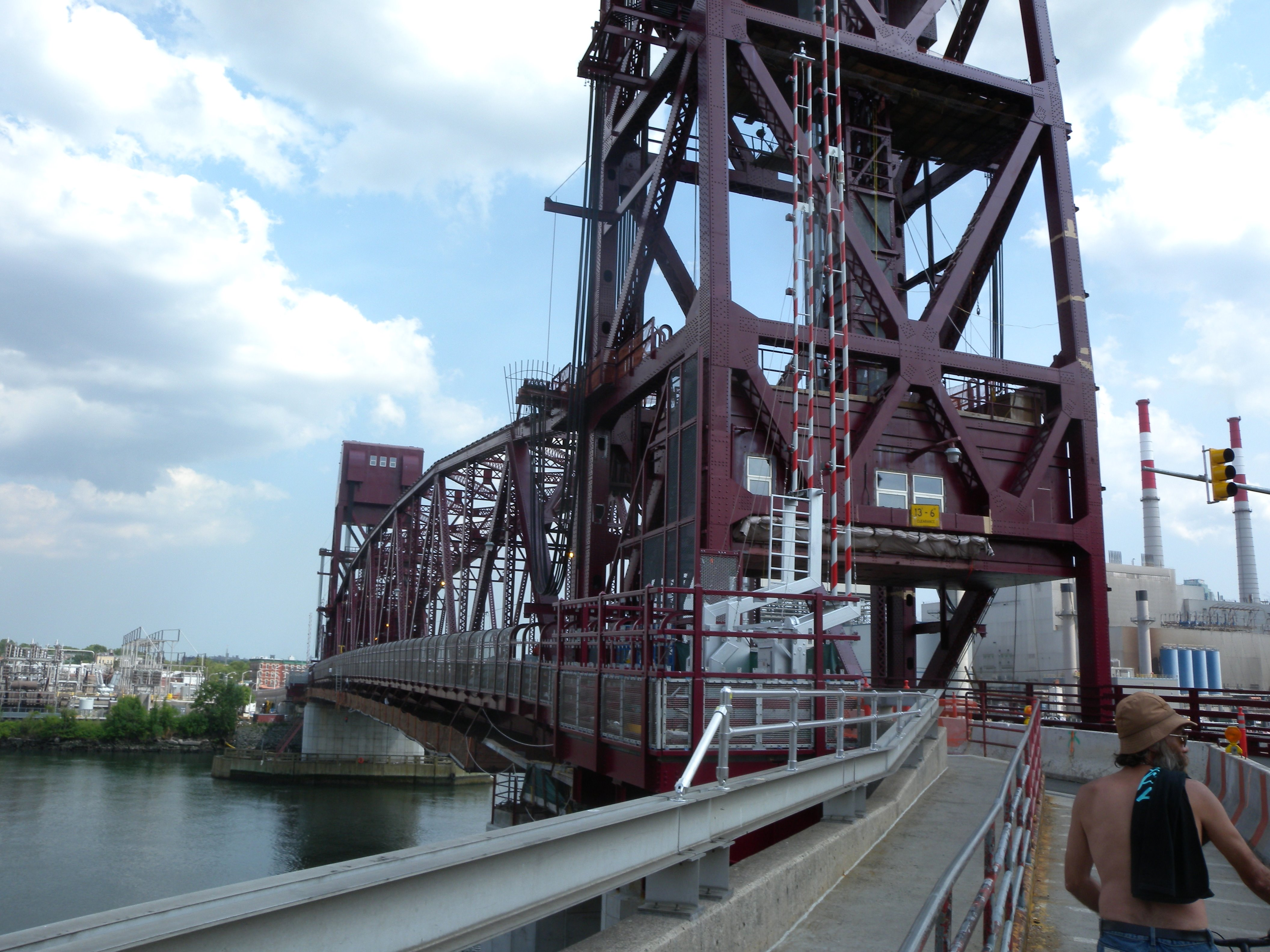
Western end of the bridge

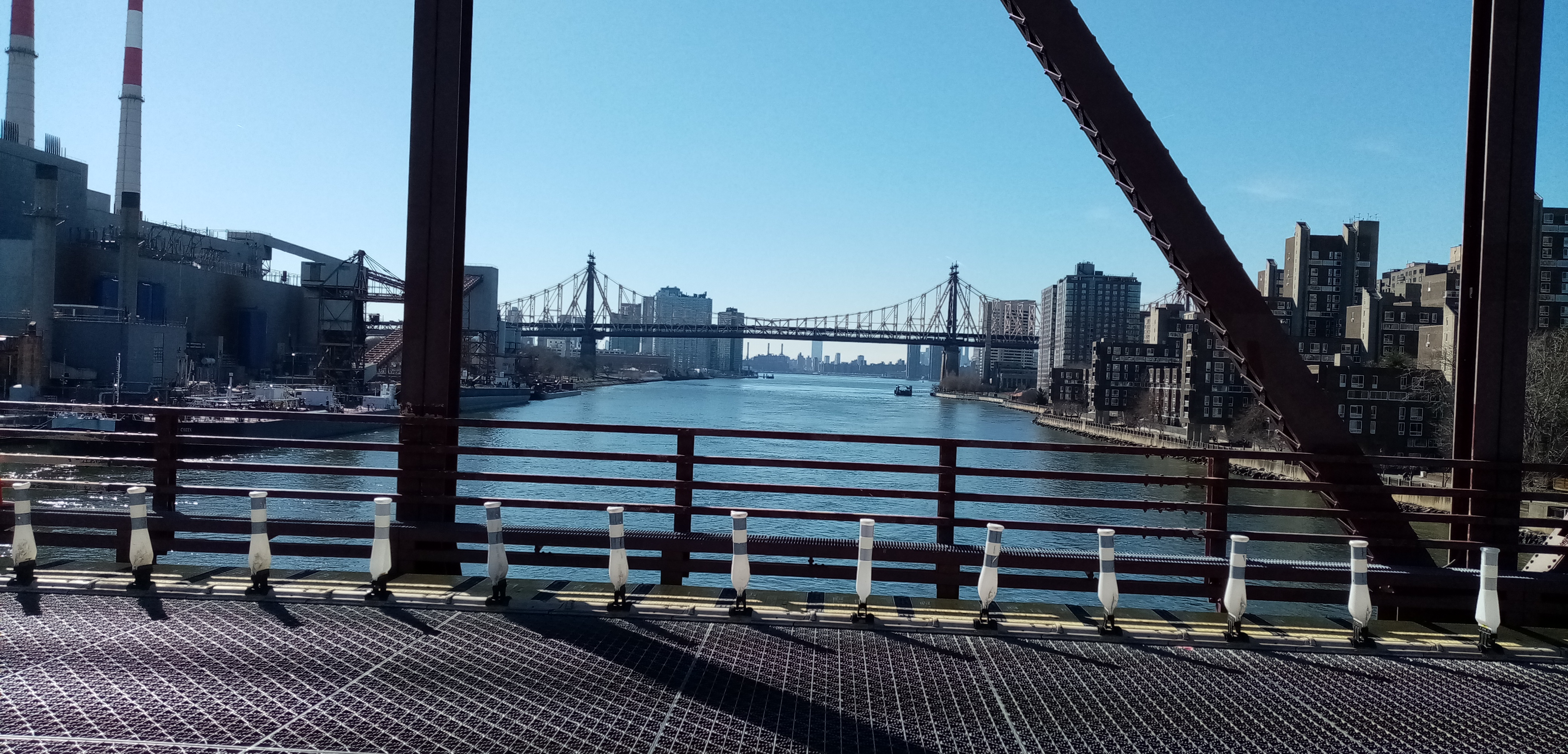
Southward view from the middle of the bridge

== See also ==
- Roosevelt Island Tramway
