= Woodhaven and Cross Bay Boulevards buses =

Bus routes in Queens, New York

q11 q52, q53
- Woodhaven and Cross Bay Boulevards line
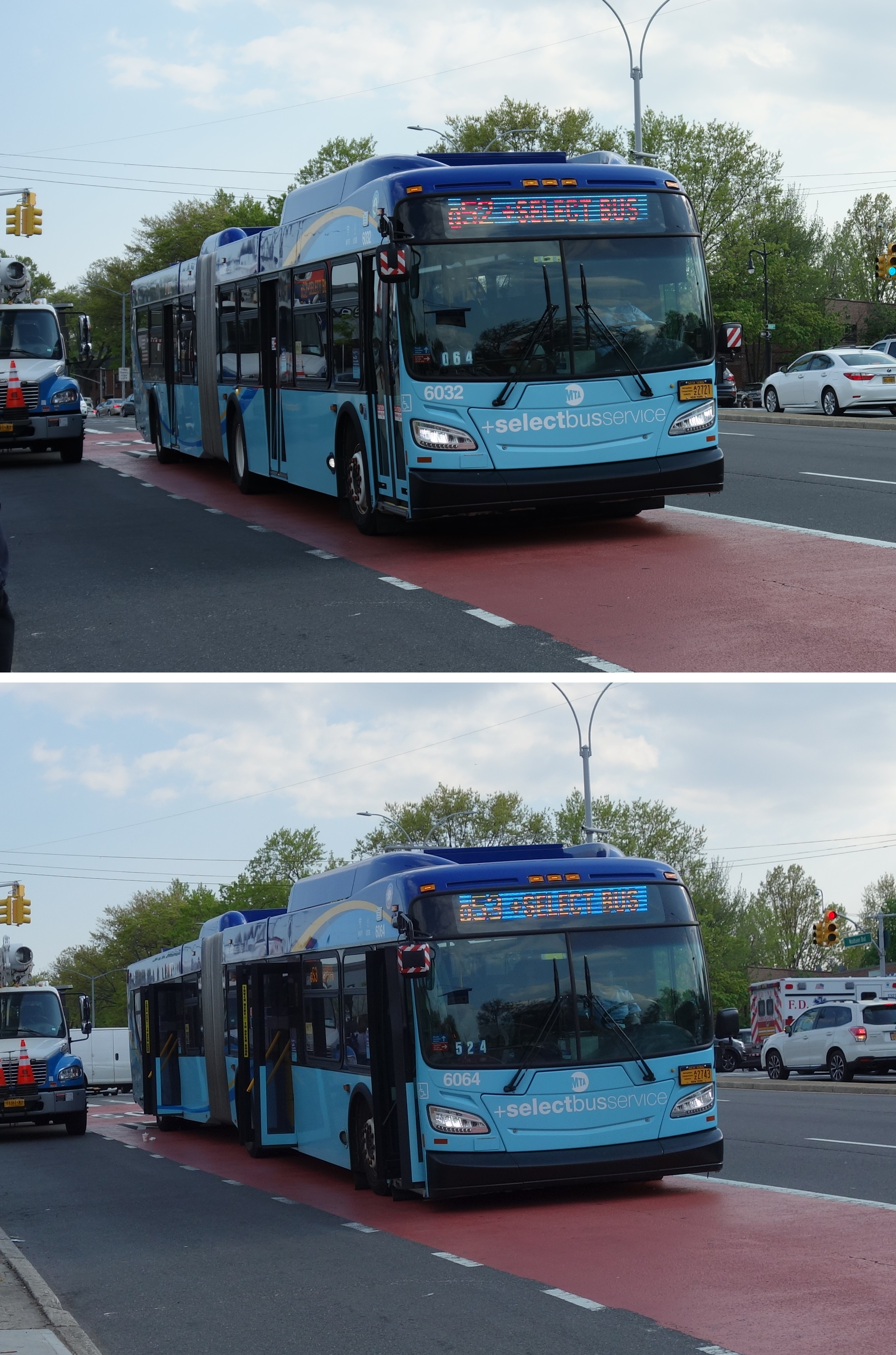
- Two 2017 XD60s (6032 & 6064) on the Q52 & Q53 SBS at Metropolitan Avenue

Overview
- System: MTA Regional Bus Operations
- Operator: MTA Bus Company
- Garage: Far Rockaway Depot (Q11); JFK Depot (Q52 SBS); LaGuardia Depot (Q53 SBS)
- Vehicle: Q11: Nova Bus LFS; New Flyer Xcelsior XD40; Q52/Q53 SBS: New Flyer Xcelsior XD60
- Livery: Select Q53 SBS buses only: Select Bus Service
- Began service: 1918 (Q11); 1923 (Q21); 1950 (Q53); 2012 (Q52); 2017 (Q52/Q53 SBS)
- Ended service: 2025 (Q21)

Route
- Locale: Queens, New York, U.S.
- Communities served: Woodside, Jackson Heights, Elmhurst, Rego Park, Forest Hills, Middle Village, Glendale, Woodhaven, Ozone Park, Howard Beach/Lindenwood, Broad Channel, Rockaway Beach/Hammels, Rockaway Park, Arverne, Edgemere
- Start: Q11, Q52: Elmhurst – Woodhaven Blvd/Queens Center Mall; Q53: Woodside – 61 St
- Via: Woodhaven and Cross Bay Boulevards
- End: Q11: Lindenwood – 157th Avenue or Old Howard Beach & Hamilton Beach; Q52: Edgemere – Beach 50th St; Q53: Rockaway Park – Beach 116 St
- Length: 14 miles (23 km) (Q53); 13.4 miles (21.6 km) (Q52); Q11 (Elmhurst to Howard Beach): 6.4 miles (10.3 km); Q11 (Elmhurst to Old Howard Beach/Hamilton Beach): 9.7 miles (15.6 km)
- Other routes: Q41 109th Avenue/Cross Bay Boulevard

Service
- Operates: 24 hours (Q11, Q53 SBS) (Note: Q52 operates all times except late nights)
- Annual patronage: Q11: 1,119,048 (2025); Q52 and Q53: 3,939,393 (2025)
- Transfers: Yes
- Timetable: Q11 Q52/Q53 SBS

The Q11, Q52, and Q53 bus routes constitute a public transit corridor running along Woodhaven and Cross Bay Boulevards in Queens, New York City. The corridor extends primarily along the length of the two boulevards through "mainland" Queens, a distance of 6 miles (9.7 km) between Elmhurst and the Jamaica Bay shore in Howard Beach. The Q52 and Q53 buses, which provide Select Bus Service along the corridor, continue south across Jamaica Bay to the Rockaway peninsula, one of the few public transit options between the peninsula and the rest of the city.

The Q11 on Woodhaven Boulevard, along with the now-discontinued Q21 on Cross Bay Boulevard, were formerly privately operated by Green Bus Lines, and the Q53 was formerly operated by Triboro Coach. All three routes were operated under subsidized franchises with the New York City Department of Transportation (NYCDOT). The Q11 and Q21 started service along the corridor in 1918 and 1923, respectively. These routes came under the control of Green Bus Lines in the 1930s when the borough's bus system was divided into four lettered "zones", with "Zone C" including Woodhaven, Richmond Hill, Ozone Park, Howard Beach, and the Rockaways operated by Green Lines. An additional route along the corridor, the Q53, was added in 1950, to replace the Long Island Rail Road's Rockaway Beach Branch service to the Rockaways, which was shut down due to a trestle fire. This service was operated by Triboro Coach.

In 2006, all three routes had their operations taken over by the MTA Bus Company brand of MTA Regional Bus Operations. The Q53 originally was a premium fare service, with a long nonstop segment from Rego Park to Broad Channel, as it was a replacement service for rail. Soon after the MTA's takeover of the route, it was converted to be a limited-stop service, with six stops along the corridor. The Q21, which originally served only Cross Bay Boulevard and ran between Rockaway Boulevard and the Rockaways, was subsequently extended up Woodhaven Boulevard, and its southern terminus in the Rockaways was switched. Increased ridership resulted in the creation of the Q21 Limited; this was soon replaced by the Q52 Limited, which replaced Q21 service south of Howard Beach.

Since 2008, the Woodhaven-Cross Bay corridor has undergone studies for Select Bus Service (SBS) implementation, which has converted the Q52 and Q53 into bus rapid transit routes. However, the project was delayed by controversy over proposed changes to the corridor, including left-turn bans and the proposed installation of bus lanes in the corridor's median. The first phase of the project began service on November 12, 2017. As part of the Queens bus redesign, on August 31, 2025, the Q21 was discontinued and replaced by the Q11 in Lindenwood.

== Route description ==
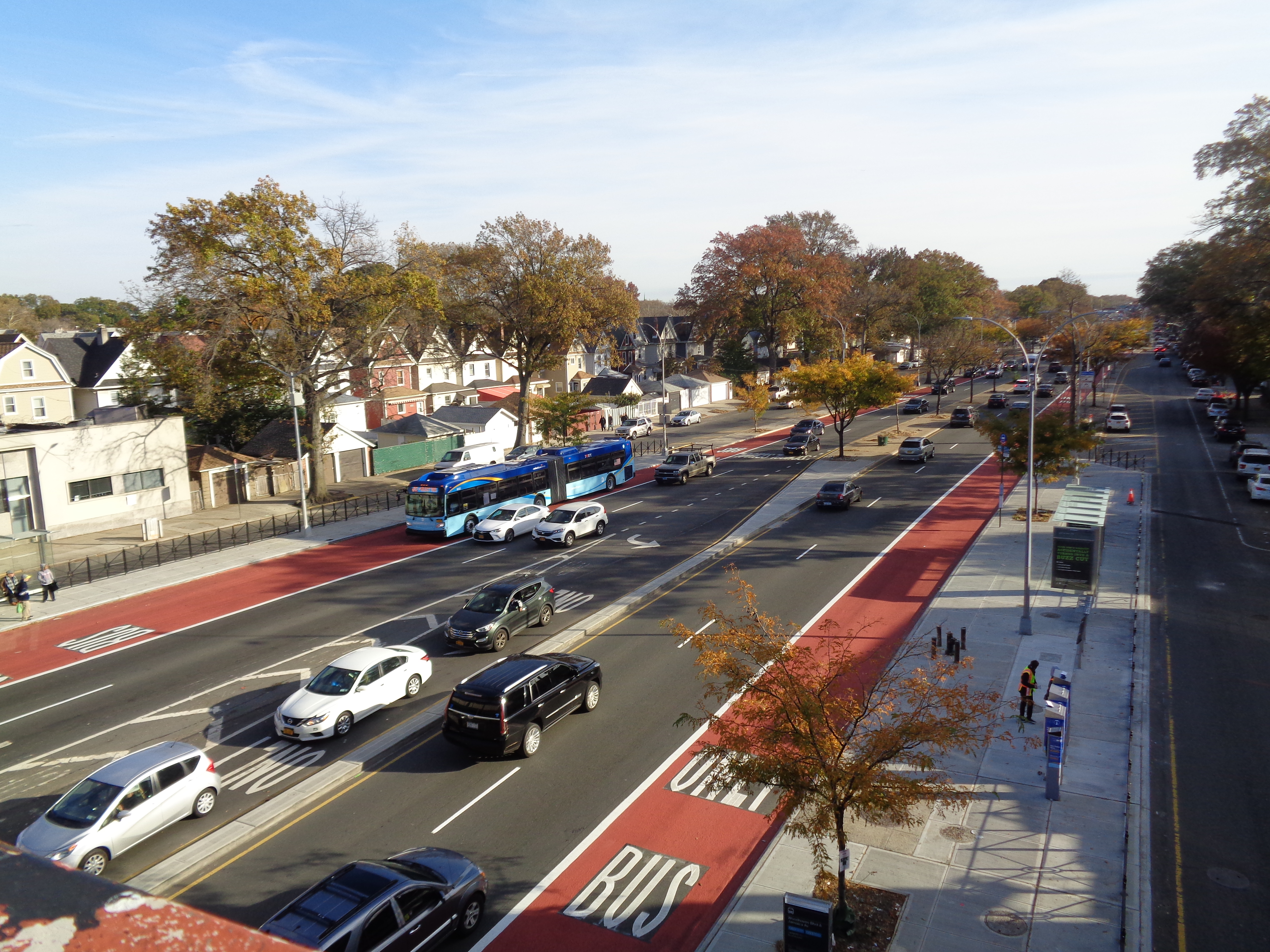
Looking south down Woodhaven Boulevard near Jamaica Avenue, with a 2017 XD60 on the Q52 SBS (left), and new bus lanes and median bus stops used for Select Bus Service

The Q11, Q52, and Q53 all share a route along most of Woodhaven and Cross Bay Boulevards, between Queens Boulevard in Elmhurst and Pitkin Avenue in Ozone Park. The Q11 provides local service, while the Q52 and Q53 provide limited-stop service and extend into the Rockaways, an isolated peninsula in the south-west of Long Island which is popular as a summer retreat. The Q11 and now-discontinued Q21 originally corresponded to the northern (Woodhaven) and southern (Cross Bay) portions of the Boulevard respectively, while the Q53 originally made no stops along the corridor. The corridor parallels the former Rockaway Beach Branch of the Long Island Rail Road, whose northern half remains inactive and whose southern half was reactivated for rapid transit service as the IND Rockaway Line of the New York City Subway. Service on the line to the Rockaways across Jamaica Bay was halted due to the 1950 fire on the Jamaica Bay trestle, and the LIRR sold the line to New York City due to its bankruptcy. The LIRR maintained service on the northern half of the line until 1962 while the NYCTA began operating subway service on the southern half in 1956.

Except for the Q53, all buses along the corridor end northbound service at Queens and Woodhaven Boulevards, at the Woodhaven Boulevard subway station of the IND Queens Boulevard Line and at the foot of Queens Center mall. Buses reenter service in a dedicated bus stop area on Hoffman Drive adjacent to the south side of Queens Boulevard. The Q53 serves these stops on its through service to or from Woodside.

=== Q11 ===
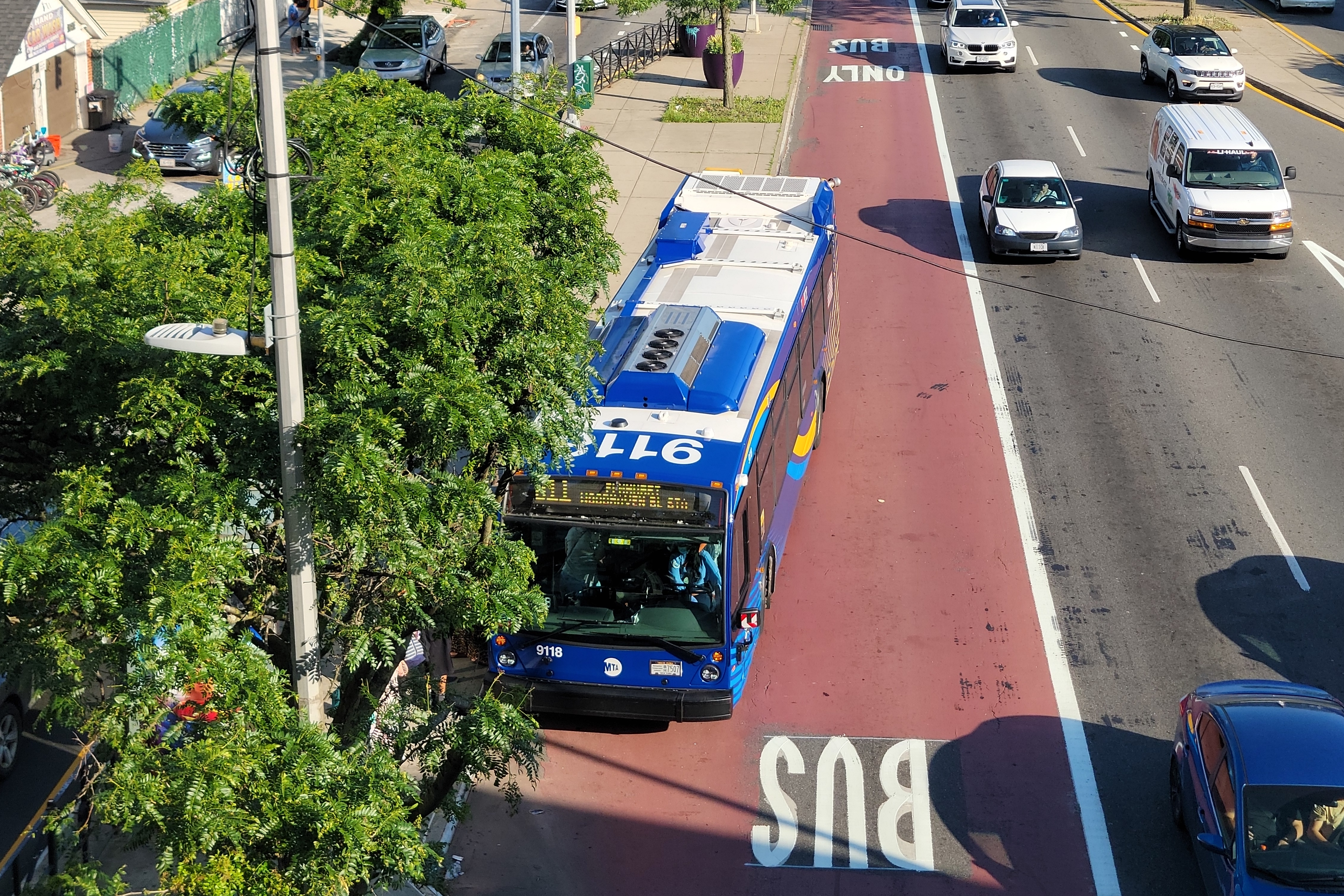
A station view of a 2023 LFS (9118) on the Elmhurst-bound Q11 at Woodhaven Blvd/Jamaica Avenue in June 2025

The Q11 begins at Queens Boulevard, and runs down the entire length of Woodhaven Boulevard and a short portion of Cross Bay Boulevard to Pitkin Avenue. South of Pitkin Avenue, the Q11 turns west, running on several local streets to provide service to the neighborhood of Lindenwood. Some buses terminate at Cross Bay Boulevard and Pitkin Avenue, while others continue via 157th Avenue to serve Old Howard Beach and Hamilton Beach (two neighborhoods separated by Hawtree Creek) in one trip.

The original Q11 route served both Old Howard Beach and Hamilton Beach as a single branch. After running to 165th Avenue in Old Howard Beach, it crossed a bridge over Hawtree Creek, which has since been removed, then ran north in Hamilton Beach to 102nd Street and Russell Street.

Prior to the Queens bus redesign in 2025, the southernmost part of the route turned east at Pitkin Avenue, then south along several local streets through the eastern portion of Howard Beach, running near Aqueduct Racetrack and the Howard Beach–JFK Airport station of the subway and AirTrain JFK. At 160th Avenue, the route split into two branches; a western branch to Old Howard Beach and an eastern branch to Hamilton Beach. Both terminated near the southern coast of their respective neighborhoods at 165th Avenue. Select weekday rush hour trips and all late night service short-turned at Pitkin Avenue, via Redding Street. Prior to 2010, 24-hour service had been provided to Old Howard Beach and Hamilton Beach.

Starting September 4, 2025, on weekday afternoons during the school year, select Q11 buses operate "school tripper" service from Rockaway Park. These trips begin at Beach 104th Street at the Scholars' Academy (I.S. 323) and across from Beach Channel Educational Campus, and operate along the former Q21 route through the Rockaways and Broad Channel. Three buses depart at 3pm, followed by one more at 3:45, all going to Elmhurst. This service was provided by the Q52 until it was converted into Select Bus Service in 2017 (see below). This school tripper service was also offered on the Q21 until its discontinuation in 2025.

The Q11 also serves J.H.S. 202 Robert H. Goddard and M.S. 210 Elizabeth Blackwell during the school year, with all trips going to Elmhurst. The former trips have three buses depart at 1:50 followed by another three at 2:30-2:32, heading to Cross Bay Boulevard via 149th Avenue. The latter trips have three more buses all depart at 2:30, heading to Woodhaven Boulevard via 94th Street and 101st Avenue.

=== Q52 SBS ===
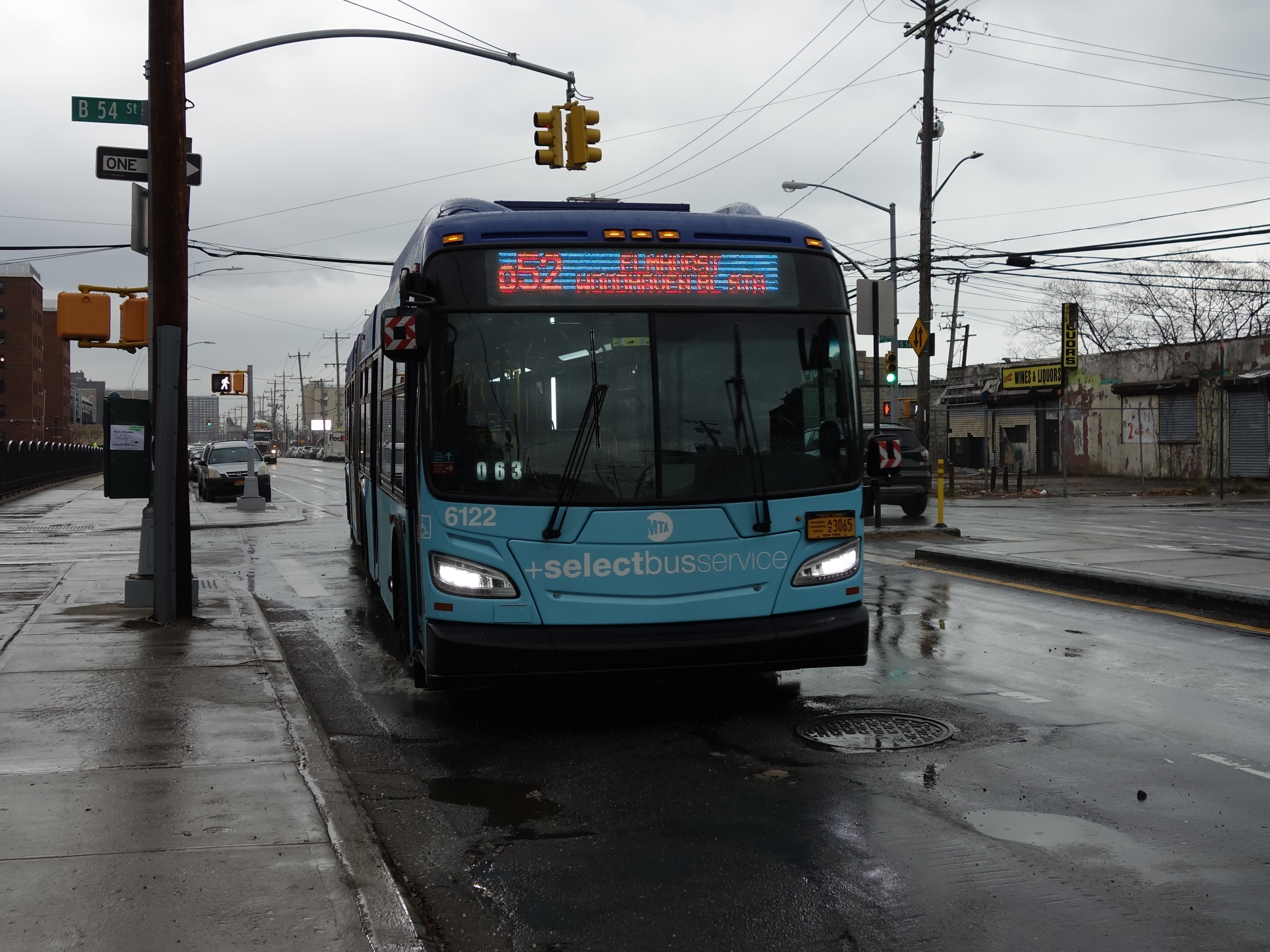
A 2017 New Flyer XD60 (6122) on the Elmhurst-bound Q52 SBS just leaving Beach 54th Street in December 2018

The Q52 was created in July 2012 to replace the former Q21 Limited service (refer to § Q21). It begins at Queens Boulevard and runs down the entire length of Woodhaven and Cross Bay Boulevards through "mainland" Queens, making limited stops. It then crosses the Joseph P. Addabbo Memorial Bridge onto the island of Broad Channel within the Jamaica Bay Wildlife Refuge, where it makes several stops. It then crosses the Cross Bay Veterans Memorial Bridge onto the Rockaway peninsula in the neighborhood of Hammels, where it turns east onto Rockaway Beach Boulevard. The Q52 continues down the boulevard, turning left on Beach 62nd Street, right on Arverne Boulevard, and left on Beach 54th Street, terminating at Beach Channel Drive in Edgemere. Elmhurst-bound buses originating from that stop would use Beach Channel Drive before turning left on Beach 59th Street, right on Rockaway Beach Boulevard, and via its normal route through Woodhaven and Cross Bay Boulevards. Prior to April 2017, southbound Q52s terminated at Beach 69th Street in Arverne, reentering service two blocks east at the Beach 67th Street subway station.

This route, along with the Q53, was converted to a Select Bus Service route on November 12, 2017. The route makes fewer stops than the limited-stop service, uses articulated buses, and travels on the corridor's bus lanes for a large section of its route, speeding travel times. As part of the conversion, it has been proposed to extend the Q52 east to Far Rockaway, along a similar route to the former Q21A. On August 31, 2025, the Q52 was extended slightly east to Beach 51st Street. The first northbound stop, at Beach 51st Street, does not have fare machines like the other stops do, and as such can be utilized only by riders who pay using OMNY card or contactless device.

=== Q53 SBS ===
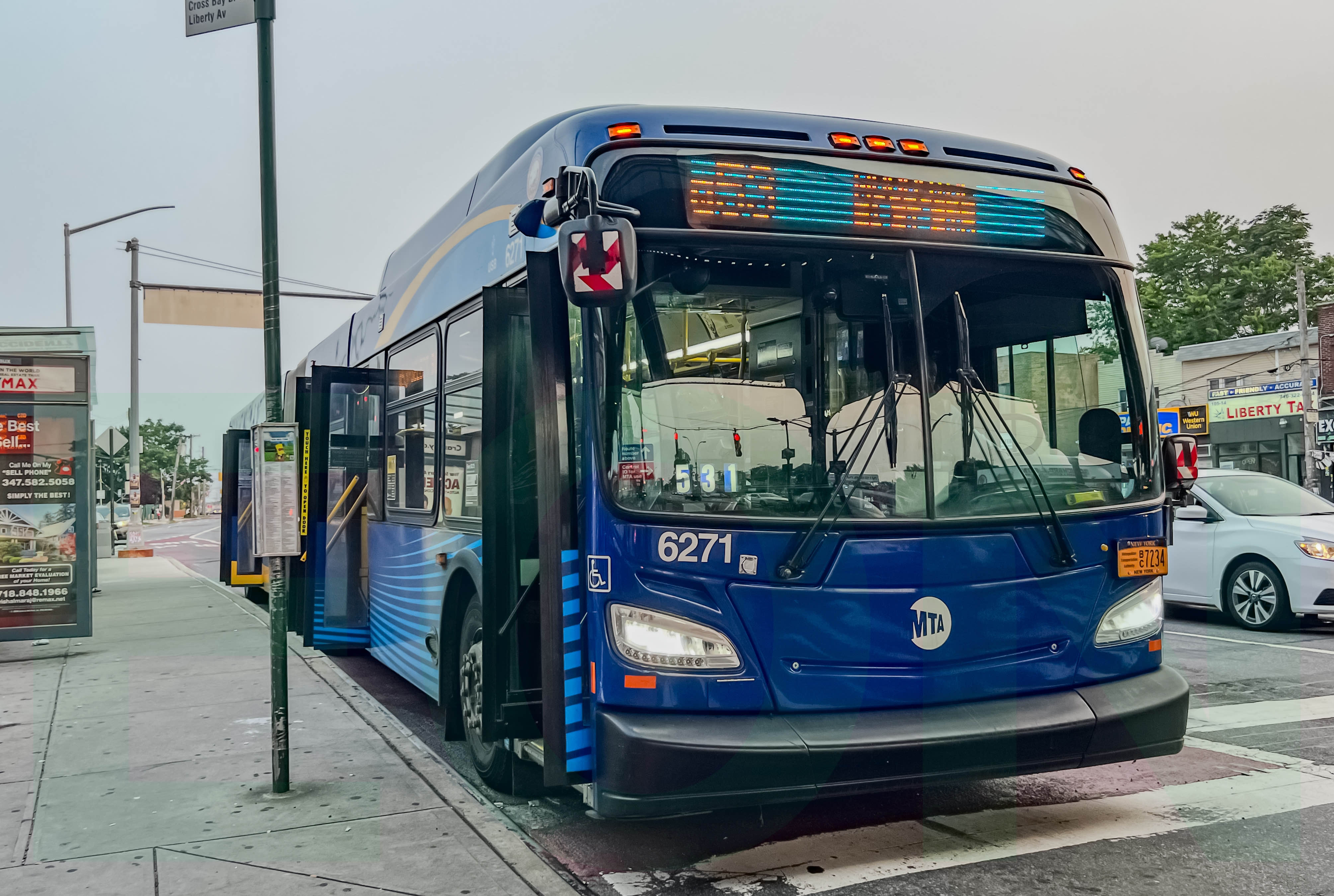
A 2020 XD60 (6271) on the Woodside-bound Q53 SBS in July 2023

The Q53 SBS is the longest of the three routes, running 14 miles (23 km). It begins in Woodside, at the 61st Street subway station of the IRT Flushing Line and the Woodside LIRR station. The route then runs east along Roosevelt Avenue and Broadway, before joining the other three routes at Woodhaven Boulevard and Queens Boulevard and following the Q52's Select Bus Service-stop service pattern through mainland Queens and Broad Channel. After crossing Jamaica Bay and entering the Rockaway peninsula, the Q53 turns west on Rockaway Beach Boulevard and terminates at the Beach 116th Street subway station of the IND Rockaway Line in Rockaway Park.

Created as a replacement for Rockaway Beach Branch service in the 1950s, the Q53 was originally labeled an express service. It made stops at the Woodside LIRR station, Roosevelt Avenue/74th Street subway station, Grand Avenue station, and 63rd Drive subway station (near the former Rego Park LIRR station) before running non-stop to Broad Channel and the Rockaways. Under the MTA, limited-stop service along Woodhaven and Cross Bay Boulevard was added in 2006, with service in Elmhurst added in 2009, and overnight service was added in 2013.

The Q53, originally being operated by Triboro Coach operated from the LaGuardia Depot in East Elmhurst. Under takeover by the MTA, it was transferred to College Point Depot, a former Queens Surface Corporation facility on January 5, 2014, due to construction at the LaGuardia Depot. It returned to LaGuardia Depot, on January 8, 2017, in exchange for the Q23.

==== Select Bus Service stops ====
Station Street traveled	Direction	Connections
Q53 only
61st Street Roosevelt Avenue	Northbound Terminus; Southbound Station	LIRR: City Terminal Zone, Port Washington Branch at Woodside; MTA Bus: Q18, Q32, Q70 SBS to LaGuardia Airport; NYC Subway: trains at 61st Street–Woodside
75th Street Broadway	Bidirectional	MTA Bus: Q32, Q33, Q47, Q49, Q70 SBS; NYC Subway: trains at Roosevelt Avenue/74th Street
78th Street Broadway	Southbound	
Baxter Avenue Broadway	Northbound	
Whitney Avenue Broadway	Bidirectional	NYC Subway: trains at Elmhurst Avenue
Justice Avenue Broadway	Northbound	NYC Bus: Q58, Q59, Q98; MTA Bus: Q60; NYC Subway: trains at Grand Avenue–Newtown
Queens Boulevard Broadway	Southbound	NYC Bus: Q58, Q59, Q98; MTA Bus: Q60; NYC Subway: trains at Grand Avenue–Newtown
Q52 and Q53
Woodhaven Boulevard / Queens Center Queens Boulevard	Q52 Northbound Terminus; Q53 Northbound	NYCT Bus: Q14, Q29, Q59, Q88, Q98; MTA Bus: Q11, Q60, QM10, QM11, QM12, QM40, QM42; NYC Subway: trains at Woodhaven Boulevard
Woodhaven Boulevard Hoffman Drive	Q52 Southbound Station; Q53 Southbound	NYCT Bus: Q14, Q29, Q59, Q88, Q98; MTA Bus: Q11, Q60, QM10, QM11, QM12, QM40, QM42; NYC Subway: trains at Woodhaven Boulevard
Penelope Avenue Woodhaven Boulevard	Southbound	NYCT Bus: Q38; MTA Bus: Q11, BM5, QM15
63rd Drive Woodhaven Boulevard	Northbound	NYCT Bus: Q38; MTA Bus: Q11, BM5, QM15
Metropolitan Avenue Woodhaven Boulevard	Bidirectional	MTA Bus: Q11, Q23, QM12, QM15, QM42; NYC Bus: Q54
Myrtle Avenue Woodhaven Boulevard	Bidirectional	MTA Bus: Q11, BM5, QM15; NYC Bus: Q55
Jamaica Avenue Woodhaven Boulevard	Bidirectional	MTA Bus: Q11, QM15; NYC Bus: Q56; NYC Subway: trains at Woodhaven Boulevard
91st Avenue Woodhaven Boulevard	Bidirectional	MTA Bus: Q11; NYC Bus: Q24 (at Atlantic Avenue)
101st Avenue Woodhaven Boulevard	Bidirectional	MTA Bus: Q8, Q11, QM15
Rockaway Boulevard Woodhaven Boulevard	Southbound	MTA Bus: Q7, Q11, Q41, Q51, Q112, QM15; NYC Subway: train at Rockaway Boulevard
Liberty Avenue Cross Bay Boulevard	Northbound	MTA Bus: Q7, Q11, Q41, Q51, Q112, QM15; NYC Subway: train at Rockaway Boulevard
Pitkin Avenue Cross Bay Boulevard	Bidirectional	MTA Bus: Q11, Q41, BM5, QM15
157th Avenue Cross Bay Boulevard	Bidirectional	MTA Bus: Q41, QM15, QM16, QM17
163rd Avenue Cross Bay Boulevard	Bidirectional	MTA Bus: Q41, QM15, QM16, QM17 (southbound only)
Joseph P. Addabbo Memorial Bridge
Broad Channel
Jamaica Bay Wildlife Refuge Cross Bay Boulevard	Bidirectional	
Noel Road Cross Bay Boulevard	Bidirectional	MTA Bus: QM15, QM16, QM17; NYC Subway: trains at Broad Channel
East 16th Road Cross Bay Boulevard	Northbound	
West 17th Road Cross Bay Boulevard	Southbound	
Cross Bay Veterans Memorial Bridge
Rockaway Peninsula
Q52 only
Beach 92nd Street Rockaway Beach Boulevard	Southbound	MTA Bus: Q22, QM15, QM17; NYC Subway: trains at Beach 90th Street
Beach 91st Street Rockaway Beach Boulevard	Northbound	MTA Bus: Q22, QM15, QM17; NYC Subway: trains at Beach 90th Street
Beach 84th Street Rockaway Beach Boulevard	Bidirectional	MTA Bus: Q22, QM15, QM17
Beach 74th Street Rockaway Beach Boulevard	Southbound	MTA Bus: Q22, QM15, QM17
Beach 73rd Street Rockaway Beach Boulevard	Northbound	MTA Bus: Q22, QM15, QM17
Beach 67th Street Rockaway Beach Boulevard	Bidirectional	NYC Subway: train at Beach 67th Street
Beach 59th Street Arverne Boulevard	Southbound	NYC Subway: train at Beach 60th Street
Rockaway Beach Boulevard Beach 59th Street	Northbound	NYC Subway: train at Beach 60th Street
Beach Channel Drive Beach 54th Street	Southbound	MTA Bus: Q22, QM15, QM17
Beach 54th Street Beach Channel Drive	Northbound	MTA Bus: Q22, QM15, QM17
Beach Channel Drive Beach 51st Street	Southbound Terminus	MTA Bus: Q22, QM15, QM17
Beach 51st Street Beach Channel Drive	Northbound Station	MTA Bus: Q22, QM15, QM17
Q53 only
Beach 96th Street Rockaway Beach Boulevard	Bidirectional	MTA Bus: Q22, QM16; NYC Subway: trains at Beach 98th Street
Beach 102nd Street Rockaway Beach Boulevard	Bidirectional	MTA Bus: Q22, QM16
Beach 108th Street Rockaway Beach Boulevard	Bidirectional	MTA Bus: Q22, QM16
Rockaway Beach Boulevard Beach 116th Street	Southbound Terminus; Northbound Station	MTA Bus: Q22, Q35, QM16 (at Newport Avenue); NYC Subway: trains at Rockaway Park–Beach 116th Street

=== Express bus service ===
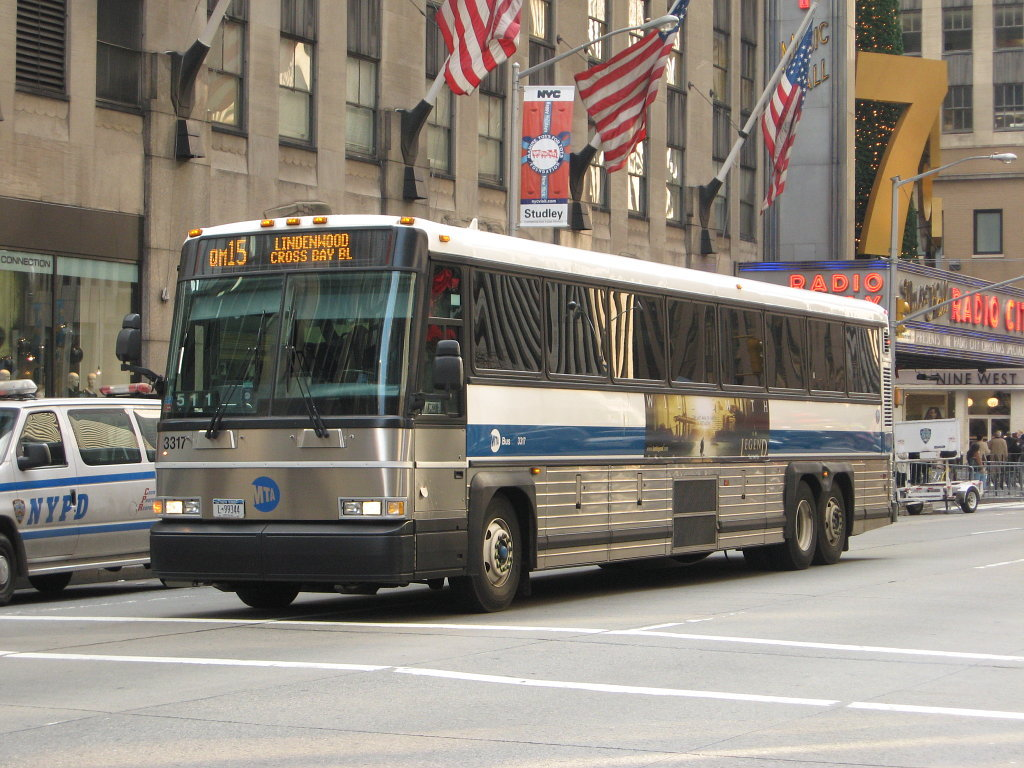
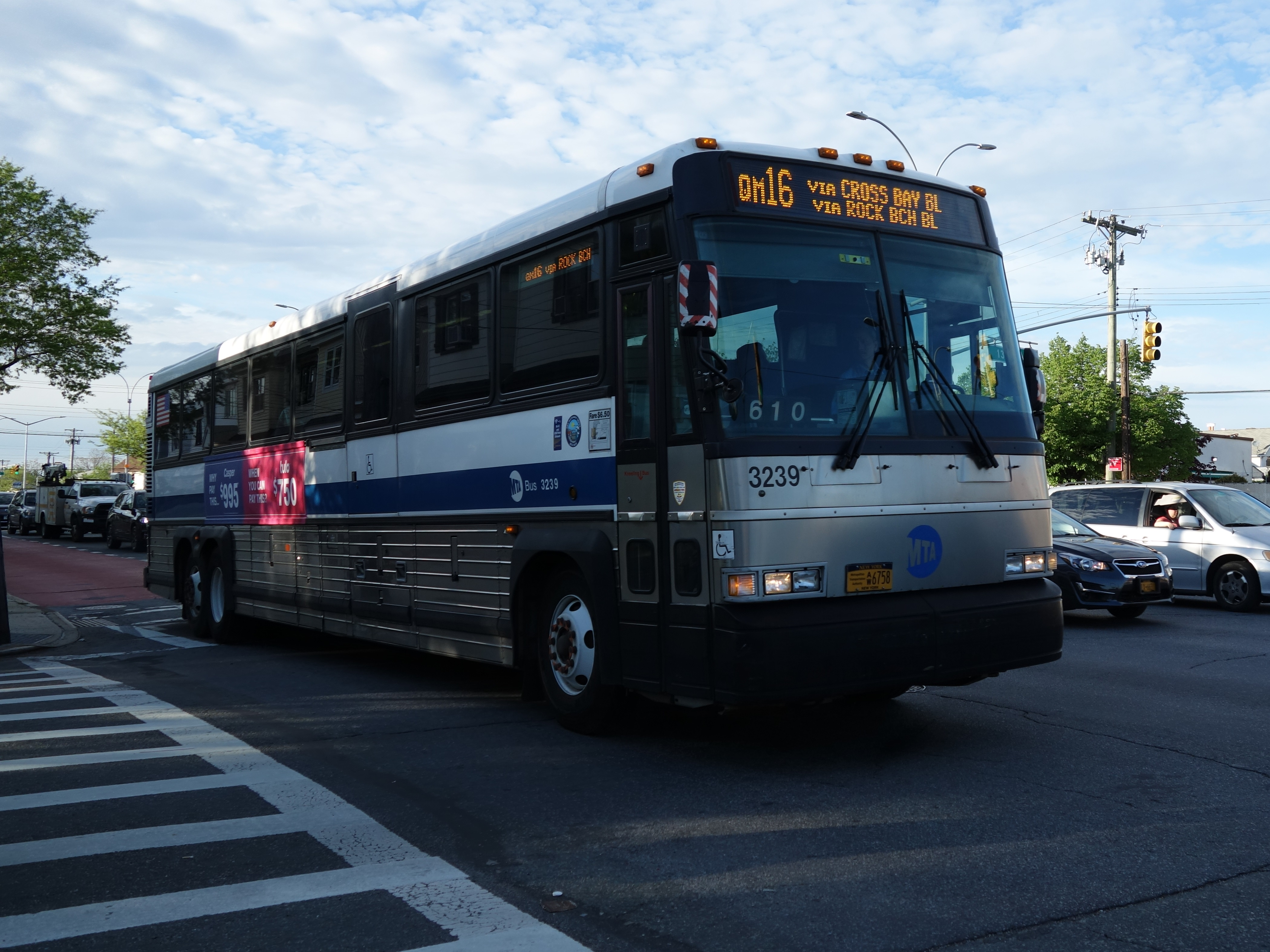
Two Motor Coach D4500CLs: one 2007 (3317) on the Lindenwood-bound QM15 in Midtown, and one 2006 (3239) on the Neponsit-bound QM16 at Cross Bay Boulevard/133rd Avenue

In addition to local and limited-stop service, four bus routes (QM15, QM16, QM17, BM5) provide express bus service to Manhattan via the Woodhaven and Cross Bay corridor. The QM16 and QM17 provide service to the Rockaway Peninsula and Broad Channel, beginning in Neponsit (west) and Far Rockaway (east) respectively. They then make stops along Cross Bay Boulevard into Howard Beach, before running non-stop to Manhattan north of the Belt Parkway. The QM15 has multiple start points, Cross Bay Boulevard and 157th Avenue, Eastern Howard Beach near Aqueduct Racetrack, or Beach Channel Drive and Beach 54 Street in Arverne, and runs the Lindenwood route of the Q21 before making stops along the rest of the corridor. The BM5, which originates in Starrett City, Brooklyn, also serves the corridor north of Conduit Avenue, but does not make any stops north of 63rd Drive. All four routes proceed onto the Long Island Expressway at the interchange near Queens Boulevard in Elmhurst. All routes were formerly operated by Green Bus Lines, except the BM5, which was operated by Command Bus Company.

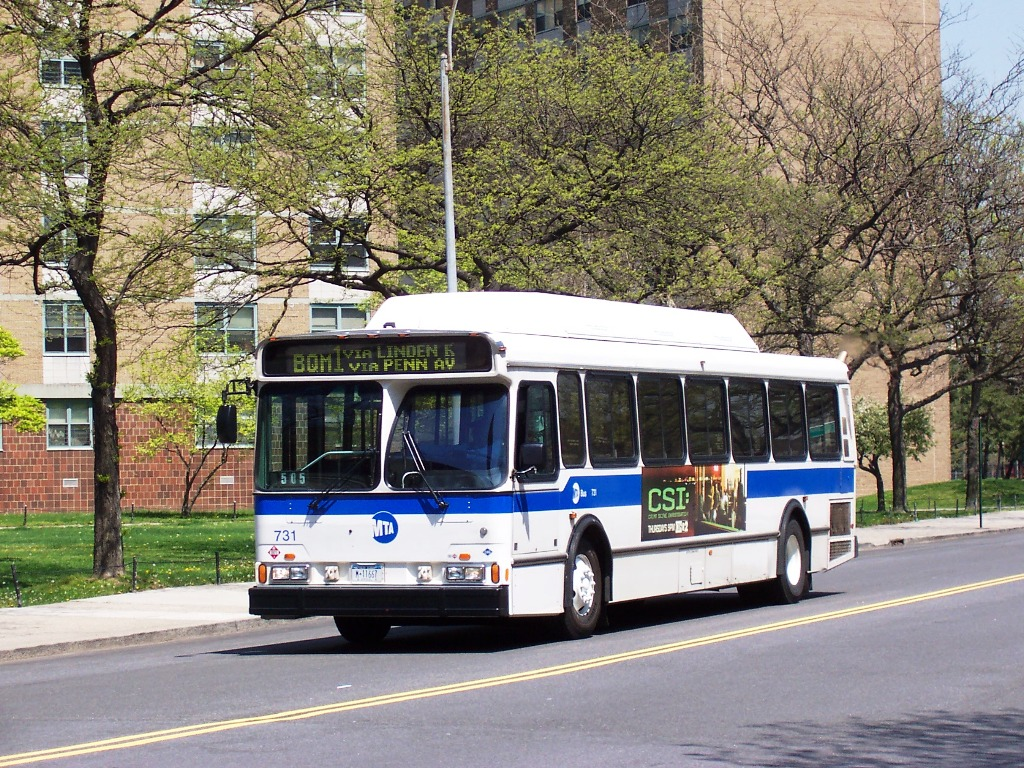
A 1998 Orion V CNG (731) on the former Starrett City-bound BQM1

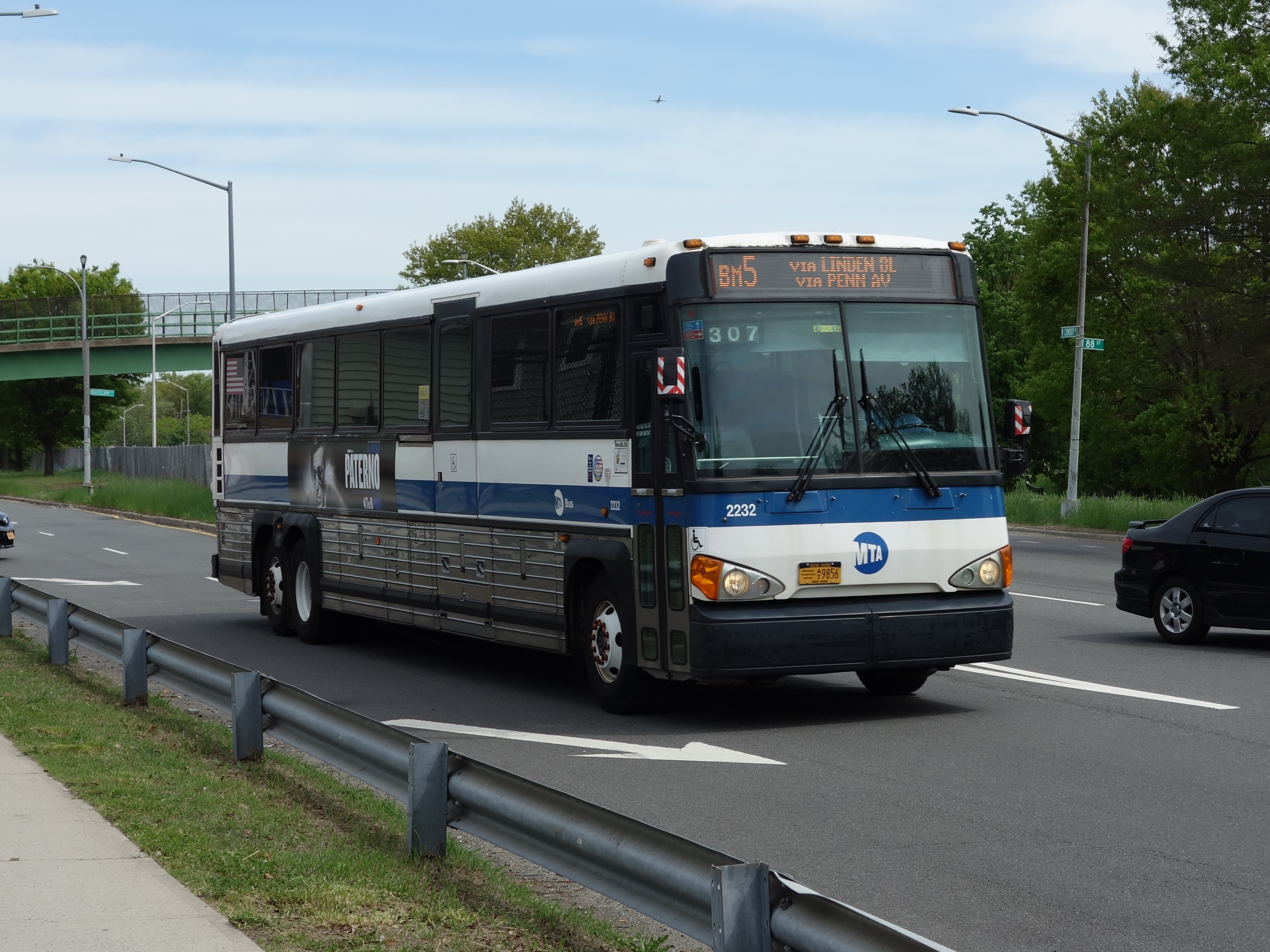
A 2008 Motor Coach D4500CT (2232) on the current Starrett City-bound BM5 at North Conduit Avenue/88th Street

=== Other bus routes ===
The following also run on parts of the corridor:

- The Q41 runs via Cross Bay Boulevard and Lindenwood between 164th Avenue and Rockaway Boulevard. It then proceeds east on Rockaway Boulevard and several local streets towards the 168th Street Bus Terminal in Downtown Jamaica, which is the terminus for many routes formerly operated by Green Bus Lines, also known as Green Lines.
- The Q29 and Q14 run on the boulevard to Queens Center Mall (northbound), or from Hoffman Drive (southbound). The Q29 heads to Dry Harbor Road, while the Q14 heads to Eliot Avenue.
- The Q112 runs between Sutter Avenue and either Liberty Avenue (Jamaica) or 94th Street (East New York).
- East Elmhurst-bound Q23 buses run non-stop from Union Turnpike to Metropolitan Avenue, then the Midtown-bound QM12 and QM42 express buses take over until Yellowstone Boulevard, also running on the short part of Woodhaven Boulevard between the Long Island Expressway and either Horace Harding Expressway (Forest Hills) or Queens Boulevard (Midtown).
  - The QM10, QM40 also run this part, but use Hoffman Drive to enter the LIE. The QM11 also gets onto the LIE from Hoffman, but runs all the way to 59th Avenue to serve more of LeFrak City.
- The QM24, QM25 and QM34 run between the LIE and Eliot Avenue.

=== Former bus routes ===
==== Q21 ====
The Q21 began at Queens Boulevard, and provided local service along the entire length of Woodhaven and Cross Bay Boulevards in "mainland" Queens. Between Conduit Avenue (Elmhurst) or 153rd Avenue (Howard Beach) and 157th Avenue near the Belt Parkway, the Q21 turned west and ran on several local streets to provide service to the neighborhood of Lindenwood; the routing is labeled as "via Lindenwood". The route terminated near the Jamaica Bay shore at 164th Avenue in Howard Beach. For service to Elmhurst, it headed west on the avenue until 84th Street, then north to 160th Avenue, and east back to the boulevard. The Q21 ran less frequently than the Q11, and did not operate overnight. Before being transferred from Green Bus Lines to the MTA Bus Company (MTA), the Q21's northern terminus was at Liberty Avenue, and the route provided service between "mainland" Queens and the Rockaways via the Q53 routing, terminating at the Flight 587 memorial at the Rockaway Beach Boardwalk. In 2008, the route was extended north along Woodhaven Boulevard. In January 2012, the Q21 was rerouted to Arverne and a limited-stop branch was added. This limited-stop service became the Q52 in July 2012, and the Q21 was subsequently truncated to Howard Beach. On weekday afternoons during the school year, select Q21 buses operated "school tripper" service from Rockaway Park. These trips began at Beach 104th Street at the Scholars' Academy (I.S. 323) and across from Beach Channel Educational Campus, and operated along the former Q21 route through the Rockaways and Broad Channel. This service was provided by the Q52 until it was converted into Select Bus Service in 2017 (see Woodhaven and Cross Bay Boulevards buses § Q52 SBS). Under the 2025 bus redesign, this route was eliminated due to the Q11's reroute in Lindenwood, and the Q11 took over the Rockaway Park school trippers.

The Q21 previously had an additional branch called the Q21A, which provided service between Brooklyn and the Rockaways. This route began at the New Lots Avenue subway station in the New Lots subsection of East New York, Brooklyn. It ran east along Linden Boulevard, then south along Cross Bay Boulevard to the Rockaways. Unlike the Q21, the Q21A traveled east to Far Rockaway at the Mott Avenue subway station, a total distance of 13 miles (21 km). The route initially used Beach Channel Drive east of the Cross Bay Bridge, later using Rockaway Beach Boulevard/Edgemere Avenue (adjacent to the Rockaway Freeway).

A second branch, the Q21B, ran from New Lots Avenue non-stop to Beach 98th Street at the Rockaways' Playland amusement park. It then made stops in Rockaway Park and Neponsit before terminating at the beaches of Jacob Riis Park on the western portion of the peninsula. This route only operated during the summer months of 1936.

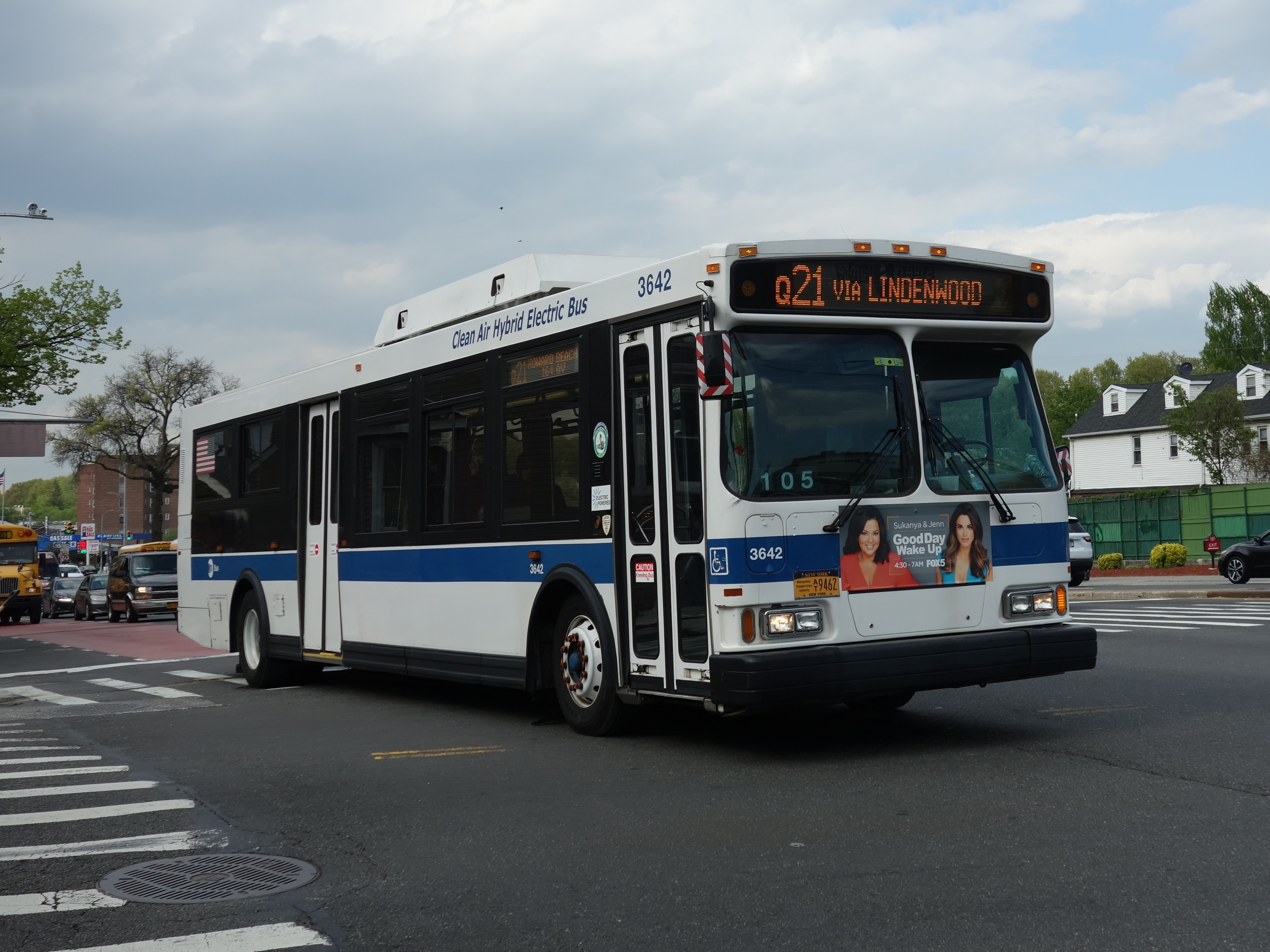
A 2007 Orion VII OG HEV (3642) on the Howard Beach-bound Q21 bus crossing Metropolitan Avenue.

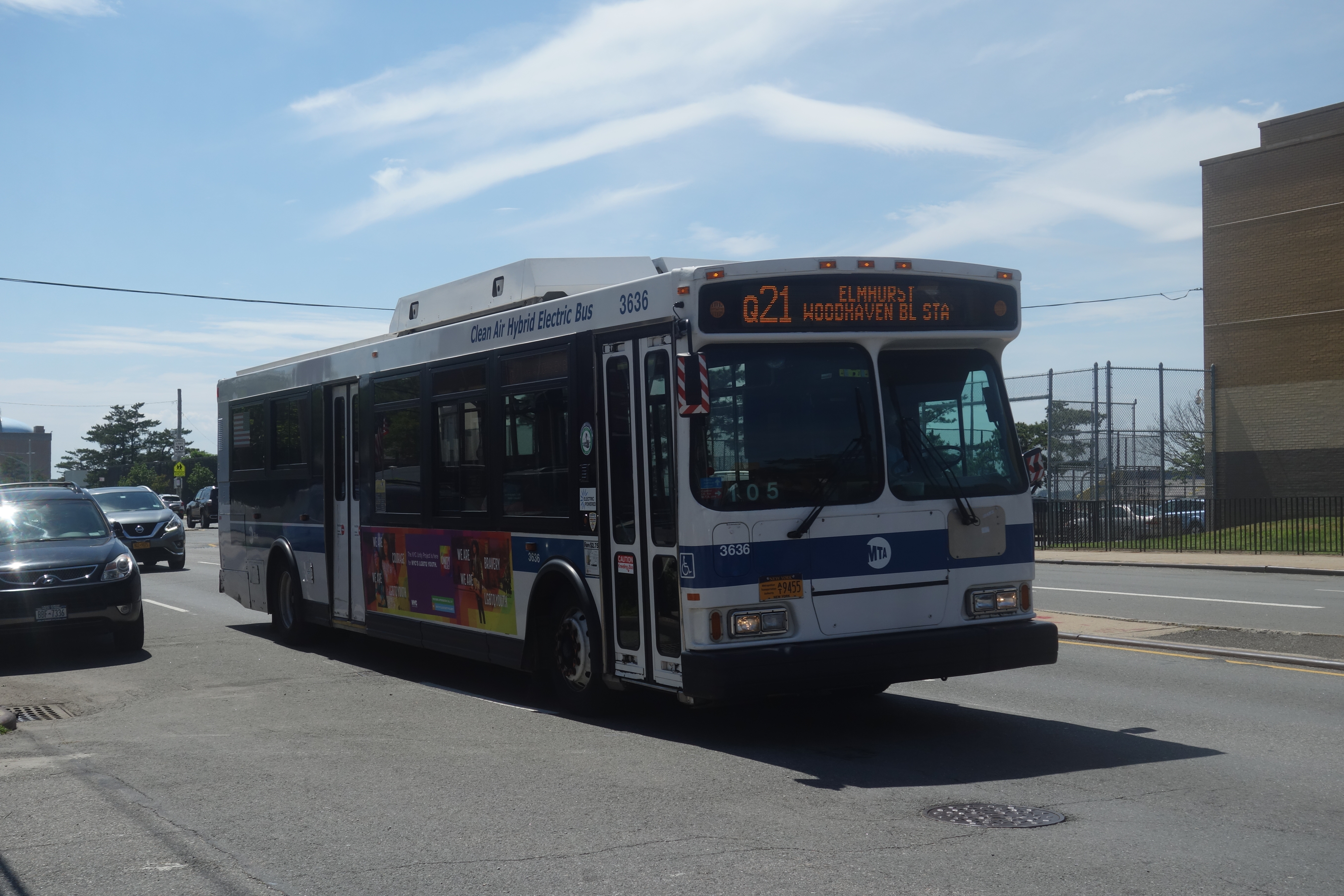
A 2007 Orion VII OG HEV (3636) on the Elmhurst-bound Q21 in "school tripper" service at Beach Channel Drive/Beach 102nd Street.

== History ==
=== Early years: Q11 and Q21 routes ===
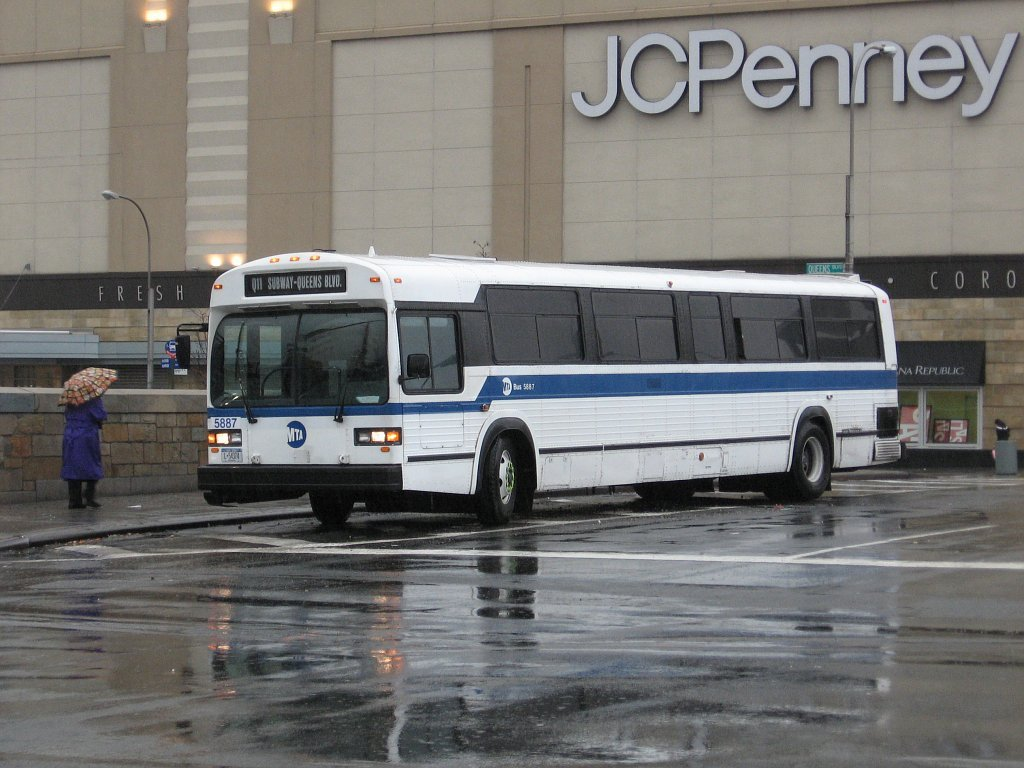
An MCI Classic bus (5887; now retired) on the Q11 laying over near Queens Center.

The Q11 began service in 1918 under Liberty Bus Transportation, also known as New York City Department of Plant & Structures Route 64, between Woodhaven and Howard/Hamilton Beach.

The Q21 began service in 1923. In 1926, it became a route of the Queens Auto Traction Corporation, running between Jamaica Avenue, at the Woodhaven Boulevard station of the BMT Jamaica Line, and Beach 95th Street, at the foot of the bridge from Broad Channel. By the early 1930s, the Q21 became a franchise of Green Bus Lines, and was extended to Rockaway Park. In 1934, the Q21A franchise between East New York and the Rockaways was awarded to Green Lines. On June 15, 1936, the Q21B began service between Brooklyn and Riis Park. That year, Green Lines took over the operations of Liberty Bus, and the borough's bus system was divided into four lettered "zones", with each zone being served exclusively by one bus company. Green Lines was awarded the rights to all of "Zone C" in southern Queens, which included Woodhaven, Richmond Hill, Ozone Park, Howard Beach, and the Rockaways. Following the summer season, the Q21B continued operating until November 1936 when it was discontinued due to lack of profitability.

The Q11 began operations under Green Lines on November 15, 1936. By January 1937, residents of the western Rockaways (at the time called the "West End") petitioned Green Lines for several extensions of service. This included the restoration of the Q21B route, and the extension of the normal Q21 route west from Beach 116th Street to Beach 149th Street via Newport Avenue. When the Marine Parkway Bridge between Brooklyn and the western Rockaways was opened in June 1937, the Q21B was replaced with the Q35. In 1948, Green Lines applied for an extension of the Q21A to the Euclid Avenue subway station which opened that November; this was rejected by the New York City Board of Transportation in December. However, the rerouting to Euclid Avenue station did occur, and the route ran along Pitkin Avenue between Euclid Avenue and Cross Bay Boulevard until its discontinuation.

=== Addition of Q53, extension of Q21, and MTA Bus takeover ===
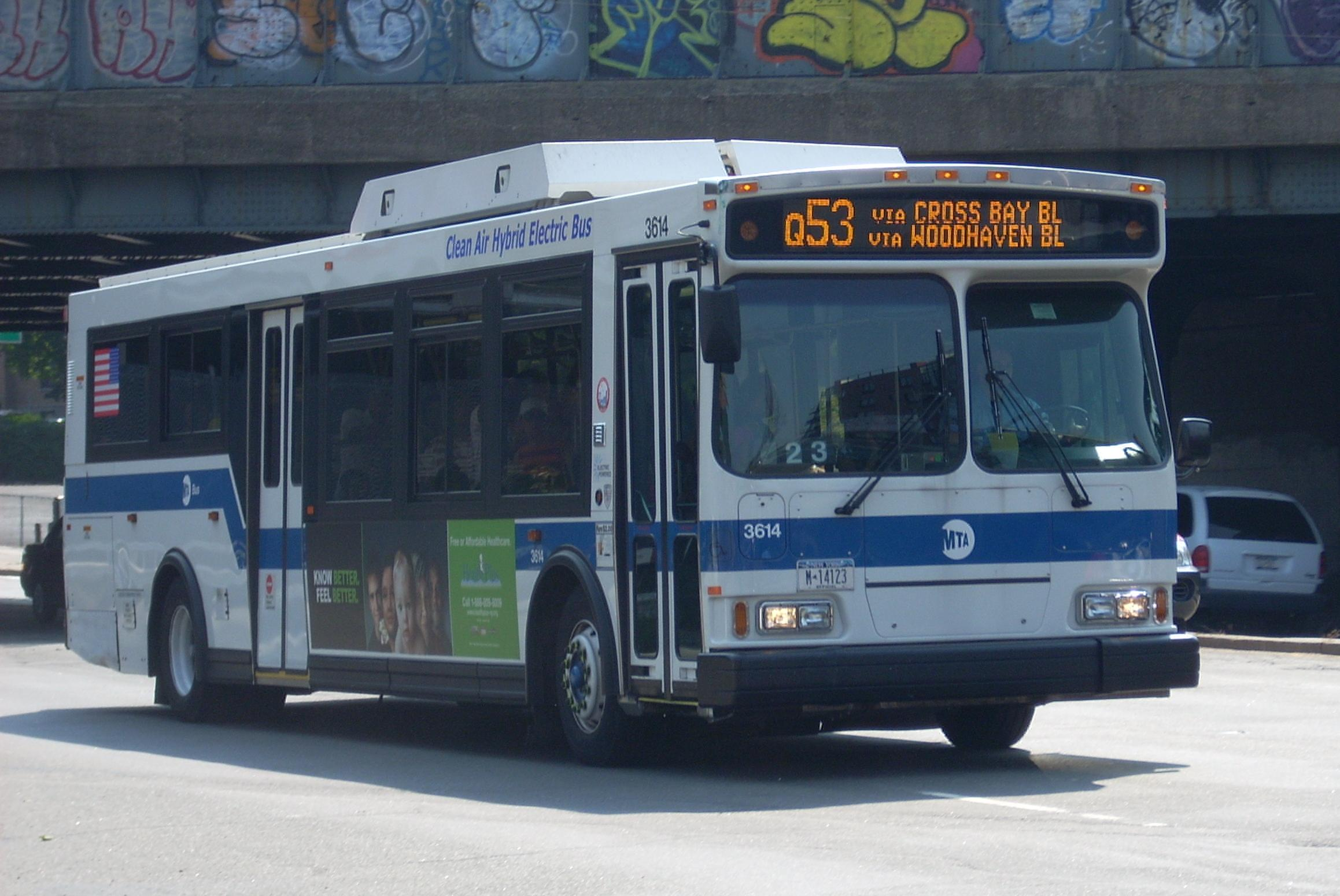
A Q53 bus at Eliot Avenue near Queens Boulevard in 2007.

A 2015 New Flyer XD40 (7475) on the Q53 Limited, prior to SelectBusService implementation

On May 8, 1950, a major fire occurred on the wooden trestle of the LIRR Rockaway Beach Branch over Jamaica Bay, ending direct rail service to the Rockaway peninsula. On June 25, Triboro Coach, which was owned by Green Lines' shareholders, began operating replacement bus service from the Woodside LIRR station to Rockaway Park on a temporary grant from the city. The Q53 officially began service on June 28, 1956, two days after IND Rockaway Line service commenced on the parallel Rockaway Beach Branch. It later gained popularity as a route from mainland Queens to Rockaway Beach and Rockaways' Playland during summer months, as did the Q21 and Q21A.

On January 9, 2006, the MTA Bus Company took over the operations of the Green Lines routes as part of the city's takeover of all the remaining privately operated bus routes. On February 20, 2006, the city took over the operations of Triboro Coach. Shortly after the takeover, in April 2006, the Q53 nonstop express was converted to a standard limited-stop service, with the MTA adding six stops along Woodhaven and Cross Bay Boulevards. In January 2007, the Q53 was routed away from the 63rd Drive subway station, running the entire length of Woodhaven and Cross Bay Boulevards. On August 31, 2008, the Q21 was extended north along Woodhaven Boulevard. These service changes led to an increase in ridership along the corridor. Due to the shift in ridership patterns, late night service on the Q11 after midnight was truncated to Pitkin Avenue on September 12, 2010. Q21 service was also adjusted to run for longer during the evenings.

=== Split of Q21 and Q52 ===
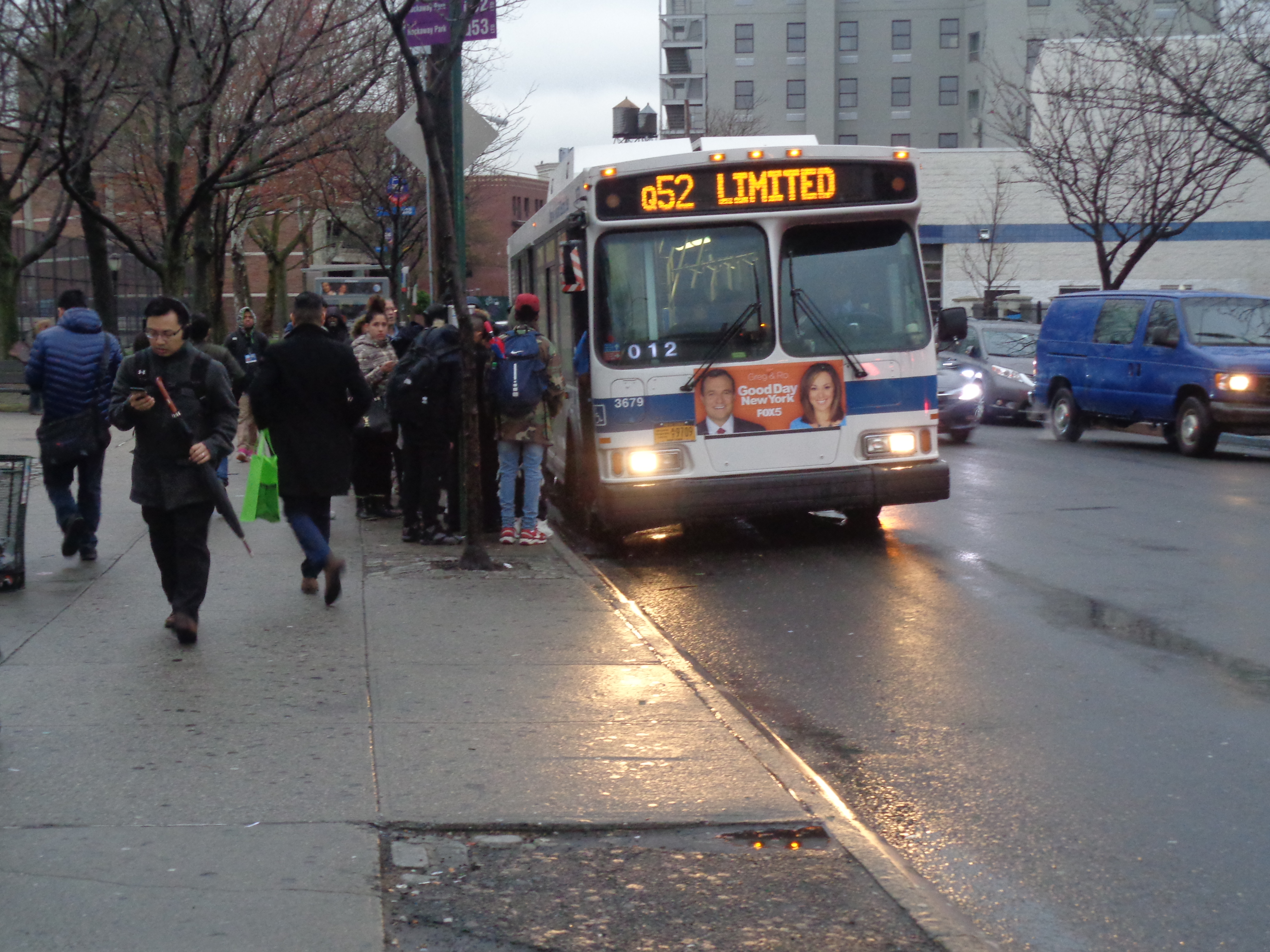
A 2007 Orion VII OG HEV (3679) on the Arverne-bound Q52 Limited at Hoffman Drive in 2016

On January 8, 2012, the Q21 was rerouted from Rockaway Park to Arverne near the Beach 67th Street station, to serve the growing "Arverne by the Sea" urban renewal development. A limited-stop branch of the Q21 was also created, running during weekday rush hours and bypassing the Lindenwood section of the route. On July 1 of that year, several major changes took place along the corridor. The Q21 Limited was converted into the Q52 Limited and expanded to seven days a week, while the Q21 local was truncated to Howard Beach. Overnight service on the Q11 to Hamilton Beach after 10:00 PM was eliminated. In addition, two additional limited stops for the Q52 and Q53 were added along Cross Bay Boulevard in Howard Beach, closing a gap in service previously filled by the Q21.

For a short period of time after Hurricane Sandy in late 2012 and 2013, additional service was provided on the Q52 route. Several 60-foot (18 m) articulated buses, utilized on the Q10, were temporarily transferred for use on the Q52 route. In addition, a free transfer was offered on the MetroCard between the Q22, either the Q52 or Q53, and the A train at the Rockaway Boulevard station. Some articulated buses were still running on the Q52 as of 2014. On September 8, 2013, overnight service was added to the Q53 due to increasing ridership on the route. On April 9, 2017, the Q52 was extended from Beach 69th Street and Rockaway Beach Boulevard to Beach 54th Street and Beach Channel Drive in Edgemere to better serve housing in both Arverne and Edgemere.

=== Select Bus Service ===
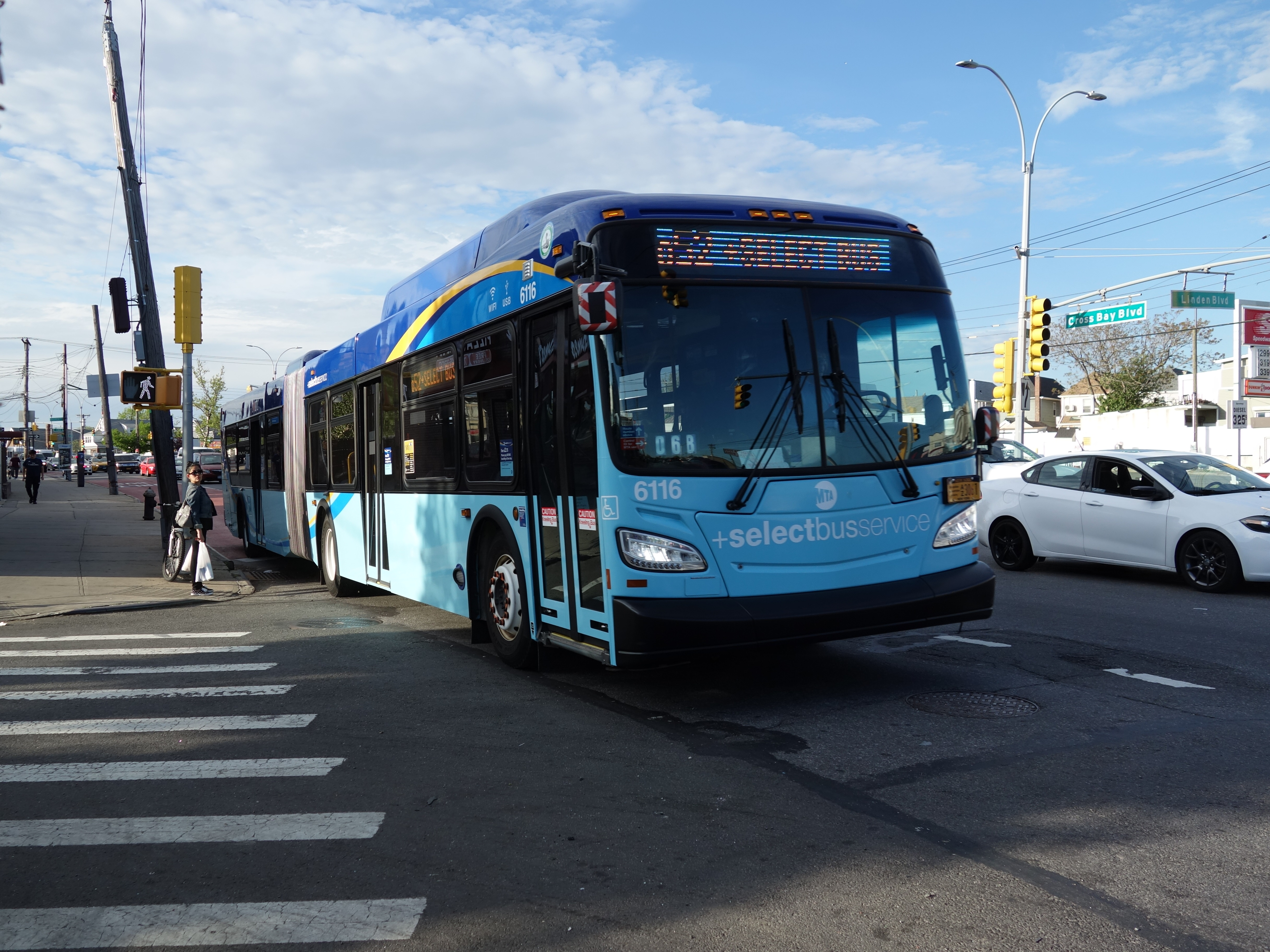
A 2017 XD60 (6116) on the Q52 SBS at Cross Bay/Linden Boulevards

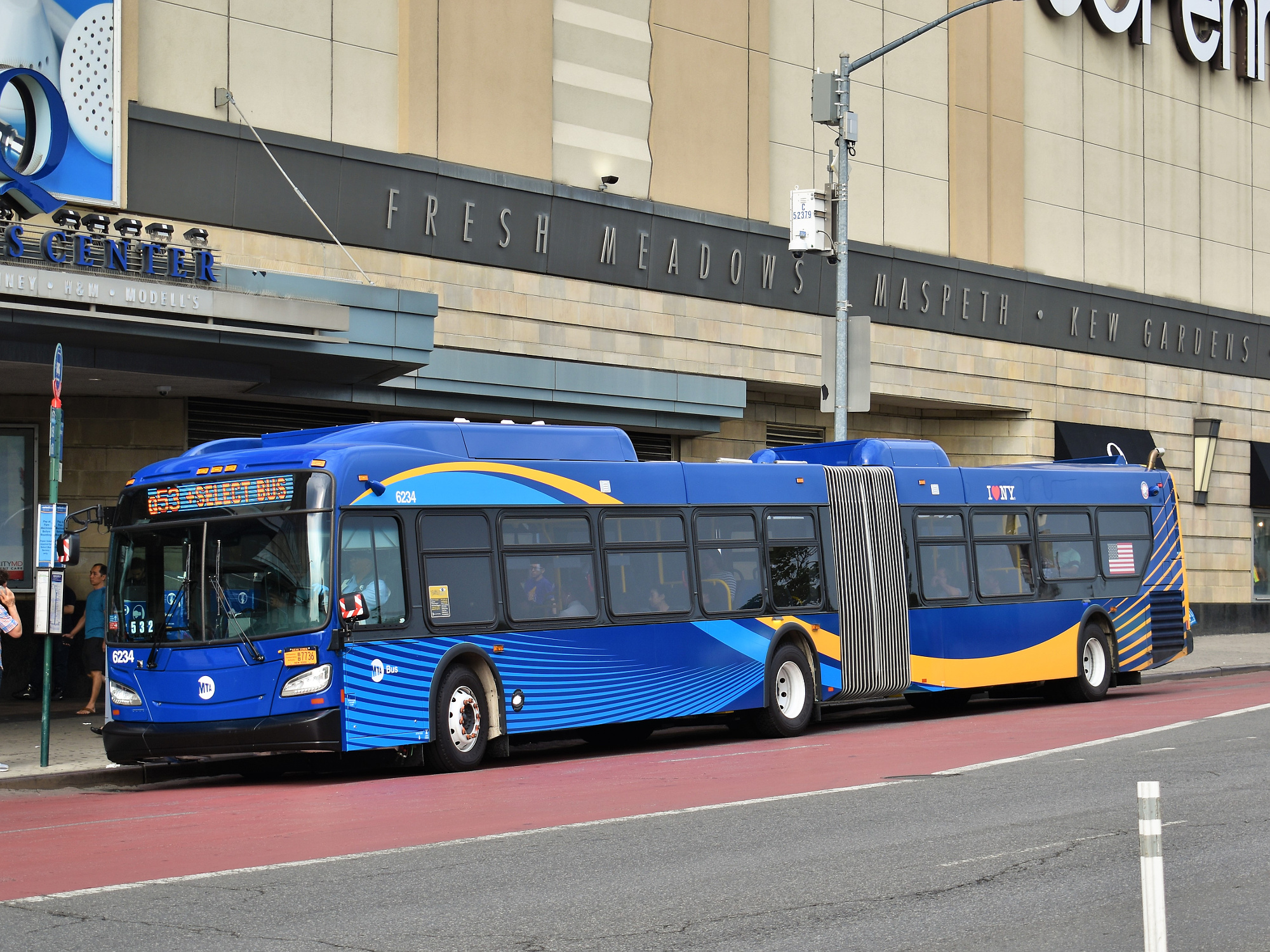
A 2019 XD60 (6234) on the Q53 SBS at Queens Center Mall

==== Planning ====
In 2004, the Woodhaven-Cross Bay corridor was one of twelve Queens bus corridors studied under the city's bus rapid transit (BRT) study, which was meant to determine the feasibility of having dedicated lanes and rebuilt stops to speed up service on BRT corridors. Beginning on January 4, 2008, the New York City Department of Transportation (NYCDOT) conducted an 18-month study on Woodhaven Boulevard as part of the city's Congested Corridors Project to improve congested and dangerous roadways. One of the short-term recommendations of the study was to implement bus rapid transit along the corridor. In June 2010, the Woodhaven-Cross Bay corridor was added to the list of potential corridors for Phase II of Select Bus Service (SBS), the MTA's brand of BRT service.

==== Construction ====
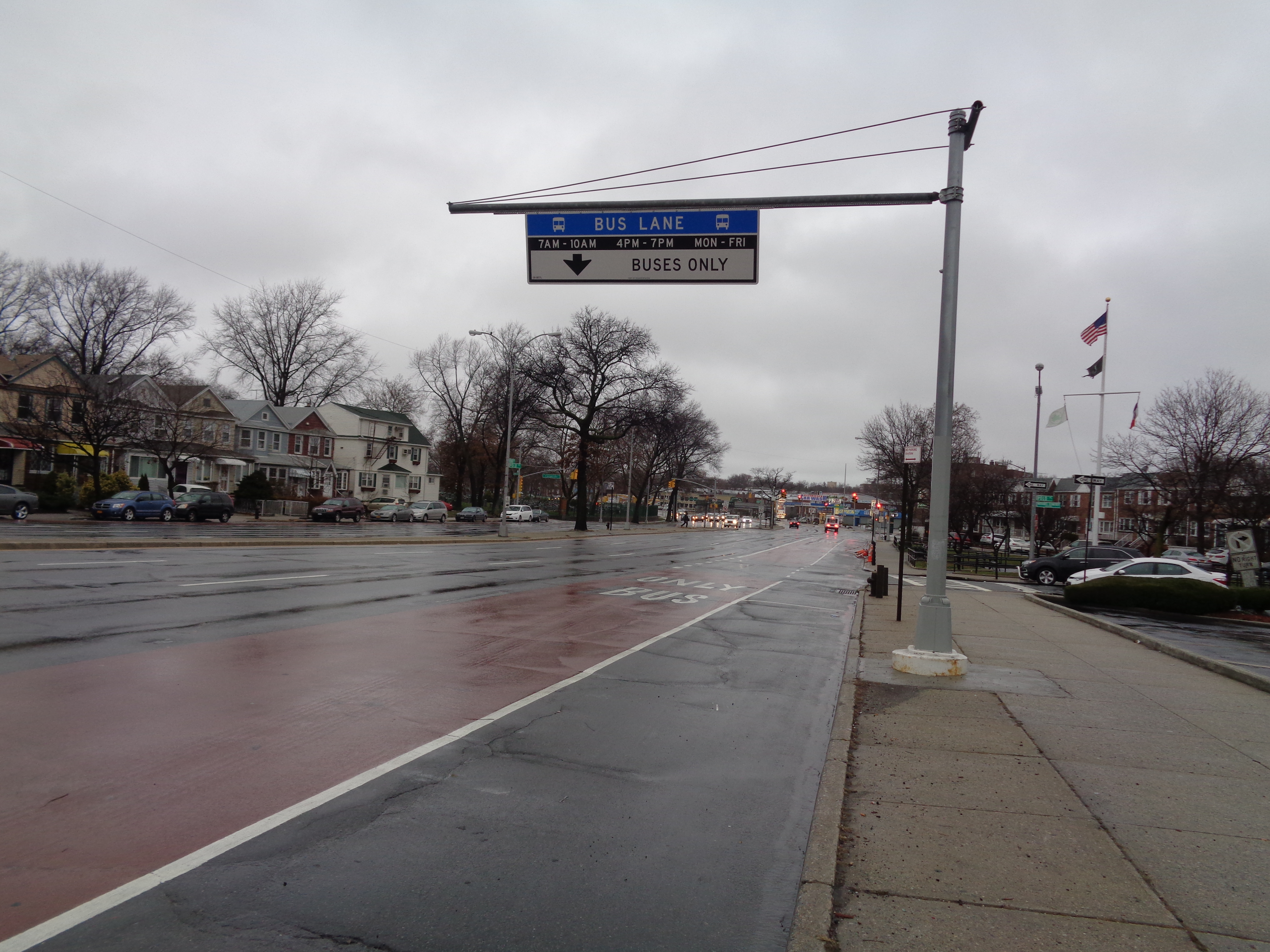
Bus lanes installed along the corridor in 2015, including here at Woodhaven Blvd/Metropolitan Ave.

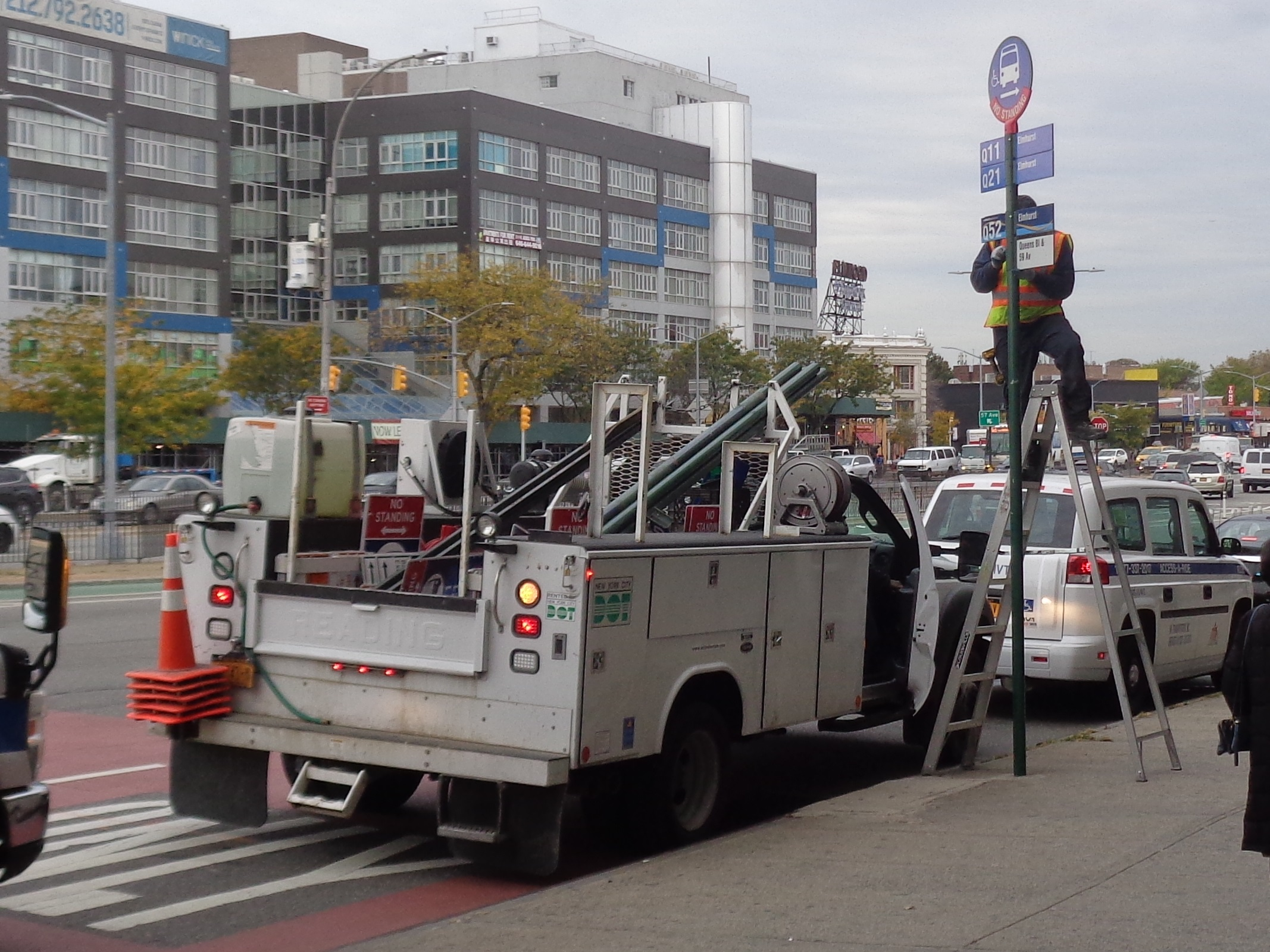
NYCDOT workers install new bus stop signs in November 2017.

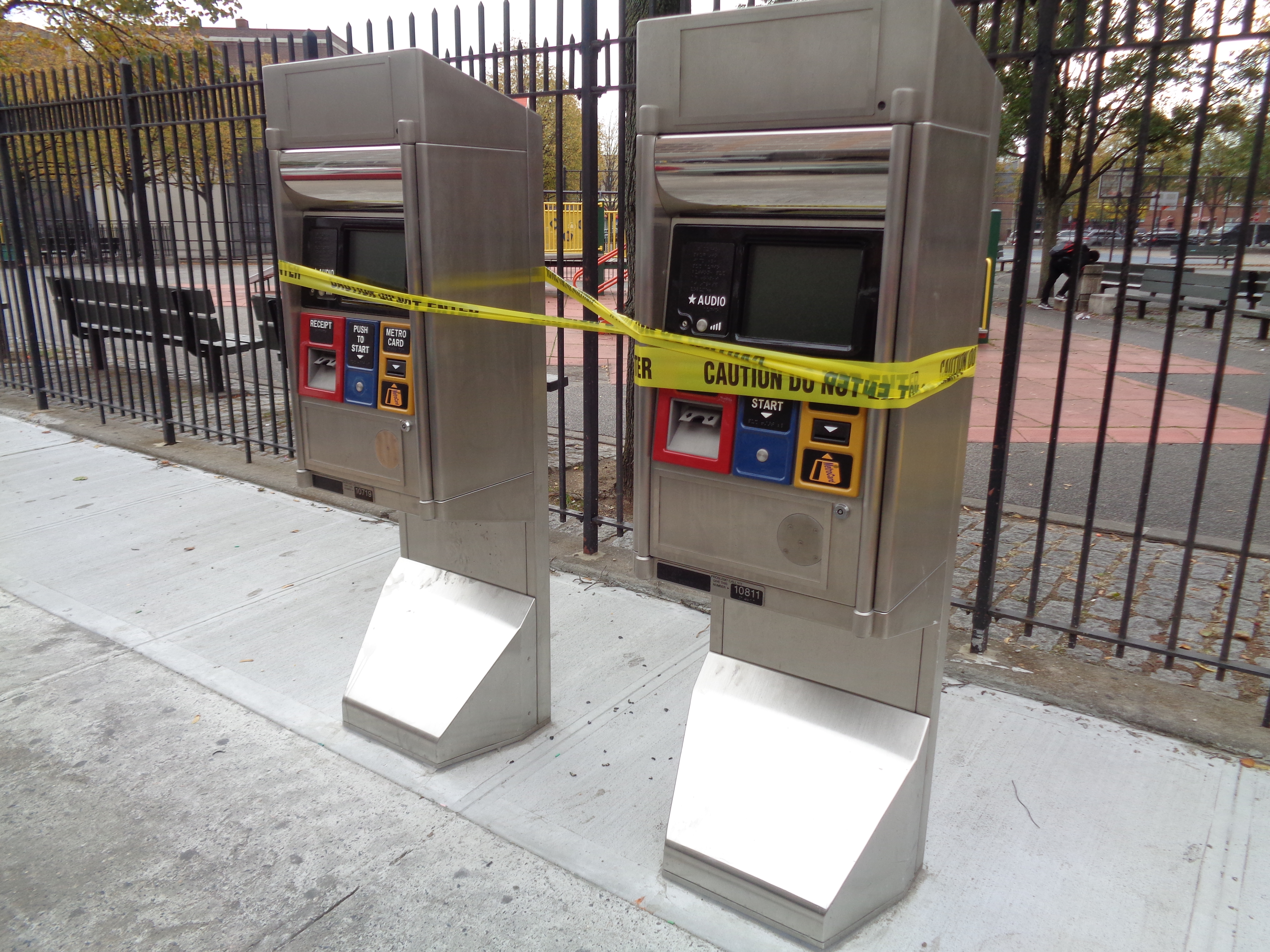
SBS ticket machines being installed at Broadway/78th Street, Queens, in November 2017

Preliminary designs began in 2013 and were released in March 2014. The first dedicated MTA bus lanes were installed in August 2015, on the north end of Woodhaven Boulevard between Dry Harbor Road and Metropolitan Avenue. At this time, the Q52 and Q53 SBS routes were scheduled to begin service in fall 2017, with the remaining bus lanes and street improvements to be implemented in stages afterwards. In September 2017, the NYCDOT announced that the segment of Woodhaven Boulevard between Union Turnpike and 81st Road would also get dedicated bus lanes. As part of that segment's bus lane implementation, the NYCDOT would remove the medians separating service-road and main-road traffic in each direction, as well as expand the median separating the two directions of traffic.

==== Implementation ====
The Q52 and Q53 were slowly converted to articulated buses beginning in October 2017, before SBS was implemented on the corridor on November 12. In the Rockaways and in Broad Channel, due to less dense land uses, and due to lower utilization of stops, several existing Q52 and Q53 stops were consolidated or discontinued. Q22 local service continued to serve the stops in the Rockaways, while the low volume stops at Cross Bay Boulevard and 5th Road were discontinued. A new stop at Rockaway Beach Boulevard and Beach 84th Street replaced stops at Beach 81st Street and Beach 86th Street on the Q52. In Broad Channel two stops were relocated: the northbound stop at Cross Bay Boulevard and East 9th Road was moved north to Noel Road to be symmetrical with the southbound stop, and the southbound stop at West 15th Road was moved south to West 17th Road to be symmetrical with the northbound stop, and to be adjacent to a crosswalk. Stops on Woodhaven Boulevard were modified as well: the stop at Atlantic Avenue was moved north to 91st Avenue, allowing Q52 and Q53 service to travel on the overpass over Atlantic Avenue using the bus lane, as opposed to using the slow service road. Two SBS stops were added–at 101st Avenue and Woodhaven Boulevard, and at Pitkin Avenue and Cross Bay Boulevard–to provide transfers to the Q8 and Q11, respectively. Stations on Woodhaven Boulevard at Jamaica Avenue, 91st Avenue and 101st Avenue, and at Cross Bay Boulevard at Liberty Avenue (northbound) and Rockaway Boulevard (southbound) are new stations that were built in the median by the NYCDOT.

Q11 and Q21 service on Woodhaven Boulevard were modified in conjunction with the implementation of SBS. The bus stops at 63rd Avenue and 64th Road in both directions, and the northbound stop at 67th Drive were discontinued in order to even out the spacing of bus stops. The southbound stop at 68th Avenue was moved to Yellowstone Boulevard to be near a crosswalk, the Park Lane South stops was moved to 85th Road, and the southbound Doxey Place stop was moved to Gold Road.

==== Opposition ====
The implementation of SBS on the Woodhaven/Cross Bay corridor has been supported by transit advocates and bus riders, particularly those in the Rockaways. However, many residents of the communities north of the Rockaways, particularly car users and business owners, have opposed the Select Bus Service project. Much of the opposition has been due to the implementation of bus lanes down the center of the boulevard, which could cause increased traffic congestion. The plan in April 2015 would have prohibited left-turns at twelve intersections.

In January 2016, City Council Member Eric Ulrich, a Republican representing Ozone Park, came out against the plan as among other things, it prohibited left turns at Jamaica Avenue. He had been in favor of bus rapid transit along Woodhaven Boulevard, as he stated in a 2014 opinion editorial. The plan was modified in May 2016 in an effort to accommodate Ulrich's objections. It included restrictions on left-turns at only five intersections, including none at Jamaica Avenue. The left-turn restrictions were put into the plan to speed up travel times by eliminating the signal time allocated to split phasing—a traffic-signal setup where traffic in one direction has a green light, while the other directions of traffic have a red light, in order to allow drivers at the green light to turn left without conflicts from oncoming traffic. The restrictions also reduce conflicts between turning vehicles and pedestrians. Instead of banning left turns at Jamaica Avenue, the left turn bays would be re-engineered around the BMT Jamaica Line subway columns to decrease blind spots and collisions. Local community members were also opposed to the plan due to the reduction of traffic lanes along the boulevard's service roads from two lanes to a single lane.

=== Bus redesign ===
In December 2019, the MTA released a draft redesign of the Queens bus network. As part of the redesign, the Woodhaven and Cross Bay Boulevards corridor would have contained a "high-density" route, the QT52 (following the Q52 SBS), with the Q53 being discontinued. The Q11 and Q21 would have been rearranged into two "neighborhood" routes, but with a different arrangement. The QT83 would have made local stops on Woodhaven and Cross Bay Boulevards, while the QT88A/B would have combined the branches of the Q11 and Q21. The redesign was delayed due to the COVID-19 pandemic in New York City in 2020, and the original draft plan was dropped due to negative feedback.

A revised plan was released in March 2022. As part of the new plan, the Q11 would be shortened, running from Howard Beach/Hamilton Beach to the Rockaway Boulevard station, would not serve the Woodhaven/Cross Bay corridor at all and have overnight service eliminated. The Q21 would be extended north in Elmhurst to the 82nd Street–Jackson Heights station, replacing the Q29 bus, which would be discontinued; in Howard Beach, the Q21 would run along 84th Street instead of Cross Bay Boulevard. The Q21 would also gain overnight service. The Q52 SBS and Q53 SBS would both be preserved, but both would terminate at Jackson Heights–Roosevelt Avenue/74th Street instead (representing an extension of the Q52 SBS and a truncation of the Q53 SBS), have a stop added at Eliot Avenue (southbound Q53 SBS would skip this stop) and some of their bus stops would be moved to be realigned closer to major cross streets.

A final bus-redesign plan was released in December 2023. The final plan called for the Q21 to be eliminated; the Q11 would be rerouted in Lindenwood to serve several former Q21 stops, and frequencies on the Q11 would be increased to match the former combined frequency of the Q11 and the Q21. The Q52 and Q53 would not be modified at all.

On December 17, 2024, addendums to the final plan were released. Among these, stop changes were made to the Q11. The Q52 SBS will serve more of Edgemere, originating and terminating at Beach 50th Street, with a new stop in the Elmhurst direction. On January 29, 2025, the current plan was approved by the MTA Board, and the Queens Bus Redesign went into effect in two different phases during Summer 2025. Both routes are part of Phase II, which began on August 31, 2025, the same day as the Q21's cancellation. As of this date, a Q52 extension to more of the Rockaways is still being considered for a separate implementation.

== Incidents ==
In the morning of January 30, 2012, a Q21 or Q53 bus with two passengers onboard caught fire after entering the Rockaways. The engine may have suffered from overheating, but no one was hurt.

== Public art ==
The bus stops at Liberty Avenue, 91st Avenue, and Jamaica Avenue have art installations on their railings that relate to local history.

== In popular culture ==
The 1977 song "Rockaway Beach" by Forest Hills-based band the Ramones references the bus ride to the Rockaways. It includes the lines:

Bus ride is too slow
they blast out the disco on the radio
