= Green Bus Lines =

Defunct bus company in New York City (1925–2006)

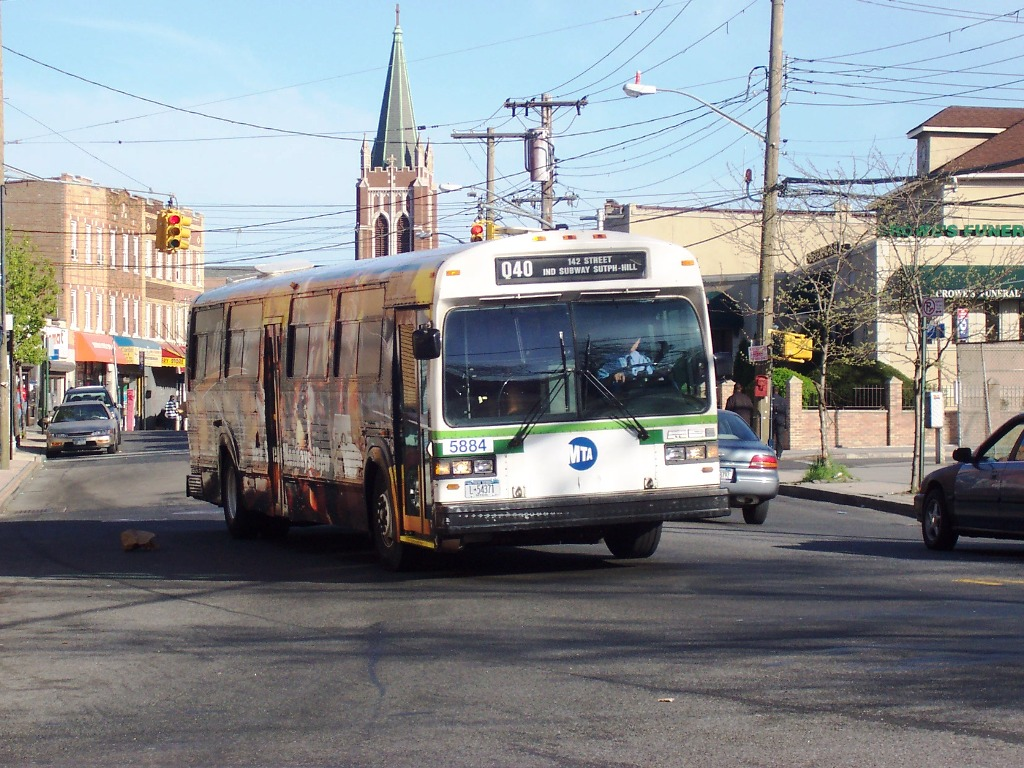
- Former Green Line Q40 MCI Classic in South Jamaica, Queens
- Parent: GTJ Reit Incorporated
- Founded: 1925
- Defunct: 2006
- Headquarters: 165-25 147th Avenue; Springfield Gardens, NY 11434-5295

Green Bus Lines, also referred to as Green Lines, was a private bus company in New York City. It operated local service in Queens and express service to Manhattan until January 9, 2006, when the city-operated MTA Bus Company took over its routes. It was managed most recently by Jerome Cooper (1928–2015).

Green Bus Lines routes primarily operated in the Jamaica, Ozone Park, Howard Beach, South Jamaica, and the Rockaways areas of Queens, along with service to the passenger and cargo areas of John F. Kennedy International Airport. At the time of its closure, Green Lines operated more local and limited bus routes than any other private company in the city.

Stockholders of Green Bus Lines also held control of other private bus companies in Queens and Brooklyn as Transit Alliance. These companies were Triboro Coach, Jamaica Buses, and Command Bus Company, all of which were absorbed into the MTA Regional Bus operations. The company reorganized as GTJ Reit Inc., a real estate investment trust, shortly after MTA takeover.

== History ==
The company was incorporated on April 3, 1925, by William Cooper and Martin Klein to provide local service in certain boroughs. Cooper originally began operating a single bus line, a portion of today's Q8 101-Jerome Avenue route, in 1922. The company was formed from several independently-operated bus lines, whose owners operated the buses, and would become stockholders and employees in Green Lines.

The company acquired several Manhattan routes (including M22, M50, M79, M86, and M96) in 1933, but these were transferred to the Comprehensive Omnibus Corporation in 1935 and New York City Omnibus Corporation in 1936. That year, Green Lines took over the operations of Liberty Bus, and the borough's bus system was divided into four lettered "zones", with each zone being served exclusively by one bus company. Green Lines was awarded the rights to all of "Zone C" in southern Queens, which included Woodhaven, Richmond Hill, Ozone Park, Howard Beach, and the Rockaways. With that move, Green Lines assumed the operations of seven other companies in the region. Green also acquired the Manhattan and Queens Bus Corporation, which had operated the ex-Manhattan and Queens Traction Company Queens Boulevard Line into Manhattan (the Q60) since 1937, in 1943.

Green stockholders acquired two other transit companies that continued to operate independently: Triboro Coach Corporation in October 1947, and Jamaica Buses in April 1949. Jointly these three companies formed Command Bus Company in 1979 to take over the routes that had been previously operated by Pioneer Bus Corporation, which went out of the transit bus business following a bitter strike earlier in 1979.

The QM23 was started in the 1950s to replace Long Island Rail Road service to the Brooklyn Manor station on the Rockaway Beach Branch. It was discontinued in 2010 under MTA operations. Four more express routes began operation in the 1970s.

== Bus routes ==
Just prior to MTA Bus takeover, Green Bus lines operated the following routes, which mostly continued to be based in Far Rockaway Bus Depot and John F. Kennedy Bus Depot. Hubs for Green Lines operations included 165th Street Bus Terminal in Jamaica, the Mott Avenue subway station in Far Rockaway, and several stations on the IND Queens Boulevard Line.

Route	Terminal A	Major streets of travel	Terminal B	Notes
Queens Local
Q6	Jamaica; 165th Street Bus Terminal; Bays 14, 15, 16	Jamaica Avenue, Sutphin Boulevard, Rockaway Boulevard, North Boundary Road	JFK International Airport; North Boundary Road and Eastern Road, and USPS Airport Mail Facility	Originally operated by Queens Bus Corporation, it first operated on July 19, 1922.; Extended to 165th Street Terminal ca. 1989.; Q6 Limited-stop service added by MTA on April 19, 2010; discontinued in 2025.; Does not serve passenger terminals.; Short-turns to Rockaway Boulevard and Archer Avenue discontinued in 2025.
Q7	City Line, Brooklyn; Euclid Avenue and Pitkin Avenue at Euclid Avenue ( A C trains)	Pitkin Avenue, Rockaway Boulevard, 150th Street	JFK International Airport; 148th Street and South Cargo Road	Originally operated by the Ruoff Brothers, it started service on October 5, 1921 as DP&S Route 66.; Does not serve passenger terminals.; Western end rerouted to 75th Street-Elderts Lane station via Rockaway Boulevard in 2025; old route replaced by Q112 of Jamaica Buses.
Q8	Jamaica; 165th Street Bus Terminal; Bay 17 and 18	Jamaica Avenue, 101st Avenue, Fountain Avenue	Spring Creek, Brooklyn; Gateway Center Mall	Service started on April 15, 1933.; Extended to 165th Street Terminal ca. 1989; Extended from City Line at Euclid Avenue to Spring Creek at Gateway Drive and Erskine Street on June 29, 2008.; Extended to new bus terminal at Gateway Center North on August 31, 2014.; Alternate rush hour buses terminate/start at Euclid Avenue and Pitkin Avenue( A C trains)
Q9	Jamaica; 165th Street Bus Terminal; Bay 19 and 20	Jamaica Avenue, Sutphin Boulevard, Liberty Avenue, 135th Street (Northbound), Van Wyck Expressway Service Road (Southbound), Lincoln Street.	South Ozone Park; Rockaway Boulevard and Lincoln Street	Originally operated by Ludwig Billow, it started service on May 1, 1920, as DP&S Route 55.; Extended to 165th Street Terminal ca. 1989
Q9A	Jamaica; 165th Street Bus Terminal	Lincoln Street, Linden Boulevard, Merrick Boulevard	South Ozone Park; Rockaway Boulevard and Lincoln Street	Under MTA, became Q89 on April 7, 2008.; Discontinued June 27, 2010 due to budget crisis.; Operated one trip per hour in each direction between 10 AM and 5 PM weekdays; only bus route in New York City to not serve any subway or rail stations along its route.; Replaced by Q51 Limited in 2025 between Ozone Park and Cambria Heights.
Q10	Kew Gardens; 80th Road and Kew Gardens Road at Kew Gardens–Union Turnpike ( E F <F> trains)	Lefferts Boulevard, Rockaway Boulevard, 130th Street, Van Wyck Expressway Service Road	JFK International Airport; Terminal 5	Originally operated by Richmond Hill Bus, service began on April 29, 1929, as DP&S Route 53.; Acquired by Green Bus Lines on November 25, 1936.; Expanded to Idlewild Airport in 1947.; Q10A existed between 1990 and 1996.; Conduit Avenue branch discontinued in 2011.; Pan Am Road branch used by local buses 2011-2013.; JFK Terminus moved to Terminal 5 on May 30, 2012, due to construction at Terminal 4.; Some daytime trips operate only between Kew Gardens and South Ozone Park, and do not enter the airport.; Local/Limited to JFK Airport's Central Terminal Areas; Pan Am Road branch renumbered to Q80 in 2025.
Q11	Elmhurst; Queens Boulevard and Woodhaven Boulevard at Woodhaven Boulevard ( E F M R trains) and Queens Center Mall	Woodhaven Boulevard, Cross Bay Boulevard, then: Toward Old Howard Beach: 160th Avenue, 99th Street; Toward Hamilton Beach: 104th Street.	Old Howard Beach 165th Avenue and 99th Street at Charles Park; or -; Hamilton Beach 165th Avenue and 104th Street	Originally operated by Liberty Bus, service was started in 1918, as DP&S Route 64.; Acquired by Green Bus Lines in the early-1930s.; Weekday rush hours, some southbound service terminates at Pitkin Avenue and Cross Bay Boulevard in Ozone Park.; Overnight service to Old Howard Beach and Hamilton Beach eliminated September 12, 2010; service to Hamilton Beach after 10:00 PM eliminated on July 1, 2012.; Overnights, the southern terminal is at 157th Avenue and Cross Bay Boulevard (Pitkin Avenue until 2025).; Rerouted from Centreville to Lindenwood with southern branches combined in 2025.
Q21	Elmhurst; Queens Boulevard and Woodhaven Boulevard at Woodhaven Boulevard ( E F M R trains) and Queens Center Mall	Woodhaven Boulevard, 155th Avenue, 157th Avenue, Cross Bay Boulevard	Howard Beach; 164th Avenue and 92nd Street	Originally owned by Queens Auto Traction, service began in 1923.; Operates via Lindenwood between Howard Beach and Ozone Park via 157th Avenue.; Formerly ran from Liberty Avenue to Rockaway Park; extended along Woodhaven Boulevard on August 31, 2008.; Rerouted from Rockaway Park to Arverne on January 8, 2012.; Truncated from Arverne to Howard Beach in July 2012 (Rockaway service replaced by Q52).; Merged into Q11 in 2025.
Q21A	Far Rockaway; Mott Avenue and Beach 20th Street at Far Rockaway – Mott Avenue ( A train)	Edgemere Avenue, Cross Bay Boulevard, Pitkin Avenue, Linden Boulevard	East New York, Brooklyn; Livonia Avenue and New Lots Avenue at New Lots Avenue ( 2 3 4 5 trains)	Discontinued in 1990, due to poor ridership.
Q22	Far Rockaway; Mott Avenue and Beach 20th Street at Far Rockaway – Mott Avenue ( A train)	Beach Channel Drive, Rockaway Beach Boulevard	Roxbury; Beach 169th Street and Rockaway Point Boulevard	Originally owned by Long Island Coach Company, service began in 1912.; Truncated to Rockaway Park-Beach 116th Street station ( A S trains) on all trips in 2025.; Extended to Far Rockaway LIRR in 2025.
Q22A	Far Rockaway; Mott Avenue and Beach 20th Street at Far Rockaway – Mott Avenue ( A train)	Mott Avenue	Bayswater	Discontinued in 2008. Operated by Green Bus Lines until MTA takeover in 2005.; Operated one morning trip to Mott Avenue and one afternoon trip to Bayswater only.; Trips restored as part of Q22 service in 2025.
Q35	Midwood, Brooklyn; Avenue H and Flatbush Avenue at Flatbush Avenue ( 2 5 trains)	Flatbush Avenue, Newport Avenue	Rockaway Park; Beach 116th Street and Newport Avenue	Green Bus Lines began service on July 3, 1937; originally ran non-stop between the Rockaways and Brooklyn College.; Travels between Brooklyn and Queens via the Marine Parkway–Gil Hodges Memorial Bridge.; Rerouted from Newport Avenue to Rockaway Beach Boulevard and extended to Beach Channel Drive/Beach 108th Street in 2025.
Q37	Kew Gardens; Union Turnpike and Kew Gardens Road at Kew Gardens–Union Turnpike ( E F <F> trains)	Park Lane South, 111th Street, 135th Avenue	South Ozone Park; 135th Road and 131st Street	Originally operated by General Omnibus Company, service began in January 1939.; Extended from Jamaica Avenue to Kew Gardens on November 23, 1941.; Daily service via Aqueduct Racetrack added in 2011.; Q37B implemented in 2017 to bypass Aqueduct Racetrack due to low ridership.; Streamlined via Rockaway Boulevard and Lefferts Boulevard in 2025.
Q40	Jamaica; Sutphin Boulevard and Hillside Avenue at Sutphin Boulevard ( F <F> train)	Sutphin Boulevard, Lakewood Avenue, 142nd Street	South Jamaica; 135th Avenue and 143rd Street	Originally operated by Midland Coach, service began on February 5, 1934.
Q41	Jamaica; 165th Street Bus Terminal; Bay 22 and 23	127th Street, 109th Avenue, Cross Bay Boulevard	Howard Beach; 164th Avenue and 92nd Street	Originally operated by Courier Bus Company, service began on July 10, 1934.; Extended from Guy R. Brewer Boulevard-Archer Avenue to 165th Street Terminal ca. 1989; Rerouted from 111th Avenue to 109th Avenue in 2012.; Rerouted from 127th Street & Atlantic Avenue to Lakewood Avenue & Sutphin Boulevard in 2025.
Q60	East Midtown, Manhattan; Second Avenue and 60th Street	Queensboro Bridge, Queens Boulevard, Sutphin Boulevard	South Jamaica; 109th Avenue and 157th Street	Service started on April 17, 1937 to replace Queens Boulevard Line streetcar.; Overnight service added in August 2007.; Alternate daytime and early evening buses terminate/start at Sutphin Boulevard ( E J Z trains, LIRR, AirTrain) as of 2010.; Streamlined in Queens Plaza in 2025.
Queens-Manhattan express
QM15	Midtown Manhattan; 6th Avenue	Manhattan: 34th Street, 6th Avenue, 57th Street; Queens: Woodhaven Boulevard, Cross Bay Boulevard	Howard Beach; 157th Avenue and 102nd Street	Lindenwood/Woodhaven-Cross Bay Express; No Sunday service.; Last dropoff is at 57th Street.; Service is supplemented by the BM5 north of Conduit Avenue.; Extended to Beach 54th Street in Arverne via Beach Channel Drive in 2025, with some trips terminating in Lindenwood or Howard Beach.
QM16	Midtown Manhattan; 6th Avenue	Manhattan: 34th Street, 6th Avenue, 57th Street; Queens: Cross Bay Boulevard, Rockaway Beach Boulevard	Jacob Riis Park; Parking lot	Rockaway Park Express; Now Neponsit/Rockaway Park Express; Service north of 157th Avenue in Howard Beach, via Lindenwood and along Woodhaven and Cross Bay Boulevards eliminated on July 3, 2006.; Extended from Rockaway Park to Neponsit on September 4, 2007, then Roxbury at Fort Tilden on April 18, 2011, before being truncated to Jacob Riis Park in December 2011 to accommodate customer parking.; Last dropoff is at 57th Street.
QM17	Midtown Manhattan; 6th Avenue	Manhattan: 34th Street, 6th Avenue, 57th Street; Queens: Cross Bay Boulevard, Beach Channel Drive, Seagirt Boulevard	Far Rockaway; Far Rockaway-Mott Avenue subway station ( A train)	Far Rockaway Express; Service north of 157th Avenue in Howard Beach, via Lindenwood and along Woodhaven and Cross Bay Boulevards eliminated on July 3, 2006.; Last dropoff is at 57th Street.
QM18	Midtown Manhattan; 6th Avenue	Manhattan: 34th Street, 6th Avenue, 57th Street; Queens: Queens Boulevard, Lefferts Boulevard, 135th Avenue	South Ozone Park; 130th Street and 150th Avenue	South Ozone Park Express; Extended along 135th Avenue in spring 2008.; Last dropoff is at 57th Street.
QM23	Midtown Manhattan; 33rd Street and 7th Avenue at Penn Station	Manhattan: 34th Street; Queens: Woodhaven Boulevard, Jamaica Avenue	Woodhaven; 102nd Street and Jamaica Avenue	Brooklyn Manor Express; Discontinued June 27, 2010 due to budget crisis

== Depots ==
=== Original Idlewild depot ===
Green Bus Lines' first southeast Queens depot (also known as Cornell Park) was located at 149th Street and 147th Avenue (148-02 147th Avenue) in what was then South Ozone Park, Queens. The facility, which contained an office building and a bus garage, opened in May 1939 at a cost of $250,000. This area has since been de-mapped and is now on the grounds of John F. Kennedy International Airport.

=== Second Idlewild/JFK depot ===
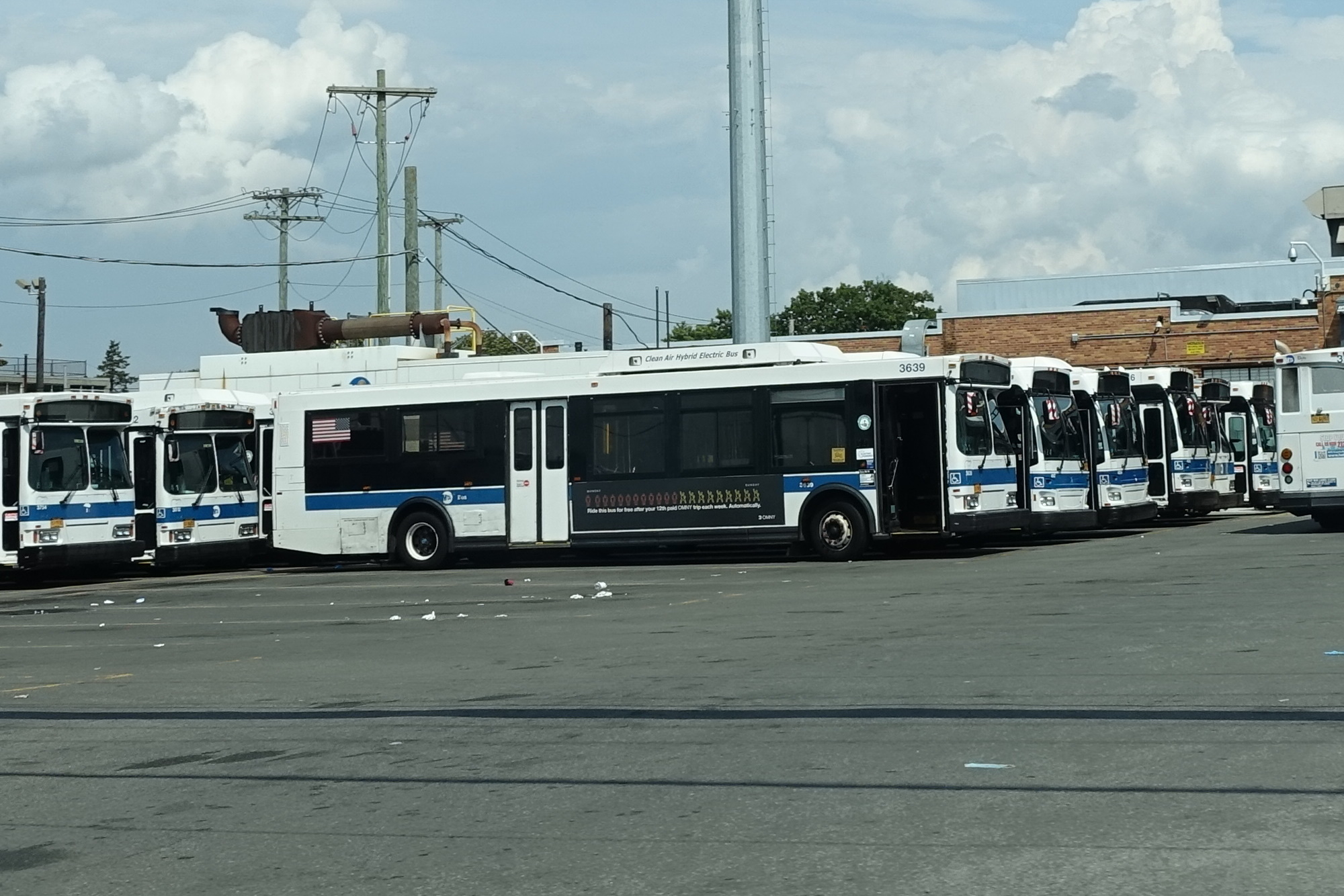
Some Orion VII Old Gens and Next Gens at JFK Depot

Green Lines' second southeast Queens garage was located in Jamaica at 147th Avenue and Rockaway Boulevard (165-25 147th Avenue) near JFK Airport. The depot was built from 1951 to 1952 at the cost of $500,000. It was the primary storage and maintenance facility for the company. It is now the John F. Kennedy Depot (or JFK Depot) of MTA Bus.

40.661348°N 73.773916°W

=== Rockaway Garage ===
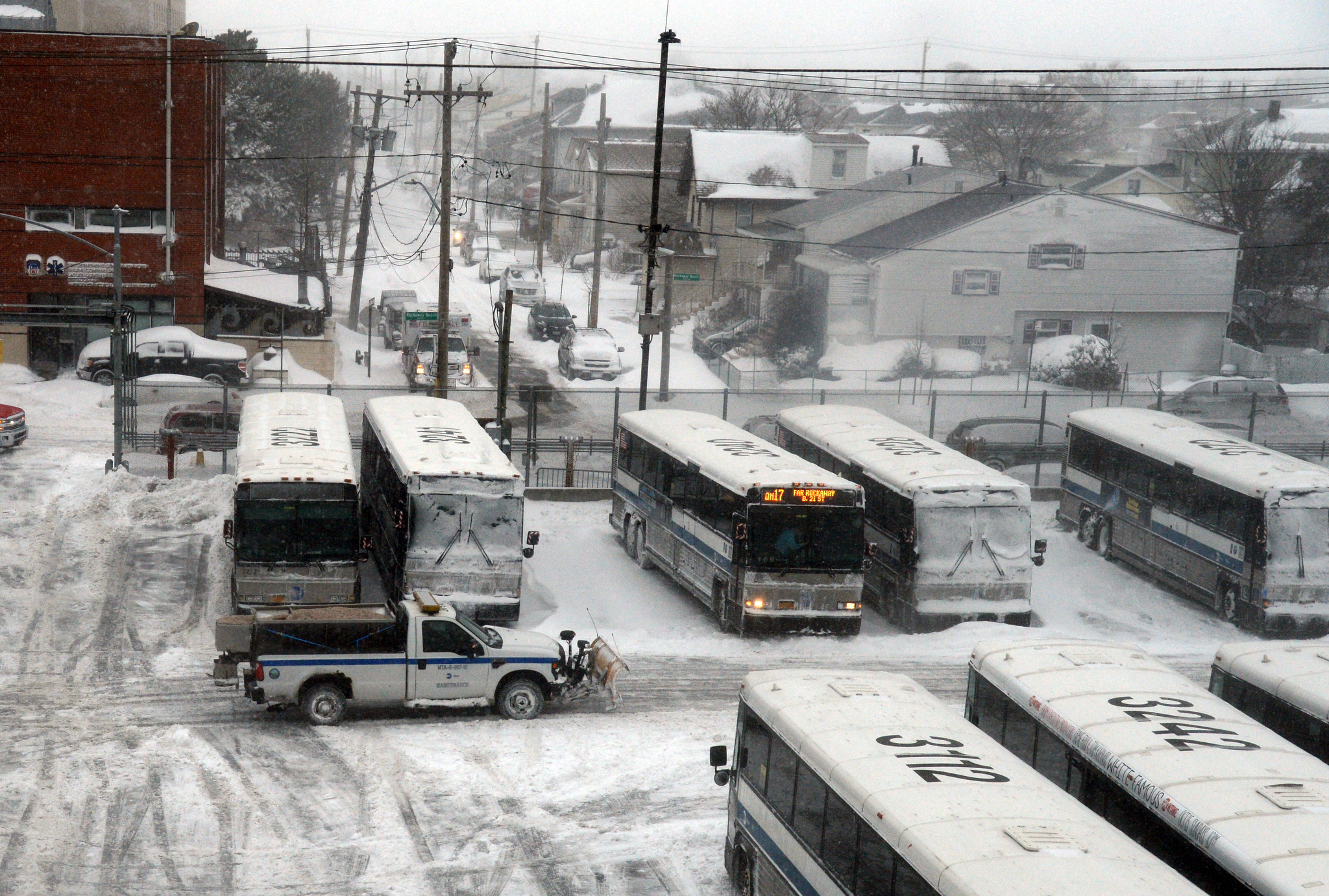
Some MCI buses at Far Rockaway Depot

Green Lines operated a facility on the Rockaway Peninsula, situated on Rockaway Beach Boulevard and Beach 49th Street (49-19 Rockaway Beach Boulevard) in the neighborhood of Arverne. It was sometimes referred to as the "Rockaway Garage". A satellite facility, it primarily housed buses serving the Rockaways and southern Queens, performing light maintenance work. It is now MTA Bus' Far Rockaway Depot. Under MTA takeover, the present fleet at Far Rockaway began exchanging with JFK’s fleet after Hurricane Sandy hit in 2012.

40.592950°N 73.779614°W
