= 165th Street Bus Terminal =

Bus terminal in Queens, New York

Coordinates: 40.7075°N 73.7955°W

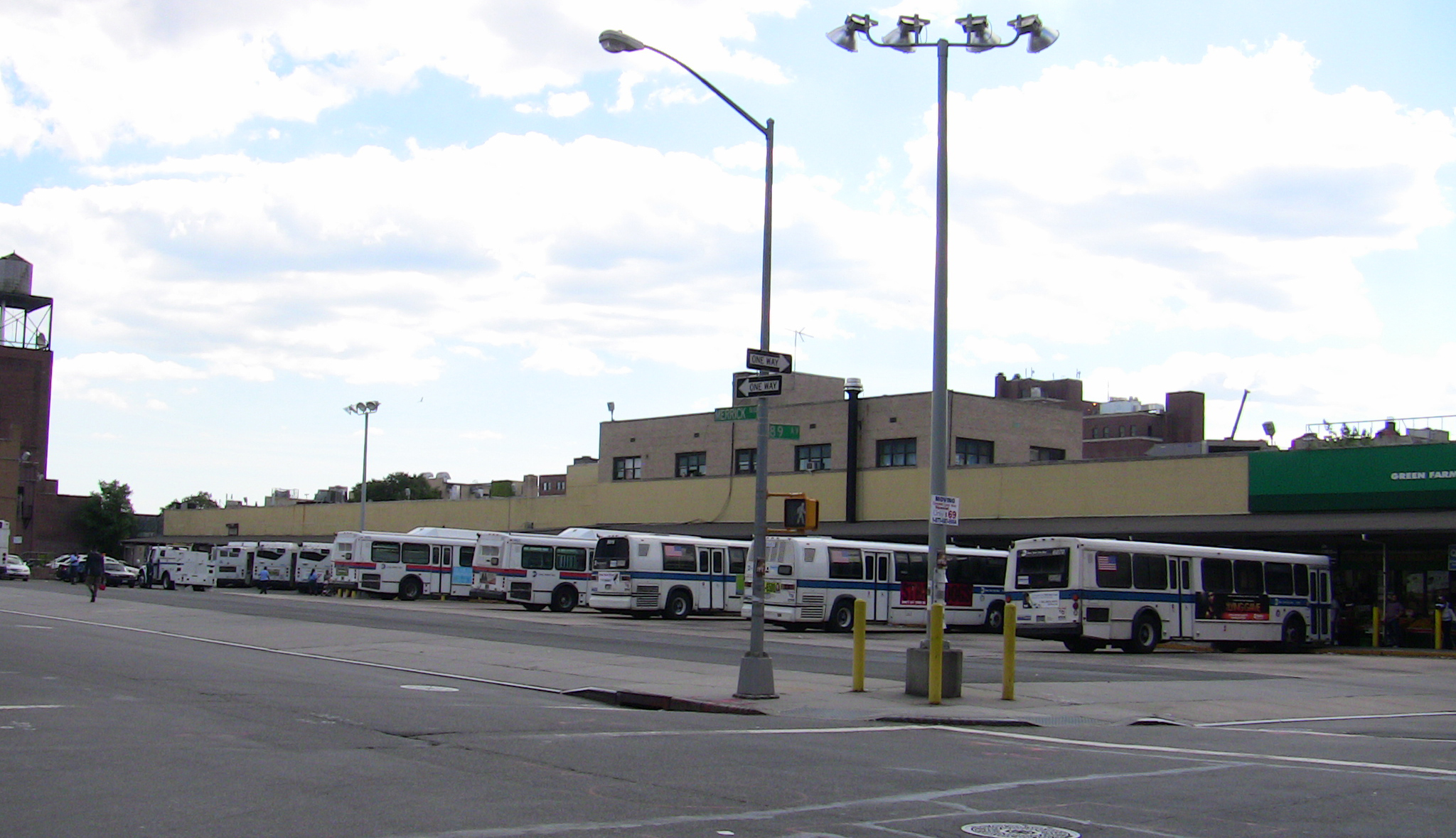
- An Orion VII OG, two Orion VII NGs, two Long Island Orion Vs, two RTSs and an NYCT Orion V at 165th Street Terminal, viewed from Merrick Boulevard & 89th Avenue

General information
- Location: 89-21 165th Street (at 89th Avenue and Merrick Boulevard); Queens, New York City; United States
- System: New York City bus station
- Owner: FBE Limited
- Operator: NYCT, MTA Bus, Nassau Inter-County Express
- Bus routes: 11 local MTA routes, 5 NICE Bus routes
- Bus stands: 23 Loading Bays
- Connections: New York City Subway: at 169th Street at Jamaica Center–Parsons/Archer Long Island Rail Road; AirTrain JFK at Jamaica (Sutphin Blvd)

Construction
- Structure type: At-grade

History
- Opened: August 11, 1936
- Closed: June 1, 2025
- Former names: Long Island Bus Terminal
Location

The 165th Street Bus Terminal, also known as Jamaica Bus Terminal, the Long Island Bus Terminal (the name emblazoned on the entranceway's red tiles), Jamaica−165th Street Terminal (as signed on buses towards the terminal), or simply 165th Street Terminal, was a major bus terminal in Jamaica, Queens, New York City. Owned by FBE Limited, the terminal served both NYCT and MTA Bus lines as well as NICE Bus lines to Nassau County, and was a hub to Green Bus Lines prior to MTA takeover. It was located at 89th Avenue and Merrick Boulevard, near the Queens Public Library's main branch. Most buses that pass through Jamaica served either this terminal, the Jamaica Center subway station at Parsons Boulevard, or the LIRR station at Sutphin Boulevard.

Unlike other major bus centers in New York City, there was no direct subway transfer available to the terminal. The closest subway station was 169th Street on Hillside Avenue served by the F and <F> train. Most buses traveling to/from the east, which operate via Hillside Avenue, also stop at 179th Street served by the E, F, and <F> trains.

== History ==
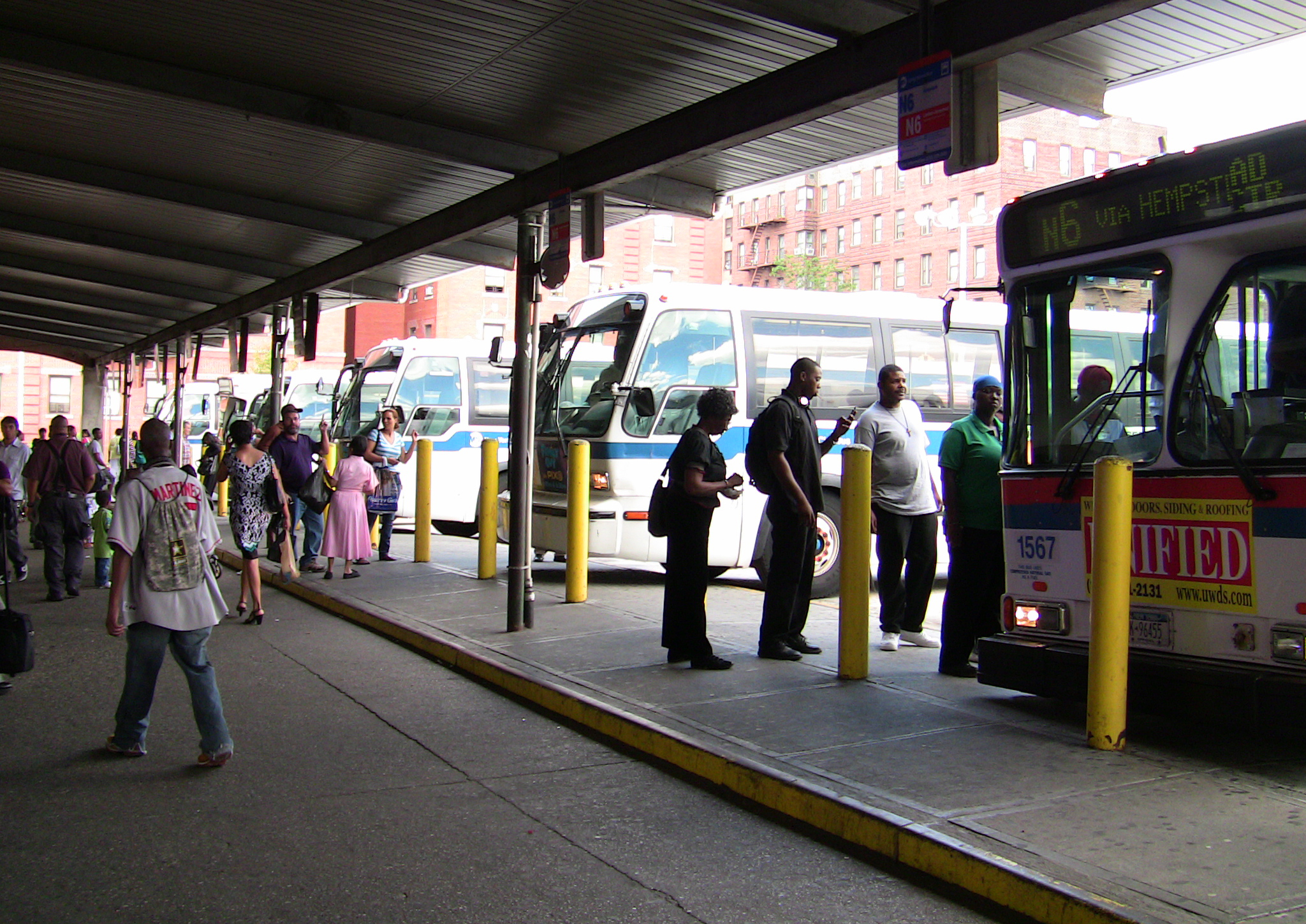
Passengers board a 2000 Orion V CNG (1567) on the Hempstead-bound N6 under Long Island Bus, an Orion VII OG, and four RTSs at the terminal.

Construction on the "Long Island Bus Terminal" began in 1930, built by the Shore Road Development Company, Inc. with the intent of expanding transit service to and from Long Island. On August 11, 1936, Bee-Line, Inc. (one of the predecessors to the Nassau Inter-County Express) opened the terminal, operating routes from the terminal to the rest of Jamaica and Southeast Queens, and to Nassau County. It replaced the company's former terminal − the Jamaica Union Bus Terminal − at Jamaica Avenue and New York Boulevard (now Guy R. Brewer Boulevard), which was taken over by Green Bus Lines. The new terminal, which cost $1.5 million to build, featured a waiting room, lounge, and ticket offices. The bus terminal was enclosed by two one-story buildings on 165th Street and Merrick Boulevard respectively. Upon opening, the terminal served the BMT Jamaica Line's nearby terminal at 168th Street and Jamaica Avenue, and would serve the IND Queens Boulevard Line's 169th Street station on Hillside Avenue upon its completion in 1937. In May 1939, Bee-Line relinquished its Queens routes; these routes began operation from the terminal under North Shore Bus Company (a predecessor to the NYCT bus operations) on June 25, 1939.

In March 1947, North Shore Bus would be taken over by the New York City Board of Transportation, making the bus routes from the terminal city operated. In 1952, the terminal was purchased by the Jamaica Realty Corporation, and in 1953 the New York City Transit Authority (today part of the MTA) took over operations of the terminal from the Board of Transportation. The terminal would later be served by the Green Bus Lines company (predecessor to the JFK Depot-based MTA Bus Company lines). Following the closure of the 168th Street station in 1977, the bus terminal lost its only direct subway connection.

As originally built, the terminal had only one entry point, on its north side from 89th Avenue. At some point, the structure on Merrick Boulevard was removed, allowing buses to turn directly onto the street or into the terminal.

== 168th Street Bus Terminal ==
In January 2023, the 165th Street Bus Terminal was sold to a developer and planned to become a mixed-use facility, with the lease for the terminal expiring in September 2023, with an alternative location at a nearby parking lot planned to be the location of the new terminal. The new 168th Street Bus Terminal, located approximately two blocks away at 90-01 168th Street, is temporary until the MTA can find a permanent location. The new terminal opened on June 1, 2025.

== List of routes ==
The terminal served seven routes operated by MTA New York City Bus, four operated by MTA Bus Company, and six operated by Nassau Inter-County Express (NICE; formerly MTA Long Island Bus). All terminated here, except for the Q17, which is a through route. The southbound Q17 bus stopped outside the terminal on Merrick Boulevard, while the northbound Q17 to Flushing stopped on 168th Street, one block east.

Bay	Route	Operator	Destination	Main streets traveled	Service/historical notes
1	Q82	NYCT	Belmont Park Racetrack	Hillside Avenue, Hempstead Avenue	
2	Q82	NYCT	Belmont Park Racetrack	Hillside Avenue, Hempstead Avenue	
3	Q76	NYCT	College Point	Hillside Avenue, Francis Lewis Boulevard (north), 14th Avenue	Extended to the terminal in 1989
4	Q77	NYCT	Springfield Gardens	Hillside Avenue, Francis Lewis Boulevard (south), Springfield Boulevard	Extended to the terminal in 1989
5	Q3	NYCT	JFK Airport Lefferts Boulevard AirTrain station	Hillside Avenue, Farmers Boulevard	
6	Q36	NYCT	Little Neck	Hillside Avenue, Jamaica Avenue, Little Neck Parkway	
7	Q2	NYCT	UBS Arena/Belmont Park	Hillside Avenue, Hollis Avenue	
8	n6	NICE	Hempstead Transit Center	Hempstead Turnpike	Formerly operated by Long Island Bus; all trips operating n6X express stop outside the terminal on Merrick Boulevard.; n6X express service to HTC, weekday rush hours only
9	n6	NICE	Hempstead Transit Center	Hempstead Turnpike	Formerly operated by Long Island Bus; all trips operating n6X express stop outside the terminal on Merrick Boulevard.; n6X express service to HTC, weekday rush hours only
10	n22, n22X	NICE	Hicksville LIRR station	Hillside Avenue, Westbury Avenue, Prospect Avenue, West John Street	Formerly operated by Long Island Bus; Weekday service ends at Mineola Intermodal Center, other times ends at Hicksville; Express Service Terminates at Roosevelt Field Mall
11	n22, n22X	NICE	Hicksville LIRR station	Hillside Avenue, Westbury Avenue, Prospect Avenue, West John Street	Formerly operated by Long Island Bus; Weekday service ends at Mineola Intermodal Center, other times ends at Hicksville; Express Service Terminates at Roosevelt Field Mall
12	n24	NICE	Hicksville LIRR station	Jamaica Avenue, Jericho Turnpike, Old Country Road	Formerly operated by Long Island Bus; Open-door in Queens from 239th Street to the Nassau County line.; Most service ends at Roosevelt Field Mall, some weekend early morning and late evening trips run fully to Hicksville
13	n1	NICE	Green Acres Mall; Hewlett	Hempstead Turnpike, Elmont Road	Formerly operated by Long Island Bus; Weekday rush hours peak direction only (departs PM)
13	n26	NICE	Great Neck LIRR station	Hillside Avenue, Lakeville Road, Community Drive	Formerly operated by Long Island Bus; Weekday rush hours peak direction only (departs AM)
14	Q6	MTA Bus	JFK Airport (cargo area)	Sutphin Boulevard, Rockaway Boulevard	Formerly operated by Green Bus Lines; Extended to the terminal in 1989; Does not serve passenger terminals
15	Q6	MTA Bus	JFK Airport (cargo area)	Sutphin Boulevard, Rockaway Boulevard	Formerly operated by Green Bus Lines; Extended to the terminal in 1989; Does not serve passenger terminals
16	Q6	MTA Bus	JFK Airport (cargo area)	Sutphin Boulevard, Rockaway Boulevard	Formerly operated by Green Bus Lines; Extended to the terminal in 1989; Does not serve passenger terminals
17	Q8	MTA Bus	Spring Creek, Brooklyn	101st Avenue	Formerly operated by Green Bus Lines; Extended to the terminal in 1989
18	Q8	MTA Bus	Spring Creek, Brooklyn	101st Avenue	Formerly operated by Green Bus Lines; Extended to the terminal in 1989
19	Q9	MTA Bus	South Ozone Park	Van Wyck Expwy Service Road, Lincoln Street	Formerly operated by Green Bus Lines; Extended to the terminal in 1989
20	Q9	MTA Bus	South Ozone Park	Van Wyck Expwy Service Road, Lincoln Street	Formerly operated by Green Bus Lines; Extended to the terminal in 1989
21	Unused				
22	Q41	MTA Bus	Howard Beach	127th Street, 109th Avenue, Cross Bay Boulevard	Formerly operated by Green Bus Lines; Extended to the terminal in 1989
23	Q41	MTA Bus	Howard Beach	127th Street, 109th Avenue, Cross Bay Boulevard	Formerly operated by Green Bus Lines; Extended to the terminal in 1989

== 165th Street Mall ==
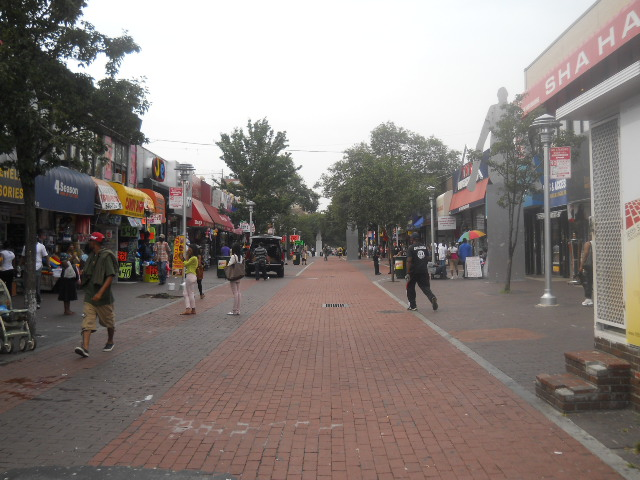
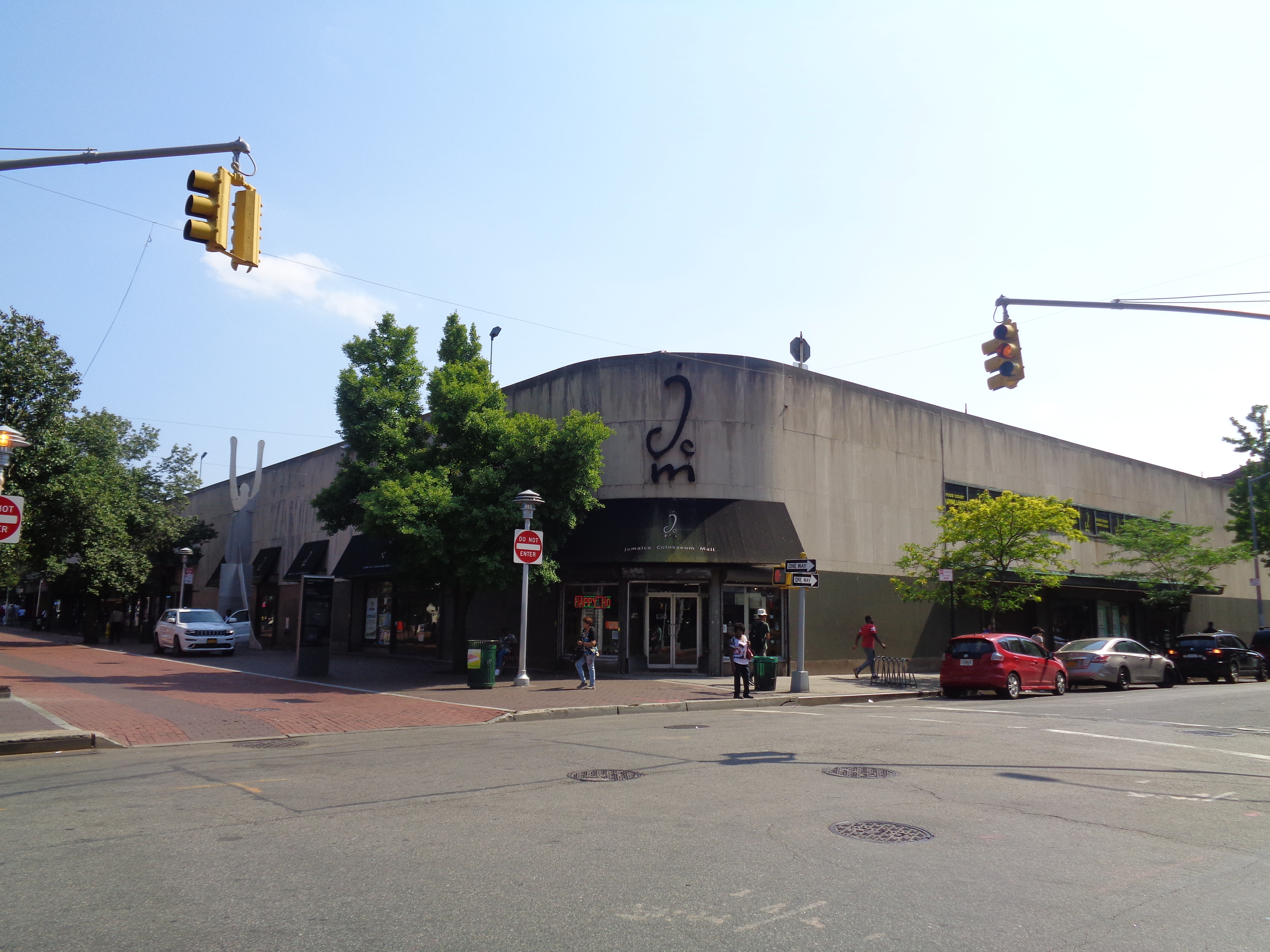
The 165th Street pedestrian mall (top), and the Jamaica Colosseum Mall (bottom).

Adjacent to the bus terminal is the 165th Street Mall, a pedestrian shopping mall running the entire length of 165th Street between 89th Avenue and Jamaica Avenue. Within the block are over 160 stores, including several apparel and footwear stores and a food court. The strip on 165th Street was originally constructed as part of the terminal, opening just after the terminal debuted in 1936. Shops were also built on 166th Street (today's Merrick Boulevard), but are not present today. In 1943 a massive fire damaged eleven stores along the strip, and a four-alarm fire in 1959 destroyed six shops and caused over $1 million in damage.

From 1947 to 1979, the mall housed a large Macy's location constructed by Robert D. Kohn, one of the department chain's first locations in Queens. The Macy's closed due to several issues, including the threat of burglary, the transition of Jamaica from a middle-class White neighborhood to a working class Black and immigrant neighborhood, and the closure and demolition of the BMT Jamaica Avenue El east of 121st Street that led many other businesses in the area to suffer.

In May 1979, 165th Street was redeveloped as a pedestrian mall, with the street closed to vehicular traffic and repaved with red brick. In May 1983, a third fire occurred damaging 12 stores.

One of the former attractions of the mall was the Jamaica Colosseum Mall, which took over the former Macy's building in 1984. The Colosseum is one of New York City's largest jewelry exchanges. It had over 120 merchants and jewelers, a rooftop parking lot, and housed the 165th Street Mall's food court. Several New York rappers including Jamaica native 50 Cent shopped in the Colosseum growing up, and music videos have been filmed at the facility.

Following the opening of the Archer Avenue Lines in 1988, merchants from the mall sued the NYCT due to the loss of business after the diversion of several bus lines to the new subway stations. The NYCT proceeded to extend the Q76 and Q77 from the 179th Street station, while Green Bus Lines added five bus routes to the terminal.

Jamaica Colosseum Mall closed permanently on January 31, 2026.

== Nearby points of interest ==
One block west of the terminal on 164th Street is the First Presbyterian Church, built in 1662. The Jamaica Main Post Office is located one block north of the church at 89th Avenue and 164th Street. The Queens Central Library and the Children's Library Discovery Center are located directly across Merrick Boulevard, as is the former Loew's Valencia Theatre (now the Tabernacle of Prayer Church) one block south. On the southeast corner of 165th Street and Jamaica Avenue, across from the mall, is the former control tower of the 168th Street station, rented by retail shops since the 1930s.

== See also ==
- List of bus routes in Queens
- List of bus routes in Nassau County, New York
- Fulton Mall
- Port Authority Bus Terminal
- George Washington Bridge Bus Terminal
- Rosa Parks Hempstead Transit Center
- Mineola Intermodal Center
