= Elmhurst Sculpture Garden =

Community garden in New York City

- Location within New York City
- Location: 59-59 92nd Street; Elmhurst, Queens, New York City
- Coordinates: 40.7335°N 73.8687°W
- Established: 2017
- Public transit: New York City Subway: Woodhaven Boulevard; New York City Bus: Q59, Q88; MTA Bus: Q11, Q21, Q29, Q38, Q52 SBS, Q53 SBS, Q60
- Website: https://www.elmhurstsculpturegarden.org/

Elmhurst Sculpture Garden is an outdoor community garden where artists can exhibit sculptures, multimedia installations, musical and dance performances. The garden is located one block away from the Queens Center Mall and near the Long Island Expressway in the neighborhood of Elmhurst, Queens, New York City. In addition to providing an arts exhibition space, the garden offers a community art program in collaborative sculpting.

== Description ==
Formally a vacant lot, the area was renovated by local artist Yvonne Shortt and a group of volunteers in 2017 in an effort to create an urban space where artists can display sculptures and multimedia art pieces. With additional funding provided by the Burning Man Global Arts Grant, Shortt and volunteers from the community were able to expand the public art space. In 2019, the garden was selected by RPGA Studio, a local art organization, to display several art installations funded by the National Endowment of the Arts, to address community issues in Elmhurst and Corona.

== List of works in Elmhurst Sculpture Garden ==
Elmhurst Sculpture Garden offers a space for local, regional, and national artists and performers to display various multimedia art installations, as well as musical and dance performances.

- Mayuko Fujino, Treeuphoria, 2019. (Paper Cut Art).
- Chemin Hsiao, Untitled, 2019. (Mural)
- Margaret Roleke, Shotgun Home (America), 2019. (Multimedia Sculpture).
- Yvonne Shortt, Waking Blind, 2018. (Sculpture).
- Christine Lee Tyler, Interlaced, 2019. (Multimedia Sculpture).
- The Moving Company, Whose Is A Place, 2019. (Dance).
