= Junction Boulevard =

Street in Queens, New York

Junction Blvd
- 94th Street
- Former name: Junction Avenue
- Owner: City of New York
- Maintained by: NYCDOT
- Length: 3.0 mi (4.8 km)
- Location: Queens, New York City
- South end: NY 25 (Queens Boulevard) in Rego Park
- Major junctions: I-495 (Long Island Expressway) in Corona; NY 25A (Northern Boulevard) in Jackson Heights; Grand Central Parkway in East Elmhurst
- North end: LaGuardia Airport in East Elmhurst

Junction Boulevard, originally Junction Avenue, is a two-mile north-south route that runs through the neighborhoods of Jackson Heights, Corona, Elmhurst, and Rego Park in Queens, New York City, United States. It continues as 94th Street in East Elmhurst and also serves LaGuardia Airport.

== Route description ==
94th Street begins at LaGuardia Airport, running south through the East Elmhurst neighborhood. Upon intersecting 32nd Avenue, it continues as Junction Boulevard. Along its route, it intersects with the following major roads: Grand Central Parkway, Astoria Boulevard, Roosevelt Avenue, Corona Avenue, Long Island Expressway, with its southern end at Queens Boulevard. Junction Boulevard passes by the LeFrak City apartment development and the Rego Center Mall, ending at Queens Boulevard. For most of its length, its width varies from two to four lanes.

== Transportation ==
The following bus routes serve Junction Boulevard:

- The entire length of 94th Street south of LaGuardia Road and Junction Boulevard is followed by the Q72 bus. Service to Rego Park is absent south of 62nd Drive.
- The Q88 runs between Horace Harding Expressway and either 57th Avenue (Elmhurst) or 59th Avenue (Queens Village). Service north of 59th Avenue is supplemented by the East Elmhurst-bound Q14.
- At Horace Harding Expressway, the Rego Park-bound Q59 terminates, continuing out of service to 62nd Drive.

The following bus routes run on 94th Street:

- The Glendale-bound Q47 runs from Ditmars Boulevard to 23rd Avenue.
- The LaGuardia Airport-bound M60 SBS runs from 23rd Avenue to LaGuardia Road and is supplemented by the LaGuardia Airport-bound Q70 SBS north of Ditmars Boulevard. Both buses then head back on 94th Street to its northern end to get to their opposite terminals.
- The Flushing-bound Q90 runs from Runway Drive to Ditmars Boulevard, after heading north from LaGuardia Road to make a U-turn.

Junction Boulevard contains two New York City Subway stations:

- Junction Boulevard station on the IRT Flushing Line (7 and <7> trains)
- 63rd Drive–Rego Park station on the IND Queens Boulevard Line (E, F, M, and R trains)
