= Rego Center =

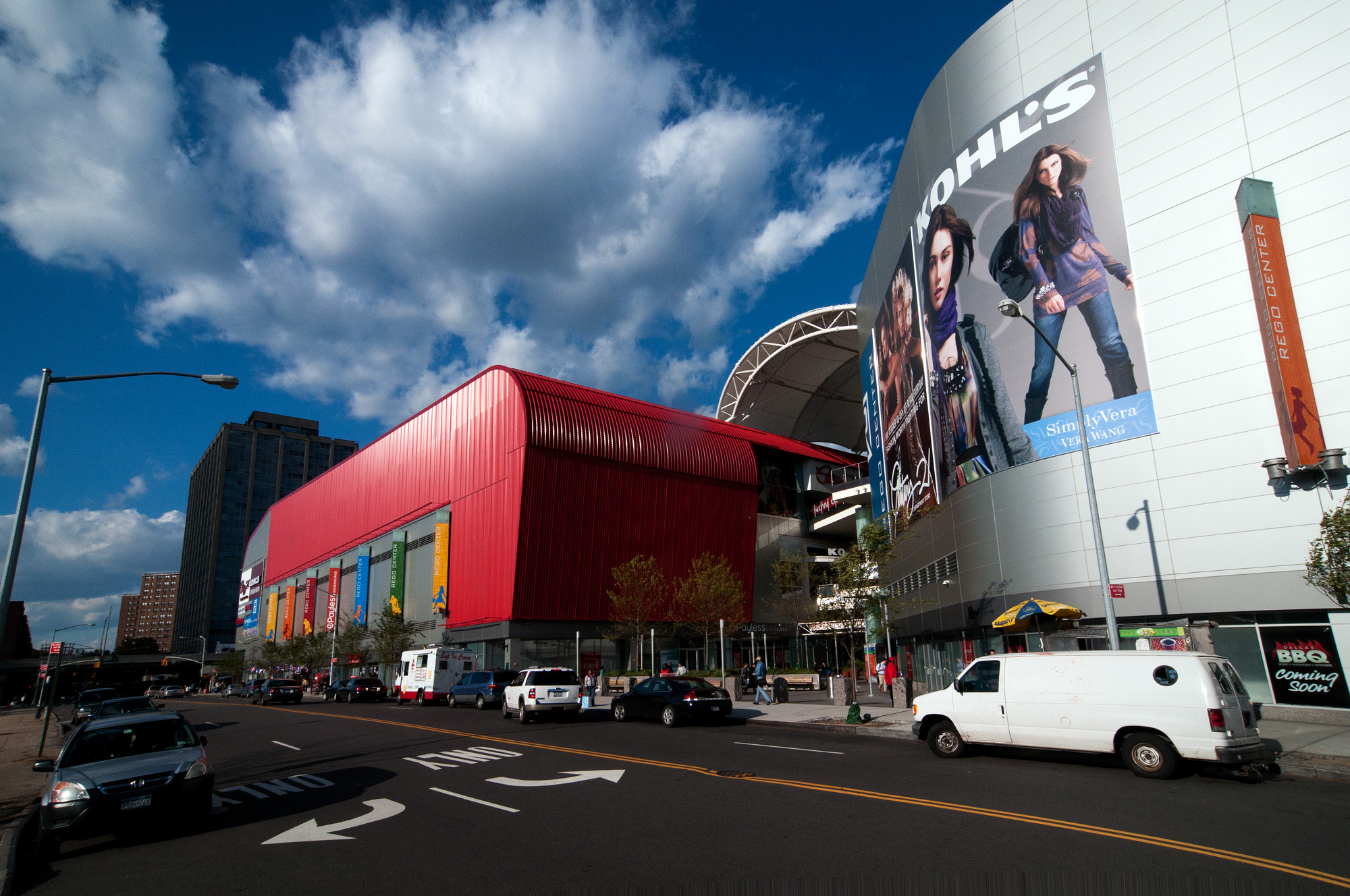
- Rego Center Phase II
- Location: Queens, New York, United States
- Coordinates: 40°43′59″N 73°51′47″W
- Address: 6135 Junction Boulevard; Rego Park, NY 11374
- Opened: March 3, 2010; 16 years ago
- Developer: Vornado Realty Trust
- Manager: Vornado Realty Trust
- Owner: Alexander’s, Inc
- Architect: Ehrenkrantz Eckstut & Kuhn Architects
- Num. of anchor tenants: 5
- Floor area: 270,000 square feet (25,000 m^{2}) (Phase I); 950,000 square feet (88,000 m^{2}) (Phase II)
- Floors: 4
- Parking: 1,400
- Public transit: New York City Subway: at 63rd Drive–Rego Park; New York City Bus: Q38, Q59, Q88; MTA Bus: Q60, Q72
- Website: regocenter.com

Rego Center is a shopping mall bordered by the Long Island Expressway, Junction Boulevard, Queens Boulevard, 63rd Road, and 97th Street in the Rego Park neighborhood of Queens in New York City.

== History ==
The property was originally the only Queens location of Alexander's, a New York City department store. Caldor had bought up the location and was in the processes of opening their store in the fall of 1995 but those plans were stalled when the chain filed for bankruptcy that year. Sears later opened in 1996.

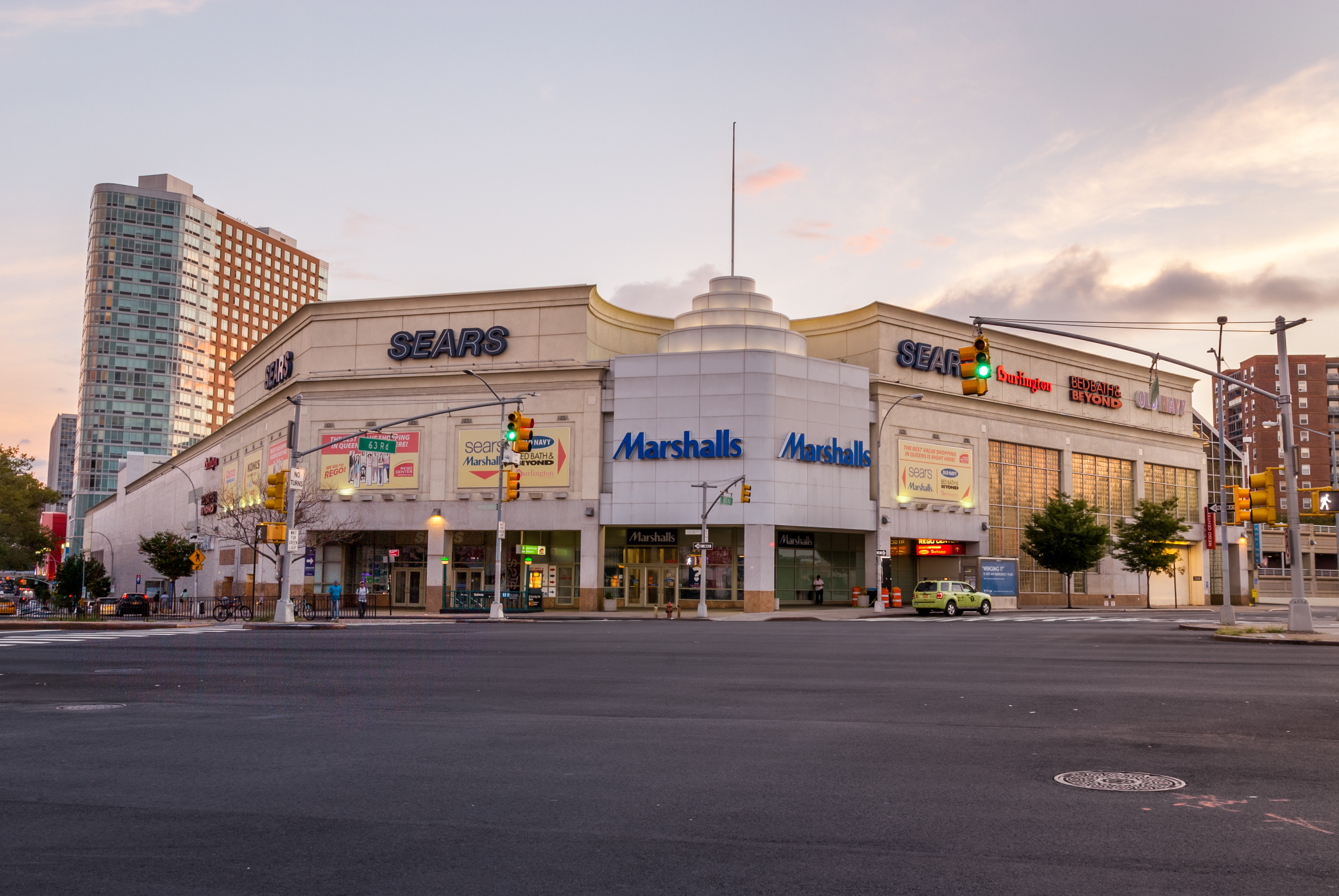
Now closed Phase I

Retailers also included Bed Bath and Beyond, Marshalls, Old Navy and Burlington Coat Factory in Phase I. Phase II of the mall, which was initially intended as an annex to the now closed Phase I, opened on March 3, 2010 with 950,000 square feet (88,000 m^{2}) of retail space. Costco, Century 21, Kohl's, Panera Bread, Toys "R" Us and T.J. Maxx were its original tenants. An Aldi supermarket also opened on level 1 in February 2011, with a Staples opening next door in November 2011.

In July 2015, Vornado Realty Trust, the mall's developer and manager, opened a 24-story, 314-unit residential tower named The Alexander on top of the mall's phase II, due to a surge in young professionals moving into the area. About 20% of the units are studio apartments, with the rest being one- and two-bedroom apartments.

By the end of 2016, Staples had closed their store in Rego Center. The site was later filled with a Petco in February 2017.

On January 4, 2017, it was announced that Sears would be closing as part of a plan to close 150 stores nationwide. The store closed in April 2017. A year later, in March 2018, Toys "R" Us announced that it would close all of its US stores, including the location at Rego Center. The site was then occupied by a toy store called Toy City, operated by Party City.

On January 13, 2019, Kohl's announced that its store at Rego Center would be closing along with 3 other stores nationwide. The store closed on April 13, 2019.

In September 2019, IKEA announced plans to convert the former Sears into its third New York City location. It opened on January 11, 2021. The IKEA store was severely damaged during Hurricane Ida in September 2021. On October 26, 2022, it was announced that IKEA would be closing this location on December 3. IKEA bought out its lease at Rego Center in February 2024.

On April 24, 2020, it was announced that At Home would be opening in the former Kohl's space in 2021. At Home opened in April 2021.

On September 10, 2020, it was announced that Century 21 would be closing its location as part of a plan to close all 38 stores nationwide. One month later, Century 21 permanently closed its Rego Park store.

On April 23, 2023, Bed Bath & Beyond announced that they filed for Chapter 11 Bankruptcy, and announced that they would close all remaining stores in the United States, including the location at Rego Center. The store closed in July 2023.

After several years at the mall, Old Navy closed in January 2024.

Recently, as of April 27, 2025, Best Buy has moved inside of the former Toys "R" Us space, which has been vacant since 2018. Best Buy relocated from the nearby Queens Place Mall. In addition, DSW also relocated from Queens Place Mall into a portion of the former Century 21 space in September 2025.

On May 15, 2025, Marshalls relocated to the Phase II building. Following that on June 16, At Home announced that they filed for Chapter 11 Bankruptcy, and announced that they would close 26 stores nationwide, including the location at Rego Center. The store closed on August 24, 2025. Later in September, Burlington relocated to Phase II of the mall leaving Phase I of the mall vacant.

In June 2026, Target announced the relocating from Queens Place Mall (the same mall Best Buy relocated from) into the former Kohl's/At Home space. This will take place in 2028.

=== Withdrawals ===
The Home Depot withdrew from the rental deal with Vornado in late 2008 due to drop in profit. The space vacated by Home Depot was replaced by Costco. This is Costco's fifth location in New York City and second in Queens.

In 2005, Walmart had been dropped as a potential tenant, as an early part of its bid to open a store within New York City. Opposition by various groups killed the plan.
