= Triboro Coach =

Defunct bus company in New York City

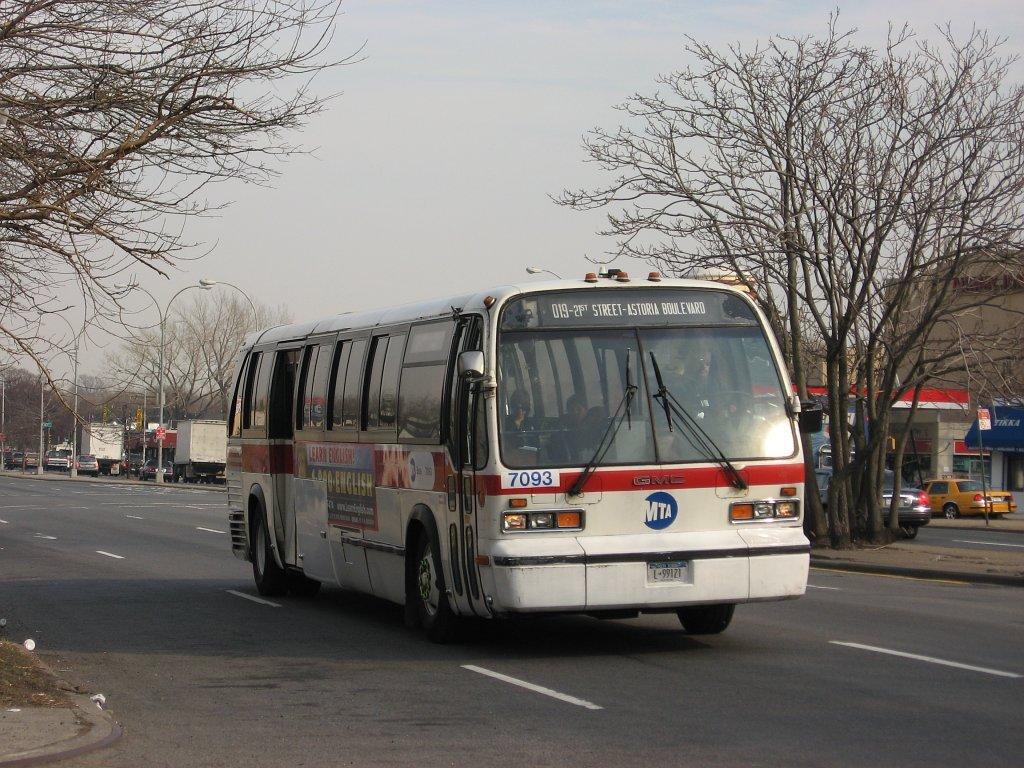
- A former Triboro Coach bus under MTA operations on the Q19 route, the company's original service.
- Parent: GTJ Reit Incorporated
- Founded: 1931
- Defunct: 2006
- Headquarters: 85-01 24th Avenue; East Elmhurst, NY 11370-1694

Triboro Coach Corporation was a bus company in New York City, United States, operating local service in Queens and express routes to Manhattan until February 20, 2006, when MTA Bus took over all of its bus operations and services.

== History ==
Salvatore Fornatora began operating buses in Queens in April 1919 as the Woodside-Astoria Transportation Company, with his first route, the eastern part of today's Q19 route connecting the 103rd Street-Corona Plaza station on the recently opened Corona Line in Corona with Flushing. In 1928, the Corona terminal was extended westward, and moved to Astoria - 21st Street, completing the original formation of today's Q19 Astoria Boulevard bus route, when the Corona Line was extended to Flushing. The company was operating several other routes in the Astoria-Woodside-Maspeth area by 1930.

The new Triboro Coach Corporation was incorporated on April 10, 1931, running the Q18 and Q24 routes. On September 24, 1936, it acquired a city franchise for nine routes in northwestern Queens (the "Long Island City zone"). Triboro acquired the Q23 from the North Shore Bus Company, the Q29 from Kings Coach Company, the Q33 from Municipal Motor Bus Company, the Q38 from Affiliated Bus Transit Corporation, and the Q39 from National City Lines. After World War II during October 1947, Triboro was acquired by the stockholders of Green Bus Lines, after financial difficulties, but continued to operate independently. Its depot in East Elmhurst was opened on January 15, 1954. Major expansions were made in 1956 with an express bus route (now the Q53) between Woodside and Rockaway Park (replacing the Long Island Rail Road's Rockaway Beach Branch, out of service since 1950) and in 1961, when it acquired the Q72 (then the B72) from the New York City Transit Authority. Five express routes to Manhattan were initiated in the 1970s and 1980s: the QM10 & QM11 in 1970, QM12 in 1971, and QM22, QM24, and QM24W in June 1988. Triboro was the first private company in the city to initiate express operations with the Q53 Woodside-Rockaway Park Express bus line in 1956, at the request of the City of New York due to the loss of direct LIRR Rockaway service from Woodside.

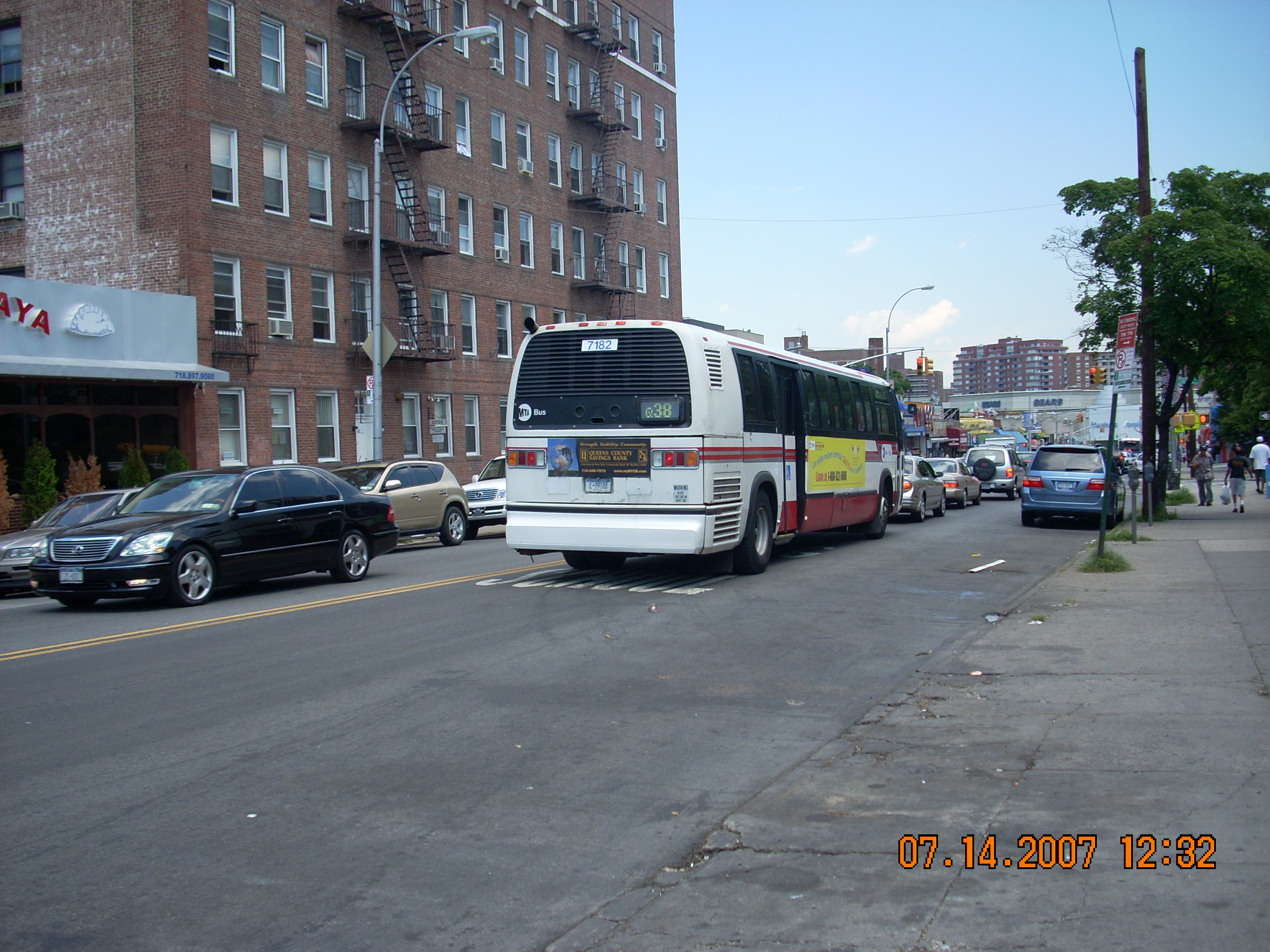
Rear view of an MTA Bus Company bus on the Q38 route with Triboro Coach livery

In addition to diesel powered buses, Triboro housed a Methanol, and compressed natural gas (CNG) fueling facility, along with several CNG powered buses at its final facility in East Elmhurst. The methanol fuel station was installed in 1989 for six General Motors-built methanol buses. In the early 1990s, three Triboro-operated RTS buses were fitted with special Detroit Diesel Series 92 engines that ran on methanol provided by Air Products & Chemicals. CNG fueling was installed in 1994 to be used for orders of TMC RTS-06 CNG buses and later Orion V CNG buses that were ordered in conjunction with identical buses used by Command Bus Company and Queens Surface Corporation (now Spring Creek Depot and College Point Depot respectively).

On February 20, 2006, the operations of Triboro Coach were taken over by the Metropolitan Transportation Authority (MTA) under the MTA Bus Company brand, the final part of the city's takeover of all the remaining subsidized privately operated bus routes. As part of the takeover, the former Triboro Coach garage became the LaGuardia Depot. However, the facility was severely damaged in April 2006 (only 2 months after the MTA Takeover) following an explosion within one of the natural gas lines and destroyed a former Triboro/ ex-Jamaica Bus RTS-04 (see below). All of the ex-Triboro CNG buses were transferred to Spring Creek and College Point Depots and ran from there up until their retirement.

== Bus routes ==
Just prior to MTA Bus takeover, Triboro Coach operated the following routes. Most of these continue to be based out of the company's former facility in East Elmhurst.

Route	Terminal A	Major streets of travel	Terminal B	Notes
Queens Local
Q18	Astoria	30th Avenue, 58th Street, Woodside Avenue, 65th Place, 69th Street	Maspeth	Formerly Steinway Transit Corporation Flushing Line; Q18 Astoria-Woodside and Q24 Woodside-Maspeth; combined into Q18; Streamlined in Maspeth on August 31, 2025.
Q19	Astoria	via Astoria Boulevard	Flushing	Salvatore Fornatora's original bus route from Corona into Flushing formed during April 1919.; Was at College Point Depot from 2010-2014 and again from 2017-2025.
Q19A	Long Island City	21st Street, Ditmars Boulevard	Jackson Heights	Originally ran from Queens Plaza to the Astoria–Ditmars Boulevard El station; Renumbered to Q69 in 2008; Truncated from Court Square to Queens Plaza on August 31, 2025.
Q19B	Jackson Heights	35th Avenue, 35th Avenue, 89th/90th Streets, Astoria Boulevard	East Elmhurst	Renumbered to Q49 in 2008
Q23	East Elmhurst	108th Street	Forest Hills	Acquired in 1936 from North Shore Bus Company.; Was at College Point Depot from 2017-2025.; Rerouted from 102nd-104th Streets to 108th Street north of Roosevelt Avenue in 2025.
Q29	Jackson Heights	80th Street	Glendale	Acquired in 1936 from Kings Coach Company; Transferred to NYCT on June 29, 2025.
Q33	Jackson Heights	82nd/83rd Streets, 23rd Avenue, 94th Street	LaGuardia Airport Central Terminal	Acquired in 1936 from Municipal Motorbus Company via 82nd/83rd Streets; Shortened to Ditmars Boulevard in 2013 due to new Q70 to LaGuardia Airport; Northern terminus rerouted to LGA Airport’s Marine Air Terminal on August 31, 2025.
Q38	Middle Village	Eliot and Penelope Avenues	Rego Park: or -; Corona	Acquired in 1936 from Affiliated Bus Transit Corporation.; Was at College Point Depot from 2010-2025.; Transferred to NYCT with Eliot Avenue portion removed on June 29, 2025.
Q39	Long Island City	Forest Avenue	Ridgewood	Acquired in 1936 from National City Bus Lines; Transferred to NYCT with northern terminus rerouted to Queens Plaza on June 29, 2025.
Q45	Jackson Heights	69th Street	Middle Village; Juniper Valley Park	Extended to Atlas Park Mall in 2008.; Merged into an extended Q47 in 2011.
Q45X	Rego Park; Woodhaven & Queens Boulevards / Rego Center: or -; Corona; 98th Street and 60th Avenue	Eliot Avenue	Middle Village; 69th Street	Established in 1943; Q45X short for "Q45 Extension".; This later became the first version of Q50; then part of Q38.; Replaced by Q14 on June 29, 2025.
Q47	Jackson Heights	69th Street and 80th Street	LaGuardia Airport; Marine Air Terminal	Extended to Atlas Park Mall via former Q45 route in 2011.; Northern terminus rerouted to Ditmars Boulevard via 23rd Avenue on August 31, 2025.
Q53	Woodside	Woodhaven Boulevard, Cross Bay Boulevard, Rockaway Beach Boulevard	Rockaway Park	Originally created as a replacement for the partially abandoned Long Island Rail Road Rockaway Beach Branch in 1950.; Was named the "Rockaway Park Express," despite the fact that technically, it was never a true express bus.; Was at College Point Depot from 2014-2017.; Rebranded as a “Limited” route upon MTA takeover; “Select Bus Service” since 2017.
Q72	Rego Park	Junction Boulevard	LaGuardia Airport	Originally the North Beach and Junction Boulevard trolley lines in 1894; Acquired in 1961 from New York City Transit Authority.
Queens-Manhattan express
QM10	Midtown Manhattan	Manhattan: 3rd Avenue branch: 34th Street, 3rd Avenue, 57th Street; 6th Avenue branch: 34th Street, 6th Avenue, 57th Street; Queens: Queens Boulevard, Linden Boulevard, 63rd Road, 57th Avenue	Lefrak City	LeFrak City Express; Former 3rd Avenue service relabeled QM40 in early September 2016
QM11	Financial District; Wall Street	Manhattan: Water Street, Church Street via 3rd Avenue or 6th Avenue; Queens: Queens Boulevard, 63rd Road, 57th Avenue	Lefrak City	Former downtown branch of the QM10; Queens trips streamlined via Yellowstone Boulevard in Forest Hills on June 30, 2025.
QM12	Midtown Manhattan	Manhattan: 3rd Avenue, 34th Street, 6th Avenue, 57th Street; Queens: Queens Boulevard, Yellowstone Boulevard	Forest Hills; Woodhaven Boulevard/Union Turnpike	Forest Hills Express; Stops east of 71 Avenue in Forest Hills discontinued in January 2011.; Third Avenue service was split off into QM42 in September 2016.; Truncated to Metropolitan Avenue/71st Road on June 30, 2025.
QM22	Midtown Manhattan	Manhattan: 3rd Avenue branch: 3rd Avenue, 59th Street; 6th Avenue branch: 34th Street, 6th Avenue, 57th Street; Queens: 21st Street, 21st Avenue, Ditmars Boulevard	Jackson Heights	Jackson Heights Express; Discontinued in June 2010, due to budget crisis
QM24	Midtown Manhattan	Manhattan: 8th Avenue or 3rd Avenue; Queens: Queens Boulevard	Glendale; Myrtle Avenue and 73rd Street	Glendale Express.; Eighth Avenue service rerouted to Sixth Avenue during MTA takeover.; Third Avenue service relabeled to QM34 in September 2016.
QM24W	Financial District; Wall Street	Manhattan: 23rd Street, Madison Avenue, 57th Street; Queens: Queens Boulevard	Glendale; Myrtle Avenue and 73rd Street	Glendale - Wall Street Express; Operated as QM24 under MTA takeover; Renumbered as QM25 in June 2010

Triboro also operated the Q57 express bus from Queensbridge at 21st Street and 41st Avenue to LaGuardia Airport in 1990. Nicknamed the "QT (Quick Trip) LaGuardia Express" bus route, it was discontinued in May 1991 due to lower than expected ridership. The service ran every 20 minutes, getting to the airport in 25 minutes, and stopping at all terminals. The route travelled via 21st Street and Astoria Boulevard to get to the airport. Service ran from 21st Street between 6 a.m. and 11 p.m. and from LaGuardia between 6:35 a.m. and 11 p.m.. The fare was $5, in addition to the $1.15 subway fare. The buses had luggage racks, air conditioning and padded seats.

== Depots ==
=== Astoria depot ===
The company's first garage was located at 29-28 Vernon Boulevard or 23-29/29-23 Vernon Boulevard, at Vernon Boulevard and Main Avenue (Astoria Boulevard) in Astoria, Queens, on the eastern shore of the East River near the western terminal of the company's Q19 route. The one-story brick building covered 12,000 square feet (1,100 m^{2}), and served as the company's main repair shops.

On July 19, 1926, an explosion and fire occurred in the garage's basement, leading to the death of a teenage employee. The facility was condemned by the city in the 1940s to construct the Astoria Houses public housing project, which remains there today.

40.772140°N 73.933223°W

=== Woodside depots ===
Triboro Coach simultaneously operated two garages in Woodside, Queens, in addition to its Astoria depot. The first was located at the southwest corner of Queens Boulevard and 51st Street, south of the 52nd Street subway station and adjacent to the New Calvary Cemetery. It was leased in 1939. The second was located at 69-01 35th Road or 65-10 35th Avenue, on a block bound by 65th Street to the west, 35th Avenue to the north, 69th Street to the east, and 35th Road to the south. It was located just north of the 65th Street subway station on Broadway. This 27,000 square feet (2,500 m^{2}) depot was leased in 1941. Both Woodside depots were condemned by the city in 1947. The second site at 65th Street was condemned for the construction of the Brooklyn–Queens Expressway (BQE). It closed in 1954, following eviction proceedings, replaced by the East Elmhurst location. The right-of-way of the BQE occupies the site today.

40.750330°N 73.897603°W

=== East Elmhurst depot ===
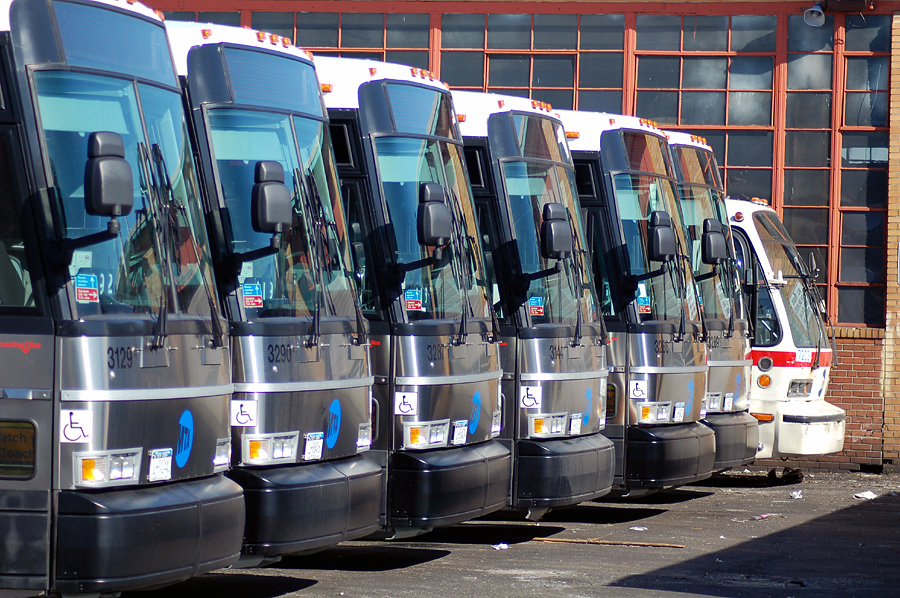
Some MCI buses and an RTS at LaGuardia Depot

Triboro Coach's final depot was located on a two-block long structure (85-01 24th Avenue) bound by 85th and 87th Street, and 23rd and 24th Avenues in the East Elmhurst & Jackson Heights neighborhoods of Queens, New York near LaGuardia Airport. The depot was opened on January 15, 1954, at the cost of $1 million. The 80,000 square feet (7,400 m^{2}) garage housed 130 buses, with additional space outdoors. The depot became MTA Bus' LaGuardia Depot on February 20, 2006.

In 1989, a methanol fuel station was installed at the facility for six General Motors-built RTS methanol buses. It was later used in the early 1990s to fuel a New York City Transit Authority demonstration bus from the Casey Stengel Depot and three new Triboro-operated RTS buses fitted with special Detroit Diesel Series 92 engines. Beginning in 1994, the facility dispatched compressed natural gas (CNG) buses in addition to its diesel fleet. Under the MTA, the depot was decommissioned from CNG operations in 2006 due to not meeting the MTA's safety and environmental standards. On April 10, 2006, while workers from KeySpan were removing CNG from tanks and a private contractor was conducting construction near the depot, a gas compressor station exploded leading to a large fire at the depot. One bus was destroyed and 12 were damaged.

40.766176°N 73.883474°W
