= Queens Place Mall =

Shopping mall in New York City

Queens Place
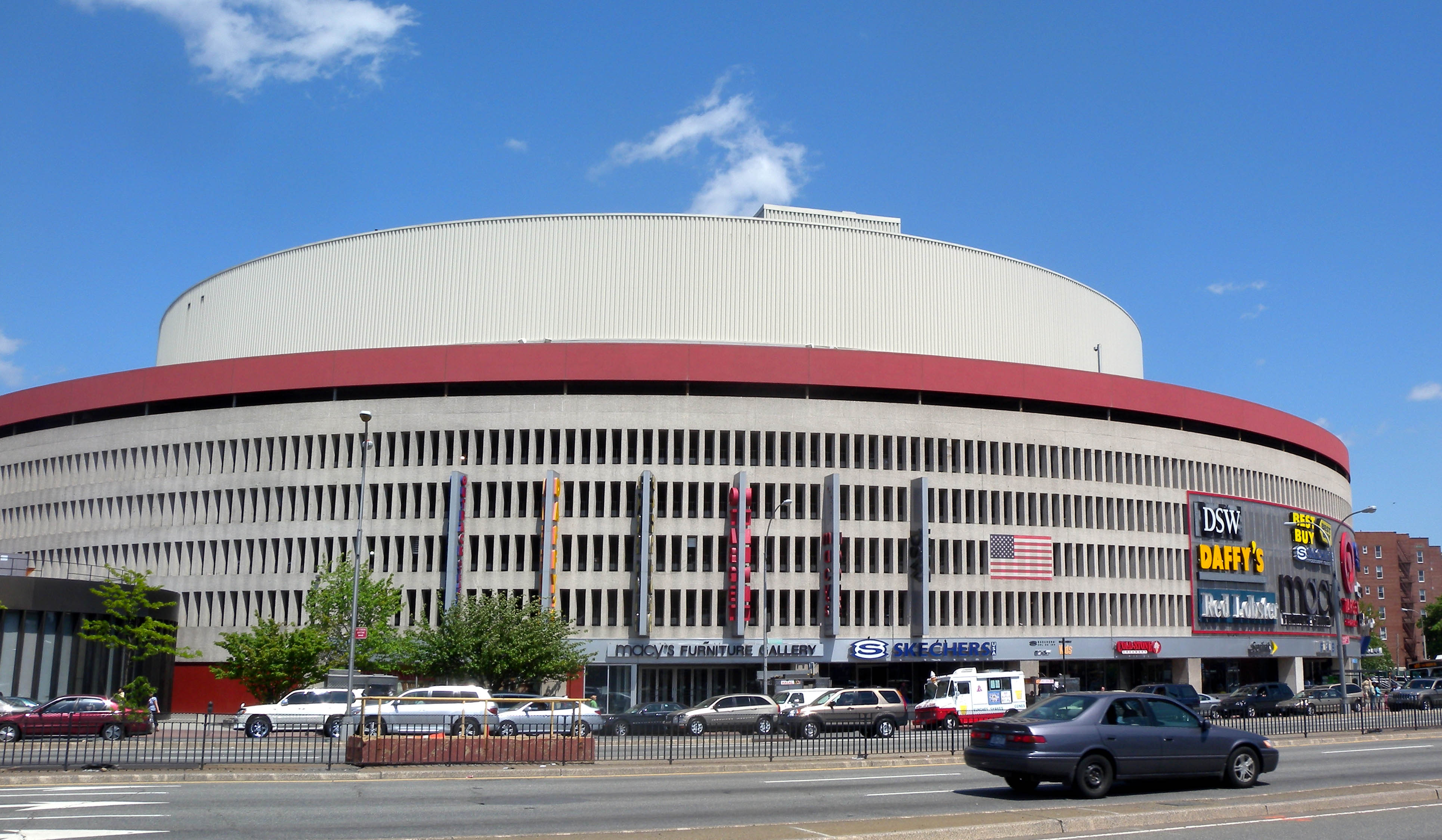
- Queens Place Mall in 2009
- Location: Elmhurst, New York
- Coordinates: 40.735743°N 73.874267°W
- Address: 88-01 Queens Boulevard
- Opened: October 11, 1965; 61 years ago
- Developer: R.H. Macy & Co.
- Manager: Madison International Realty
- Owner: Madison International Realty
- Architect: Skidmore, Owings & Merrill
- Num. of stores: 11
- Num. of anchor tenants: 3
- Floor area: 440,000 sq ft (41,000 m^{2})
- Floors: 5
- Parking: 6
- Public transit: New York City Subway: trains at Grand Avenue–Newtown; NYC Bus: Q53 SBS, Q58, Q59, Q60, Q98
- Website: shopqueensplace.com

Queens Place is an urban shopping mall in Elmhurst, Queens, New York City. Just northwest of the larger Queens Center, it is located on Queens Boulevard between 55th and 56th Avenues. The building was constructed in 1965 as Macy's and was designed by Skidmore, Owings & Merrill. It was later converted to Stern's, due to Macy's of Elmhurst moving into Queens Center, as part of Macy's dissolving of Abraham & Straus, in 1994, and then, as a result of Macy's dissolving Stern's in 2001, closed by Federated Department Stores. Today its flagship stores are Target, Macy's Furniture Gallery and Lidl, and it contains many smaller stores such as Mattress Firm and Skechers.

== History ==
R. H. Macy & Co. announced plans in 1964 to develop a circular Macy's department store on Queens Boulevard in Elmhurst, Queens, New York. The store, described in The New York Times as the "first of its kind" in the U.S., was to be a three-story building surrounded by five parking decks. The building was designed by architectural firm Skidmore, Owings & Merrill and erected by Walter Kidde Constructors. The 330,000-square-foot (31,000 m^{2}) building opened in 1965.

Macy's occupied the structure until 1995 and was replaced by Stern's, which moved out during 2000. Federated Department Stores, which owned both Macy's and Stern's, sold the building in May 2001 to Forest City Ratner, which added two floors and converted the building into the Queens Place Mall. On December 22, 2017, Queens Place was acquired by Madison International Realty from Forest City Realty Trust. The real estate private equity firm had previously acquired a 49% stake in the Forest City portfolio in 2011 and purchased the remaining 51% in 2017. French bank Natixis refinanced the property with a $100 million loan in April 2018.

On January 9, 2025, it was announced that Macy's Backstage (which had opened in 2015) would be closing as part of a plan to close 66 stores nationwide. This ended up not happening with the store making itself permanent instead. There also never were moves towards closing despite the plan, instead new items kept coming in and no closing sale ever happened.

In June 2026, Target announced the relocating of its location at the mall to Rego Center, a nearby mall where Best Buy (originally in this mall) also moved to. This will take place in 2028.

== Architecture and design ==
Queens Place is bounded by Queens Boulevard to the southwest, 56th Avenue to the south, 90th Street to the east, Justice Avenue to the northeast, and 55th Avenue to the north and northwest. The main entrance to the Queens Place Mall faces Queens Boulevard, while there is a parking garage entrance on 56th Avenue and 90th Street. Queens Center is one block southeast on Queens Boulevard, between 57th and 59th Avenues.

The building was originally planned to be completely round. However, Mary Sendek—the owner of the corner house at 55th Avenue and Queens Boulevard—held out and refused to sell the property, her childhood home. The mall was reconfigured with a small notch on one corner, to accommodate the air space associated with Sendek's property. Sendek continued to live in the small house until her death in 1980.

== Tenants ==
=== Current ===
- Target
- Macy's Furniture Gallery
- Macy's Backstage
- Lidl
- Cold Stone Creamery
- Mattress Firm
- Mrs. Fields
- Skechers
- Chipotle Mexican Grill
- Teriyaki One Japanese Grill
- Citibank

=== Former ===
- DSW
- Stern's
- Best Buy
- Red Lobster
- Outback Steakhouse
