= Yvonne Shortt =

American artist (born 1972)

- Born: December 5, 1972 (age 53); Queens, New York, US
- Known for: Installation art, sculpture
- Movement: Her Own
- Website: www.nycsocialpractice.com

Yvonne Shortt (born December 5, 1972, in Queens, New York) is a visually impaired African American question based installation artist. Her work encompasses illustration, installation, sculpture, painting, and photography. Shortt's work has been shown in museums, universities, farms, galleries, libraries, and public parks. Her work deals with various themes, including sustainability, equality, abundance, disability, community, and race. According to a New York Times documentary short that featured her, she left her previous career in financial algorithm programming and chose to focus on the arts after being diagnosed with retinitis pigmentosa.

== Education ==
Shortt holds a Master of Science - MS, Mathematics from New York University.

== Work ==
=== Be The Museum ===
In 2022, Shortt established a new kind of museum framework called Be The Museum. The framework consists of each artist being their own museum as they define the word, in this way the artist looks to take back the word museum from capitalists and wealthy people, re-centering it within the artist and community. The framework has been written about in several books and taught internationally at colleges.

=== Elmhurst Sculpture Garden ===
In 2017, Shortt established the Elmhurst Sculpture Garden in an abandoned parking lot in Elmhurst, Queens, New York with the help of local community volunteers and artists. With additional funding by the Burning Man Global Arts Grant in 2017 and the National Endowment of the Arts Grant in 2018, the community garden was able to expand in area space. Under Shortt's leadership, the garden serves as an arts incubator for artists to exhibit their pieces, as well as receive guidance in obtaining grants to revitalize public spaces in their communities.

=== African American Marbleization ===
An Act of Civil disobedience dating back to 2016, African American Marbleization is a series of guerrilla sculptures by Yvonne Shortt. It is the artist's response to oppression and racisms of African Americans in art, history, and her country. The pieces are cast in marble dust and installed outdoors as installations or small sculptures. The fragment pieces are also installed at universities including Queens College, Northeastern, New York University, and Marymount College. The work is also located at non profits including The Underground Railroad Museum, The Ely Center, and the Museum for Contemporary Artists. Other spaces include gardens, NYC Parks, and private collections.

=== Artistic Response to A.I.R. Gallery ===
Yvonne Shortt became a member of A.I.R. Gallery in January, 2021. Soon after in 2021, Ms. Shortt Co-found A.I.R. Gallery's Research and Development Committee with Daria Dorosh, founding member of A.I.R. Gallery. The committee seeks to make, model, and introduce new frameworks for artists; allowing artists to disrupt the scarcity mindset and patriarchal systems commonly encountered in the art world.

Ms. Shortt began working on an artistic response project that speaks to the personal difficulties experienced as an African American woman at A.I.R. Gallery after an incident where another member cautioned her about using rope and natural materials linking the materials to lynching.

=== Public art ===
==== Peppermint Pieces and Waking Blind ====
In 2018, Shortt produced two pieces inspired by her retinitis pigmentosa condition. She was selected to display one of her outdoor art installation pieces, Peppermint Pieces, as part of the Art in the Parks: Active Open Space initiative, which is funded by the Public Health in New York, Inc. on behalf of the New York City Department of Health and Mental Hygiene, in partnership with the City of New York Parks and Recreation. Peppermint Pieces is a multimedia piece made of wood and aluminum on display in Captain Tilly Park in Jamaica. Shortt's cement sculpture piece, Waking Blind, is also inspired by the artist's eye condition, which is displayed in Elmhurst Sculpture Garden.

==== Pavilion Landing ====
Shortt was among the recipients of the Art in the Parks: Alliance for Flushing Meadows Corona Park 2019 Grant to create an art installation that follows the theme, Flushing Meadows Corona Park: A Park for the Future. Inspired by the 1964-65 New York World's Fair, Shortt created the sculpture piece, Pavilion Landing, with the aid of park goers and community members during several collaborative sculpting sessions at the park. The piece, which features stranded intergalactic children, is on display at the David Dinkins Circle in Flushing Meadows–Corona Park.

==== Rigged? ====
In 2018, Friends of MacDonald Park in Forest Hills commissioned Shortt to create an outdoor piece that addressed the political, social, and economic systems in the United States, which resulted in the creation of the piece Rigged?. The maze structure, with its accompanying cement rabbits and carrots, is continuously updated depending on the general public's feedback about the piece.

=== Women Who Build - Artists Who Own ===
In 2016, Shortt led an investigative project that analyzed the role of women, or the lack thereof, in the construction industry. With funding provided by the Awesome Foundation, the Queens Council on the Arts, and Culture Push, with additional support from the Eileen Fisher Activating Leadership Grant, Shortt separated the project in two phases. The first phase involved a construction workshop series, where over 100 women were taught basic construction skills and equipment handling. The first phase concluded with the creation of a tiny house on wheels, which is now used as a tea and zen garden.

In the second phase, Shortt commissioned 13 artists so that they can create various interactive installations that prompted community engagement and conversation over the housing crisis in New York City. Among the installations include performing art pieces, participatory embroidery, photography, and more. All installations were then photographed and documented in the exhibition Dwelling at the Queens Museum.

=== RPGA Studio, Inc. ===
In 2009, Shortt established Rego Park Green Alliance, an art organization that addressed community awareness of several important issues affecting the communities of Forest Hills, Kew Gardens, Rego Park, and other surrounding neighborhoods in Queens. RPGA Studio, Inc. gained a nonprofit status in 2015, and has been a recipient of various grants, awards, and partnerships, including the Citizens Committee for New York City Grants, Burning Man Global Arts Grant, National Endowment for the Arts Grant, and others.
