= Q88 (New York City bus) =

Bus route in Queens, New York

q88
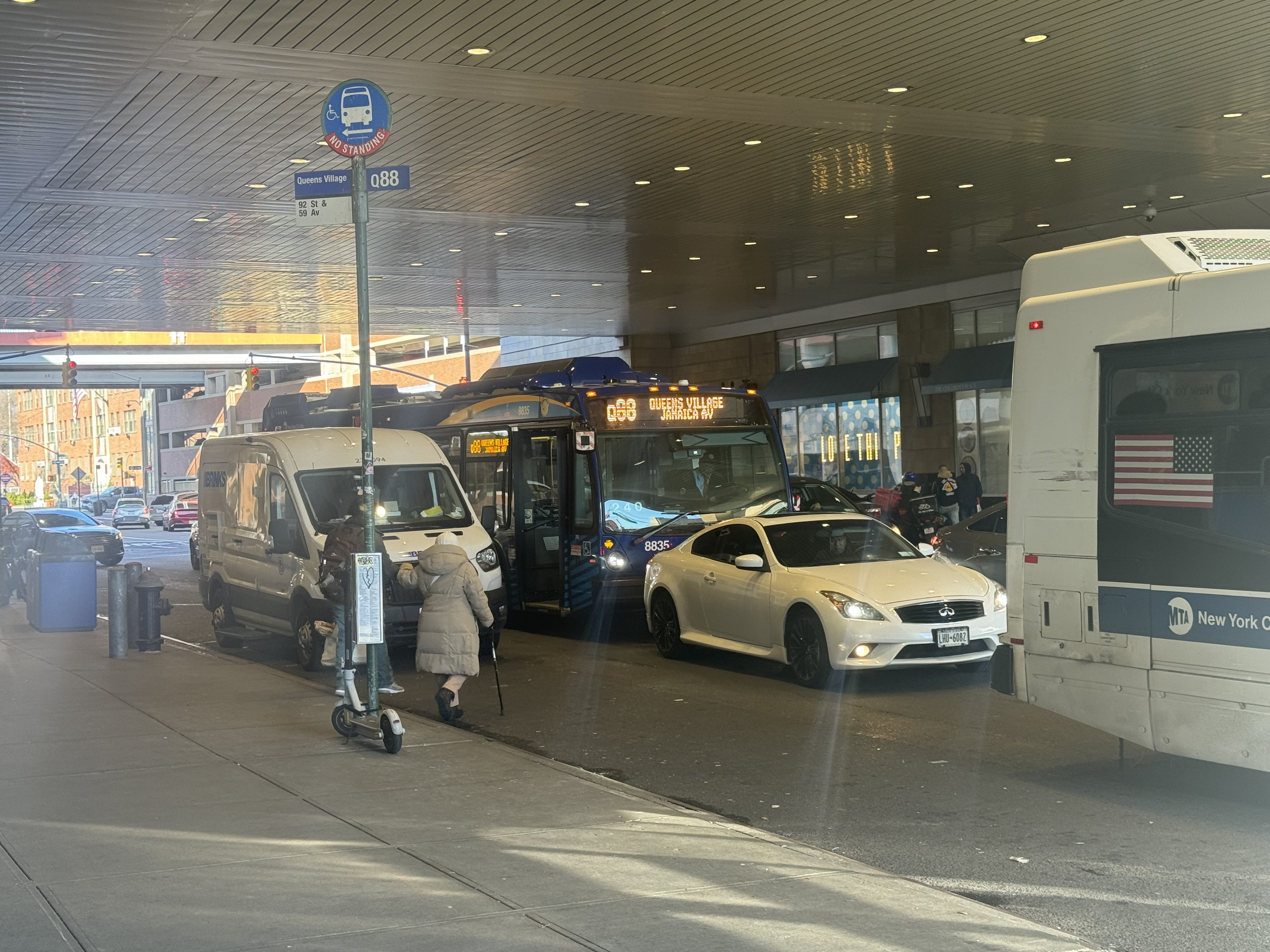
- A 2021 Nova Bus LFS (8835) on the Q88 at Queens Center Mall

Overview
- System: MTA Regional Bus Operations
- Operator: New York City Transit Authority
- Garage: Queens Village Depot
- Vehicle: Nova Bus LFS

Route
- Locale: Queens, New York, U.S.
- Communities served: Elmhurst, Corona, LeFrak City, Rego Park, Forest Hills, Flushing, Queensboro Hill, Kew Gardens Hills, Pomonok, Utopia, Fresh Meadows, Oakland Gardens, Hollis Hills, Queens Village
- Landmarks served: Queens Center Mall, Flushing Meadows–Corona Park, Queens College, Cunningham Park, Alley Pond Park
- Start: Elmhurst- 92nd Street & 59th Avenue / Queens Center Mall & Woodhaven Boulevard Station
- Via: Horace Harding Expressway, 73rd Avenue, Springfield Boulevard
- End: Queens Village - Amboy Lane & Springfield Boulevard / Queens Village LIRR Station
- Length: 9.1 miles (14.6 km)
- Other routes: Q17 Kissena Boulevard/188th Street Q30 Utopia Parkway

Service
- Operates: All times except late nights.
- Annual patronage: 2,513,919 (2025)
- Transfers: Yes

The Q88 bus constitutes a public transit line in Queens, New York City, running primarily along the Long Island Expressway's service road (Horace Harding Expressway), 73rd Avenue and Springfield Boulevard between a major transportation hub and commercial center in Elmhurst and Queens Village. The route is operated by MTA Regional Bus Operations under the New York City Transit brand.

== Route description and service ==
The Q88 begins at the New York City Subway's Woodhaven Boulevard station in Elmhurst at 92nd Street & 59th Avenue, just outside the Queens Center Mall. The route heads east along 59th Avenue and later turns south onto Junction Boulevard. From there, buses head east along Horace Harding Expressway through the neighborhoods of Flushing and Utopia, until 188th Street in Fresh Meadows, where it turns south. Buses will continue south along 188th Street until turning eastbound onto 73rd Avenue, continuing along 73rd Avenue until turning onto Springfield Boulevard (shared with the Q27). The route continues south along Springfield Boulevard until terminating at Jamaica Avenue by the Queens Village LIRR Station.

Buses heading to Elmhurst will follow a largely similar routing, heading north on Springfield Boulevard turning west onto 73rd Avenue, later turning north onto 188th Street and then west onto Horace Harding Expressway. After stopping at Lawrence street, the route will briefly merge onto the Long Island Expressway in order to access the next set of stops, before turning north on Junction Boulevard, west on 57th Avenue to the terminal at 92nd Street, buses layover on 92nd Street before to start eastbound service.

=== School trippers ===
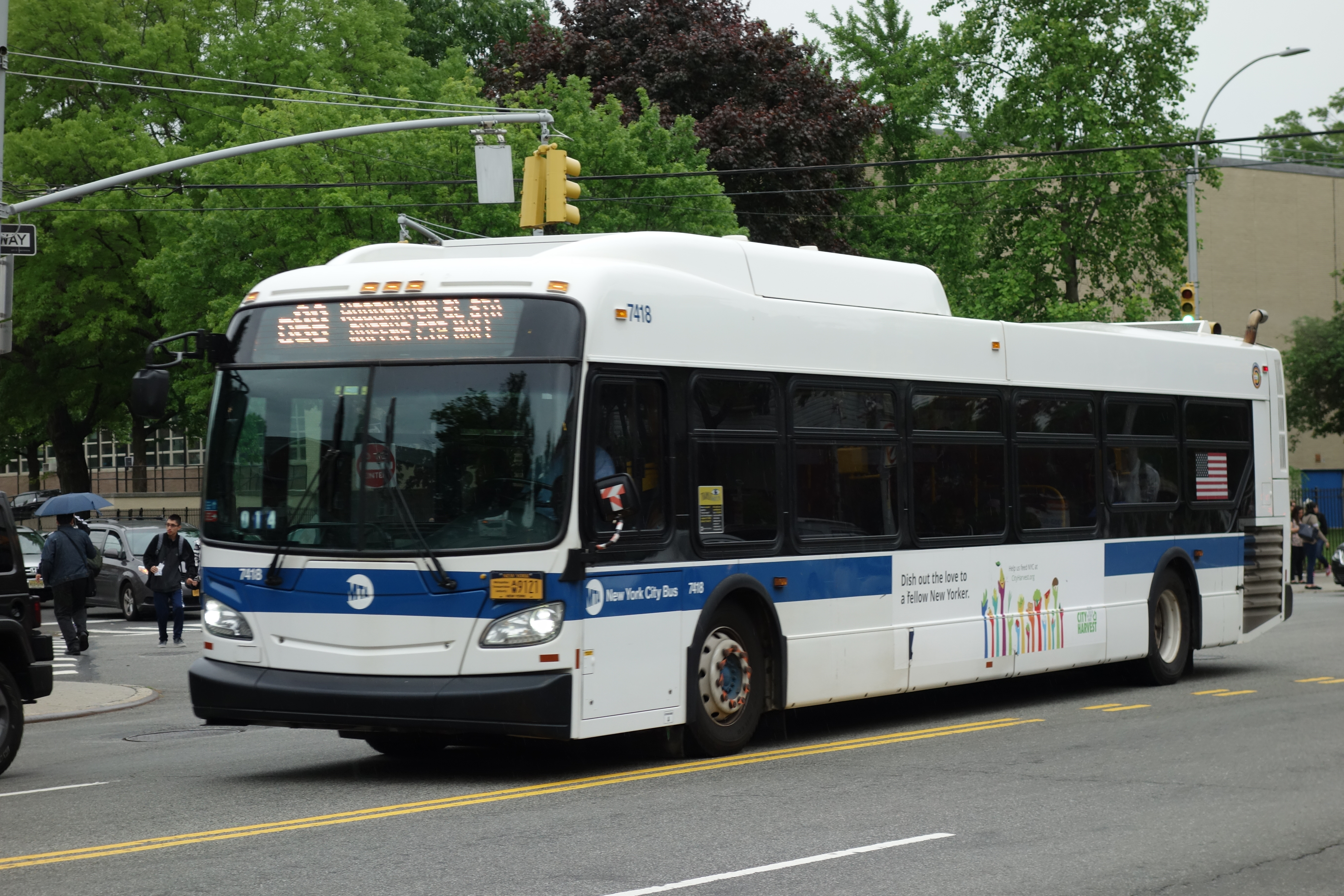
A 2015 XD40 (7418) on the Q88 school tripper to Elmhurst at Main Street/Reeves Avenue. These trippers were split between Queens Village and Casey Stengel until at least 2018.

When school is in session, extra service operates in the eastbound direction during the A.M. rush, with one P.M. tripper departing J.H.S. 216 George J. Ryan via 64th Avenue at 2:40pm. Other A.M. trips either terminate near Francis Lewis High School at Utopia Parkway or continue past 188th Street to serve St. Francis Preparatory School at Francis Lewis Boulevard.

During the P.M. rush, several buses originate at Francis Lewis High School and return to Elmhurst from either the closest stop on its regular route or a special stop just outside the school at Utopia Parkway/59th Avenue. Between 2:56 and 3pm, four more trips head to Elmhurst; two from St. Francis Preparatory School and two from John Bowne High School at Queens College, heading straight to Horace Harding Expressway via Main Street. An extra trip leaves John Bowne at 2:10pm.

== History ==
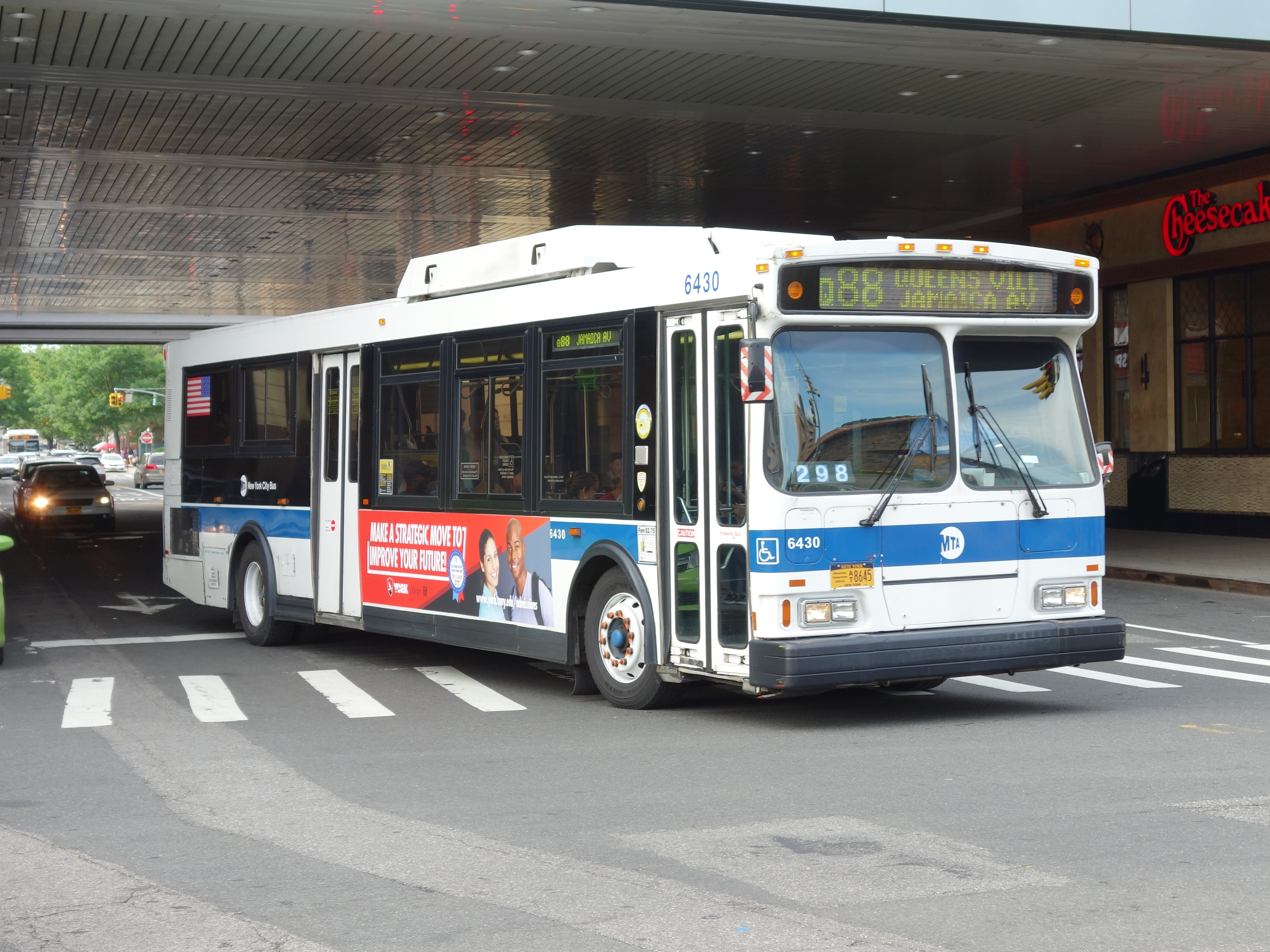
A 2004 Orion VII OG HEV (6430) departing Queens Center Mall on the Q88

=== 1970s ===
On January 25, 1974, the New York City Board of Estimate approved the route, given that the NYCTA provide annual ridership, loss, and profit data to the city's Franchise Bureau. At the time, it was expected that free transfers would be provided to the Q17, Q17A, Q31, and Q44 bus routes. While Queens Borough President Donald Manes had been assured that bus service would begin in two to three months, the NYCTA's general manager refused to begin service as the city demanded some financial records it did not want to release.

The NYCTA had held that its bus operations were only subject to review by the city controller's office, and had fought against efforts by the Franchise Bureau to provide oversight. While the Franchise Bureau previously had no clear authority to mandate that the NYCTA provide financial data, the resolution approving the Q88 route required the NYCTA to provide relevant data after one year of operation. A NYCTA spokesperson, in June 1974, said that it was up to the Franchise Bureau to get an opinion from the corporation counsel to resolve the issue. In August 1974, the city was about to take away NYCTA's authorization for the route and instead award it to Triboro Coach on an experimental basis until August 31, 1975. New York City Board of Estimate approved the route after the NYCTA agreed to informally provide the data for the new route without having to allow the city to audit its records.

Service started on September 16, 1974, after the New York City Board of Estimate approved a franchise for the route on September 12. The route's original eastern terminal was Springfield Boulevard and Union Turnpike. Bus service initially ran daily except Sundays between 6:30 a.m. and 11 p.m. It ran every ten minutes during rush hours, and every twenty minutes at other times. In November 1974, the NYCTA studied extending the route to serve Queensborough Community College to address the lack of student parking. In December 1974, a free transfer was instituted between the Q88 and the Q17A. The Board of Estimate had approved the Q88 route in January 1974 on the condition that this free transfer be provided.

In January 1979, it was announced that Q88 service would be extended from Union Turnpike to Hillside Avenue, with those buses heading along Springfield Boulevard to Jamaica Avenue, on the way to Queens Village Bus Depot, running in service, making stops along Springfield Boulevard, instead of deadheading. Free transfers would also be provided to the Q1 and Q27 for riders continuing south along Springfield Boulevard.

The NYCTA did not extend all Q88 trips to Jamaica Avenue due to a lack of buses. The changes took effect on March 4, 1979.

=== 1980s-present ===
In September 1983, bus service was increased due to increased ridership and the proliferation of illegal taxi operations along the route. One additional bus was added to the route to make short-run trips between Queens Boulevard and Queens College.

On July 15, 1988, the MTA Board approved the extension of all trips on the route along Springfield Boulevard from Hillside Avenue to Jamaica Avenue to simplify service. At the time, 40 percent of trips operate to and from Jamaica Avenue, on an irregular basis. The change took effect on September 11, 1988.

In April 2001, the MTA announced that the span of Sunday service from 7:10 p.m. to 11:15 p.m. would be extended. The change, which was estimated to cost $30,000 a year, was to be implemented in June 2001.

==== Bus redesign ====
In December 2019, the MTA released a draft redesign of the Queens bus network. As part of the redesign, the Q88's section between Queens Center Mall and 188th Street would have been replaced by an "intra-borough" route called the QT12 which would have run from Queens Center Mall to Queensborough Community College, while its section between 73rd Avenue and Springfield Boulevard would have been replaced by a "subway connector" route called the QT33, running from Jamaica's Long Island Rail Road station to Queensborough Community College. The redesign was delayed due to the COVID-19 Pandemic in New York City in 2020 and later dropped due to negative feedback.

In March 2022, a revised plan was released. Under the new plan, the Q88 would have become a "limited-stop" route and would have been extended to Little Neck, replacing the Q30 bus. Its 73rd Avenue section would have been replaced by the proposed route, Q73.

A final bus redesign plan was released in December 2023. The Q88 would retain its original routing, but would be converted to a limited-stop route, eliminating many closely spaced stops in order to speed up service on the route.

On December 17, 2024, addendums to the final plan were released. Among these, stop changes were made on the Q88 and the deadhead in Elmhurst was moved from 94th Street to Junction Boulevard. In addition, the Q88 remained a local route. On January 29, 2025, the current plan was approved by the MTA Board, and the Queens Bus Redesign went into effect in two different phases during Summer 2025. The Q88 is part of Phase I, which began on June 29, 2025.

== Connecting bus routes ==
- Q29 (at 57th Avenue)
- Q14 (at 57th/59th Avenues)
- Q11, Q52 SBS, Q53 SBS, Q59, Q60 (at Queens/Woodhaven Boulevards)
- Q98 (west of College Point Boulevard)
- Q23, Q58 (at 108th Street)
- Q20, Q44 SBS (at Main Street)
- Q17, Q25 (at Kissena Boulevard)
- Q65, Q74 (at 164th Street)
- Q30, Q31, Q75 (at Utopia Parkway)
- Q45 (at 64th Avenue)
- Q76 (at Francis Lewis Boulevard)
- Q27 (on Springfield Boulevard)
- Q46, Q48 (at Union Turnpike)
- Q1, Q36, Q43 (at Hillside Avenue)
- Q36, Q110 (at Jamaica Avenue)
