= 63rd Drive–Rego Park station =

New York City Subway station in Queens

63 Drive–Rego Park
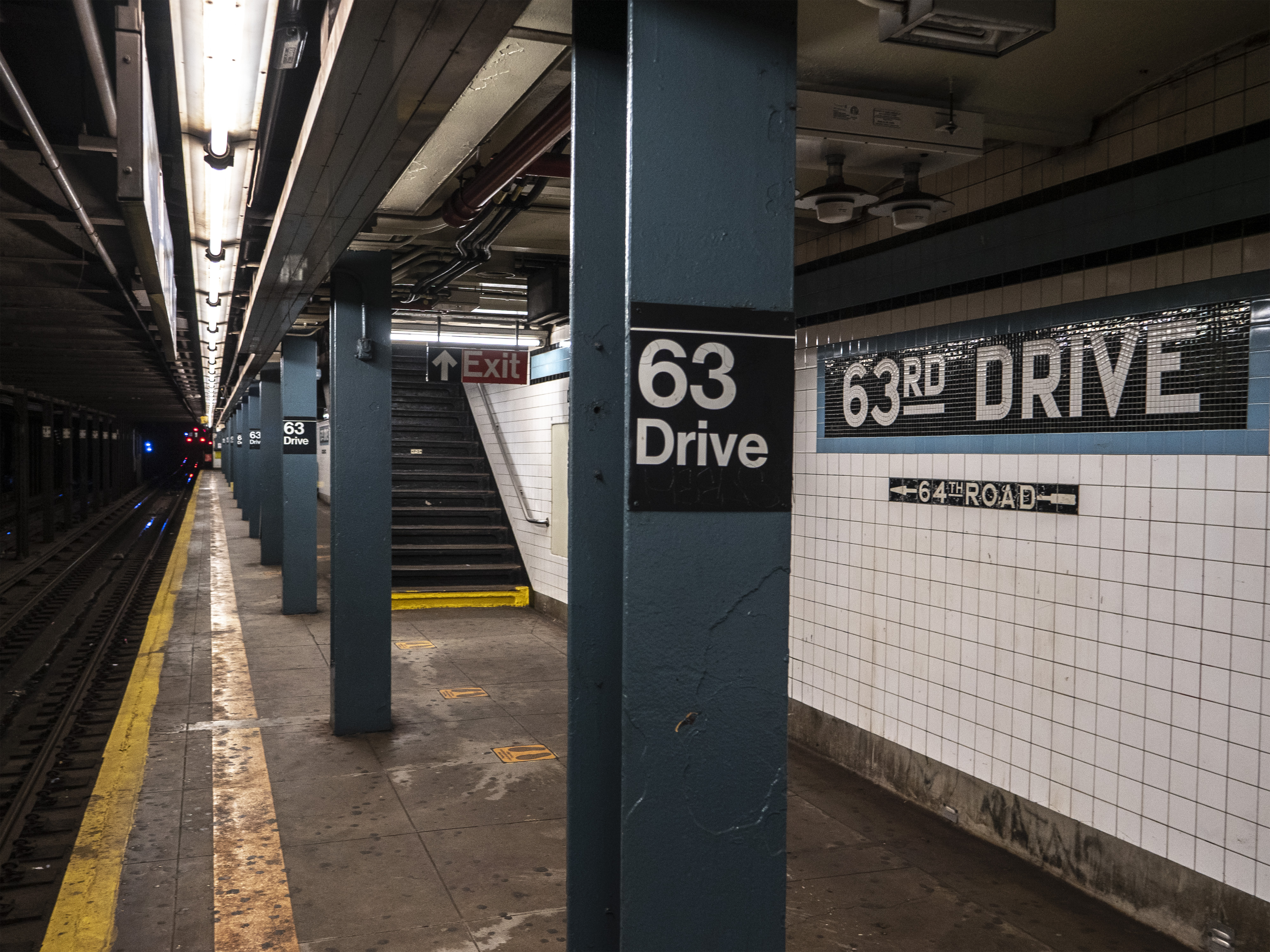
- View of northbound platform

Station statistics
- Address: 63rd Drive & Queens Boulevard; Rego Park, New York
- Borough: Queens
- Locale: Rego Park
- Coordinates: 40.73°N 73.862°W
- Division: B (IND)
- Line: IND Queens Boulevard Line
- Services: E (late nights); F (late nights); M (weekdays during the day); R (all times except late nights)
- Transit: NYCT Bus: Q38, Q59; MTA Bus: Q60, Q72, QM10, QM11, QM18, QM40
- Structure: Underground
- Platforms: 2 side platforms
- Tracks: 4

Other information
- Opened: December 31, 1936; 89 years ago
- Accessible: No; planned
- Former/other names: 63rd Drive

Traffic
- 2025: 3,216,674 ▲6.4%
- Rank: 119 out of 423
Services
Preceding station	New York City Subway	Following station
Woodhaven Boulevard E F M R via 36th Street	Local	67th Avenue E F M R toward Forest Hills–71st Avenue
does not stop here
Location
Location within New York City Subway
Location within New York City
Location within New York
Track layout
Street map
Station service legend
Symbol	Description
Stops all times except late nights	Stops all times except late nights
Stops late nights only	Stops late nights only
Stops weekdays during the day	Stops weekdays during the day

The 63rd Drive–Rego Park station is a local station on the IND Queens Boulevard Line of the New York City Subway, consisting of four tracks. Located at 63rd Drive and Queens Boulevard in the Rego Park neighborhood of Queens, it is served by the M train on weekdays, and by the R train at all times except late nights, when the E and F trains take over service.

== History ==
The Queens Boulevard Line was one of the first lines built by the city-owned Independent Subway System (IND), and stretches between the IND Eighth Avenue Line in Manhattan and 179th Street and Hillside Avenue in Jamaica, Queens. The Queens Boulevard Line was in part financed by a Public Works Administration (PWA) loan and grant of $25 million. In 1934 and 1935, construction of the extension to Jamaica was suspended for 15 months and was halted by strikes. Construction was further delayed due to a strike in 1935, instigated by electricians opposing wages paid by the General Railway Signal Company. By August 1935, work had resumed on the 67th Avenue station and three other stations on the Queens Boulevard Line.

On December 31, 1936, the IND Queens Boulevard Line was extended by eight stops, and 3.5 miles (5.6 km), from its previous terminus at Roosevelt Avenue to Union Turnpike, and the 63rd Drive station opened as part of this extension. The E train, which initially served all stops on the new extension, began making express stops in April 1937, and local GG trains began serving the extension at the time.

In July 2025, the MTA announced that it would install elevators at 12 stations, including the 63rd Drive–Rego Park station, as part of its 2025–2029 capital program. The elevators would make the station fully compliant with the Americans with Disabilities Act of 1990.

== Station layout ==
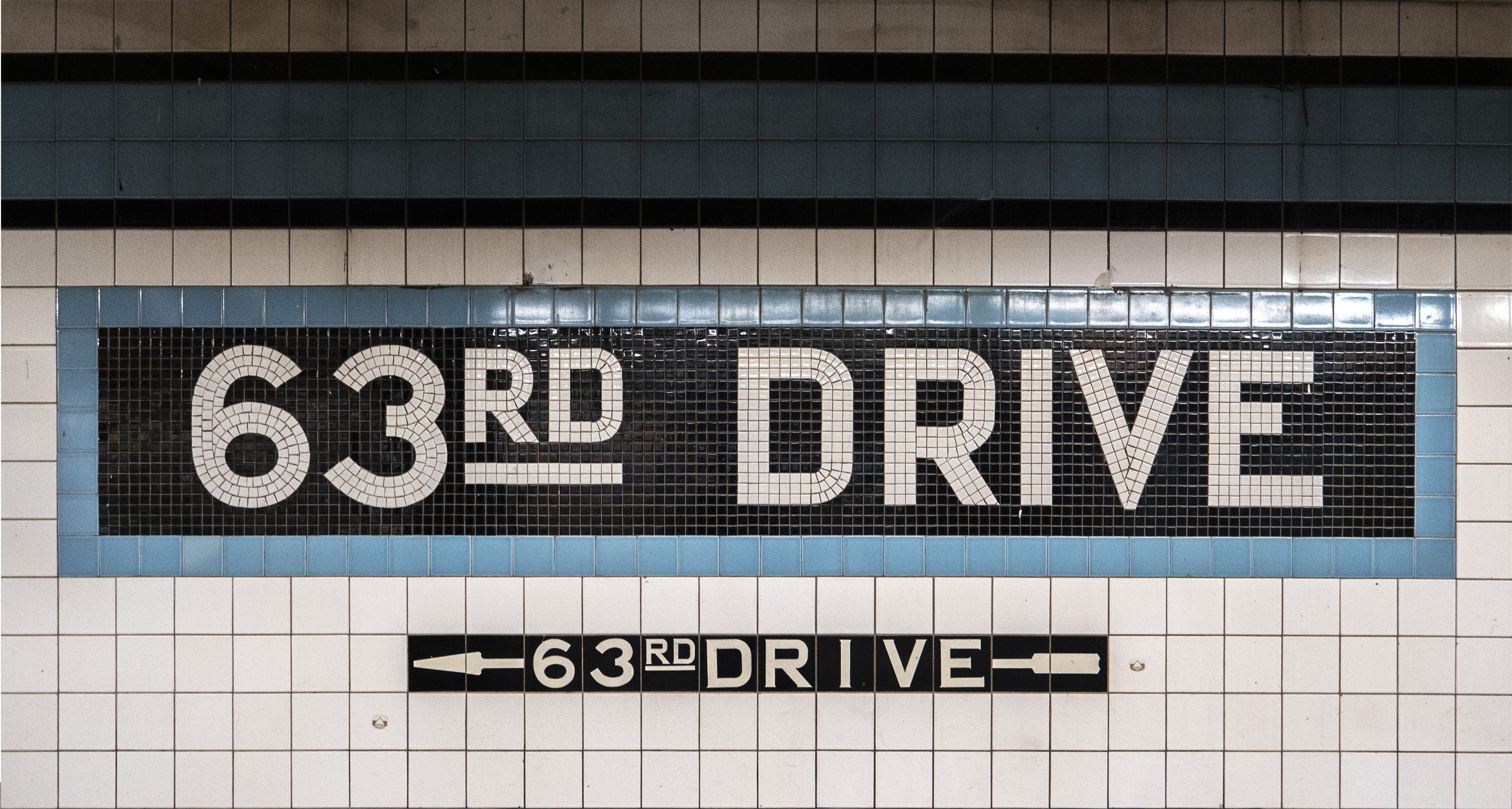
Mosaic name tablet

There are four tracks and two side platforms; the two center express tracks are used by the E and F trains at all times except late nights. The E and F trains serve the station at night, the M train serves the station on weekdays during the day, and the R train serves the station at all times except late nights. The station is between Woodhaven Boulevard to the west and 67th Avenue to the east.

Both platforms have a blue tile band with a black border and mosaic name tablets reading "63RD DRIVE" in white sans-serif lettering on a black background and matching blue border. A few of these tablets have modern metal signs above them reading "Rego Park". Small tile captions reading "63RD DRIVE" in white lettering on black run below the tile band, and directional signs in the same style are present below some of the name tablets. The tile band was part of a color-coded tile system used throughout the IND. The tile colors were designed to facilitate navigation for travelers going away from Lower Manhattan. As such, the blue tiles used at the 63rd Drive station are also used at Jackson Heights–Roosevelt Avenue, the next express station to the west, while a different tile color is used at Forest Hills–71st Avenue, the next express station to the east. Blue tiles are similarly used at the other local stations between Roosevelt Avenue and 71st Avenue.

Dark slate blue I-beam columns run along both platforms at regular intervals, alternating ones having the standard black station name plate with white lettering. The I-beam piers are located every 15 feet (4.6 m) and support girders above the platforms. The roof girders are also connected to columns in the walls adjoining each platform. This station has an upper level mezzanine that is about one-third the length of the platforms. The mezzanine is split into three sections by a wall on the southbound side and a chain link fence on the northbound side. Numerous staircases from each platform go up to their respective outer section of the mezzanine. A small turnstile bank on the southbound side and exit-only turnstiles on the northbound side lead to the main fare control area.

The tunnel is covered by a U-shaped trough that contains utility pipes and wires. The outer walls of this trough are composed of columns, spaced approximately every 5 feet (1.5 m) with concrete infill between them. There is a 1-inch (25 mm) gap between the tunnel wall and the platform wall, which is made of 4-inch (100 mm)-thick brick covered over by a tiled finish. The columns between the tracks are also spaced every 5 feet (1.5 m), with no infill.

=== Exits ===
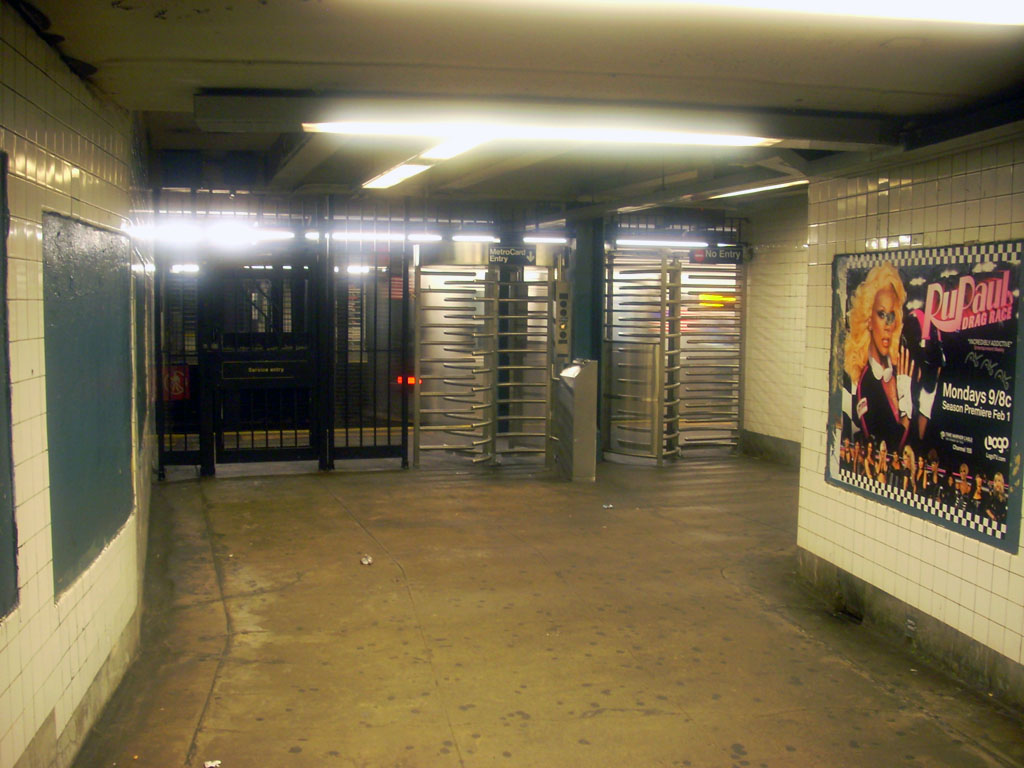
High Entry/Exit Turnstile

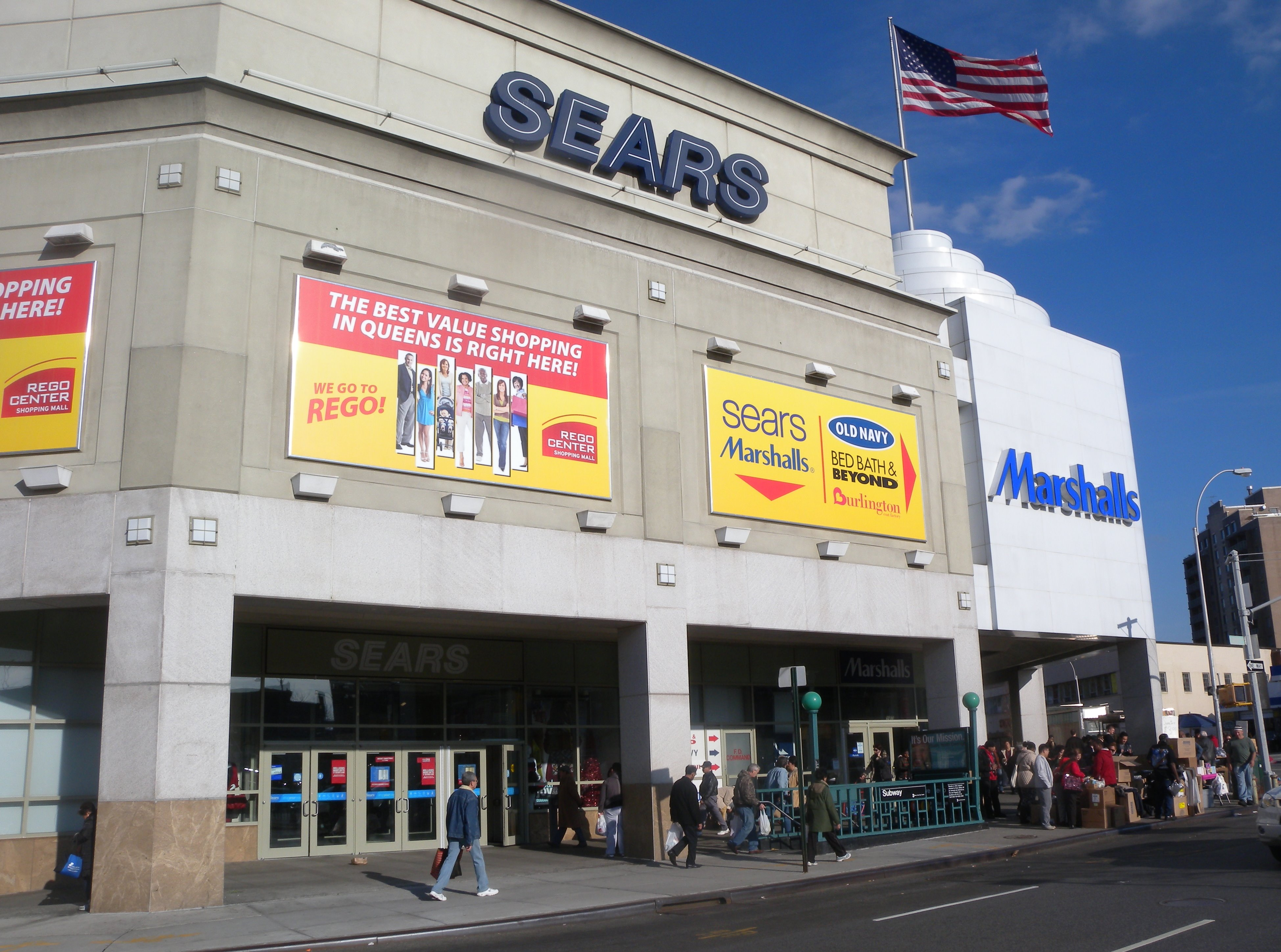
Rego Center above station stair

Towards the northwest end of the mezzanine, a single extra-wide staircase from each platform goes up to a crossover, where a turnstile bank leads to the main fare control area. There is a token booth and two street stairs, one to the northwest corner of 63rd Drive and Queens Boulevard and the other to the south side of Queens Boulevard near this intersection.

On the southeast side of the mezzanine, high entry-exit turnstiles from either outer section lead to an un-staffed fare control area, where one street stair goes up to the northwest corner of 64th Avenue and Queens Boulevard while the other goes up to the south side of Queens Boulevard near the intersection with 64th Road. The mezzanine has mosaic directional signs in white lettering on a teal border. The center section connects the two fare control areas, but provides no crossover.

On the extreme northwest (railroad south) end of the platforms, high turnstiles lead to a single staircase that goes up to either western corners of 63rd Road and Queens Boulevard, the northwest one for the Manhattan-bound platform and the southwest one for the Forest Hills-bound platform. Prior to 2010, these entry points were exit-only. They were made entrances to accommodate traffic from the expansion of Rego Center.

== Unfinished Rockaway spur ==
East of this station, there is an unfinished signal tower on the Jamaica-bound (railroad north) platform and a bellmouth that diverges to the south from the local track. Another tunnel from the Manhattan-bound local track diverges north, then curves south under the Queens Boulevard Line to join the other bellmouth. These were provisions for a planned expansion in the 1930s that would have connected with the IND Rockaway Line (formerly a Long Island Rail Road branch) towards Howard Beach, JFK Airport, and the Rockaways. This spur would have run down 66th Avenue before joining the Rockaway Line at its former junction with the LIRR Main Line. In January 2013, a petition was started on change.org to make use of the bellmouths to connect the station to the currently unused portion of the Rockaway Line.
