= Queens Center Mall =

Shopping mall in New York City

Queens Center
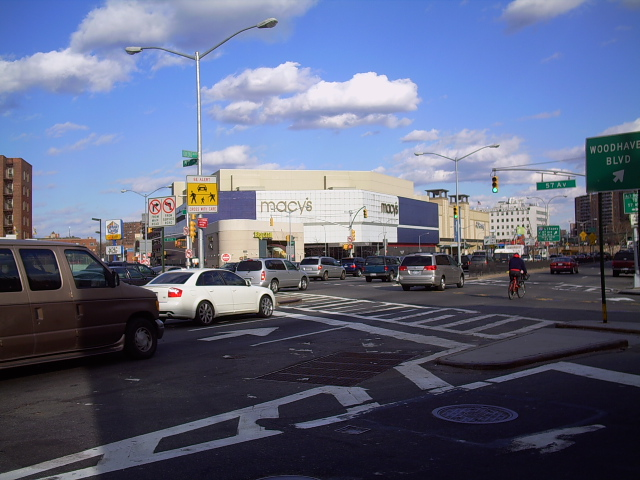
- Queens Center in 2007
- Location: Elmhurst, New York
- Coordinates: 40.734722°N 73.86944°W
- Address: 90-15 Queens Boulevard; Elmhurst, NY 11373
- Opened: September 12, 1973; 53 years ago
- Developer: Taubman Centers
- Manager: Macerich
- Owner: Macerich
- Num. of stores: over 150
- Num. of anchor tenants: 3
- Floor area: 967,000 square feet (89,800 m^{2})
- Floors: 4 central floors (5 in Macy’s, 3 in JCPenney and Burlington building)
- Public transit: New York City Subway: Woodhaven Boulevard; New York City Bus: Q14, Q29, Q59, Q88, Q98; MTA Bus: Q11, Q52 SBS, Q53 SBS, Q60
- Website: shopqueenscenter.com

Queens Center is an urban shopping mall in Elmhurst, Queens, New York City, on Queens Boulevard between 57th Avenue and Woodhaven Boulevard, one block away from Queens Place Mall. Queens Center is the largest mall in Queens. It is currently owned and managed by The Macerich Company, who purchased the mall in the 1990s. The building where JCPenney and Burlington are located is separately owned by Ashkenazy Acquisition Corp, yet it is interconnected with the Macerich-owned main portion of the mall.

There are over 150 stores located at the center. The mall's current anchor tenants are Macy's, Primark, and JCPenney. A large food court is located in the lower level where Fast food restaurants such as Charleys Philly Steaks, Chick-fil-A, Chipotle Mexican Grill, KFC, Kido Sushi, Noodle House, Panda Express, Sarku Japan, and Shake Shack operate.

The mall has a gross leasable area of 967,000 square feet (89,800 m^{2}).

The mall is adjacent to the Woodhaven Boulevard station (M and R trains) on the IND Queens Boulevard Line of the New York City Subway. It is across the street from the former St. John's Queens Hospital and the Rock Church. It is also adjacent to Exit 19 of the Long Island Expressway.

== History ==
Queens Center opened on September 12, 1973, on land previously occupied by a children's amusement park named Fairyland, a supermarket, and automobile parking. The original anchor tenants were Abraham & Straus and Ohrbach's. The mall underwent a major expansion from 2002 to 2004, nearly doubling in size as the original mall was renovated and another wing was added to the east of 92nd Street.

For a limited time during the 2006 Christmas shopping season, the Macy's location in Queens Center was open 24 hours a day, becoming the first to do so. Since then, it has had all-day operating hours during every Christmas shopping season.

On March 8, 2019, the mall was evacuated when a supposed appearance by The Bronx rapper, A Boogie wit da Hoodie was canceled after fans, most of whom were high school teens that had a half day of school rioted and looted stores, including the sneaker store, Foot Locker. The mall reopened the next day.

The mall underwent renovations during the mid-2020s. This included upgrades to furnishings, lighting, and the parking lots.

== Anchor tenants ==
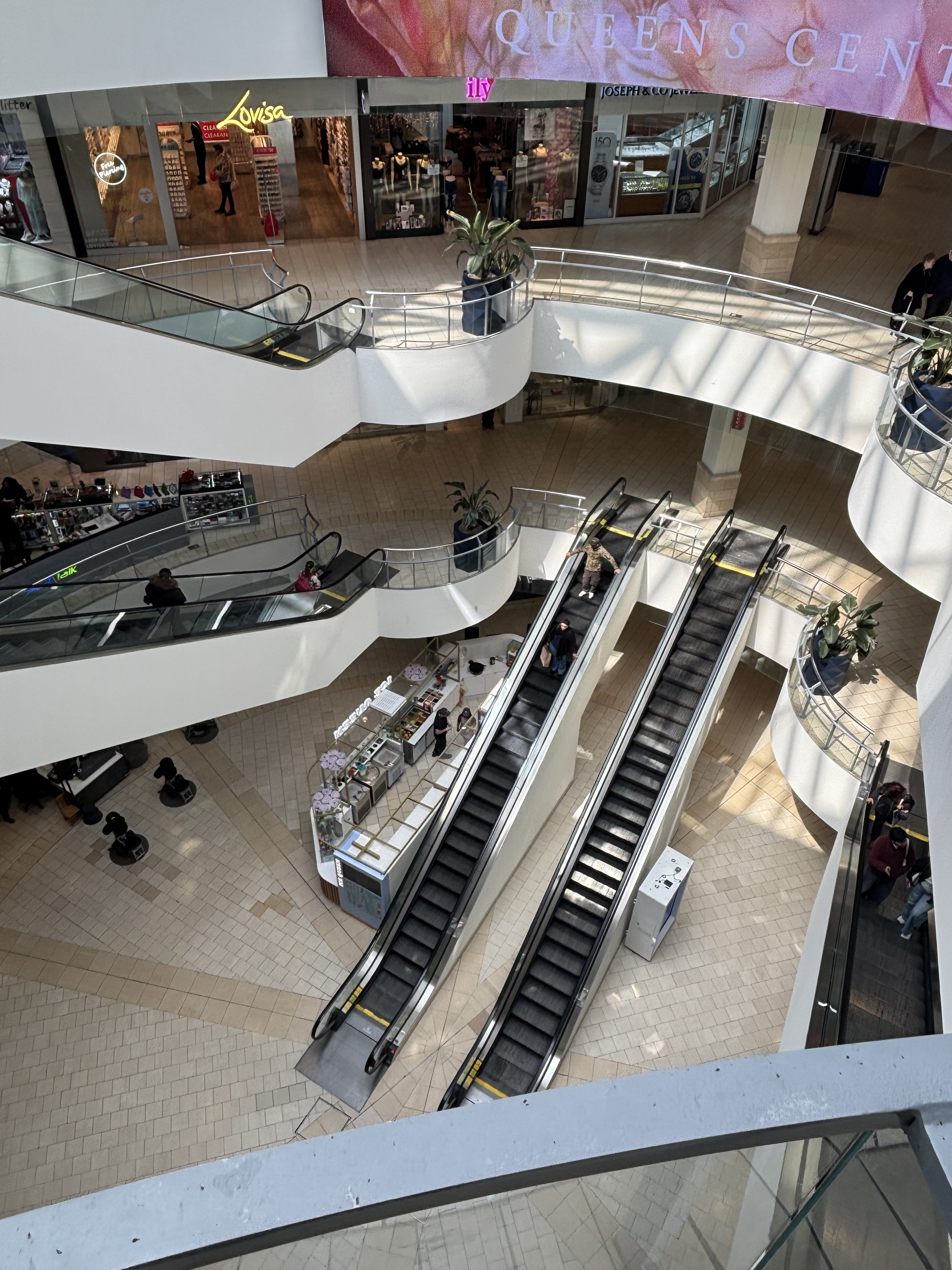
Interior view of Queens Center Mall from the top floor, April 2026

=== Current ===
- JCPenney (Opened in 1989)
- Macy's (Opened in 1995)
- Primark (Opened in 2024)

=== Former ===
- Ohrbach's (Opened in 1973. Closed in 1987. Replaced by Steinbach)
- Steinbach (Opened in 1987. Closed in 1990. Replaced by JCPenney)
- Abraham & Straus (Opened in 1973. Closed in 1995. Replaced by Macy's)
