= Q59 (New York City bus) =

Bus route in Queens and Brooklyn, New York

q59
- Grand Street Line
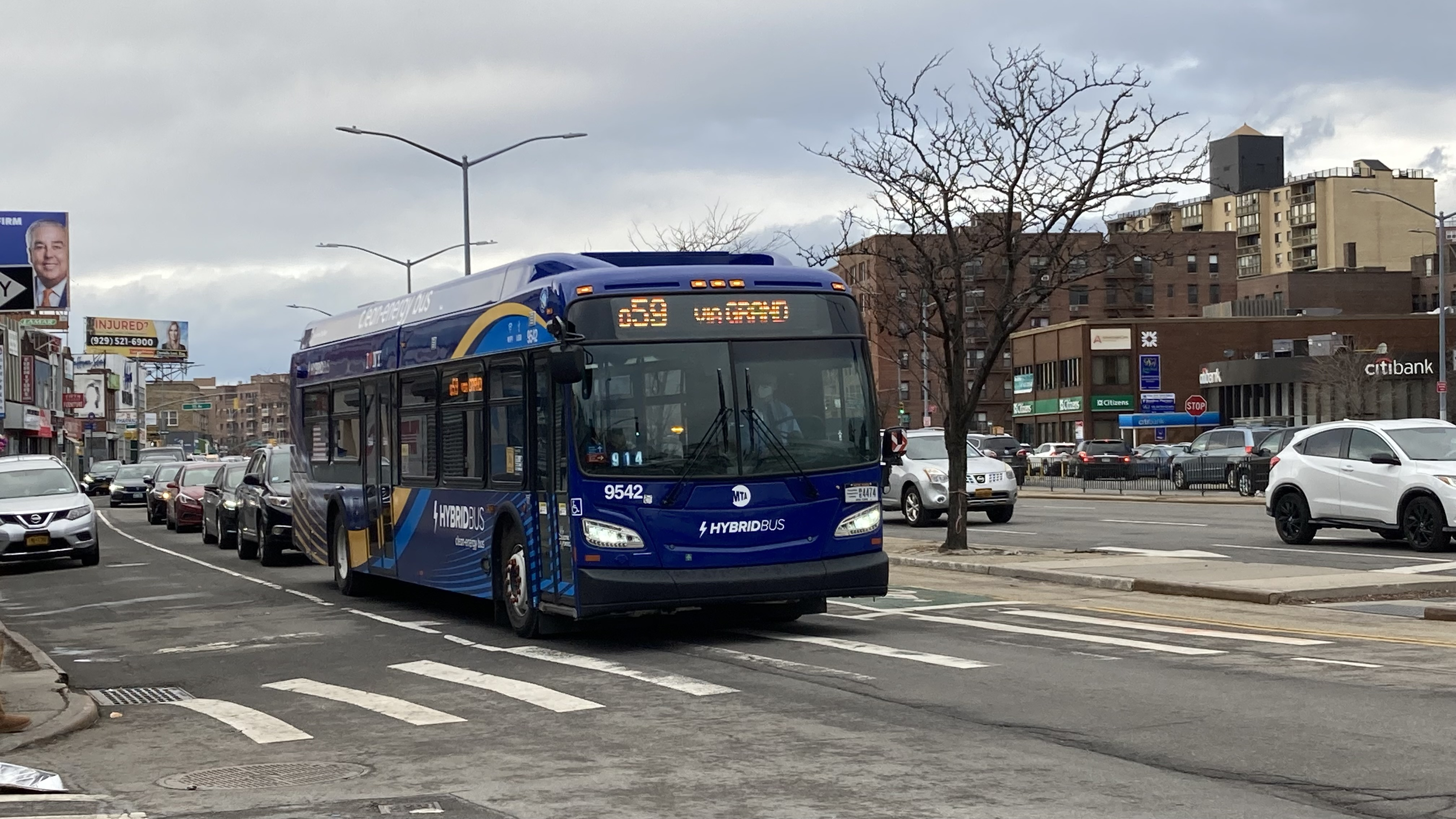
- A 2021 XDE40 (9542) on the Q59 on Queens Blvd

Overview
- System: MTA Regional Bus Operations
- Operator: New York City Transit Authority
- Garage: Grand Avenue Depot
- Vehicles: New Flyer Xcelsior XD40; New Flyer Xcelsior XDE40; New Flyer Xcelsior XE40

Route
- Locale: Brooklyn and Queens, New York, U.S.
- Communities served: Williamsburg, East Williamsburg, Maspeth, Elmhurst, Rego Park
- Landmarks served: Williamsburg Bridge Plaza Bus Terminal, Queens Place Mall, Queens Center Mall, Rego Center
- Start: Williamsburg, Brooklyn – Williamsburg Bridge Plaza Bus Terminal
- Via: Grand Street and Grand Avenue
- End: Rego Park, Queens – Junction Boulevard & Horace Harding Expressway (Rego Center)
- Length: 6.47 miles (10.41 km) (streetcar line); 7.6 miles (12.2 km) (Q59)
- Other routes: Q58 Fresh Pond Road/Grand/Corona Avenues; Q98 Fresh Pond Road/Grand Avenue/Horace Harding Expwy

Service
- Operates: 24 hours
- Annual patronage: 1,823,231 (2025)
- Transfers: Yes
- Timetable: Q59

The Grand Street Line is a public transit line in Brooklyn and Queens, New York City, running mostly along the continuous Grand Street and Grand Avenue between Williamsburg, Brooklyn and Maspeth, Queens. It then continues down Queens Boulevard to the 63rd Drive–Rego Park station. Originally a streetcar line, it is now the Q59 bus route, operated by the New York City Transit Authority between Williamsburg and Rego Park, Queens.

== Route description ==
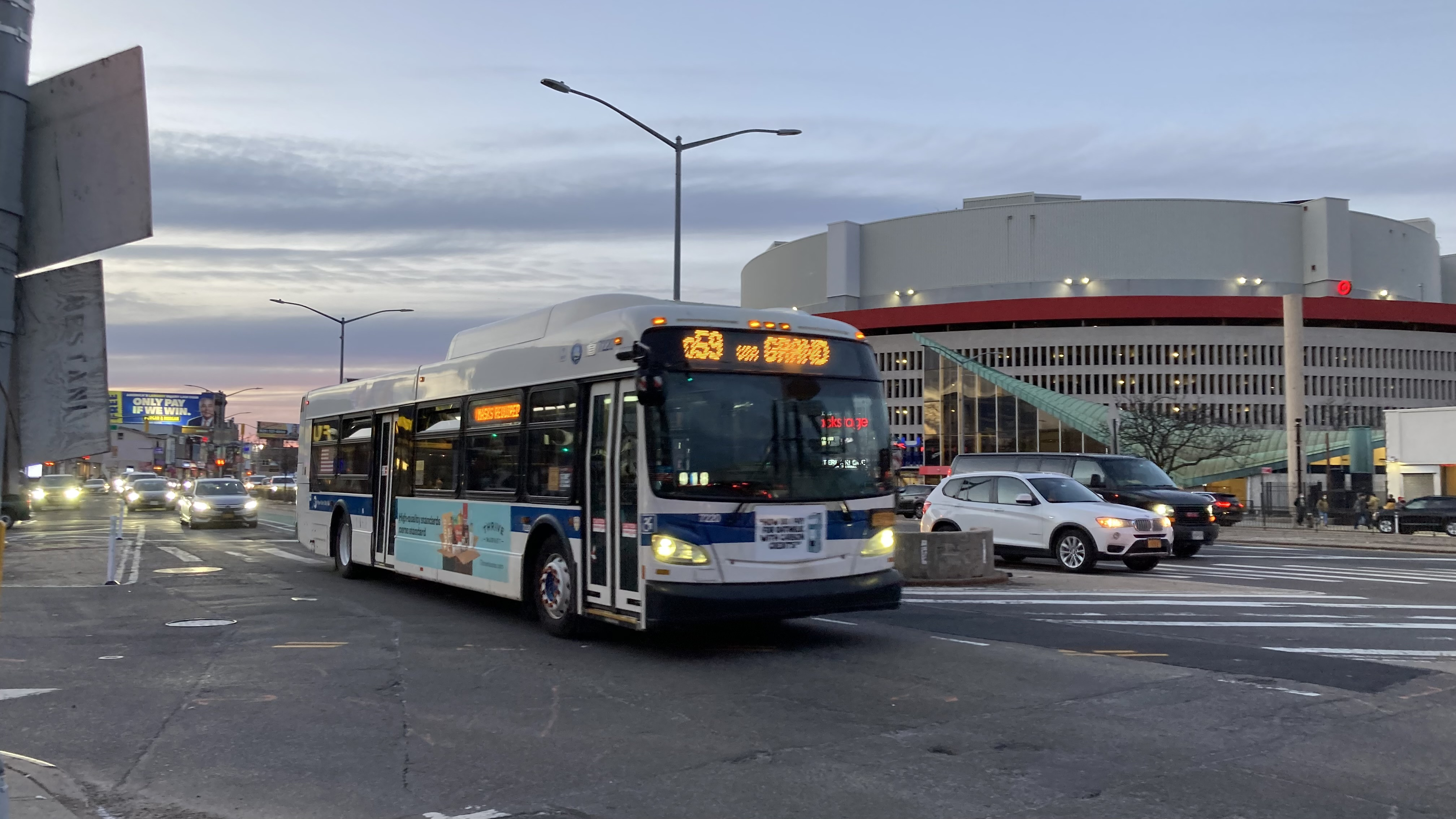
A 2015 XD40 (7220) on the Q59 at Queens Boulevard/Grand Avenue

The Q59's western terminus is at the Williamsburg Bridge Plaza Bus Terminal in Williamsburg, Brooklyn. From there, it goes west on Broadway, turning right on Kent Avenue to travel north to Grand Street. However, since Grand Street is not continuous across the Brooklyn–Queens Expressway (BQE), the eastbound Q59 uses Roebling Street, Metropolitan Avenue, and Union Avenue to travel around the BQE. At Grand Street, the Q59 turns left, continuing until Gardner Avenue and Metropolitan Avenue (eastbound traffic is defaulted onto Metropolitan Avenue due to Grand Street being one lane westbound-only approaching the Metropolitan Avenue bridge over Newtown Creek). The eastbound Q59 then turns right, back onto Grand Street, then continues across the Grand Street Bridge and into Maspeth, until a one-way block of opposing traffic on Grand Avenue coming from its intersection with Flushing Avenue forces the Q59 to turn right and then left to stay on Grand, joining the Q58. It remains on Grand Avenue until Queens Boulevard, when it turns right onto the eastbound service road while the Q58 goes to across Queens Boulevard onto Corona Avenue toward Flushing. The Q59 then continues along Queens Boulevard until Eliot Avenue, where it turns left along the Long Island Expressway. The Q59 turns right on Junction Boulevard and terminates at 62nd Road, near Rego Center and the 63rd Drive–Rego Park subway station in Rego Park.

The westbound Q59 turns right off 62nd Road onto Queens Boulevard. At 90th Street, it makes a right to serve Queens Center and Queens Place Mall. This is so the Q59 can make a turn from the service road into the main road that would otherwise be illegal; it must do this in order to access the left-turn lane at Grand Avenue, which can only be served from the main road. The Q59 turns left at 56th Avenue and then right again into the Queens Boulevard main road, using the left-turn lane to turn left onto Grand Avenue. The Q59 continues down Grand Avenue until it turns into Grand Street, and goes straight down Grand Street until it reaches Union Avenue, where it turns right to go around the BQE. The Q59 makes a left at Metropolitan Avenue, a left at Roebling Street, and another right at Grand Street. It goes down Grand Street until Wythe Avenue, turning left there. At Broadway, the Q59 makes another left and continues until it enters the Williamsburg Bridge Plaza Bus Terminal.

== History ==
At various points in its history, the Grand Street Line has been served by horsecar, trolley, and bus, with service modifications implemented by New York City's mass-transit authorities in response to varying ridership levels (and associated revenues).

=== Railroad ===
Initial construction of the line, by the Grand Street and Newtown Rail Road, began in September 1860. Its first section (from Williamsburg's Grand Street Ferry to Bushwick Avenue) was completed on October 15, 1860, with a public opening expected by the end of that month. In addition to the Grand Street Ferry, cars soon also served the Broadway Ferry via the Brooklyn City Rail Road's Greenpoint Line trackage on Kent Avenue. By 1865, the line had been extended from Grand Street north along Bushwick Avenue, Humboldt Street, and Meeker Avenue to Penny Bridge. The tracks in Bushwick Avenue were removed after trains began using Humboldt Street instead of between Grand Street and Maspeth Avenue on July 19, 1870.

The main line was later lengthened eastward from the intersection of Grand and Humboldt Streets, along the Grand Street extension. It opened to the city line (Newtown Creek) on June 9, 1875 and to Newtown on August 1, 1876. The old line to Penny Bridge became the Meeker Avenue Line.

When the Maspeth Depot opened in 1885, the line was truncated to Maspeth. Service between Maspeth and Elmhurst became a shuttle (which later became a part of the Flushing–Ridgewood Line).

The Brooklyn City Rail Road leased the Grand Street and Newtown on May 1, 1890.

=== Bus line ===
In 1949, the New York City Board of Transportation reacted to declining ridership by proposing the conversion of the line to a bus route. The New York City Board of Estimate approved the change on October 13, 1949, and the streetcars were permanently removed on December 11, 1949.

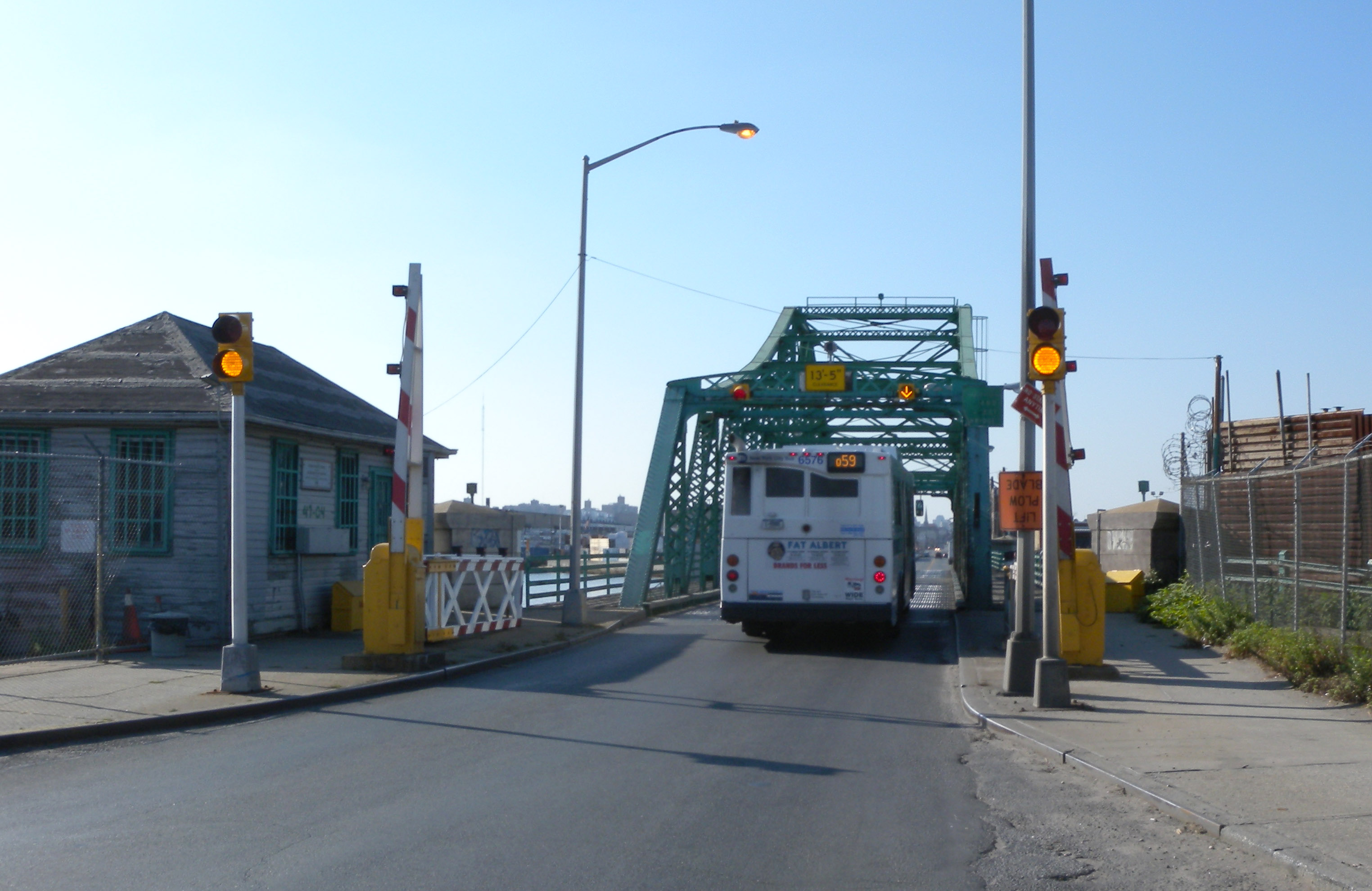
A 2005 Orion VII OG HEV (6576) on the Q59 crossing the Grand Street Bridge.

On November 6, 1954, the NYCTA proposed to eliminate weekday service between 7 p.m. and 5 a.m. and all weekend service to cut costs. Free transfers would have been provided between the B53 and B57. In the fall of 1975, the bus route was extended from 72nd Street in Maspeth east to Elmhurst and southeast on Queens Boulevard to Junction Boulevard in Rego Park. On June 25, 1979, seven westbound trips from Rego Park were added between 10:30 p.m. and 1:36 a.m. On December 11, 1988, the line was relabeled to its current identifier, the Q59.

In January 2008, 24/7 service was added to the Q59 route. In August 2009, southbound service was rerouted from Kent Avenue to Wythe Avenue due to the conversion of Kent Avenue to a one-way northbound street to restructure the bike lanes on that street. Service was eventually extended to the Williamsburg Bridge Plaza Bus Terminal in 2010, and in September 2016, the eastern terminus of the route was relocated to 62nd Drive to avoid a hazardous U-turn at 63rd Road/63rd Drive, as well as provide a closer connection to Rego Center.

=== Bus redesigns ===
In December 2019, the MTA released a draft redesign of the Queens bus network. As part of the redesign, the Q59 bus would have been truncated to the Woodhaven Boulevard station. The redesign was delayed due to the COVID-19 pandemic in New York City in 2020, and the original draft plan was dropped due to negative feedback.

A revised plan was released in March 2022. As part of the new plan, the Q59 would be realigned in Brooklyn to use Borinquen Place instead; the discontinued routing within Williamsburg would be covered by another route in a future Brooklyn bus redesign. At the eastern end, the route would be straightened out, which might include reinstating the U-turn at 63rd Road/63rd Drive.

A final bus-redesign plan was released in December 2023. The Q59 would retain its eastern terminal at Junction Boulevard, but the Q59 would be realigned in Brooklyn to use Borinquen Place instead, and one turn on the eastbound Q59 in East Williamsburg, Brooklyn, would be moved. The B53 and B62 routes would make stops near the Q59's discontinued routing in Williamsburg.

On December 17, 2024, addendums to the final plan were released. Among these, the Brooklyn portion of the Q59 will be carried over to the Brooklyn Bus Redesign for adjustments, while the Queens portion will be retained due to a separate plan for Queens Boulevard by the NYC DOT. On January 29, 2025, the current plan was approved by the MTA Board, and the Queens Bus Redesign went into effect in two different phases during Summer 2025. The Q59 is part of Phase I, which started on June 29, 2025.

== See also ==
=== Connecting bus routes ===
- B24, B32, B39, B44 SBS, B46, B60, B62 (at Williamsburg Bridge Plaza)
- B48 (at Lorimer Street)
- B43 (at Graham Avenue)
- Q54 (at Metropolitan Avenue)
- Q39 (at Rust/61st Streets)
- B57 (at 61st Street)
- Q58 (at Fresh Pond Road/Queens Boulevard)
- Q98 (at Fresh Pond Road/Woodhaven Boulevard)
- Q67 (at Borden Avenue)
- Q18 (at 69th Street)
- Q47 (at 79th Street)
- Q53 SBS, Q60 (at Queens Boulevard)
- Q11, Q14, Q29, Q52 SBS (at Woodhaven Boulevard)
- Q72, Q88 (at Junction Boulevard)
- Q38 (at 62nd/63rd Drives)
