= Q14 and Q38 buses =

Bus routes in Queens, New York

q14, q38
- Q14: Eliot Avenue; East Elmhurst-Corona-Ridgewood; Q38: Penelope Avenue−63rd Drive; Middle Village−Rego Park-Forest Hills
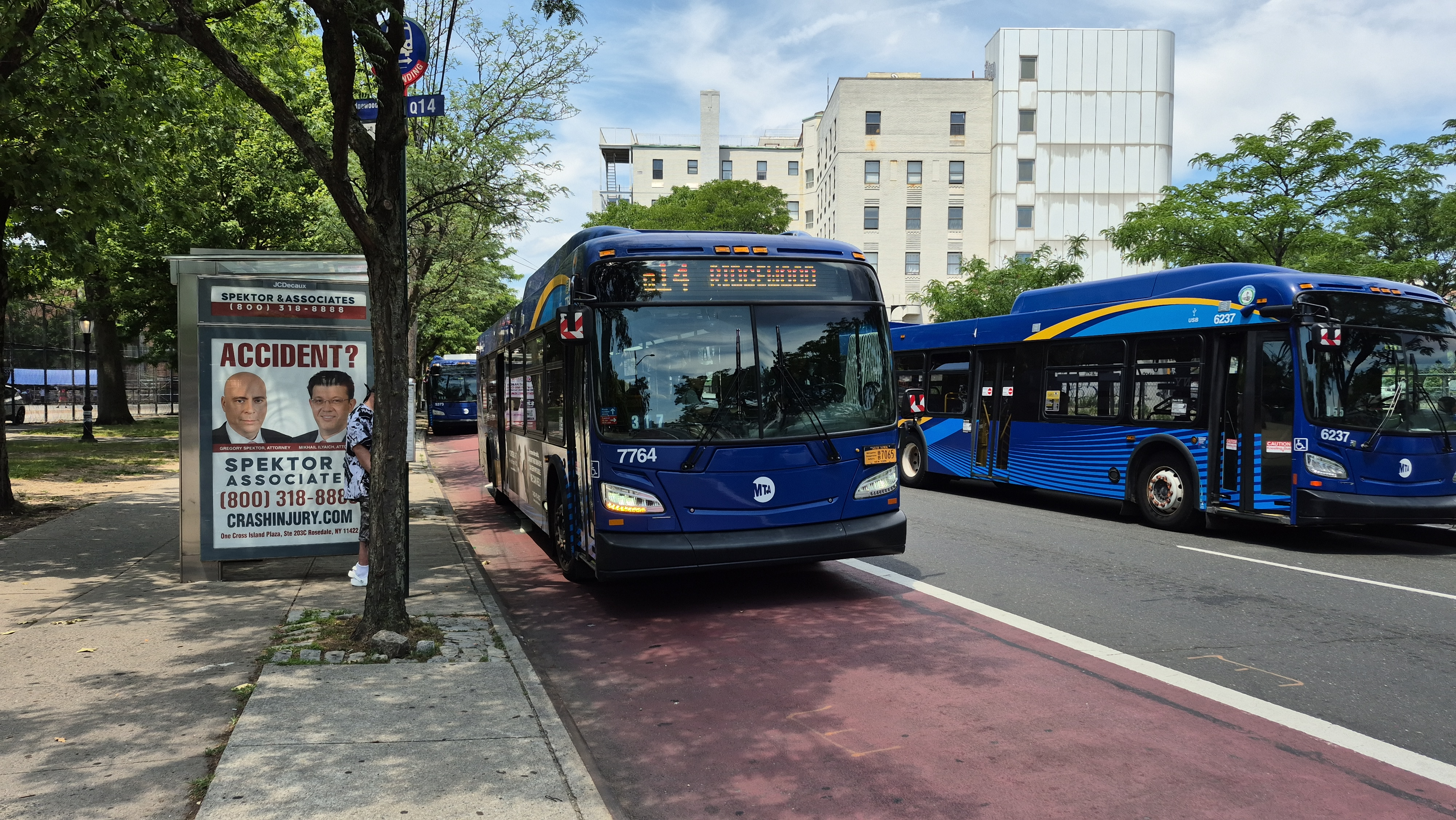
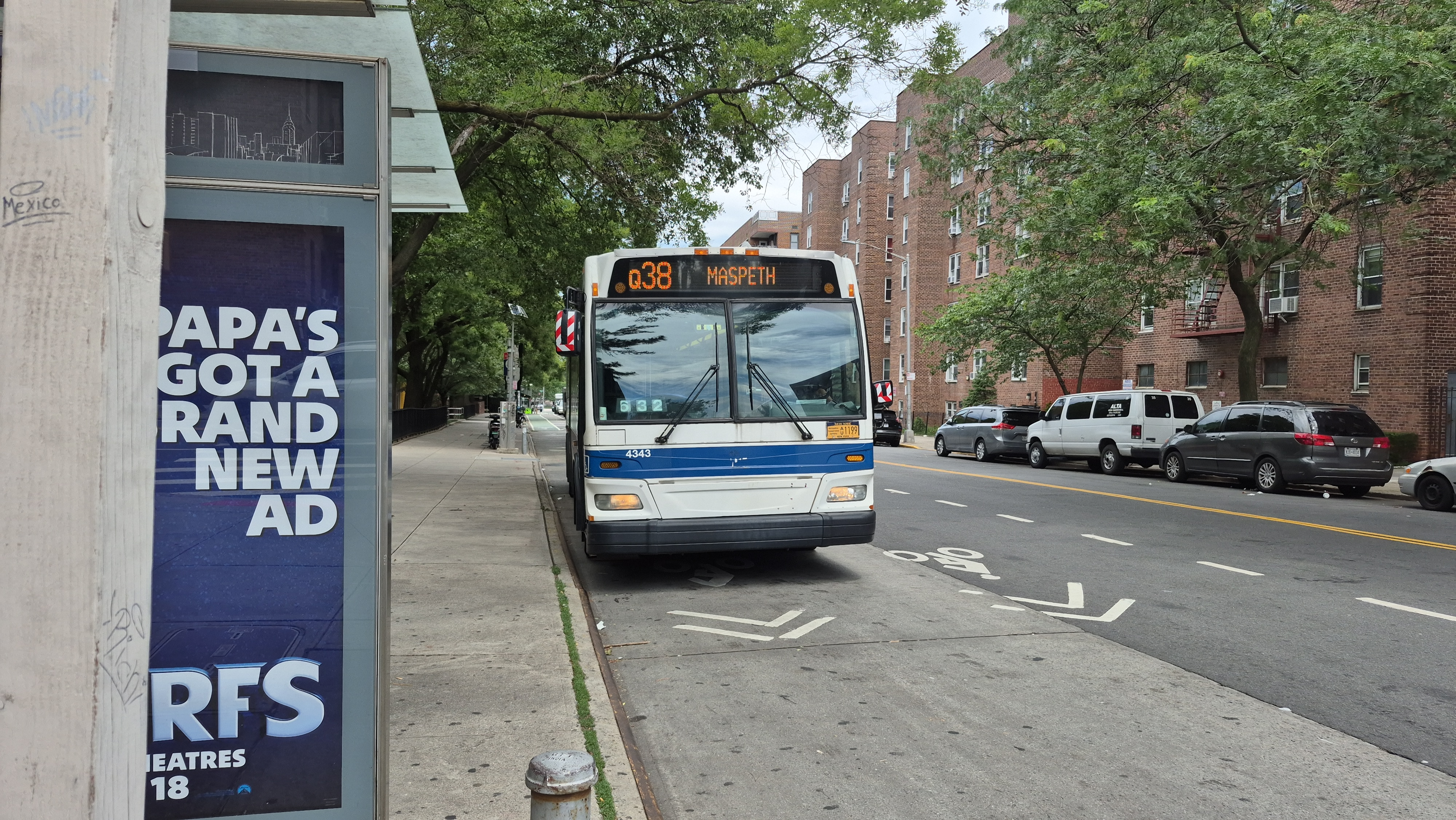
- 2019 XD40 #7764 on the Ridgewood-bound Q14 at Hoffman Drive/Woodhaven Boulevard and 2009 Orion 7 NG #4343 on the Maspeth-bound Q38 at 108th Street/62nd Drive in 2025

Overview
- System: MTA Regional Bus Operations
- Operator: New York City Transit Authority
- Garage: Fresh Pond Depot (Q14); Casey Stengel Depot (Q38)
- Vehicle: New Flyer Xcelsior XD40 (both routes); Nova Bus LFS; Orion VII NG HEV (Q38 only)
- Began service: June 17, 1934 (Q38 Penelope Avenue service); 1940s (Q45X/Q50 Eliot Avenue service); July 3, 1960 (Combined Penelope/Eliot service); June 29, 2025 (Q14 Eliot Avenue service)

Route
- Locale: Queens, New York, U.S.
- Communities served: Rego Park, LeFrak City, Forest Hills, Elmhurst, East Elmhurst, Corona, Middle Village, Maspeth, Ridgewood
- Landmarks served: Rego Center, Queens Center Mall
- Start: Q14: Ridgewood —Forest Avenue and Fairview Avenue; Q38: Maspeth – Metropolitan Avenue and Fresh Pond Road
- Via: Q14: Forest Avenue, Eliot Avenue, 103rd Street, 102nd / 104th Streets; Q38: Metropolitan Avenue, Penelope Avenue, 63rd Drive, 62nd Drive / 63rd Road
- End: Q14: East Elmhurst – 101st Street & 31st Avenue; Q38: Forest Hills – 62nd Drive & 108th Street
- Length: 6 miles (9.7 km) (Q14); 3.9 miles (6.3 km) (Q38)

Service
- Operates: All times except late nights
- Annual patronage: 1,022,359 (Q14, 2025); 1,339,758 (Q38, 2025)
- Transfers: Yes
- Timetable: Q14 Q38

The Q14 and Q38 are bus routes in Queens, New York City, that run from the western Queens neighborhood of Ridgewood to central Queens. From 1960 until 2025, they operated as a single "C"-shaped route, the Q38, running from the Corona and Elmhurst neighborhoods to the Forest Hills neighborhood, via the Metropolitan Avenue station in Middle Village. The Penelope Avenue section retains the Q38 designation, which terminates at Metropolitan Avenue/Fresh Pond Road, while the Eliot Avenue section is served by the Q14, providing connections to East Elmhurst and Ridgewood. Both routes run seven days a week but do not operate overnight. The routes are city-operated under the MTA New York City Transit brand of MTA Regional Bus Operations. As of 2025, the Q14 is operated out of the Fresh Pond Depot, while the Q38 is operated out of the Casey Stengel Depot as New York City Transit routes.

The Q38 was founded as two separate routes. The Penelope Avenue route was originally started by the Affiliated Bus Transit Corporation on June 17, 1934, as the Q38, which ran from East Elmhurst to the Metropolitan Avenue station. The Eliot Avenue portion of the line was a separate Triboro Coach route, which began operating in 1940 as alternate branches of the Q45 (now the southern half of the Q47). The Eliot Avenue portion was later split into its own route, the Q45X (later the Q50). The East Elmhurst branch of the old Q38 was truncated to Forest Hills by 1948. On July 3, 1960, the Penelope and Eliot Avenue routes were combined into a single route, the Q38. On June 29, 2025, service on Eliot Avenue was split off into the Q14, with extensions to East Elmhurst and Ridgewood.

== Route description and service ==
=== Q14 ===
An 2015 XD40 (7304) on the Q14 heading towards Ridgewood

The Q14 originates at the Forest Avenue station of the New York City Subway, traveling north along Forest Avenue in Ridgewood. It turns east onto Eliot Avenue, running into Middle Village. The Q14 continues down Eliot Avenue until Woodhaven Boulevard, then turns north a short distance on Woodhaven until Queens Boulevard. Here, the route serves the Queens Center Mall and the Woodhaven Boulevard station of the IND Queens Boulevard Line. The route continues east along 59th Avenue, then north on Junction Boulevard, east on 57th Avenue (passing LeFrak City), and north on 99th Street. In Corona, the Q14 turns left from 99th Street to Corona Avenue and right onto National Street, then continues onto 103rd Street when National Street ends at Roosevelt Avenue. In East Elmhurst, the Q14 makes a series of successive turns that resembles a hook shape. It turns left from 103rd Street onto 32nd Avenue, then turns right onto 101st Street, before terminating just before Astoria Boulevard.

Going towards Ridgewood from East Elmhurst, the southbound Q14 turns left from 31st Avenue onto 102nd Street. The Q14 continues south on 102nd Street until 37th Avenue, where it turns left. At 104th Street, it turns right, then the Q14 turns right at 43rd Avenue and left on 99th Street. It continues south on 99th Street, turning right on 57th Avenue, and left on Hoffman Drive to reach Woodhaven Boulevard. At Hoffman Drive and Queens Boulevard, it interchanges with the Woodhaven Boulevard station, and the Q11, Q29, Q52/Q53 SBS, Q59, Q60, Q88 and Q98 bus routes. The Q14 then turns right onto Woodhaven Boulevard, right onto Eliot Avenue to Middle Village, and left onto Forest Avenue in Ridgewood, terminating at the Forest Avenue station.

=== Q38 ===
The Q38 starts at 108th Street and 62nd Drive in Forest Hills, and travels west down 62nd Drive all the way until Queens Boulevard. Then it turns left onto Queens Boulevard for a block down and then turns right on 63rd Drive. Here, the route serves the 63rd Drive–Rego Park station of the IND Queens Boulevard Line and the Rego Center shopping complex. The route proceeds west along 63rd Drive past Woodhaven Boulevard, where 63rd Drive turns into Penelope Avenue, until 77th Place. Juniper Valley Park sits one block to the north at this location. The Q38 then travels in a zigzag pattern in which it turns left (south) onto 77th Place for a block, then right (west) on Furmanville Avenue, then left on 75th Place, then right on Juniper Valley Road, left on 69th Street, then right onto Metropolitan Avenue. Traveling west along Metropolitan, the route stops at the Middle Village–Metropolitan Avenue station of the BMT Myrtle Avenue Line, and the Metro Mall shopping center. It then terminates at Fresh Pond Road.

Going eastbound from Fresh Pond Road, the Q38 runs on Metropolitan Avenue, turns left at 69th Street, then begins the zigzag route via 69th Street, Juniper Valley Road, 75th Place, Furmanville Avenue, and 78th Street before turning east onto Penelope Avenue, which turns into 63rd Drive. At Queens Boulevard, 63rd Drive changes names again and becomes 63rd Road. The Q38 utilizes 63rd Road until 110th Street, then makes a left on 62nd Drive, terminating at 108th Street.

Both routes run one to two blocks away from the Juniper Valley Park, on opposite sides of the park. The two sections also run along the northern and southern edges of the Lutheran All Faiths Cemetery, respectively. The combined Q38 was operated by Triboro Coach when the MTA Bus Company took over operations in 2006.

== History ==
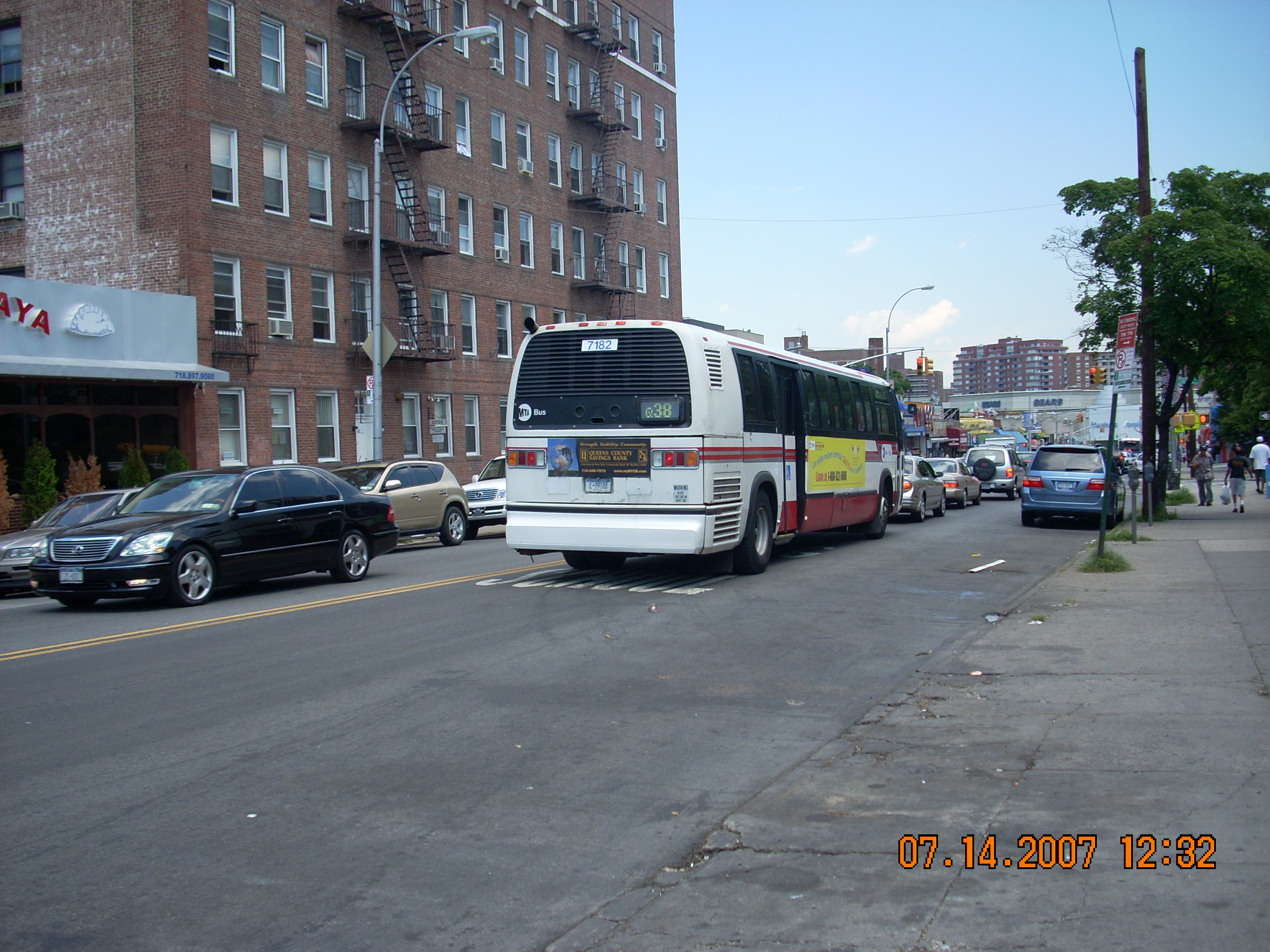
Rear view of a 1994 TMC RTS-06 (7182) on the Q38 near 63rd Drive-Rego Park, with Triboro Coach colors.

The Penelope Avenue route was originally started by the Affiliated Bus Transit Corporation on June 17, 1934, given the designation "Q-38" by the fall of that year. The original Q38 route began in East Elmhurst near Flushing Bay, running south down 108th Street, west on 62nd Drive and Apex Place. It then followed the current Q38 route through Rego Park, Forest Hills and Middle Village via 63rd Drive, Penelope Avenue, and the "zig-zag" pattern ending at the Metropolitan Avenue station. Later in 1934, the northern terminus was moved south to Corona at the 111th Street station of the IRT Flushing Line, running south along 111th Street and short portions of Corona Avenue and Colonial Avenue. It then followed 62nd Drive, Apex Place, and the current Q38 route to the Metropolitan Avenue station. Affiliated Bus operated the route on several temporary permits, before being granted a five-year contract from the city in November 1934. The route was acquired in 1936 by Triboro Coach Corporation, as part of the company's takeover of all routes within "Zone A" of Queens' four-zone bus system, covering greater Woodside. Affiliated Bus was not compensated for the takeover, as their equipment was considered obsolete. At the time, the roads along the route were much rougher and more difficult to traverse than in other parts of Queens; furthermore, the route received spotty service via Triboro Coach's oldest buses since it was deemed unprofitable. By 1948, the Corona portion of the Q38 was eliminated, and it was truncated to its current Forest Hills terminus at 108th Street.

The Eliot Avenue portion of the line was a separate Triboro Coach route. It initially operated as alternate branches of the Q45 (now the southern half of the Q47), which began service in 1940. Buses would run from Jackson Heights at the Victor Moore Bus Terminal to around Eliot Avenue and 80th Street, before turning southwest towards 69th Street at the Lutheran All Faiths Cemetery. An alternate routing turning north on Eliot towards Woodhaven Boulevard never operated. The service was referred to as the "Q45 Extension". The spurs later became a distinct route called the Q45X (short for "Q45 Extension") or the Q45 Eliot Avenue Line, running on Eliot Avenue from Woodhaven Boulevard south to 69th Street. By 1946, the route was renamed the Q50 (distinct from the current Q50 between Flushing and the Bronx).

In June 1947, Triboro Coach promised to extend the Q45X along Eliot Avenue between 69th Street and Myrtle Avenue by September. The Ridgewood Chamber of Commerce again recommended an extension of the Q45X from 69th Street and Eliot Avenue to Metropolitan Avenue and Eliot Avenue in April 1948 to provide connections to the Q39, the Metropolitan Avenue trolley, and the Flushing–Ridgewood trolley. The extension would also reduce the distance Grover Cleveland High School students would have to walk to school. In July, the president of Triboro Coach said his company was preparing an application for a franchise modification to the New York City Board of Estimate (NYCBOE) for this extension. The director of the Bureau of Franchises stated that the Chairman of the Board of Transportation had forwarded the Ridgewood Chamber of Commerce's request to his department. Triboro Coach made the application in September 1948. Local civic groups had been pushing for the extension for eight years. In January 1949, president of Triboro Coach announced that the expected arrival of ten new buses by the end of the month could make it possible for the extension to be implemented, contingent on a temporary permit. Triboro was also asking the Board of Estimate to legalize an extension on its northern end to the Rego Park Emergency Veterans Housing Project at 98th Street and 59th Avenue that had been operating on a temporary permit. In addition, the route would be renumbered from Q45X to Q50.

Around 1948 the route was extended north past Queens Boulevard to Corona in modern LeFrak City, and south to 60th Place and 62nd Avenue near Metropolitan Avenue. March 10, 1949 was set as a date for a Board of Estimate public hearing on the two proposed extensions of the Q45X in February 1949.

On July 3, 1960, the Penelope and Eliot Avenue routes were combined into a C-shaped loop service, with the Q38 designation retained for the entire route. It was nearly a full loop, as its terminals at Corona and Forest Hills were less than 0.5 miles (0.80 km) apart and located within a block of the Long Island Expressway to the north and south respectively. Before 1975, the Corona end of the route was extended east to Otis Avenue.

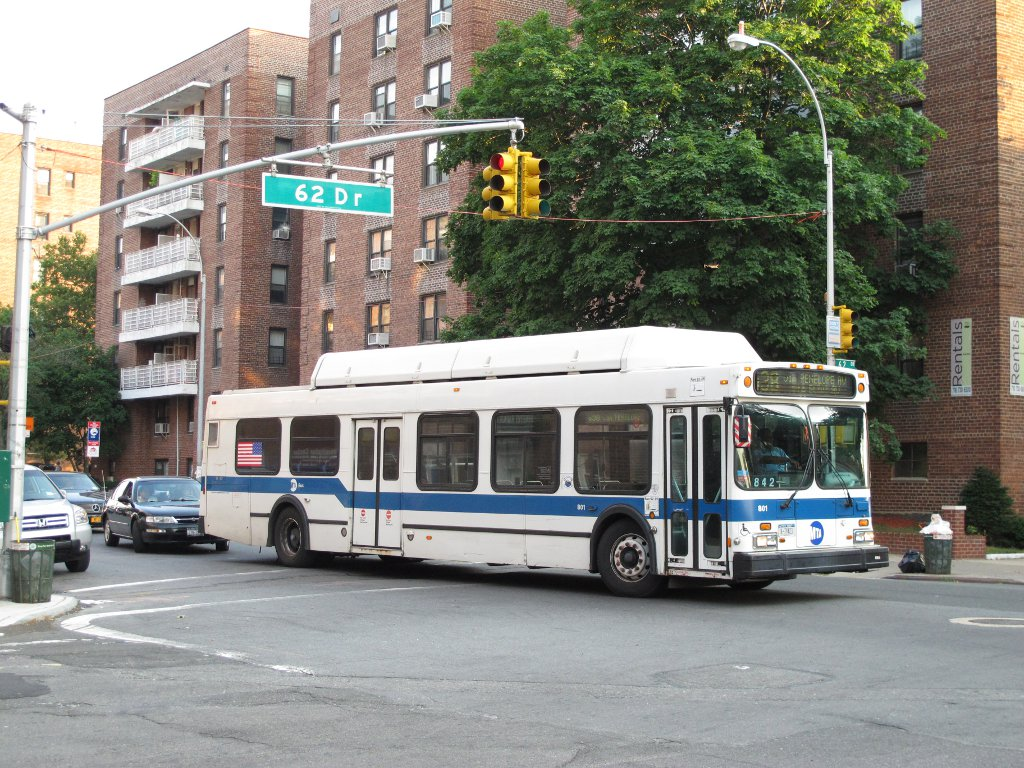
A 1999 C40LF (801) on the Q38 to Corona relaying in Rego Park.

On February 2, 2006, Triboro Coach ceased operations and the Q38, as well as all other routes operating under Triboro Coach, were picked up by the Metropolitan Transportation Authority (MTA). Fare structures were converted to those of the MTA. The former Triboro Coach depot in East Elmhurst became the LaGuardia Depot under MTA Bus.

=== Bus redesign ===
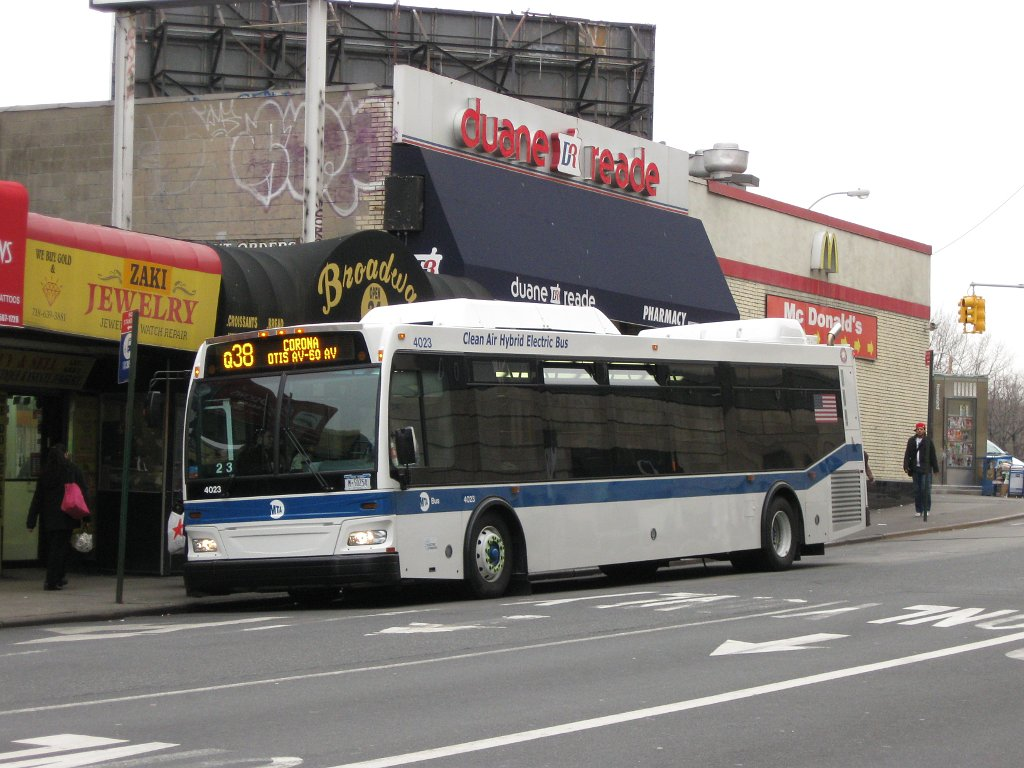
A 2009 Orion VII NG HEV (4023) on the Corona-bound Q38 near Queens Center Mall, before the Queens Bus Redesign

In December 2019, the MTA released a draft redesign of the Queens bus network. As part of the redesign, many parts of the Q38's route would have been discontinued. The Eliot Avenue section would have been replaced with the QT77, a "neighborhood" route running from Elmhurst to Long Island City, while the Penelope Avenue/63rd Drive section would have become the QT82, running from Glendale to East Elmhurst. The redesign was delayed due to the COVID-19 pandemic in New York City in 2020, and the original draft plan was dropped due to negative feedback.

A revised plan was released in March 2022. The Eliot Avenue/Corona branch of the Q38 would be split into a new route, the Q14, running from the Fresh Pond Road station in Ridgewood to Ditmars Boulevard in East Elmhurst. The Q14 would also take over part of the Q23 in Corona. The Q38 designation would still apply to the Rego Park branch, which would terminate at Metropolitan Avenue and Fresh Pond Road. In Middle Village, the Q38 would be straightened, running along Juniper Boulevard South from 69th Street to Dry Harbor Road.

A final bus-redesign plan was released in December 2023. The Eliot Avenue/Corona branch of the Q38 would be split into a new route, the Q14, which would be similar to the original Q14 proposal with minor changes. It would no longer connect with the M train in Ridgewood and would instead terminate at Fresh Pond Road/Eliot Avenue. The Rego Park branch of the Q38 would retain its existing zigzag routing along Juniper Valley Road and Penelope Avenue.

On December 17, 2024, addendums to the final plan were released. Bus stops on both routes were rearranged, and the Q14 received two more changes. Its southern terminal was extended to the Forest Avenue station to restore the southern connection with the M train, and its northern terminal was cut back to 31st Avenue since the Q23 would continue to run on Ditmars Boulevard. On January 29, 2025, the current plan was approved by the MTA Board, and the Queens Bus Redesign went into effect in two different phases during Summer 2025. Both routes are part of Phase I, which began on June 29, 2025. Under the redesign, the Q38 was transferred from MTA Bus Company to MTA New York City Transit.

== Connecting bus routes ==
- B13, B20 (at Putnam Avenue; Q14 only)
- Q39, Q54 (at Metropolitan Avenue)
- Q58, Q98 (at Fresh Pond Road)
- Q67 (at 69th Street)
- Q47 (at 80th Street)
- Q29 (at Woodhaven Boulevard/Dry Harbor Road)
- Q11, Q52 SBS, Q53 SBS, QM15, BM5 (at Woodhaven Boulevard)
- Q59, Q60 (at Queens Boulevard)
- Q72 (at Junction Boulevard)
- Q23 (at 108th Street; Q38 only)
- Q88 (at 92nd Street; Q14 only)
- Q63, Q66 (at Northern Boulevard; Q14 only)
- Q19, Q49 (at Astoria Boulevard; Q14 only)

== See also ==
- Triboro Coach Corporation
