= LaGuardia Airport subway extension =

Proposed New York City Subway extension

- The proposed extension would be serviced by the N and/or W.

Overview
- Status: Proposed

Service
- Type: Rapid transit
- System: New York City Subway
- Operator: New York City Transit Authority

Technical
- Character: Elevated

The LaGuardia Airport subway extension is a proposed extension of the New York City Subway's BMT Astoria Line (currently served by the N and W trains) to connect to LaGuardia Airport, which has never had an airport rail link. Such a connection was first proposed in 1943, when LaGuardia was already surrounded by development.

Two proposals during the 1990s and 2000s received funding. In 1990, the Metropolitan Transportation Authority (MTA) proposed a $1.6 billion, dedicated airport rail link from Midtown Manhattan to LaGuardia and John F. Kennedy airports, which would be developed by the Port Authority of New York and New Jersey (PANYNJ). The PANYNJ set aside $40 million for engineering and marketing before the line was canceled in 1995; part of the route became the AirTrain JFK people mover system. The MTA, PANYNJ, and federal, state, and local officials began considering another proposal in 1998, which would have entailed extending the Astoria Line. The plan received funding for construction in the early 2000s, but the plan was ultimately shelved in 2003 after opponents rejected the idea of constructing the extension through a residential area of Astoria.

In 2015, the planned AirTrain LaGuardia reflected a similar idea, although various media outlets criticized it as inferior due to its distance from the city, calling it a pet project of then-governor Andrew Cuomo. The AirTrain's future was placed in doubt after Cuomo's resignation in 2021, putting discussion of the subway extension back on the table, and the PANYNJ suggested the extension in a 2022 report. Despite this, the AirTrain was canceled in March 2023 and replaced with enhanced Q70 bus service, continuing to leave the airport without a rail link.

== Context ==
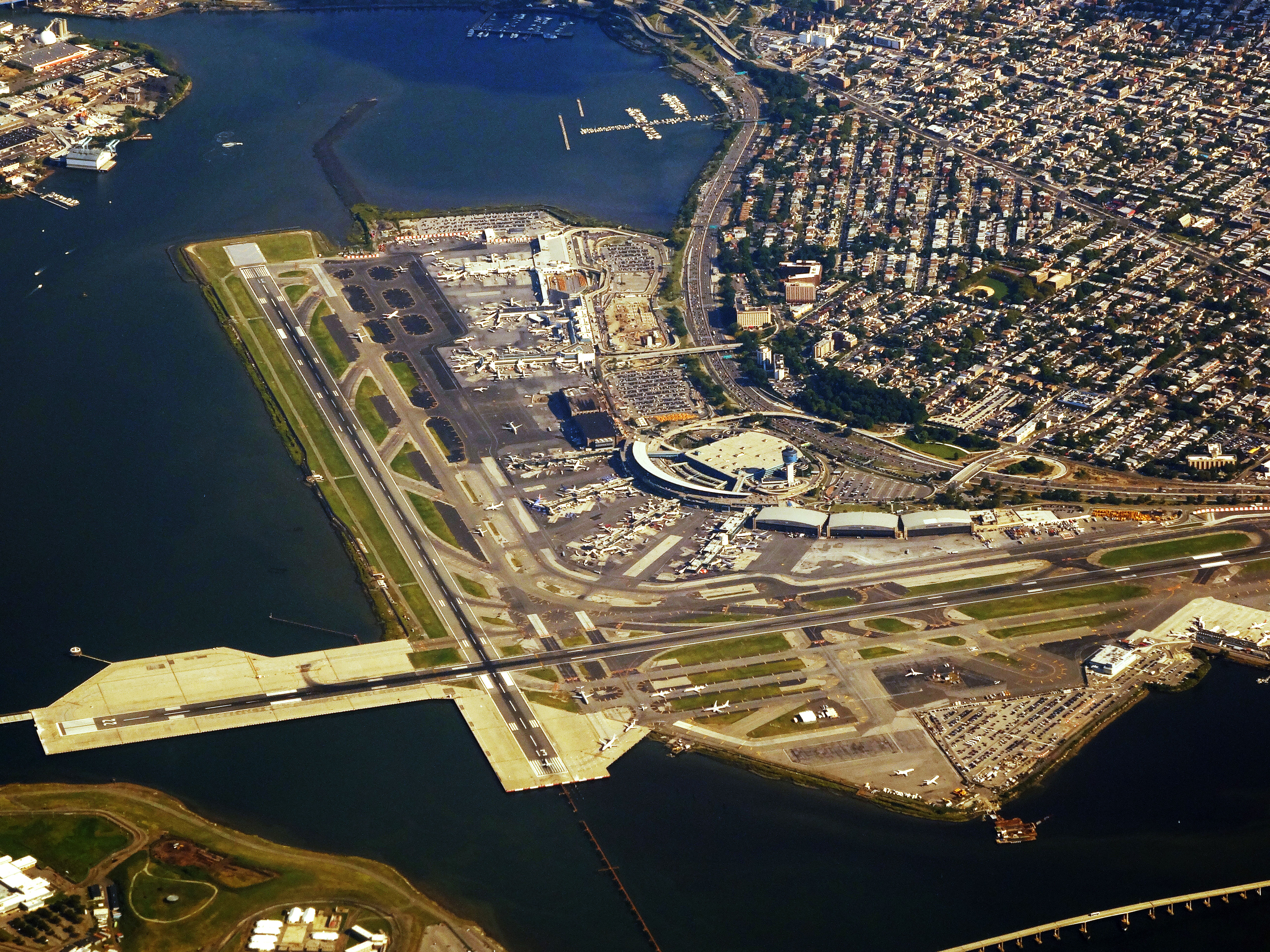
The proposed line would end at LaGuardia Airport (aerial view shown).

LaGuardia Airport, in the New York City borough of Queens, is considered the only major U.S. airport that is not served by train as of 2022. The nearest New York City Subway station to the airport is 3 miles (4.8 km) away. The M60 bus, which runs to Upper Manhattan, is the only public transportation route between Manhattan (the most densely populated New York City borough) and the airport. Of the 46.8% of travelers who go to LaGuardia from Manhattan, 89.3% of them arrive there by taxi, causing both pollution and traffic, while only 8.9% take the bus. Therefore, a rail link was seen as a priority to allow people to travel to the airport from Manhattan via public transport.

A subway extension had been proposed since 1943, when the city Board of Transportation suggested a post-war lengthening of the BMT Astoria Line from its terminus at the Astoria–Ditmars Boulevard station to LaGuardia Field. However, by the time LaGuardia became a public airport, it was already surrounded by development, requiring any subway lines to travel through residential areas and making construction difficult.

== Midtown–LaGuardia–JFK rail link ==
By the 1990s, there was demand for a direct rail link between Midtown Manhattan and John F. Kennedy International Airport. In 1990, the Metropolitan Transportation Authority (MTA) proposed a $1.6 billion rail link to LaGuardia and JFK airports, which would be developed by the Port Authority of New York and New Jersey (PANYNJ) and funded jointly by agencies in the federal, state, and city governments. The rail link, beginning at 59th Street and Lexington Avenue in Manhattan, was to cross the East River via the Queensboro Bridge. It would stop at Queens Plaza, then use the right-of-way of the Sunnyside Yards and Brooklyn-Queens Expressway to access LaGuardia Airport. After stopping at LaGuardia, the line would continue parallel to the Grand Central Parkway and an intermediate stop near Shea Stadium in Willets Point, with a connection to the 7 and <7> trains at Willets Point Boulevard. Continuing down the parkway, the line would have another intermediate stop in Jamaica, connecting to the LIRR at Jamaica Station, and then proceed nonstop down the Van Wyck Expressway to JFK Airport. The project would not have been an extension of the New York City Subway system—it would have been funded by a passenger facility charge, revenues from which could only be used to fund airport-related projects—but would have provided direct access to all of LaGuardia's terminals except the Marine Air Terminal.

In September 1991, Governor Mario Cuomo put his support behind this rail plan, which would cost $1.6 billion if built. Queens borough president Claire Shulman also endorsed the rail link. However, the Regional Plan Association opposed the link, with RPA leaders calling the plan "misguided". The East Side Coalition on Airport Access's executive director later said of the plan, "We are going to end up with another Second Avenue Subway, another 63rd Street tunnel, another uncompleted project in this city." After the PANYNJ found that the ridership demand might not justify the cost of the rail link, the MTA downgraded the project's priority. The PANYNJ started reviewing blueprints for the rail link in 1992; at the time, it was thought that the link could be partially open within six years.

The PANYNJ set aside $40 million for engineering and marketing of the new line in 1994 and created an environmental impact statement (EIS). The EIS, conducted by the New York State Department of Transportation and the Federal Aviation Administration (FAA), found the plan to be feasible. The PFC funds being collected by the Port Authority were supposed to fund the project's $2.6 billion budget. The project was to start in 1996, but there were disputes over where to locate the Manhattan terminal. Although the intersection of Lexington Avenue and 59th Street had been selected due to its high concentration of airport travelers, Manhattan community leaders were concerned over the volume of traffic that would result from building the terminal there. Many East Midtown residents opposed the Manhattan terminal outright because it would cause more limousine and taxi traffic in the neighborhood. It would remove two travel lanes from the Queensboro Bridge as well. The Port Authority did not consider a connection to Grand Central Terminal or Penn Station, which both had a higher ridership base, because such a connection would be too expensive and complicated. To pay for the project, the Port Authority would charge a one-way ticket price of between $9 and $12.

By February 1995, plans for the link were in jeopardy, as the cost of the proposed link had increased from $2.6 billion to over $3 billion in the previous year alone. This caused the Port Authority to consider abridging the rail link plan, seeking federal and state funding, or partnering with private investors. Mario Cuomo's successor, George Pataki, expressed skepticism about the JFK rail link's viability during the previous year's gubernatorial campaign. Instead of going to Manhattan directly, the rail link might have connected to Queens subway stations to reduce costs. The direct rail link between LaGuardia, JFK, and Manhattan was canceled outright in May 1995 because of its political unpopularity. The planned connection was downsized to a 7.5-mile (12.1 km) people mover that only served JFK Airport; this system, known as the AirTrain JFK, opened on December 17, 2003.

== 1998 proposal ==
=== Initial proposals ===
In July 1998, the MTA, the PANYNJ, and the offices of the Governor, mayor, and Queens Borough President signed a Memorandum of Agreement to improve airport access to LaGuardia Airport. As part of the agreement, they initiated the LaGuardia Airport Subway Access Study (LASA) to examine subway alternatives that could provide a one-seat ride between LaGuardia Airport and Manhattan's Central Business District, reduce travel times to the airport, and increase transit ridership. This study was planned as part of a $1.2 billion package to provide access to New York City-area airports. The preferred route would have extended the Astoria Line along 31st Street north onto Con Edison's property at the edge of Astoria and then east along 19th Avenue to the Marine Air Terminal. The MTA also considered an eastward extension along Ditmars Boulevard, and a plan to reroute LaGuardia-bound trains from Queensboro Plaza through the Sunnyside rail yard and along the eastern edge of St. Michael's Cemetery to elevated tracks parallel to the Grand Central Parkway. A fourth route was to have trains turn east via Astoria Boulevard. These options were studied in the LaGuardia Airport Subway Access Study (LASA). The MTA planned to produce a Draft Environmental Impact Study by December 1998, with a Final Environmental Impact Study ready in March 2000.

On March 30, 1999, a notice of intent to start an Alternative Analysis/Draft Environmental Impact Statement for the project was filed. Two subway extensions were initially considered: an alignment along 19th Avenue and a route along Sunnyside Yard, Hell Gate Line, and Brooklyn–Queens Expressway. In April 1999, the MTA issued a Scoping Memorandum for the LASA study and narrowed the project down to two options: the elevated extension of the Astoria Line from Ditmars Boulevard and the route through Sunnyside Yard. Though $100 million was pledged by the state for the project, additional funding was required to build either of the two remaining options. The 19th Avenue option was estimated to cost $1.04 billion, while the Sunnyside Yard alignment would have cost $1.8 billion. Since all four proposed extensions of the N to LaGuardia were strongly opposed by local residents, the MTA expanded the options outlined in the EIS in August 2000, examining 22 ways to improve transportation to the airport. These included four options for people movers, one for guided busways, one for the Metro-North Railroad, one for ferries, one for buses, three for the Long Island Rail Road (LIRR), and eleven for the subway. Two new alignments considered included an extension of the E or 7 via the LIRR Main Line, the Brooklyn-Queens Expressway and the Grand Central Parkway to the Airport's Central Terminal, and a line connecting to the 7 or the Port Washington Branch of the LIRR by looping around Willets Point into the airport's easternmost terminal. The study's options were expected to be narrowed in fall 2000.

On September 30, 1999, the MTA Board approved the agency's $17.5 billion 2000—2004 Capital Program, which included $645 million in funding for the extension of the Astoria Line to LaGuardia Airport. The inclusion of the extension was done at the request of mayor Rudy Giuliani, who included funding for the project in the city's budget for fiscal year 2000. In 1999, he proposed using $945 million of the city's contribution to the 2000—2004 and 2005—2009 Capital Programs for the LaGuardia extension, diverting funding that would have been used for state of good repair work. The funding would have covered preliminary engineering, final design, the construction of the line outside of the airport, and a portion of the cost for the line in the airport.. By March 2000, the AA/DEIS was expected to be completed in early 2001, with a preferred alternative to be selected later that year. The MTA had submitted an application to the Federal Transit Administration for federal funding for the selected alternative from the New Starts program.

=== Reception and cancellation ===
The plan was strongly backed by both the MTA and city officials, including mayor Rudy Giuliani and Queens borough president Claire Shulman. However, it faced "strong and united opposition" by a group described as "NAMBYs" (Not Above My Backyard), including Queens councilmember Peter Vallone Jr., who described the elevated railway as "19th century technology". Assemblymember Michael Gianaris also stated that the plan "belonged on the backburner", saying that he "doubted very much that a businessman in Manhattan would suffer the inconvenience of a train ride" as opposed to taking a taxi. Gianaris had recommended an alternate option, also supported by State Senator George Onorato, involving connecting the 7 train directly from Willets Point to LaGuardia so as not to travel through residential areas, although this plan was rejected by the city.

In June 2001, the MTA narrowed the alternatives to an extension of the N train, a people mover running to Ditmars Boulevard, and a guided busway via the Queensboro Bridge and the Grand Central Parkway. Extensions of the N were three of the four top rated alternatives; the other was a people mover option. Other options were eliminated since they were reliant on subway and rail lines already at capacity, or as they did not provide a one-seat ride to Lower Manhattan. The MTA at the time had $50 million allocated for the project's environmental review and engineering, and planned to spend $585 million on the line's construction in 2004. Following the September 11 attacks, the MTA redirected its focus to projects to rebuild Lower Manhattan, and deprioritized the extension to LaGuardia Airport. The MTA stopped working on the project in July 2003 due to significant opposition from the surrounding communities. The MTA announced in July 2004 that it would redistribute the $600 million in funding that had been allocated to the project.

== 2010s and 2020s proposal ==
In 2014, interest in the plan increased again, after it was mentioned following the announcement of the PATH extension to Newark Airport by transit blogger Ben Kabak, who noted that the N train ended just three miles from the airport. While Jeffrey Zupan, a senior fellow at the Regional Plan Association, described the possibility of the LaGuardia Airport extension as "not in your lifetime", the plans for LaGuardia's reconstruction included space for a direct subway line. In March 2022, the PANYNJ began studying 14 proposals for a replacement to the AirTrain, two of which involved extending the BMT Astoria Line. The PANYNJ also studied the possibility of light rail or dedicated bus lanes connecting to existing subway stations, as well as ferry service in conjunction with shuttle buses.

The AirTrain LGA project was canceled in March 2023 after the project's budget had increased to US$2.4 billion, over five times the original budget. The decision came after a panel of three transportation experts recommended that the frequency of the Q70 bus be increased and that the PANYNJ operate a shuttle bus route from the airport to the Astoria–Ditmars Boulevard station. According to Janette Sadik-Khan, one of the three panelists, the enhanced bus service would cost US$500 million. Sadik-Khan stated that "everybody loves the idea of a rail connection to the airport", but the panel suggested that extending the subway would cost as much as US$7 billion over 12 years and that it would not attract as many riders as better bus service. Patrick McGeehan of The New York Times called the bus plan a "familiar fallback", saying that speeding up buses in clogged streets was "not a small undertaking".

=== Proposals ===
Two separate proposals were noted in the PANYNJ's 2022 recommendation. Both require descending into a tunnel beneath one of the runways to give sufficient clearance for jets to take off.

==== Astoria–Ditmars Boulevard extension ====
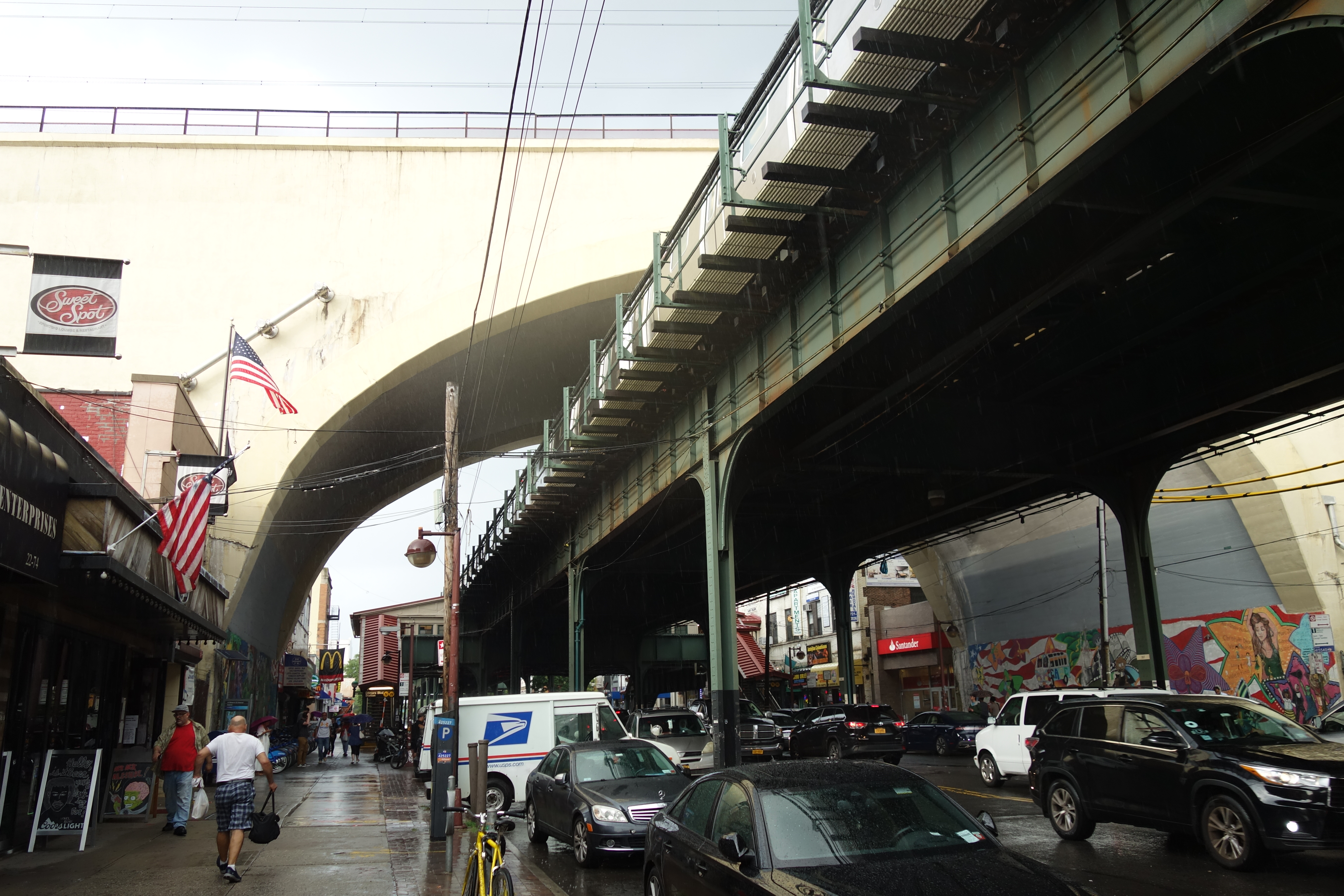
One proposal would continue up 31st Street from the current terminus at Astoria–Ditmars Boulevard.

Extending from Astoria–Ditmars Boulevard, the subway extension would proceed up 31st Street to 19th Avenue, then turn right. The elevated line would continue along 19th Avenue to the airport, stopping at Terminals B and C.

==== 30th Avenue extension ====
Branching from the 30th Avenue station, the train would be elevated above the Grand Central Parkway until reaching the airport, where it would similarly stop at Terminal B and C. This route avoids residential areas, but has notable drawbacks, including running beneath the Hell Gate Bridge trestle, hugging St. Michael's Cemetery, and splitting service to the Astoria–Ditmars Boulevard station. The Hell Gate issue was cited by FAA officials when they approved Cuomo's plan for the AirTrain.

=== Reception ===
The subway extension was seen by many as a better alternative to the AirTrain LaGuardia, due to various considerations, like not having to build a new maintenance facility to service a different type of train. In February 2017, in response to a surcharge plan for New York airport taxis, the Daily News stated in an editorial that an extension would offer a "one-seat ride" rather than a "taxing transfer", calling it superior to the AirTrain plan, and recommending that Q70 bus service retain a free transfer in the meantime. Jonathan Cohn, writing for the Daily News in 2023, said of the proposed Astoria Line extension: "The ability to easily identify an intuitive link, leveraging the existing mass transit system, is needed for people to use the transit option at scale, and would be invaluable for the city."

While Michael Gianaris stated opposition for the plan in 2003, he supported the 30th Avenue extension in 2021, as it did not "wreak havoc on some of our local streets". State Senator Jessica Ramos announced support for the plan in 2021, saying that she was supporting the plan "since I was a kid growing up in Astoria". She called Queens a "transportation desert", saying that extending the line would "serve those in the community".

== See also ==
- Proposed expansion of the New York City Subway
- 7 Subway Extension
- Second Avenue Subway
