= Mets–Willets Point =

Mets–Willets Point is the name of multiple train stations in the Flushing Meadows neighborhood of Queens, named for proximity to Willets Point, and to Citi Field, the home stadium of the New York Mets.

Mets–Willets Point can refer to the following:

- Mets–Willets Point station (IRT Flushing Line), formerly Willets Point–Shea Stadium, a stop on the New York City Subway
- Mets–Willets Point station (LIRR), formerly Shea Stadium, a stop on the Long Island Rail Road
- Mets–Willets Point, a proposed stop on the proposed AirTrain LaGuardia
