= AirTrain LaGuardia =

Unbuilt people mover system in New York City

- Rendering of AirTrain LaGuardia

Overview
- Status: Canceled
- Owner: Port Authority of New York and New Jersey
- Locale: Queens, New York City
- Termini: Mets–Willets Point stations (LIRR and subway); LaGuardia Airport
- Stations: 3

Service
- Type: People mover
- Operator(s): Port Authority of New York and New Jersey

Technical
- Line length: 1.5 mi (2.4 km)
- Character: Elevated

AirTrain LaGuardia was a proposed 1.5-mile-long (2.4 km) people mover system and elevated railway in New York City, United States, that would provide service to LaGuardia Airport in Queens. It would have connected with the New York City Subway and Long Island Rail Road (LIRR) in Willets Point, similar to how the existing AirTrain JFK system connects John F. Kennedy International Airport's five terminals to the LIRR in southern Queens at Jamaica station and to the subway at both Sutphin Boulevard–Archer Avenue–JFK Airport station and Howard Beach–JFK Airport station; and how the existing AirTrain Newark station connects Newark Liberty International Airport's three terminals to NJ Transit Rail Operations and Amtrak at a dedicated station.

The system was to have been constructed and operated under contract to the Port Authority of New York and New Jersey (PANYNJ), which operates the airport, and the Metropolitan Transportation Authority (MTA). In 2015, New York Governor Andrew Cuomo announced a plan to build a people mover similar to the AirTrain JFK, and in 2018, the New York State Legislature approved a law for the AirTrain LaGuardia project. Construction was to begin in 2021, with a projected opening in 2024; however, the project was indefinitely postponed in late 2021. In March 2023, the project was officially abandoned after the estimated cost reached $2.4 billion, five times the initial estimate.

The AirTrain project had been highly controversial. Advocates said that it would improve access to the airport from the subway and LIRR, alleviate traffic congestion, and reduce air pollution in and around East Elmhurst. The project was opposed by residents of nearby communities, as well as some transit advocates who objected to its indirect route to Midtown Manhattan, high cost estimate, and potential to prevent further rail transit connections to LaGuardia.

== Context ==
LaGuardia Airport had no rail service when the AirTrain was proposed in 2014. At the time, the only public transportation was via the Q47, Q70 SBS, Q72 and M60 SBS and old Q48 bus routes, all of which connect to the subway. The Q70 also connects to the LIRR at Woodside station, while the M60 SBS runs to Manhattan, connecting with the Metro-North Railroad at Harlem–125th Street station as well as with several subway routes. In 2014, 8% of LaGuardia's 27 million passengers took the bus, compared to the 12% of the 53 million passengers using John F. Kennedy International Airport who took AirTrain JFK. Similarly, in 2008, 75% of LaGuardia's passengers took a taxi or car service, but only 16% rode a bus or van.

The New York metropolitan area's other two major airports have rail connections. AirTrain Newark, the monorail at Newark Liberty International Airport, opened in 1996, has connected that airport to commuter trains since 2000. AirTrain JFK, the people mover at JFK Airport, opened in 2003. AirTrain LaGuardia was proposed to be a people mover like the one at JFK.

== Description ==
As planned, the AirTrain LaGuardia would have run from LaGuardia Airport with two stops within the airport, before running over the Grand Central Parkway for 1.5 miles (2.4 km) before terminating in Willets Point near Citi Field and Flushing Meadows–Corona Park, and would have connected there with the New York City Subway's 7 and <7> trains at the Mets–Willets Point station and with the Long Island Rail Road's Mets–Willets Point station. The AirTrain trip would have taken 6 minutes, and the LIRR ride to Manhattan would have taken another 20 minutes.

The Mets-Willets Point subway stop would have been rebuilt, and $50 million had been allocated toward planning and designing this work in the 2015–2019 MTA Capital Program. Also as part of that Capital Program, the LIRR stop was to have been rebuilt for $75 million. The subway station and the LIRR station were to have been integrated with nearby buses as part of the overhaul for greater intermodal connectivity. The station was planned to potentially hold ancillary airport functions, employee parking, and a Consolidated Rent-a-Car facility. To allow the construction of the Willets Point AirTrain station, the Casey Stengel Bus Depot was to have been relocated. $50 million was allocated in the 2015–2019 MTA Capital Program to acquire property for a replacement depot.

== History ==
=== Earlier proposals ===
A rail link to LaGuardia Airport had been proposed since 1943, when the city Board of Transportation proposed an extension of the New York City Subway's BMT Astoria Line (currently served by the N and W trains) from its terminus at Ditmars Boulevard. This was the first of 20 proposals for direct links to New York-area airports, all of which were canceled.

In 1990, the MTA proposed the New York City airport rail link to LaGuardia and JFK airports, which would be funded jointly by agencies in the federal, state, and city government. The rail line was to begin in Midtown Manhattan, crossing the East River via the Queensboro Bridge's lower-level outer roadways, which had been formerly used by trolley cars. It would stop at Queens Plaza, then use the right-of-way of the Sunnyside Yards and Brooklyn-Queens Expressway to access LaGuardia Airport. After stopping at LaGuardia, the line would continue parallel to the Grand Central Parkway with an intermediate stop near Shea Stadium in Willets Point, with a connection to the 7 and <7> trains at Willets Point Boulevard. Continuing down the parkway, the line would have another intermediate stop in Jamaica, connecting to the LIRR at Jamaica Station, and then proceed nonstop down the Van Wyck Expressway to JFK Airport. The Port Authority seriously considered the proposal, commissioning an environmental impact statement (EIS) for the rail link. However, due to rising costs, the Port Authority canceled the direct rail link between LaGuardia/JFK and Manhattan in May 1995.

Prior to the construction of AirTrain JFK in 1997, Mayor Rudy Giuliani opposed the AirTrain at JFK because of a monetary dispute between the state, city, and Port Authority. Giuliani wanted the Port Authority to study the possibility of extending the BMT Astoria Line to LaGuardia Airport, among other things. Later that year, Giuliani agreed to the AirTrain JFK plan, and the Port Authority agreed to conduct a feasibility study on a similar LaGuardia rail link. In 2003, $645 million was budgeted to extend the Astoria Line to the airport, but the extension was never built due to community opposition in Queens.

=== Planning and construction ===
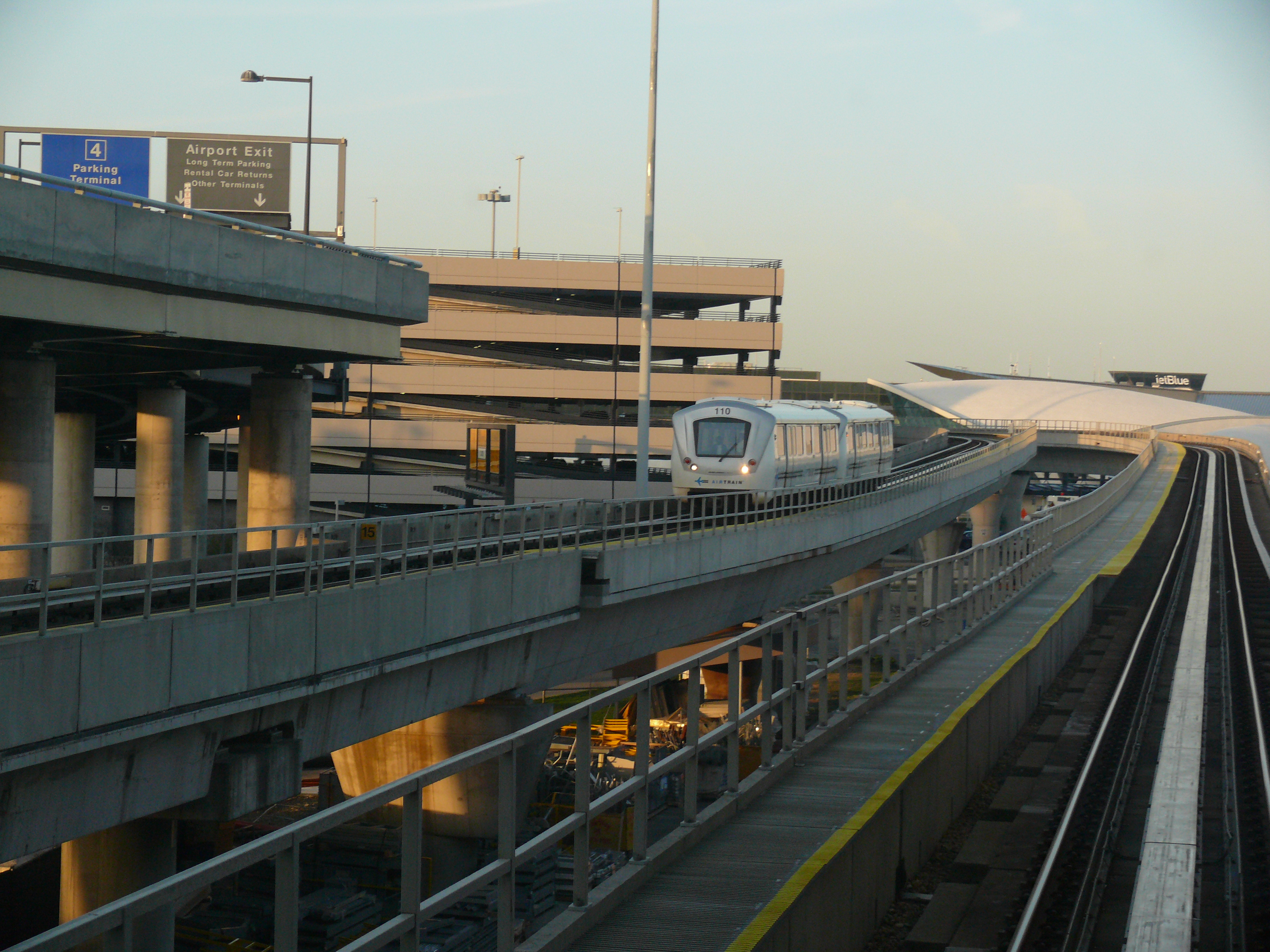
The AirTrain LaGuardia, as proposed, would be like the AirTrain JFK (pictured)

==== Plans ====
On January 20, 2015, New York Governor Andrew Cuomo announced a plan to build a people mover similar to AirTrain JFK. It would follow the Grand Central Parkway for one and a half miles, similar to how the AirTrain JFK runs along the median of the Van Wyck Expressway between Jamaica and JFK. The line would terminate in Willets Point near Citi Field and Flushing Meadows–Corona Park, and would connect there with the New York City Subway's 7 and <7> trains at the Mets–Willets Point station and, via an existing passenger bridge, with the Long Island Rail Road's Mets–Willets Point station on the Port Washington Branch. The governor's office estimated the cost for the project to be $450 million, which later increased to $1.5 billion. Unlike the other proposed AirTrain routings, the Willets Point route was to be located on government-owned land and would not require capture of private property.

The first contracts for the AirTrain itself were awarded in May 2016. A pair of contracts, totaling $7.5 million, were awarded for preliminary engineering work at the two Willets Point stations and expected to be completed in 2017. One contract, costing $4.6 million and awarded to STV Inc, was for studies of the LIRR station's platform lengthening and an ADA-accessibility retrofit. The other, a $2.9 million contract given to HDR Architecture and Engineering PC, was for studies regarding the subway station's complete renovation and ADA-accessibility. The airport renovation as a whole started construction on June 14, 2016. $1.5 billion was allocated for the construction of the rail link as part of the introduced 10-year $29.5 billion plan for the Port Authority. New York Commissioner Kenneth Lipper tried to have the plan amended with all funding for the AirTrain removed, citing concerns that the project would leave the agency in financial difficulty.

In January 2017, the PANYNJ released its 10-year capital plan that included AirTrain LaGuardia funding. Construction is projected to start in 2019, with passenger service in 2023. On February 6, 2017, the PANYNJ announced that it had opened a four-week-long request for proposals. The firm that is awarded the RFP would design three AirTrain stations—two inside the airport's new terminals and one at Willets Point—as well as plan the right of way from Willets Point to the airport. In May 2017, WSP USA was hired to design the AirTrain. The PANYNJ awarded another $55 million to the project in November 2017, bringing the total funds allocated for planning to $75 million. In April 2018, the Port Authority ruled out the possibility of routing the AirTrain along Grand Central Parkway, after consultation with residents of nearby East Elmhurst who opposed such a routing. The other options for routing the AirTrain included either placing it on a promenade adjacent to Flushing Bay, or over the bay itself.

==== Environmental impact statement ====
In June 2018, the New York State Legislature approved a law for the AirTrain LaGuardia project. This allowed the PANYNJ to start acquiring public land for the AirTrain's route, as well as for environmental impact studies to be conducted. Under the original plan, the AirTrain would start construction in 2020 and be complete by 2022. The Port Authority subsequently began environmental studies for three possible routings of the AirTrain to Willets Point, as well as the no-build alternative. Some residents and environmental groups opposed the project and requested results from the EIS upon its completion. Environmental groups worried that the AirTrain's construction would pollute Flushing Bay, which had just been cleaned at that point. A subsequent proposal to route the AirTrain over the waterfront was also met with opposition. Cuomo announced in May 2019 that the MTA would partially pay for the AirTrain's construction. By late 2019, the Port Authority was planning to award contracts for the AirTrain in 2021, with the line opening in 2024.

The Federal Aviation Administration released a draft EIS and opened public comments for the project in August 2020. In March 2021, the FAA released their final EIS on the project; at the time, work was supposed to commence in June 2021 and the AirTrain LGA would be opened by 2026. In June, the project was set for further review by the FAA after complaints that other options were not properly explored. The public provided 4,200 comments on the proposed Airtrain LGA before the FAA approved the project in July 2021. Several environmental lawsuits sued the FAA in September 2021, prompting the FAA to consider delaying the project.

=== Postponement and cancellation ===
When Kathy Hochul succeeded Cuomo as governor in late 2021, critics of the project called for her to cancel it. Hochul said in October 2021 that she had directed the PANYNJ to consider alternatives, and the authority presented 14 options in March 2022, including extending the BMT Astoria Line to provide service to the airport. Meanwhile, Hochul announced that, starting on May 1, 2022, the Q70 bus would no longer charge fares as a temporary measure while the New York state government studied alternatives to the AirTrain plan.

The AirTrain LGA project was canceled in March 2023 after the project's budget had increased to $2.4 billion, over five times the original $450 million estimate. The decision came after a panel of three transportation experts recommended that the frequency of the Q70 bus be increased and that the PANYNJ operate a shuttle bus route from the airport to the Astoria–Ditmars Boulevard station. The panel also suggested turning a mile-long section of the Brooklyn-Queens Expressway into a dedicated bus lane. According to Janette Sadik-Khan, one of the three panelists, the enhanced bus service would cost $500 million.

== Reception ==
The proposal had been strongly criticized by transit advocates as being slower than existing transit modes and likely to increase loads on the 7 and <7> trains, which already operate at full capacity. This would have been alleviated somewhat by the automation of trains on the IRT Flushing Line, which would have allowed more 7 and <7> trains to run every hour. However, the proposed AirTrain transfer at Willets Point would have been 20 stations away from the 34th Street–Hudson Yards station, the western terminus of the 7 and <7> trains (10 stations away via the rush-hour peak-direction express). It was estimated that transferring from the subway to the AirTrain would have taken longer than transferring from the subway to the Q70 LaGuardia Link bus at 61st Street–Woodside, which is eight local stops closer to Manhattan than the Willets Point station is. The AirTrain would also not have benefited many LIRR riders; the Port Washington Branch is the only LIRR route that does not go through Jamaica station, so riders from the rest of Long Island would have had to transfer at the Woodside station to access the Port Washington Branch.

According to one critic, even with a capacity increase, the route was not worth traveling due to its distance from most of the rest of the city, as "transit travel times from LaGuardia to destinations throughout New York City—from Grand Central in Midtown Manhattan to Borough Hall in downtown Brooklyn to Jamaica in central Queens to Yankee Stadium in the Bronx—would be longer for passengers using the AirTrain than for passengers using existing transit services already offered by the Metropolitan Transportation Authority." A writer from Slate called the project itself "dumb," saying that the project was a pet project for Cuomo and an "egregious misuse of money and initiative, in a city whose everyday transit functions are at capacity, to extend such a gift to airport travelers, of all people." The Village Voice called the project an "unmitigated disaster" for its convoluted, unwieldy route, and asked, "Why would [Cuomo] build [the AirTrain's] terminal at Willets Point, which is even further from the city than the airport itself?" One alternative suggestion involved the previously rejected proposal to extend the Astoria Line to LaGuardia Airport rather than building the AirTrain to Willets Point. Another critic called the $2.05 billion estimated construction cost "exorbitant" and proposed dedicated busways as a more direct and cost-effective solution.

In January 2020, U.S. Representative Alexandria Ocasio-Cortez, who represents Jackson Heights and East Elmhurst, wrote to the FAA asking why 46 alternatives were rejected and noting that over 60% of the 414 public comments collected by the FAA were in opposition to the proposed routing. Hiram Monserrate, the area's Democratic District Leader, also objected that the FAA's approval had bypassed a Uniform Land Use Review Procedure analysis, as would have been mandated for other large projects. The same month, residents and business owners along the AirTrain's proposed route protested against the construction of the AirTrain on that route.

Many government officials and advocates supported the plan. In 2017, the Newsday editorial board wrote a piece in support of the AirTrain LaGuardia project, saying that it would increase mass transit patronage to the airport. The board cited AirTrain JFK as an example, saying that "officials with the Port Authority of New York and New Jersey estimate the AirTrain provides 7.5 million rides to air travelers annually", and arguing that LaGuardia Airport needed a similar mass-transit airport link. Rick Cotton, executive of the Port Authority, said in an opinion article in the New York Daily News: "Let's stop talking about the red herring of 'doubling back' and focus on choosing the best route based on real issues, including the impact on neighborhoods, disruptions to highways, rail and utilities, and passenger experience, as well as cost." In 2020, a group of former New York City transportation commissioners wrote an op-ed in the Daily News in which they strongly supported the final AirTrain LaGuardia proposal. The commissioners wrote that the final proposal was the only viable option, saying that "the envisioned one-seat ride was never really one-seat" and that LaGuardia Airport was the only major New York City area airport without a train connection.

== See also ==
- Proposed expansion of the New York City Subway
