= Q70 (New York City bus) =

Bus route in Queens, New York

q70
- LaGuardia Link
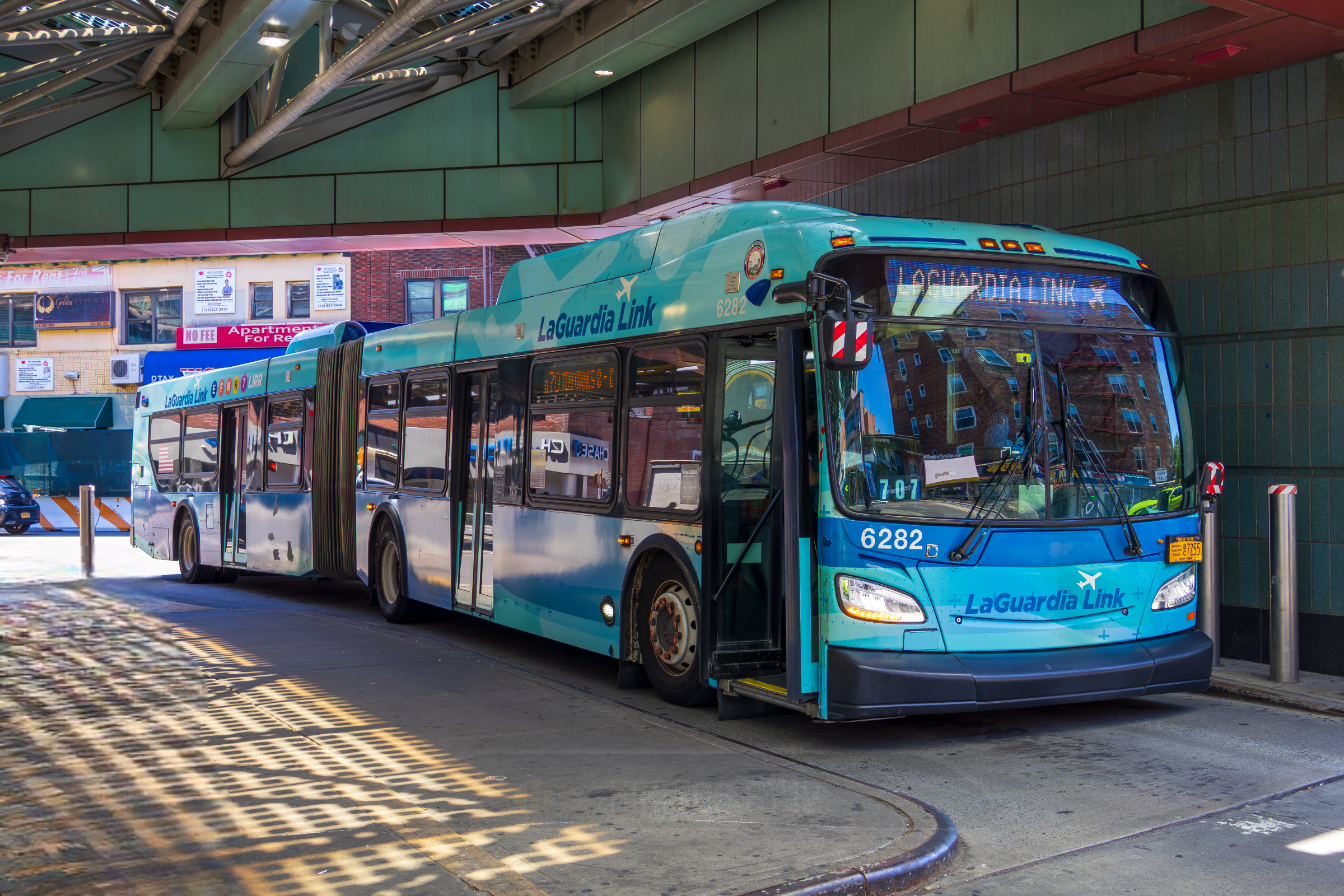
- 2020 NFI XD60 #6282 sits idle at the Victor A Moore Bus Terminal in Jackson Heights, NY in June 2026

Overview
- System: MTA Regional Bus Operations
- Operator: MTA Bus Company
- Garage: LaGuardia Depot
- Vehicle: New Flyer Xcelsior XD60 (main vehicle); New Flyer Xcelsior XD40; Nova Bus LFS (supplemental service)
- Livery: Select Bus Service / LaGuardia Link
- Began service: September 8, 2013 (Q70 limited-stop service); September 25, 2016 (LaGuardia Link Q70 SBS)

Route
- Locale: Queens, New York, U.S.
- Communities served: Woodside, Jackson Heights
- Start: Woodside – 61st Street and Roosevelt Avenue/ 61st Street–Woodside subway station ( 7 <7> trains) and Woodside LIRR station
- Via: Roosevelt Avenue, Brooklyn-Queens Expressway, Grand Central Parkway
- End: LaGuardia Airport
- Length: 4.5 miles (7.2 km)
- Other routes: Q33 82nd/83rd Streets

Service
- Operates: 24 hours
- Transfers: Yes
- Timetable: Q70 SBS

The LaGuardia Link Q70 Select Bus Service bus route is a public transit line in Queens, New York City, running primarily along the Brooklyn–Queens Expressway. It runs between the 61st Street–Woodside station—with transfers to the New York City Subway and Long Island Rail Road—and Terminals C and B at LaGuardia Airport, with intermediate stops at the Jackson Heights–Roosevelt Avenue/74th Street station and at 94th Street. This route is operated by MTA Regional Bus Operations under the MTA Bus Company brand.

The route was created on September 8, 2013, as a limited-stop route. The Q70 Limited bus was part of a program to create faster bus service between Woodside, Jackson Heights, and LaGuardia Airport. On September 25, 2016, it became a Select Bus Service route with the branding LaGuardia Link. The Q70 route started using articulated buses in June 2020 because of increased ridership, and it has been fare-free since April 2022. The Q70 served nearly 1.2 million passengers in 2014, the first full year of operation, which increased to nearly 1.95 million passengers in 2019. It has a daily ridership of 9,000.

== Route description and service ==
The Q70 starts in Woodside at 61st Street and Roosevelt Avenue, where a connection is available to the Long Island Rail Road at its Woodside station, and a transfer is available to the IRT Flushing Line (7 and <7> trains) at 61st Street–Woodside station. The route continues via Roosevelt Avenue until it reaches 74th Street at the junction of Woodside, Elmhurst, and Jackson Heights. Here, a transfer is available to the Flushing Line (7 train) and IND Queens Boulevard Line (E, F, <F>, M, and R trains) at Jackson Heights–Roosevelt Avenue/74th Street station; the Jackson Heights stop is the most heavily used stop on the route. The route then travels non-stop, running via Broadway before turning onto the Brooklyn–Queens Expressway and the Grand Central Parkway towards LaGuardia Airport. The Q70 serves the "Central Terminals", stopping at Terminal C, then Terminal B. (Note: It does not serve the Marine Air Terminal. The segment of the Q33 bus in LaGuardia Airport, which the Q70 replaced, also did not go through the Marine Air Terminal; as of 2025, the Q33 does serve the Marine Air Terminal, but not the other terminals.) The route then loops through the airport roadway and continues back to Jackson Heights and Woodside. On the return trip, the Q70 uses 75th Street and Woodside Avenue to travel between the Roosevelt Avenue/74th Street and 61st Street–Woodside subway stations.

The Q70 runs 24 hours a day. The buses that operate on the Q70 have special luggage racks for people traveling to and from the airport.

=== Stops ===
Station Street traveled	Direction	Connections
61st Street (Woodside Avenue)	Southbound terminus	LIRR: City Terminal Zone, Port Washington Branch at Woodside; MTA Bus: Q18, Q32, Q53 SBS; NYC Subway: trains at 61st Street–Woodside
62nd Street (Roosevelt Avenue)	Northbound station	LIRR: City Terminal Zone, Port Washington Branch at Woodside; MTA Bus: Q18, Q32, Q53 SBS; NYC Subway: trains at 61st Street–Woodside
Victor A. Moore Bus Terminal (Roosevelt Avenue and 74th Street)	Bidirectional	MTA Bus: Q32, Q33, Q47, Q49, Q53 SBS; NYC Subway: trains at Jackson Heights–Roosevelt Avenue/74th Street
94th Street	Airport stop	MTA Bus: Q72; NYC Bus: M60 SBS
Terminal C	Airport stop	MTA Bus: Q72; NYC Bus: Q90, M60 SBS; LGA Shuttle Bus
Terminal B	Airport stop	MTA Bus: Q72; NYC Bus: Q90, M60 SBS; LGA Shuttle Bus
Notes: 1. The route loops around LaGuardia Airport terminal bus stops and continues toward the southbound terminus at Woodside. There is no northbound terminus stand.

== History ==
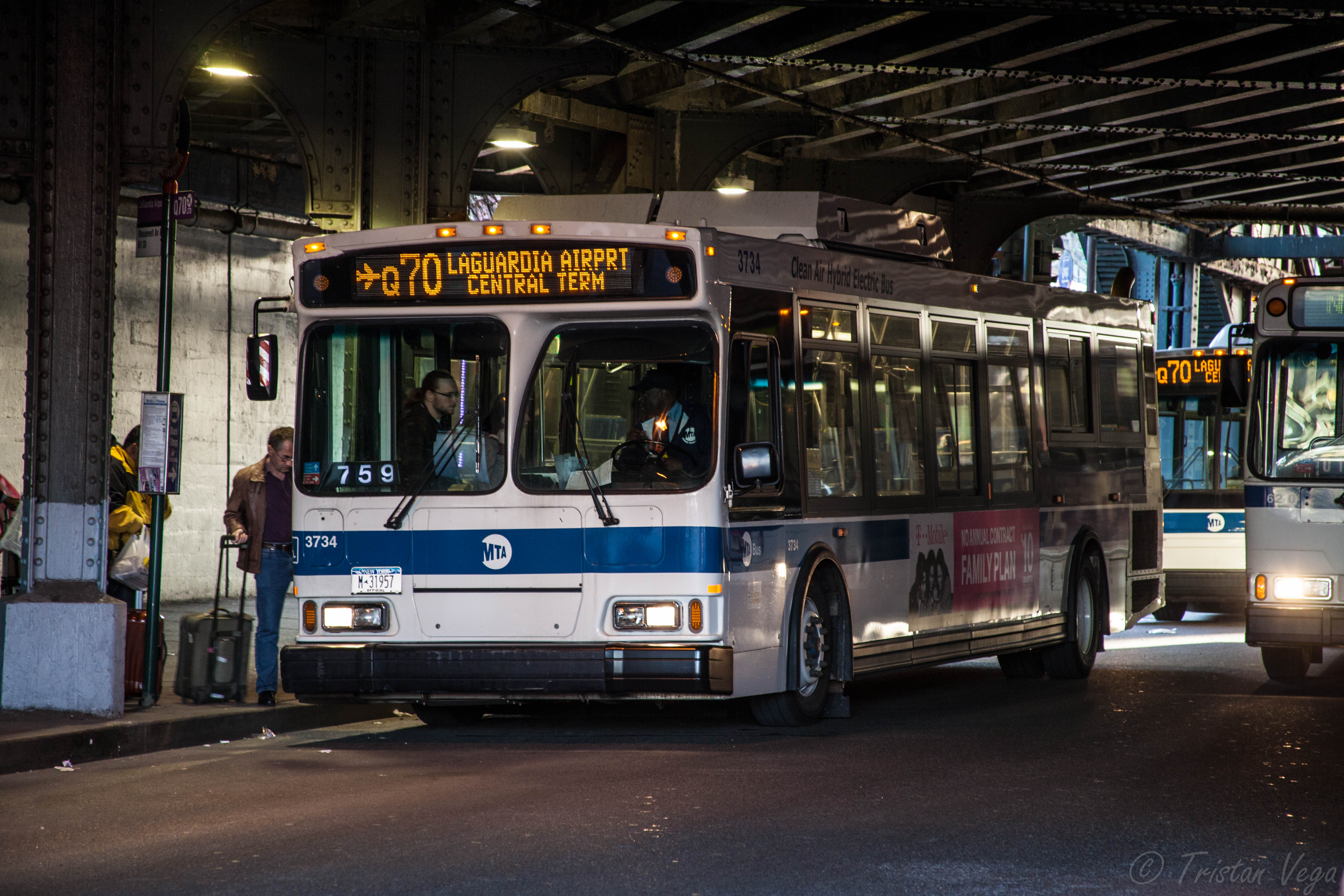
A 2007 Orion VII OG HEV (3734) and an NG HEV on the LaGuardia-bound Q70 exchanging passengers in Woodside, prior to SBS implementation.

=== Implementation of limited service ===
In 2009, under the Phase II of the city's Select Bus Service (SBS) program, faster bus service to LaGuardia Airport was recommended as a primary need. Under the LaGuardia Airport Access Alternatives Analysis study, another SBS study which was conducted by NYCDOT in partnership with MTA Bus, New York City Transit, and the Port Authority of New York and New Jersey in 2011–2012, it was recommended that a bus route should connect the central terminals of LaGuardia and transit hubs in Jackson Heights and Woodside. At these transit hubs, transfers could be made to the subway, Long Island Rail Road and buses from the new connector route. The reason for the creation of the study was the slow bus service on the M60, Q33, Q47, Q72 and old Q48, which all went to LaGuardia Airport. At the time, the airport was the New York area's only large airport without any rapid transit connections to Manhattan.

A new bus route running between Woodside and LaGuardia Airport via the Jackson Heights–Roosevelt Avenue/74th Street subway station was announced in October 2012. This was implemented on September 8, 2013, as the Q70 limited-stop route, which replaced the portion of the Q33 local bus that went to LaGuardia Airport. The Q33 was subsequently cut back to 95th Street and Ditmars Boulevard. The Q70 originally ran with 40-foot (12 m) buses.

In April 2016, in response to higher ridership, service on the Q70 was increased to run every 8 minutes instead of every 12 minutes during midday and PM peak hours. Weekend service began running every 10 minutes, and service during overnight hours was increased to run every 20 minutes from every 30 minutes.

=== Conversion to Select Bus Service ===
Mockup on an Orion VII OG for the proposed LaGuardia Subway Shuttle

Although the Q70 was intended as a bus rapid transit project, for its first three years of service it was not branded as Select Bus Service (SBS) and did not employ most SBS elements, lacking ticket machines, all-door boarding, branded buses, and dedicated bus lanes. The route was implemented as a limited-stop route instead, because there were regulatory issues preventing SBS implementation. It was also thought that in the interim, the combination of highway use and widely spaced stops would provide sufficient benefits.

The Q70 is one of three SBS routes that were planned under the LaGuardia Alternatives Analysis. The M60 became an SBS route on May 25, 2014, and the Bx41 SBS route had been planned to be extended to LaGuardia Airport under the LaGuardia Alternatives Analysis. However, the Bx41 extension has yet to be implemented due to a lack of funding. According to the city government, the three routes "would provide "shorter term, lower cost transit improvements" for LaGuardia Airport. Compared to the Q33 route between Jackson Heights and LaGuardia, it takes the Q70 40% less time to get to LaGuardia. The Q33 runs on local residential and commercial streets, which are frequently congested, resulting in slower service. The change, however, took direct airport service away from airport employees who live along the Q33 route in Jackson Heights, although MTA studies indicated that only a small portion of LaGuardia-bound passengers came from these areas. However, since its implementation in September 2013, daily ridership on the Q70 has more than doubled from 2,100 riders to 4,300 riders.

In November 2015, the Riders Alliance, an advocacy group for transit riders, issued a report suggesting that the Q70 be rebranded as the LaGuardia Subway Shuttle with no fares. The report mentioned that 85% of passengers using the Q70 already transferred to and from the subway, meaning that the bus brings no new revenue to the MTA. The group advocated for the rebranding of the route in conjunction with improved signage advertising for the route. Additional critiques made by the group are that the signage at LaGuardia for the Q70 is flawed and misleading, and that the bus stop locations on Roosevelt Avenue are not well marked. Increased service, bus running every 10 minutes during all times, countdown clocks and on-board announcements were all suggested by the group.

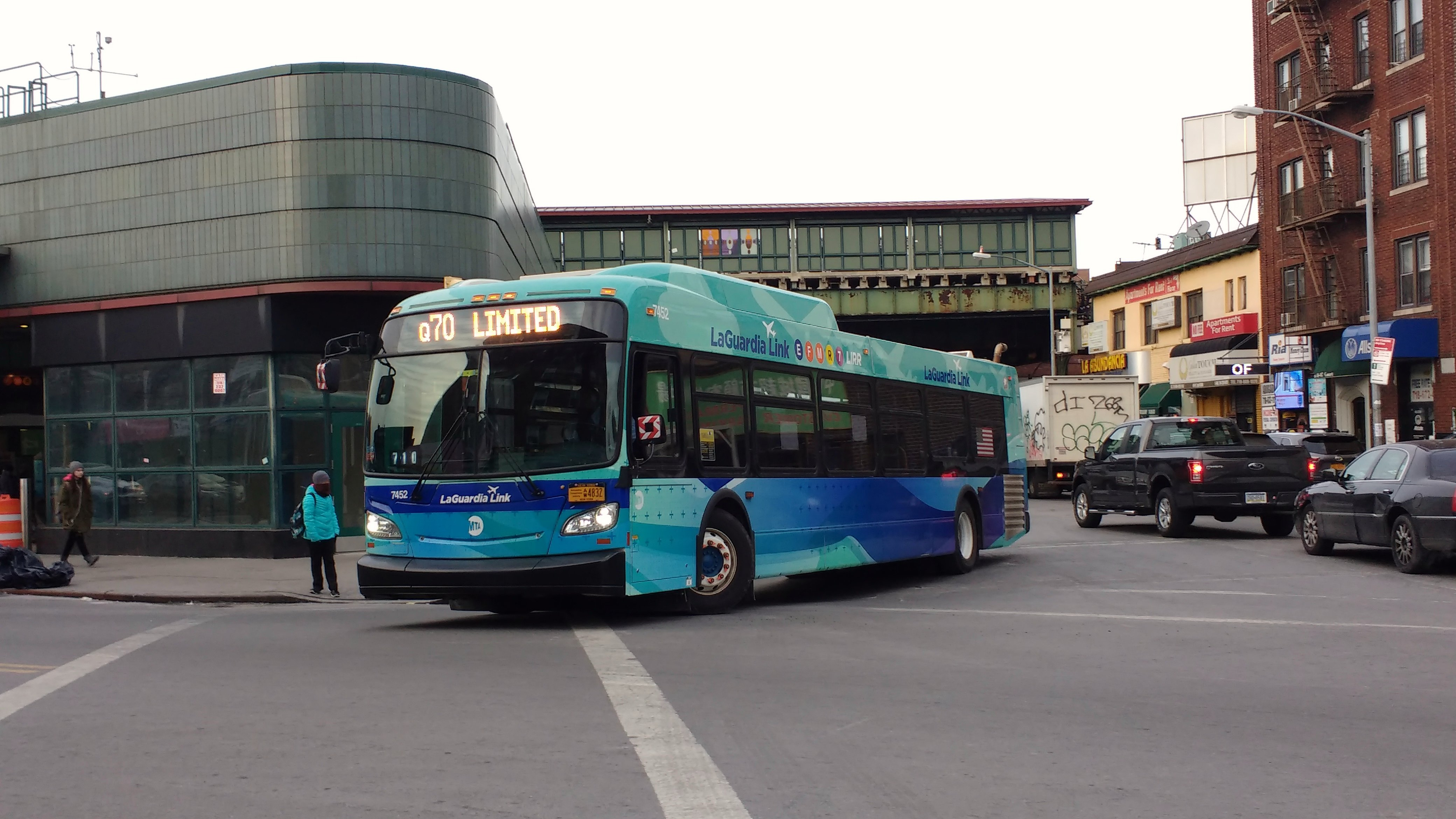
A 2015 XD40 (7452) on the Q70 Limited at 74th Street with the LaGuardia Link livery, just prior to SBS implementation.

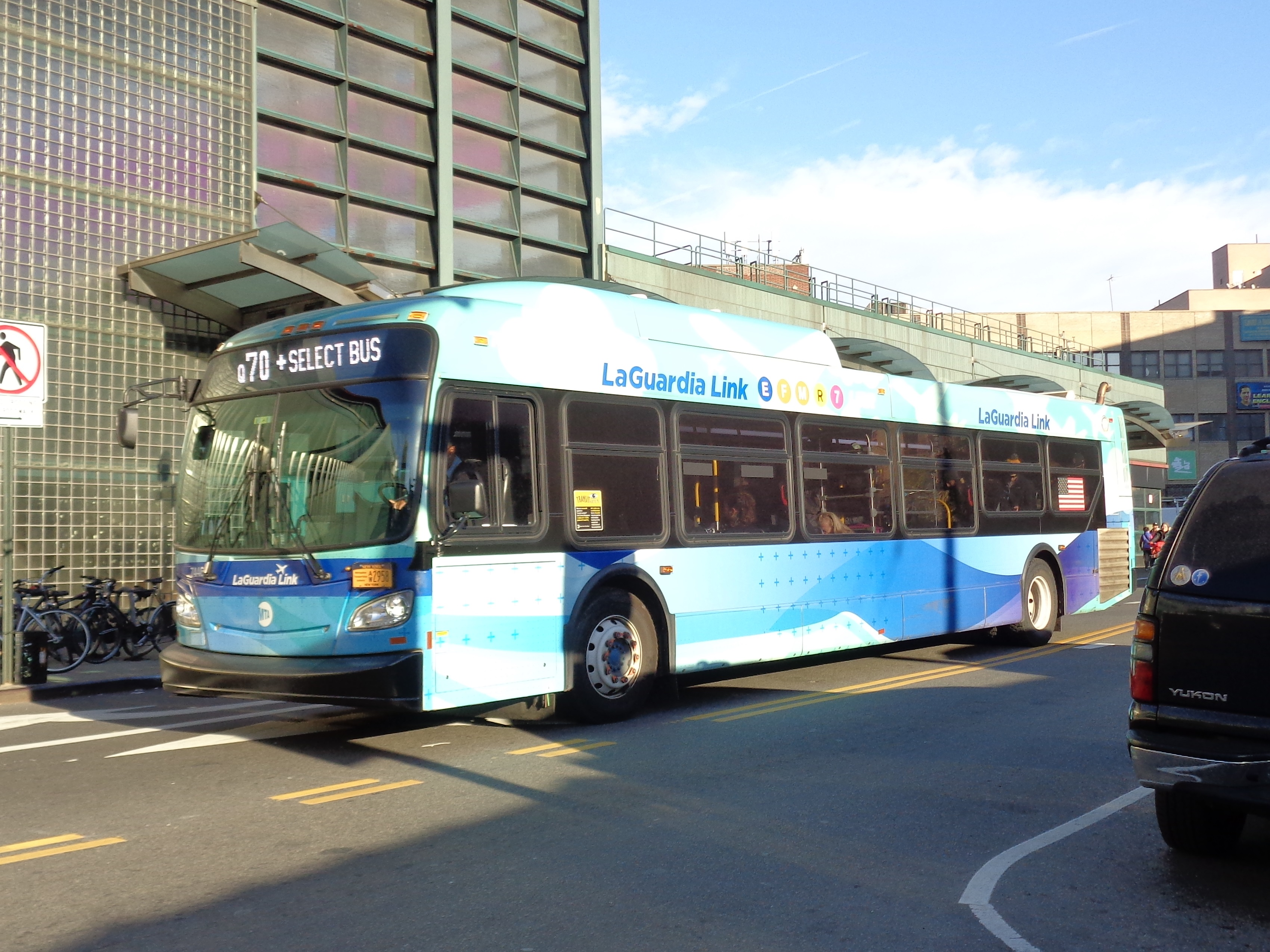
A 2015 XD40 (7446) on the Q70 SBS near Jackson Heights-Roosevelt Avenue, after SBS implementation

In December 2015, the MTA announced that the Q70 SBS would be implemented in September 2016, when it was rebranded as the LaGuardia Link with the implementation of off-board payment of fares. This is similar as to what the Riders Alliance proposed, but the route would still require a free transfer or a regular fare. As opposed to other SBS routes, the Q70 was to be wrapped in a teal blue scheme with silhouettes of clouds and airplanes. The buses would also have the text "LaGuardia Link" on the front, back, and both sides, in addition to the route emblems for the E, F, M, R, and 7 routes and the abbreviation "LIRR," which connect to the bus at Woodside–61st Street and at Jackson Heights–Roosevelt Avenue. The rebranding was to encourage more people to take public transportation when using the airport. The insides of the buses were to have air traveler branded messaging.

On September 25, 2016, Q70 Select Bus Service started with the route being branded as the LaGuardia Link, though the route kept its existing Q70 designation. The Q70 became MTA Bus's first SBS route; the change was expected to increase annual operating costs by $870,000. There is also the potential for traffic signal priority for the corridor on which the Q70 runs, which would speed up travel even further. The bus stop in Woodside was moved to the east to share a bus stop with the Q53 SBS, and the LaGuardia Airport-bound stop in Jackson Heights was relocated from its current location on 75th Street and Roosevelt Avenue into the 74th Street–Jackson Heights Intermodal Terminal (swapping stop locations with the Q47) to provide an easier transfer to the subway. A new marketing campaign is designed to raise awareness of the route, with print publications on certain airlines, an extensive social media campaign, in-flight Wi-Fi and video services, and with wall wraps in baggage claim areas in LaGuardia.

=== Subsequent changes ===
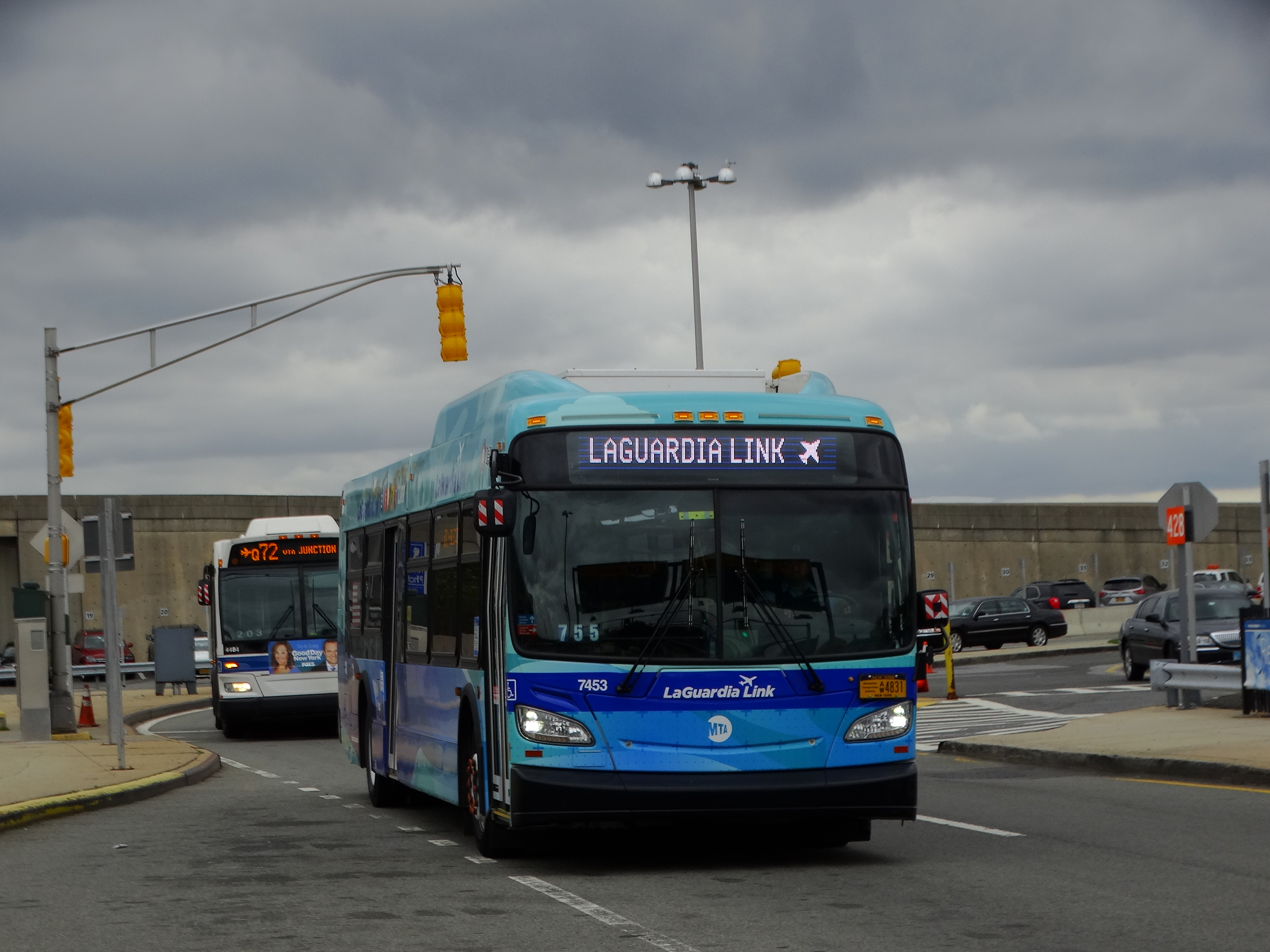
A 2015 XD40 (7453) on the Q70 SBS at LaGuardia Terminal D, displaying the "LaGuardia Link" designation, prior to the introduction of articulated buses

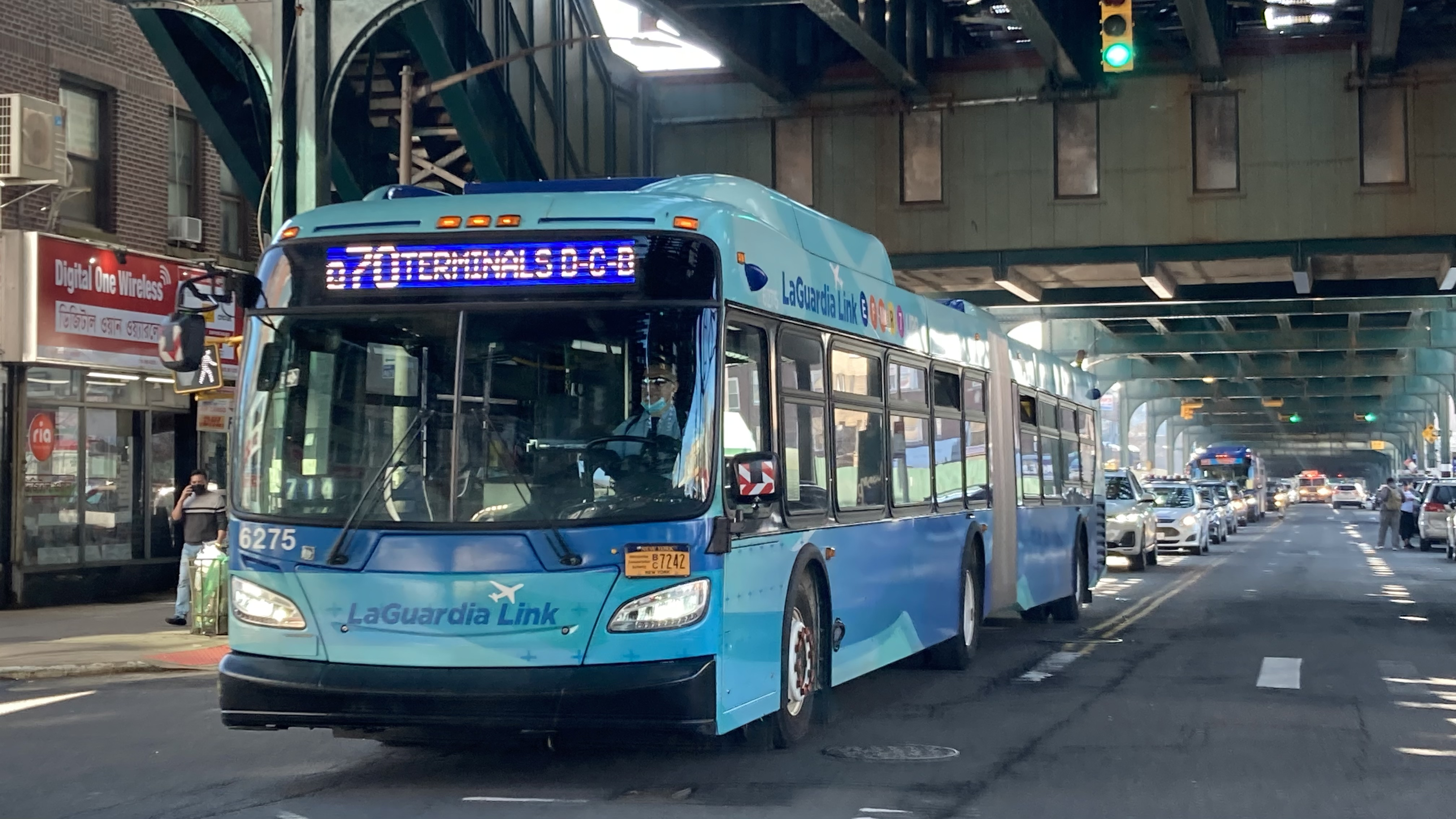
A 2020 XD60 (6275) on the Q70 SBS in Woodside following the introduction of articulated buses

Between 2016 and 2019, ridership on the Q70 SBS increased by 35%. In March 2020, MTA Bus proposed to the MTA Transit and Bus Committee that the Q70 fleet be converted to 60-foot (18 m) articulated buses due to increasing ridership. In conjunction with this action, the southbound path of the Q70 would be modified between 75th Street and 61st Street. Buses would run south on 75th Street and then west on Woodside Avenue without any intermediate stops, terminating at Woodside Avenue and 61st Street, some 250 feet (76 m) from the LIRR and subway station. This would eliminate a sharp turn at Broadway and 75th Street for southbound buses, as well as relocate the route onto less-congested streets. Furthermore, the terminus at 61st Street and Roosevelt Avenue would no longer be shared with the Q53 SBS route; the new articulated buses meant that there was not enough space to accommodate both routes at that terminal, since the Q53 also uses articulated buses. This change was expected to take effect in April 2020, but was instead implemented on June 28, 2020. The delay was due to uncertainties caused by the COVID-19 pandemic in New York City, which prevented the New York City Department of Transportation from installing the new bus stop at 61st Street.

==== Bus rapid transit upgrades ====
In April 2022, governor Kathy Hochul announced that the Q70 bus would no longer charge fares starting on May 1, 2022, while the New York state government studied alternatives to the planned AirTrain LaGuardia people-mover system. Previously, fares on the Q70 were periodically suspended during peak travel periods, such as Easter and Christmas, and many Q70 passengers already transferred to and from the subway for free.

The AirTrain LGA project was canceled in March 2023, after a panel of three transportation experts recommended that the frequency of the Q70 bus be increased and that another bus route, running to the Astoria–Ditmars Boulevard station, be operated by the Port Authority of New York and New Jersey (PANYNJ). The panel also suggested turning a mile-long section of the Brooklyn-Queens Expressway into a dedicated bus lane. According to Janette Sadik-Khan, one of the three panelists, the enhanced bus service would cost $500 million. In June 2023, the PANYNJ provided $30 million to fund the design of the enhanced bus service. In March 2025, state officials announced plans to spend $160 million to improve Q70 bus service. The changes included a dedicated bus lane on the Brooklyn–Queens Expressway, traffic signal priority in Jackson Heights, a bus bay at LaGuardia Airport, and increased midday frequencies. The MTA also announced plans to increase frequencies on the Q70 route starting in mid-2025. In May 2026, it was also announced that an eastbound center-running bus lane would be installed along Broadway between the Brooklyn-Queens Expressway and Roosevelt Avenue before the 2026 World Cup.

==== Queens bus redesign ====
In December 2019, the MTA released a draft redesign of the Queens bus network. The redesign was delayed due to the COVID-19 pandemic, and the original draft plan was dropped due to negative feedback for other routes. A revised plan was released in March 2022. The Q70 was the only route for which no modifications were made to the 2019 routing (the plan did not reflect the 2020 rerouting on Woodside Avenue). A final Queens bus redesign plan was released in December 2023. In the final bus redesign, the Q70's schedule and routing from 2020 was left unchanged; the westbound routing on Woodside Avenue was preserved. Nothing was changed under the addendums to the final plan either. On January 29, 2025, the current plan was approved by the MTA Board, and the Queens Bus Redesign went into effect in two different phases during Summer 2025.

== Ridership ==
In 2014, the first full year of operation, the Q70 served 1,185,485 passengers. By 2018, the Q70 had 1,704,485 passengers. This amounted to an average of 5,090 riders per weekday and an average of 7,280 riders per weekend. In 2022, the average weekday ridership of the Q70 Select Bus Service was 1,016. After the Q70 became fare-free, the MTA stopped counting ridership figures, since these figures are derived from the number of fare-paying passengers. By 2026, daily ridership was reported as 9,000.
