= Q72 (New York City bus) =

Bus route in Queens, New York

q72
- Junction Boulevard Line
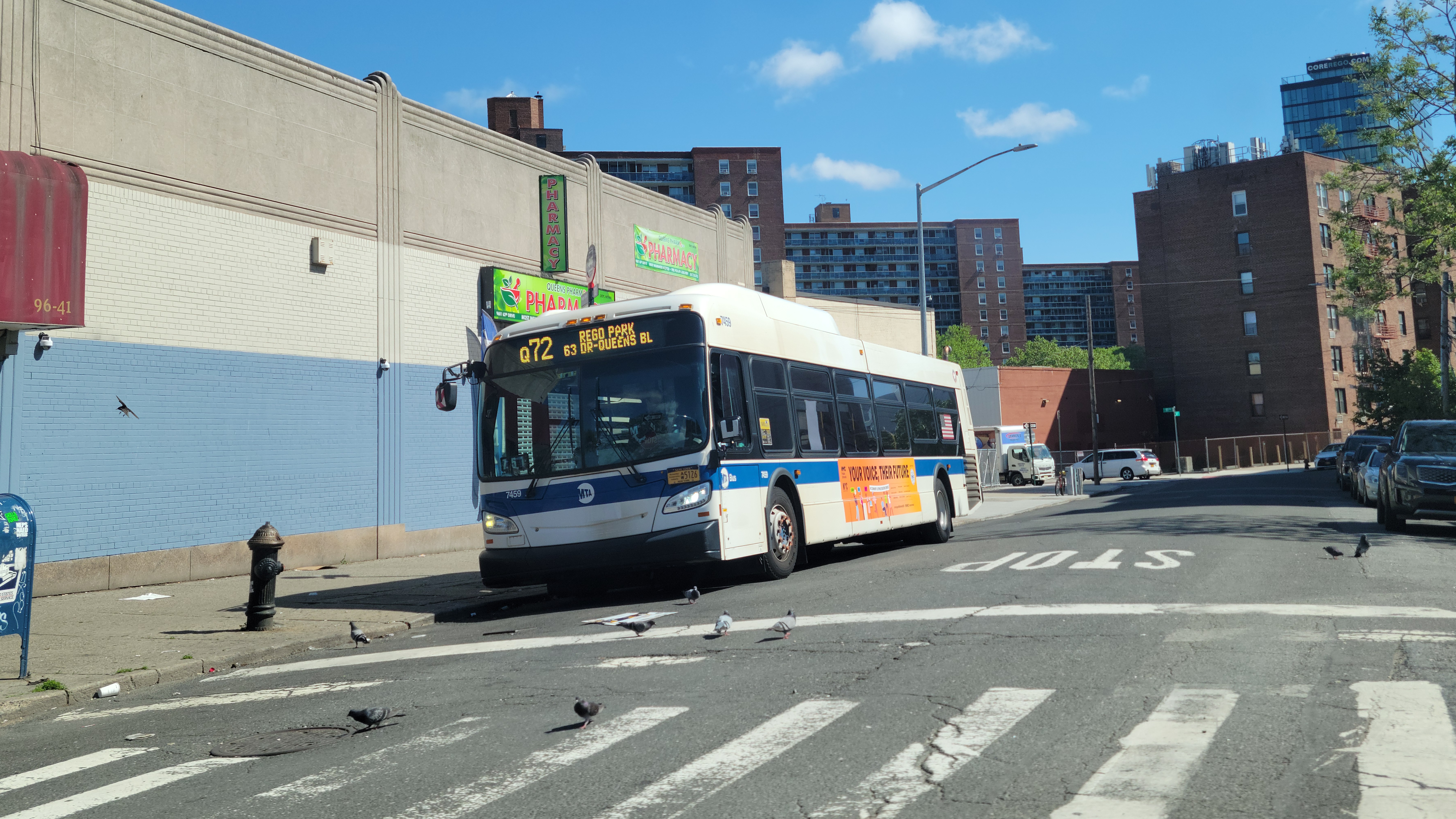
- A 2015 XD40 (7459) on the Rego Park-bound Q72 terminated at Queens Blvd/63rd Drive in May 2025

Overview
- System: MTA Regional Bus Operations
- Operator: MTA Bus Company
- Garage: LaGuardia Depot
- Vehicle: New Flyer Xcelsior XD40; Nova Bus LFS
- Began service: 1894 (trolley line); 1949 (bus)

Route
- Locale: Queens, New York, U.S.
- Communities served: Rego Park, LeFrak City, Elmhurst, Corona, Jackson Heights, East Elmhurst
- Start: Rego Park – 63rd Drive & Queens Boulevard (Rego Center)
- Via: Junction Boulevard, 94th Street
- End: LaGuardia Airport – Central Terminals or East Elmhurst – Ditmars Blvd (select rush hour runs)
- Length: 4.2 miles (6.8 km)

Service
- Operates: All times except late nights
- Annual patronage: 1,630,610 (2025)
- Transfers: Yes
- Timetable: Q72

The Q72 bus route constitutes a public transit route along Junction Boulevard and 94th Street in Queens, New York City. It operates between the Rego Park and East Elmhurst neighborhoods of Queens, and extends into LaGuardia Airport at the north end of the borough. It is city-operated under the MTA Bus Company brand of MTA Regional Bus Operations.

The route was originally a streetcar line known as the North Beach line or Junction Boulevard line running primarily on Junction Avenue, the predecessor to Junction Boulevard, to the resorts of Queens' North Beach on the Bowery Bay coastline. Service began in the late 1890s either as a standalone shuttle service or to facilitate through service between the Flushing–Ridgewood Line and Grand Street Line. All three lines were replaced by city buses in the 1940s, though the Junction Boulevard route would be privately operated by Triboro Coach from 1961 to 2006 when it was taken over by the MTA Bus Company.

== Route description and service ==
=== Streetcar line ===
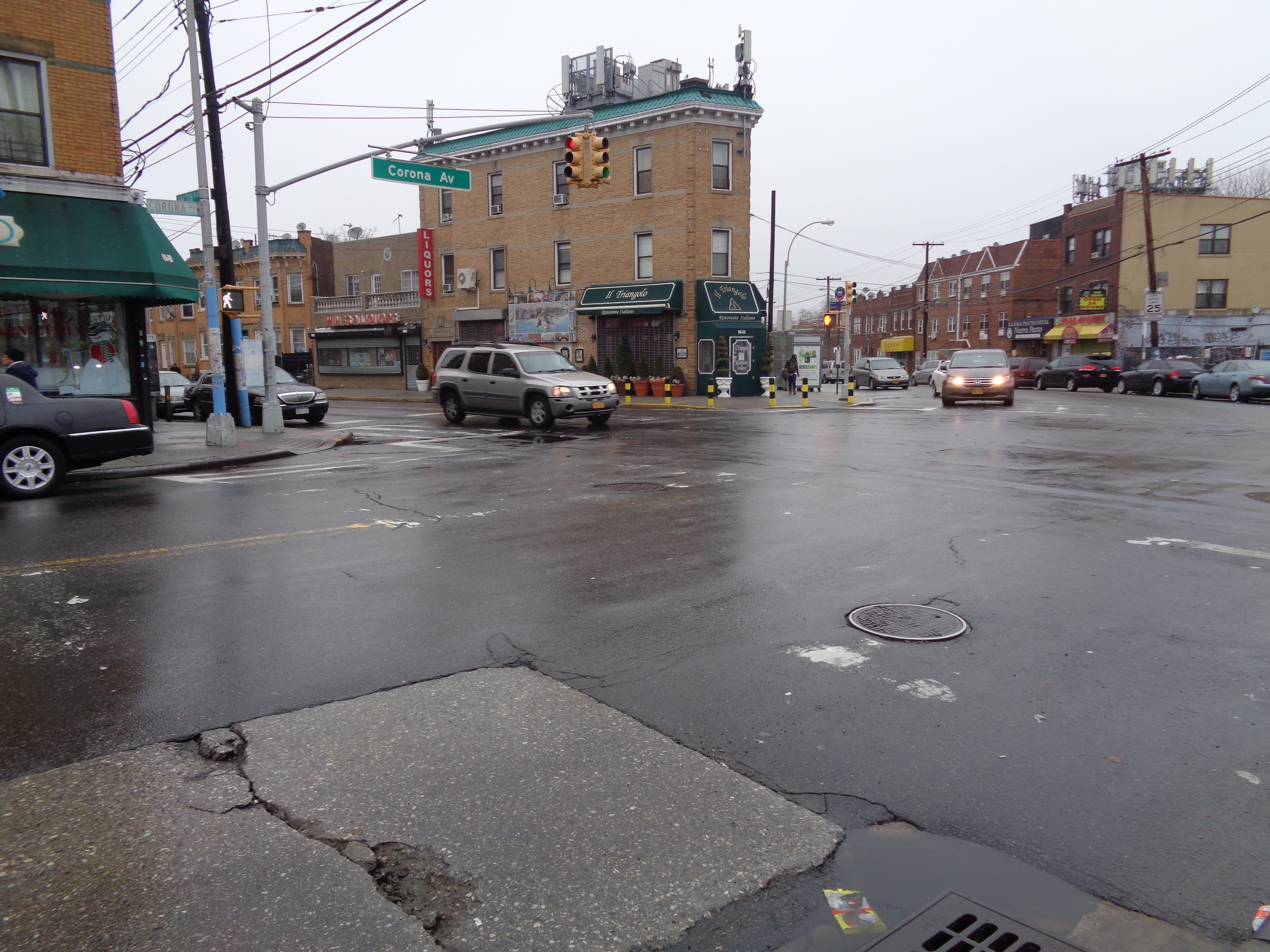
The former southern terminus of the streetcar line, at Junction Boulevard and Corona Avenue

Originally a branch of the Grand Street and Flushing–Ridgewood lines, the Junction Boulevard line, also known as the North Beach line began at the intersection of Corona Avenue and Junction Avenue (later Junction Boulevard) and traveled north along Junction to its terminus in Jackson Heights and Corona. It then turned east and north along Old Bowery Road (later Jackson Mill Road) through East Elmhurst, crossing Jackson Mill Pond and terminating at a loop at North Beach amusement area, a peninsula on the Bowery Bay coastline. This is the modern location of LaGuardia Airport. The line stopped serving the shoreline in the 1920s following the decline of the North Beach resorts. It was truncated to Ditmars Boulevard by 1939, and was never extended to serve LaGuardia Airport. The combined Grand Street/Grand Avenue and Junction Boulevard service was also known as the Maspeth−North Beach Line.

Between May 15, 1923 and October 27, 1925, the New York and Queens County Railway used the trackage of the Junction Boulevard line for service from their line on Northern Boulevard. Trolleys ran from the northern Queens neighborhoods of College Point and Flushing as well as the south Queens neighborhood of Jamaica, Queens to the Junction Boulevard station of the IRT Flushing Line at Roosevelt Avenue. The service ended when the Flushing Line was extended to 111th Street. The right-of-way of Jackson Mill Road today consists of 97th Street, the northern end of 94th Street, and several short and separate street sections which retain the name Jackson Mill Road.

=== Current bus service ===
The current Q72 service begins at Junction Boulevard and Queens Boulevard in Rego Park, adjacent to the Rego Center shopping complex and at the 63rd Drive station. It extends along the former trolley route on Junction Boulevard, then directly north on 94th Street to East Elmhurst and LaGuardia Airport. During rush hours, limited Q72 buses short-turn at 95th Street and Ditmars Boulevard. During early morning hours, at least one trip to LaGuardia Airport originates at Ditmars. Prior to 2006, the Q72 (like the streetcar line it replaced) terminated at Ditmars Boulevard just outside LaGuardia Airport. It only entered the airport on its first and final daily trips, during early morning and late night hours.

The Q72 only serves LaGuardia's Central Terminals (B and C) and does not serve the Marine Air Terminal. Service to the American Airlines hangar near Terminal B was eliminated on September 8, 2013. The Q72 operates out of the LaGuardia Depot, the former Triboro Coach depot, in East Elmhurst.

== History ==
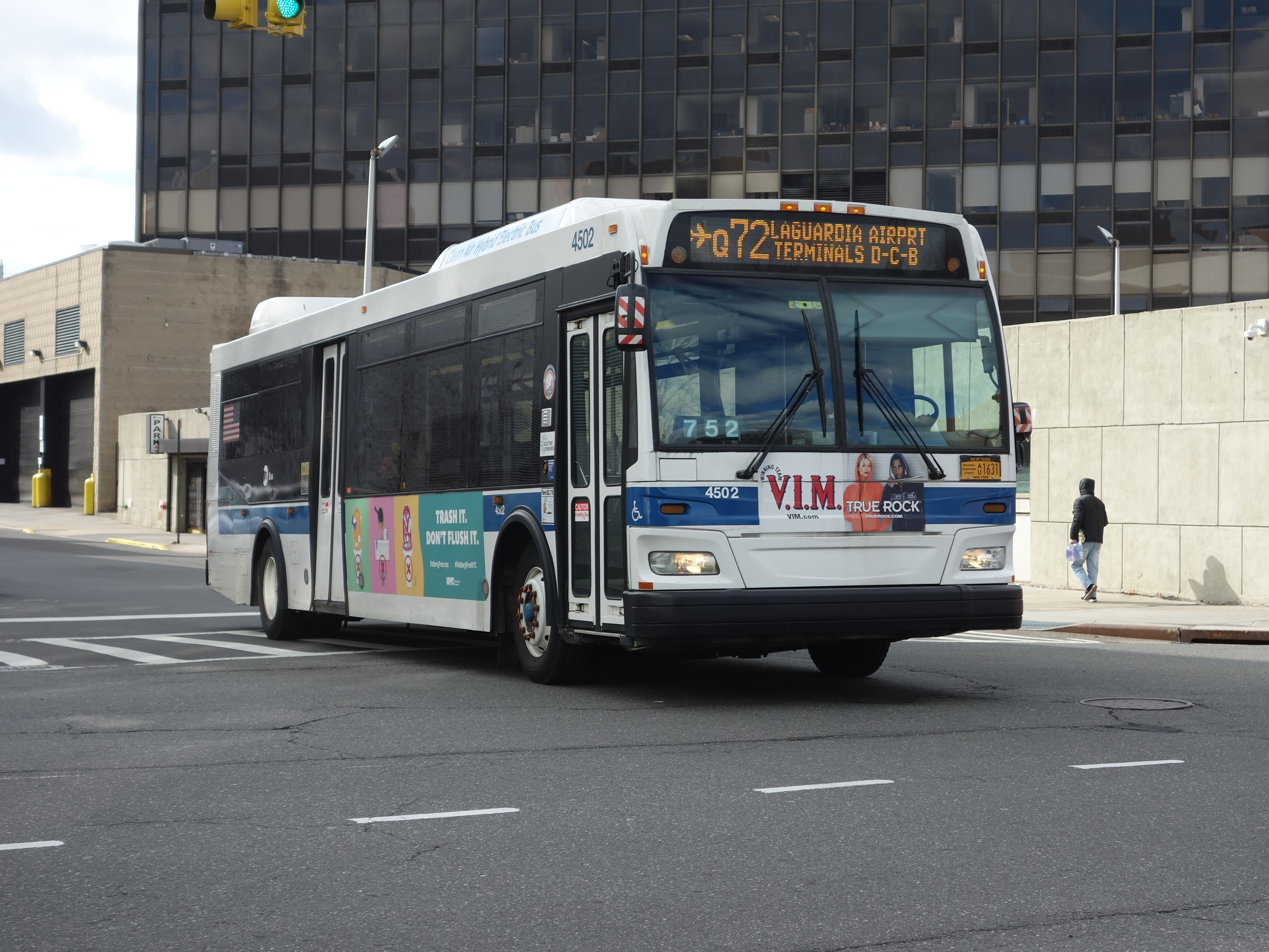
A 2009 Orion VII NG HEV (4502) on the LaGuardia Airport-bound Q72 at Junction Blvd/62nd Drive in Rego Park in March 2019

=== Streetcar line ===
On May 21, 1894, the Grand Street Line, operated by the Brooklyn Rapid Transit Company (BRT) and later Brooklyn–Manhattan Transit Corporation (BMT) subsidiary called the Brooklyn and Queens Transit Corporation (B&QT), began electrified service between Maspeth, Queens and ferries in western Brooklyn. On May 27, the line was extended east along Grand Avenue and Corona Avenue to Junction Avenue. On June 1, the line was extended north along Junction Avenue and Old Bowery Road to North Beach. The Junction Avenue line and other trolley lines to North Beach primarily served the Gala Amusement Park, owned by the Steinway family. On June 20, 1896, service on the Fresh Pond Road Line (predecessor to the Flushing–Ridgewood Line) was run between Ridgewood Terminal and North Beach. In November 1899, the Fresh Pond line was extended along Corona Avenue to Flushing, and the Junction Avenue line became part of the eastern portion of Grand Street service between the Maspeth Trolley Depot and North Beach. The line ran as a standalone shuttle service and facilitating through service from the Flushing–Ridgewood Line and Grand Street Line (now the Q58 and Q59 buses respectively) to central Queens and Brooklyn.

In the 1920s, due to the prohibition movement in the United States and pollution in Bowery Bay, the resorts at North Beach closed and the Junction line was truncated south of the former amusement area. In 1929, the Junction line was split from Grand Avenue service, becoming a shuttle between Corona Avenue and East Elmhurst. During the 1920s and 1930s, more conventional grid plans were laid down in Jackson Heights, Corona, and East Elmhurst. The winding and circuitous Jackson Mill Road, however, was preserved due to the presence of the streetcar line. In 1935, the Junction Boulevard line was rebuilt. The former dirt roadbed was replaced with concrete, to go along with heavier rails and improved trolley wire. In late 1936, Grand Avenue service was once again extended along Junction Boulevard. In 1938, the City of New York notified the B&QT to abandon the remaining line north of the planned Grand Central Parkway in the North Beach vicinity, due to the construction of the New York Municipal Airport on the Glenn H. Curtiss/North Beach Airport site which replaced the resort area. Due to conflicts with the city over a potential extension to the new municipal airport, the Junction line was never extended to the facility. The last trolley to North Beach ran on December 9, 1938, after which service was truncated to Ditmars Boulevard at the south end of the 94th Street overpass over the Grand Central Parkway. The airport, later named LaGuardia Airport, opened on October 15, 1939, with special B&QT bus service between the trolleys and the Airport.

=== Bus service ===
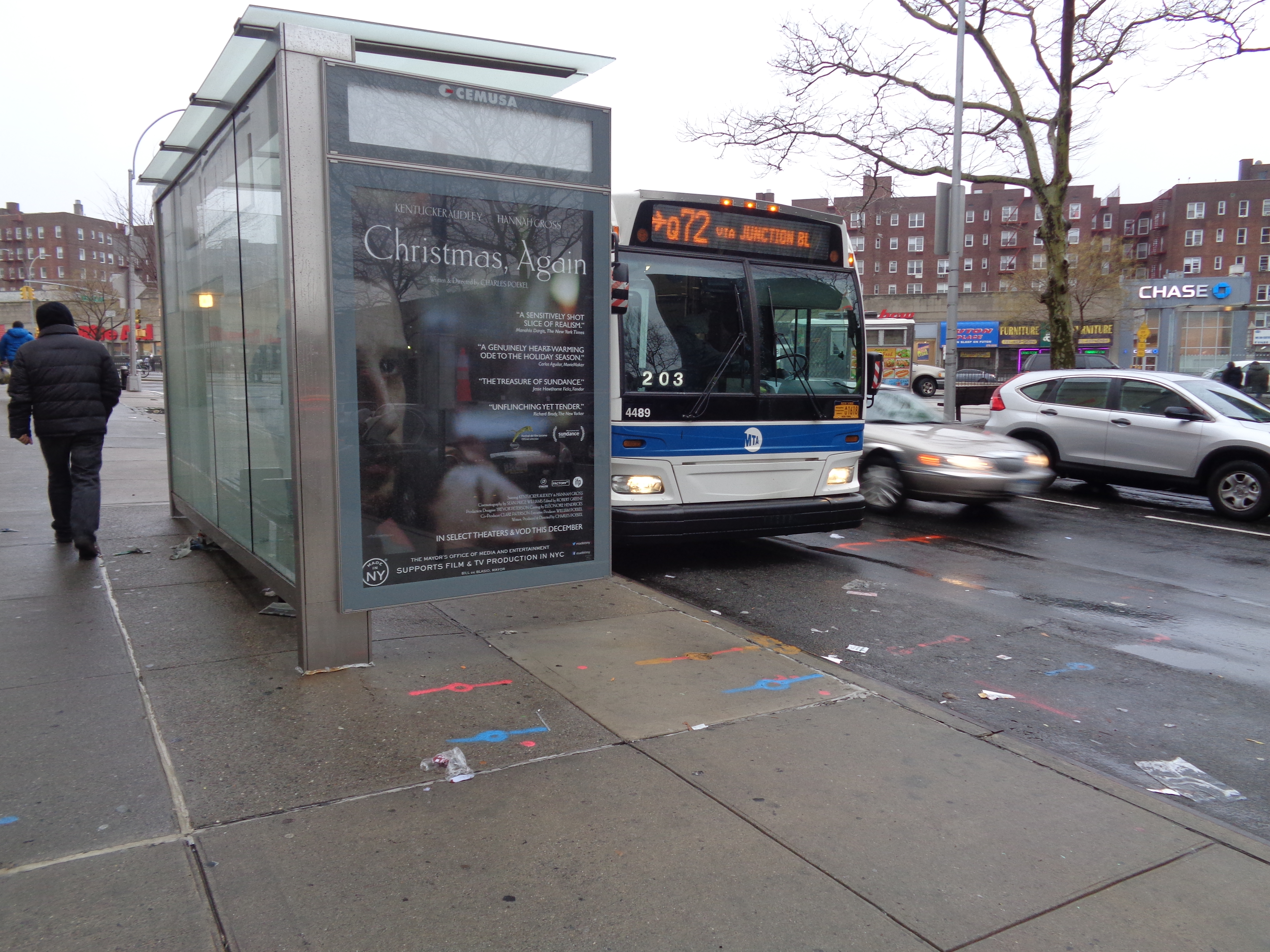
A 2009 Orion VII NG HEV (4489) on the LaGuardia-bound Q72 at Junction/Queens Boulevards (Rego Center)

Around this time, many streetcar lines in Queens and the rest of the city began to be replaced by buses, particularly after the unification of city's three primary transit companies (including the BMT) under municipal operations in June 1940. Under public operations, Junction Boulevard trolley service became a shuttle once again in February 1946. On August 25, 1949, the trolley line was replaced by buses, and relocated onto 94th Street north of 32nd Avenue. Although initially planned to be extended north to LaGuardia Airport and south to Queens Boulevard, the route continued to run only between Corona Avenue and Ditmars Boulevard/Grand Central Parkway. In spite of running entirely in Queens, the route was numbered "B72", "B" standing for Brooklyn; the Flushing–Ridgewood and Grand Street lines also received Brooklyn designations (B58 and B59). The B59 and B72 originally operated out of the now-closed Crosstown Depot in Greenpoint, Brooklyn. A second route, called the B72A, was proposed as an intra-airport shuttle between the LaGuardia Overseas Terminal Administration Building (now the Marine Air Terminal) at 85th Street and 102nd Street (near the current Terminal C). This route, which was not implemented, would have connected with the B72 at 94th Street and Ditmars Boulevard, and replaced the old Q48 between Flushing and the Airport.

In 1954 and again in July 1960, the Green Bus Lines, Triboro Coach, and Jamaica Buses companies (all owned by the shareholders of Green Lines) proposed to take over many city-operated bus lines in Queens and Brooklyn, including the Junction Boulevard route. At the same time as the 1960 proposal, the New York City Transit Authority applied for an extension of the Junction Boulevard route south from Corona Avenue to Queens Boulevard (its current terminus). That year, the B72 was moved to the Flushing Depot in Queens. On January 22, 1961, the B72 was transferred to Triboro Coach and renumbered Q72. It was extended south to Queens Boulevard to serve burgeoning apartments in Rego Park and Elmhurst, as well as the local Alexander's department store (now the Rego Center). It was also extended north to the LaGuardia Airport Administration building (Marine Air Terminal). The Q72 was the only city route to be taken over by a private operator. The switch to private operations eliminated the longtime free transfer to the B58 Flushing–Ridgewood service at Corona Avenue. By the 1970s, the Q72 bus was truncated back to Ditmars Boulevard and 94th Street.

=== MTA takeover ===
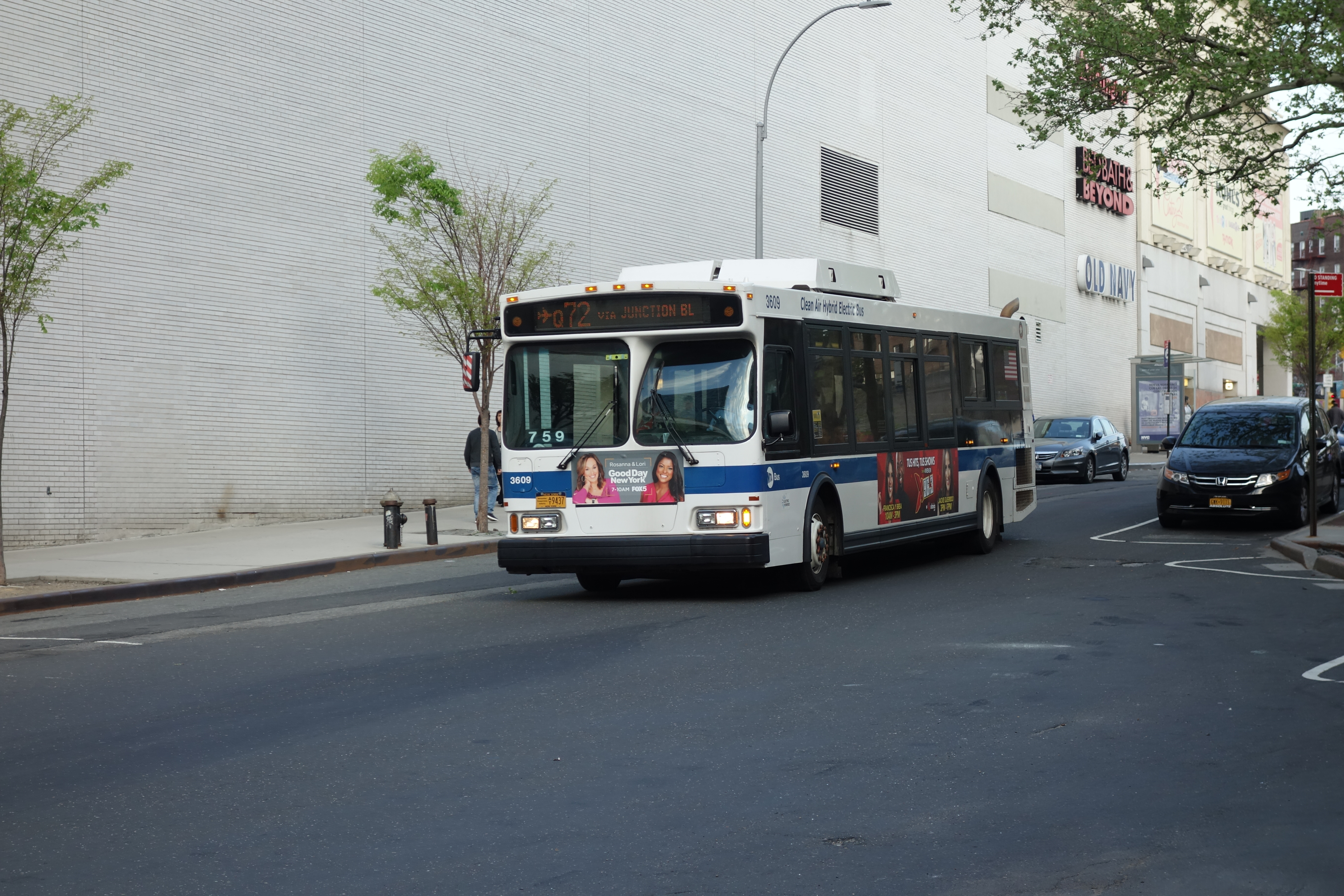
A 2007 Orion VII OG HEV (3609) on the LaGuardia Airport-bound Q72 at Queens Blvd/Junction Blvd in Rego Park

On February 2, 2006, the operations of Triboro Coach were taken over by the Metropolitan Transportation Authority (MTA) under the MTA Bus Company brand. In September of that year, the Q72 route was extended to LaGuardia Airport. On October 12, 2009, buses on the Q72 were equipped with luggage racks, as part of a ten-bus pilot program on airport bus services to improve passenger flow.

=== Bus redesigns ===
In December 2019, the MTA released a draft redesign of the Queens bus network. As part of the redesign, the Q72 bus would have terminated at Ditmars Boulevard and would have most of its stops eliminated. The redesign was delayed due to the COVID-19 pandemic in New York City in 2020, and the original draft plan was dropped due to negative feedback.

A revised plan was released in March 2022. As part of the new plan, the Q72 would have continued to serve LaGuardia Airport, with a slight modification to its southern terminus. The Q72 would have turned right onto 62nd Drive, Queens Boulevard, and 59th Avenue, serving Queens Center Mall and the Woodhaven Boulevard station. This change was proposed because the Woodhaven Boulevard station was planned to become wheelchair-accessible, whereas the 63rd Drive station was not.

A final bus-redesign plan was released in December 2023. The Q72's routing would not change, but some closely spaced stops would be eliminated, and service spans and frequencies would be modified, with extra rush hour trips added south of Ditmars Boulevard.

On December 17, 2024, amendments made to the final plan were released. Among these, stop changes were made on the Q72. On January 29, 2025, the current plan was approved by the MTA Board, and the Queens Bus Redesign went into effect in two different phases during Summer 2025. The Q72 is part of Phase II, which began on August 31, 2025.

== Connecting bus routes ==
- Q70 SBS, Q90, M60 SBS (at LaGuardia Airport)
- Q47 (at 23rd Avenue)
- Q19, Q49 (at Astoria Boulevard)
- Q63, Q66 (at Northern Boulevard)
- Q58 (at Corona Avenue)
- Q14 (at 57th Avenue)
- Q88 (at 59th Avenue)
- Q38 (at 62nd Drive)
- Q59, Q60 (at Queens Boulevard)

== See also ==
- Triboro Coach Corporation
