= M60 (New York City bus) =

Bus route in Manhattan and Queens, New York

m60
- 125th Street−LaGuardia Airport Line
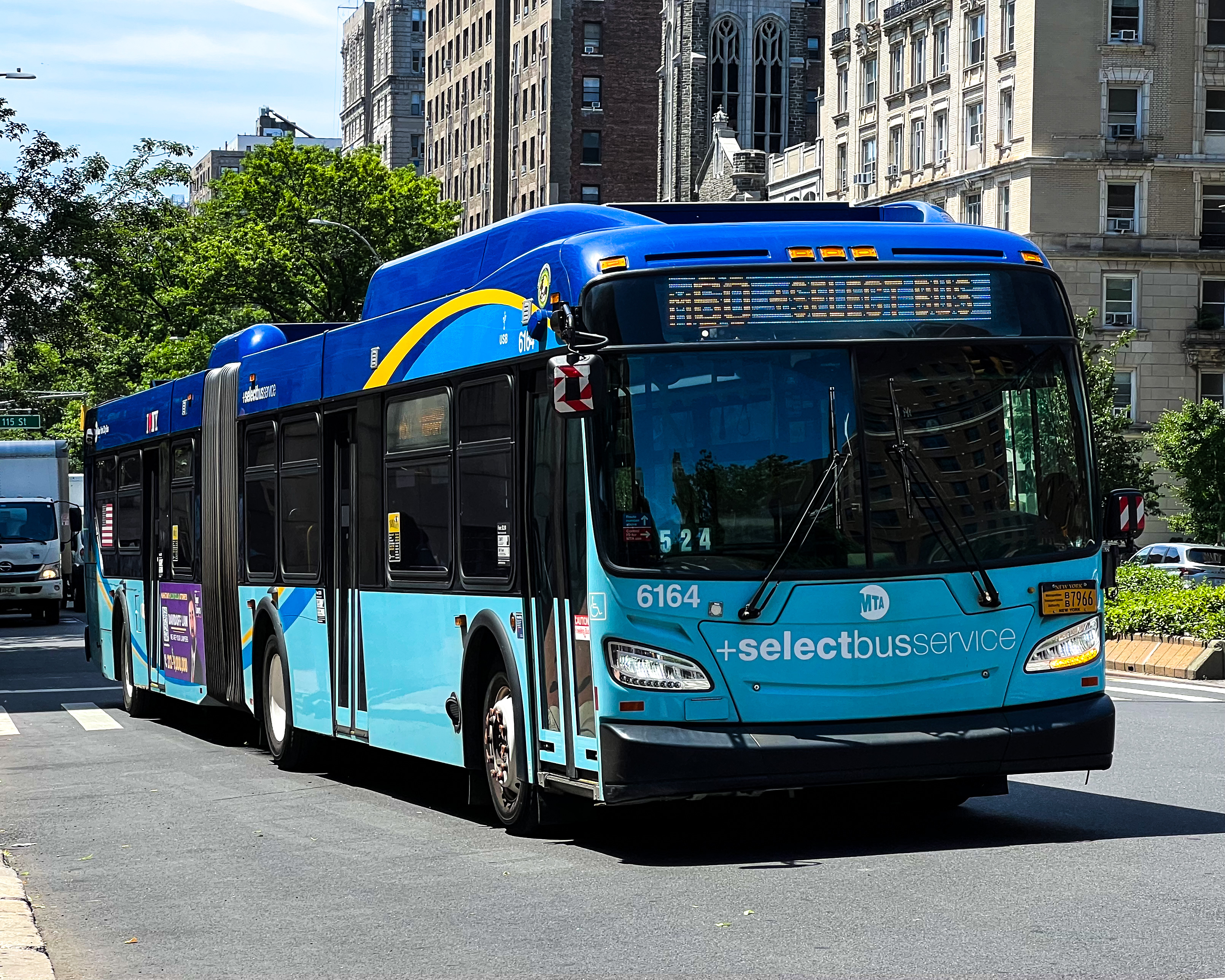
- A 2019 XD60 (6164) on the M60 SBS in 2024

Overview
- System: MTA Regional Bus Operations
- Operator: Manhattan and Bronx Surface Transit Operating Authority
- Garage: Michael J. Quill Depot
- Vehicle: Nova Bus LFS articulated (main vehicle); New Flyer Xcelsior XD60; New Flyer Xcelsior XE60; New Flyer Xcelsior XD40; New Flyer Xcelsior XE40; Nova Bus LFS HEV (supplemental service)
- Began service: September 13, 1992; May 25, 2014 (Select Bus Service)

Route
- Locale: Manhattan and Queens, New York, U.S.
- Start: Upper West Side – Broadway / 106th Street
- Via: 125th Street, Triborough Bridge, Astoria Boulevard
- End: LaGuardia Airport
- Length: 9.4 miles (15.1 km)
- Stations: 21
- Other routes: M125 The Hub/125th Street; M100 Broadway/Amsterdam Avenue; M101 3rd/Lexington/Amsterdam Avs/125th Street

Service
- Operates: 24 hours
- Annual patronage: 2,434,681 (2025)
- Transfers: Yes
- Timetable: M60 SBS

The M60 Select Bus Service is a bus route in New York City. It is part of MTA Regional Bus Operations, operated by the Manhattan and Bronx Surface Transit Operating Authority (MaBSTOA) under the New York City Transit brand. The M60 provides service between the Upper West Side of Manhattan and LaGuardia Airport in East Elmhurst, Queens, traveling between boroughs via the RFK-Triborough Bridge. It is the only direct public transit option between Manhattan and LaGuardia Airport, as well as the only bus route to serve all LGA terminals.

The M60 was introduced in 1992 as an airport connector and is usually advertised as such. Much of the M60's passenger load, however, is from its crosstown service along 125th Street in Harlem; the M60 is the busiest along 125th Street of the four bus routes that run along the 125th Street Crosstown Line ("125th Street corridor"). On May 25, 2014, the M60 was converted into a Select Bus Service (SBS) route to improve service to-and-from the airport, and service along 125th Street.

== Route description and service ==
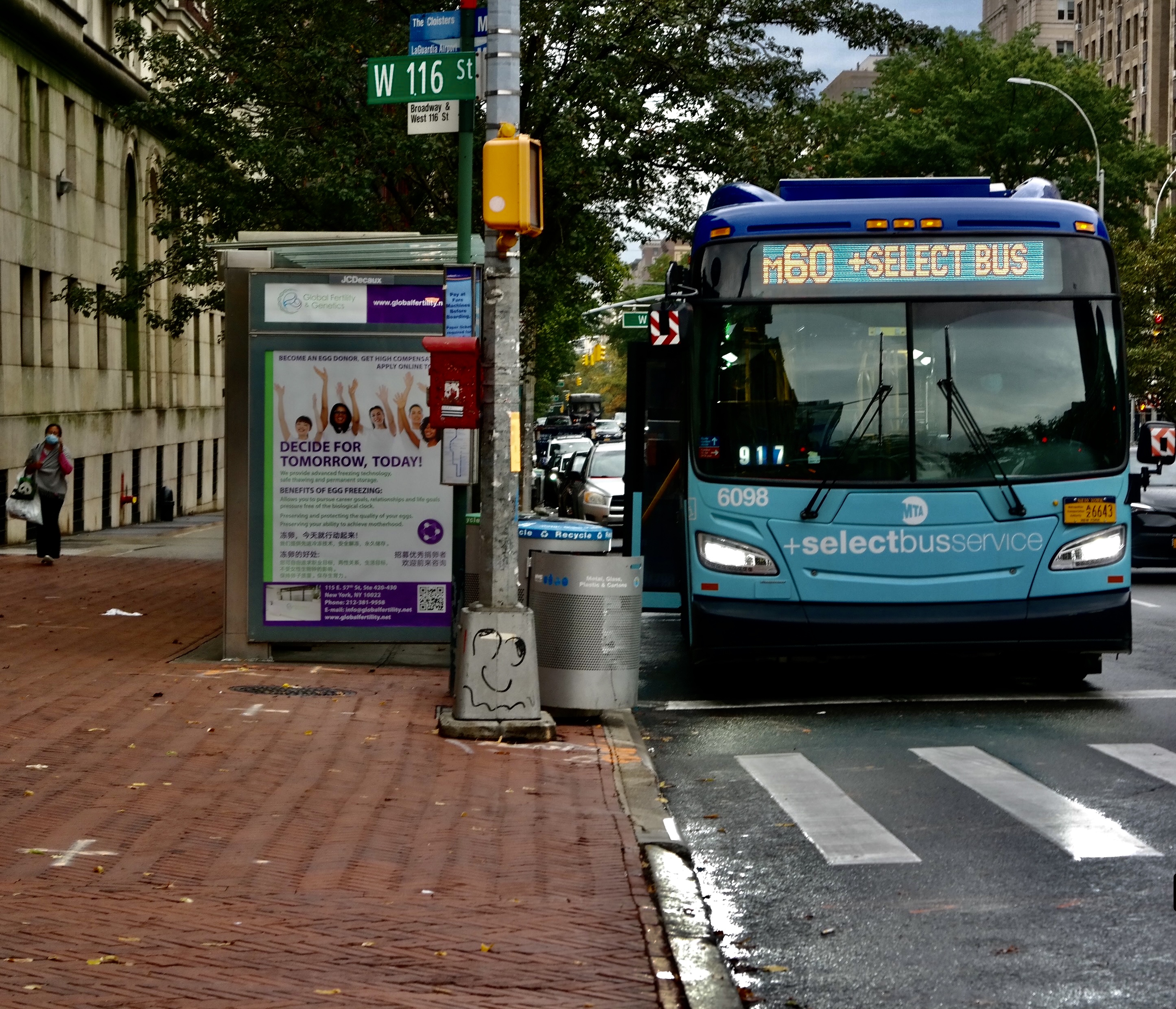
A 2017 XD60 (6098) on the LaGuardia-bound M60 SBS at Broadway/West 116th Street

The M60 begins on the Upper West Side in Manhattan at West 106th Street and Broadway. It turns east at 120th Street, and north at Amsterdam Avenue, before turning east onto 125th Street in Manhattanville. Along 125th Street in Harlem, the M60 provides limited-stop service, with the M100, M101 and M125 providing local service. At the east end of the street, it enters the Triborough Bridge, crossing into Queens. It then travels along Astoria Boulevard (the service road for the Grand Central Parkway) and 23rd Avenue to 94th Street, providing limited-stop service in the neighborhoods of Astoria and East Elmhurst. The Q19 provides local service along Astoria Boulevard, and the Q47 along 23rd Avenue. At 94th Street, the M60 turns north and enters the airport, serving Terminals B, C, and A (in that order) before returning to Manhattan.

The M60 connects with several subway lines in Manhattan–the IRT West Side Line, IND Eighth Avenue Line, IRT Lenox Avenue Line, and IRT Lexington Avenue Line–as well as the Harlem–125th Street station of the Metro-North Railroad. It also connects with the BMT Astoria Line (leading to the BMT Broadway Line) in Astoria.

=== Stops ===
Station Street traveled	Direction	Connections
Manhattan
West 106th Street Broadway	Eastbound station, westbound terminal	NYC Bus: M104, M116
West 116th Street Columbia University	Bidirectional	NYC Bus: M4, M104; NYC Subway: train at 116th Street–Columbia University
West 120th Street / Broadway	Bidirectional	NYC Bus: M4, M104
West 120th Street / Amsterdam Avenue	Bidirectional	NYC Bus: M11
LaSalle Street / Amsterdam Avenue 125th Street	Bidirectional	NYC Bus: M11, M100, M101, M104, M125
St. Nicholas Avenue / Douglass Boulevard 125th Street	Bidirectional	NYC Bus: M3, M10, M100, M101, M125; NYC Subway: trains at 125th Street
Lenox Avenue 125th Street	Bidirectional	NYC Bus: M1 (southbound only at Fifth Avenue), M7, M101, M102, M125; NYC Subway: trains at 125th Street
Madison Avenue / Park Avenue 125th Street	Bidirectional	NYC Bus: M1 (northbound only; southbound at Fifth Avenue), M98 (southbound only), M101, M125; Metro-North at Harlem–125th Street
Lexington Avenue 125th Street	Bidirectional	NYC Bus: M35, M98 (northbound only at Third Avenue), M101, M103, M125; NYC Subway: trains at 125th Street; Metro-North at Harlem–125th Street
Second Avenue 125th Street	Bidirectional	NYC Bus: M15, M15 SBS, M125
Triborough Bridge
Queens
31st Street Hoyt Avenue	Bidirectional	MTA Bus: Q19; NYC Subway: trains at Astoria Boulevard
Steinway Street Astoria Boulevard	Bidirectional	MTA Bus: Q19, Q101
77th Street Astoria Boulevard	Bidirectional	MTA Bus: Q19
82nd Street 23rd Avenue	Eastbound	MTA Bus: Q33, Q47
Ditmars Boulevard / 82nd Street § Grand Central Parkway Service Road North	Westbound	MTA Bus: Q47, Q69
87th Street 23rd Avenue	Eastbound	MTA Bus: Q47
94th Street 23rd Avenue	Eastbound	MTA Bus: Q47, Q72
Terminal B	Airport stop	MTA Bus: Q70 SBS, Q72; NYC Bus: Q90; LGA Shuttle Bus
Terminal C	Airport stop	MTA Bus: Q70 SBS, Q72; NYC Bus: Q90; LGA Shuttle Bus
Terminal A Marine Air Terminal	Airport stop	MTA Bus: Q33; LGA Shuttle Bus
Notes: 1. The route loops around LaGuardia Airport terminal bus stops and continues operating back toward the westbound terminus. There is no eastbound terminus stand.; 2. Passengers traveling eastbound toward LaGuardia Airport must be off the bus by the Terminal A (Marine Air Terminal) stop, or purchase a westbound fare at fare payment machines at LaGuardia Airport stops.; 3. Bus stops marked with an (§) are not served between midnight and 6 AM, when the 82nd Street exit (and the airport in general) is closed.

== History ==
=== Local bus route ===
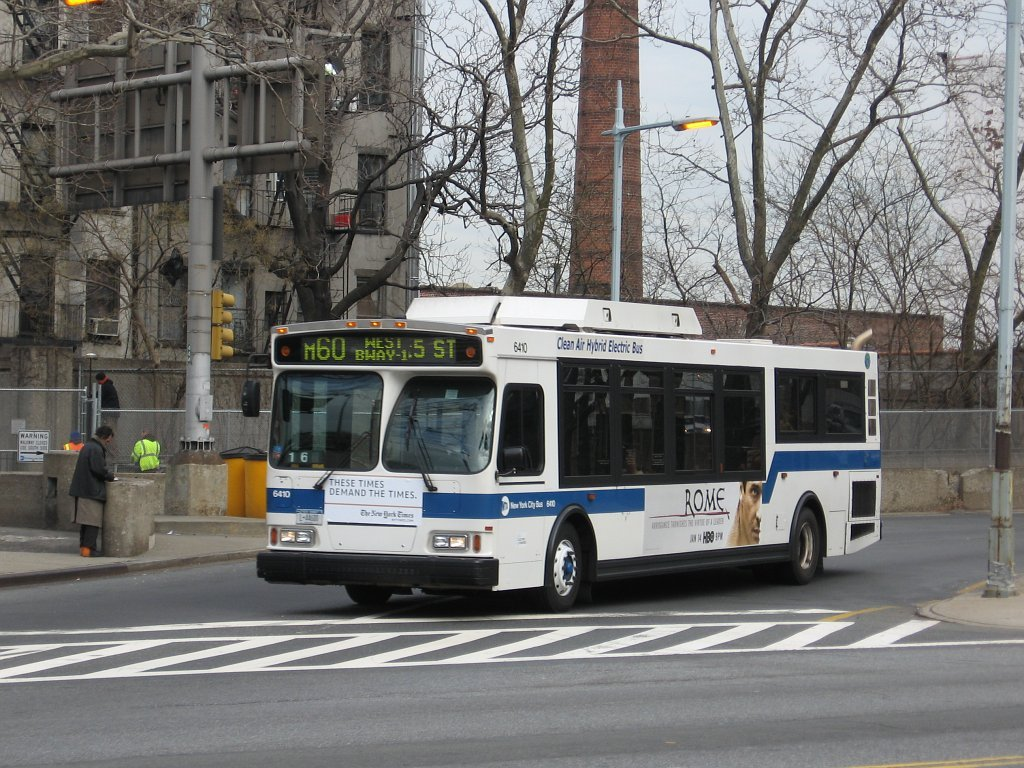
A 2004 Orion VII OG HEV (6410) on the West Side-bound M60 in 2007, prior to articulated and SBS implementations.

In 1991, the Metropolitan Transportation Authority (MTA) held a public hearing to discuss a bus route between Manhattan and LaGuardia Airport. It was first proposed as the Q49 from LaGuardia Airport to Park Avenue and East 125th Street, at Harlem–125th Street station on the Metro-North Railroad, but was quickly renamed the M60. The M60 was approved for implementation in mid-1992 and began service on September 13, 1992, running between Adam Clayton Powell Jr. Boulevard (Seventh Avenue) and the airport. On May 1, 1994, it was extended to Columbia University and the 116th Street subway station. The M60 was extended west along 125th Street, south on Amsterdam Avenue west on 120th Street, south on Claremont Avenue to West 116th Street, and then north on Broadway to the terminal. The route was extended in response to requests from residents and groups from Morningside Heights and West Harlem. 20% of M60 riders surveyed said that they had used taxis, car services, personal cars or Carey Bus before its introduction and 25% said that they walked or did not make the trip. These 45% of riders surveyed were new NYC Transit riders.

In June 1995, the route was extended 0.4 miles (0.64 km) to West 106th Street and Broadway, and was rerouted to Broadway from Claremont Avenue as residents on that street believed that the route had decreased their quality of life. Three options had been considered to reroute or extend the M60: using Riverside Drive, extending the route to West 110th Street, and extending the route to West 106th Street, which was decided upon. The M60 was extended south via Broadway and West End Avenue to West 106th Street, making limited stops, and laying over at West 106th Street and Broadway. The extension provided direct service between the Upper West Side and LaGuardia.

Between 1997 and 2004, the bus route had an increase in ridership of 237%, leading to a decrease in trip headways from 20 minutes to 15 minutes in 1998, and under 10 minutes by the 2000s. On October 12, 2009, the first luggage rack-equipped bus in the city debuted on the M60, as part of a ten-bus pilot program on airport bus services to improve passenger flow. In August 2011, two 60-foot (18 m) articulated buses started running per day on the M60, before permanent conversion to replace the 40-foot (12 m) buses on the route by September 2012.

=== Select Bus Service route ===
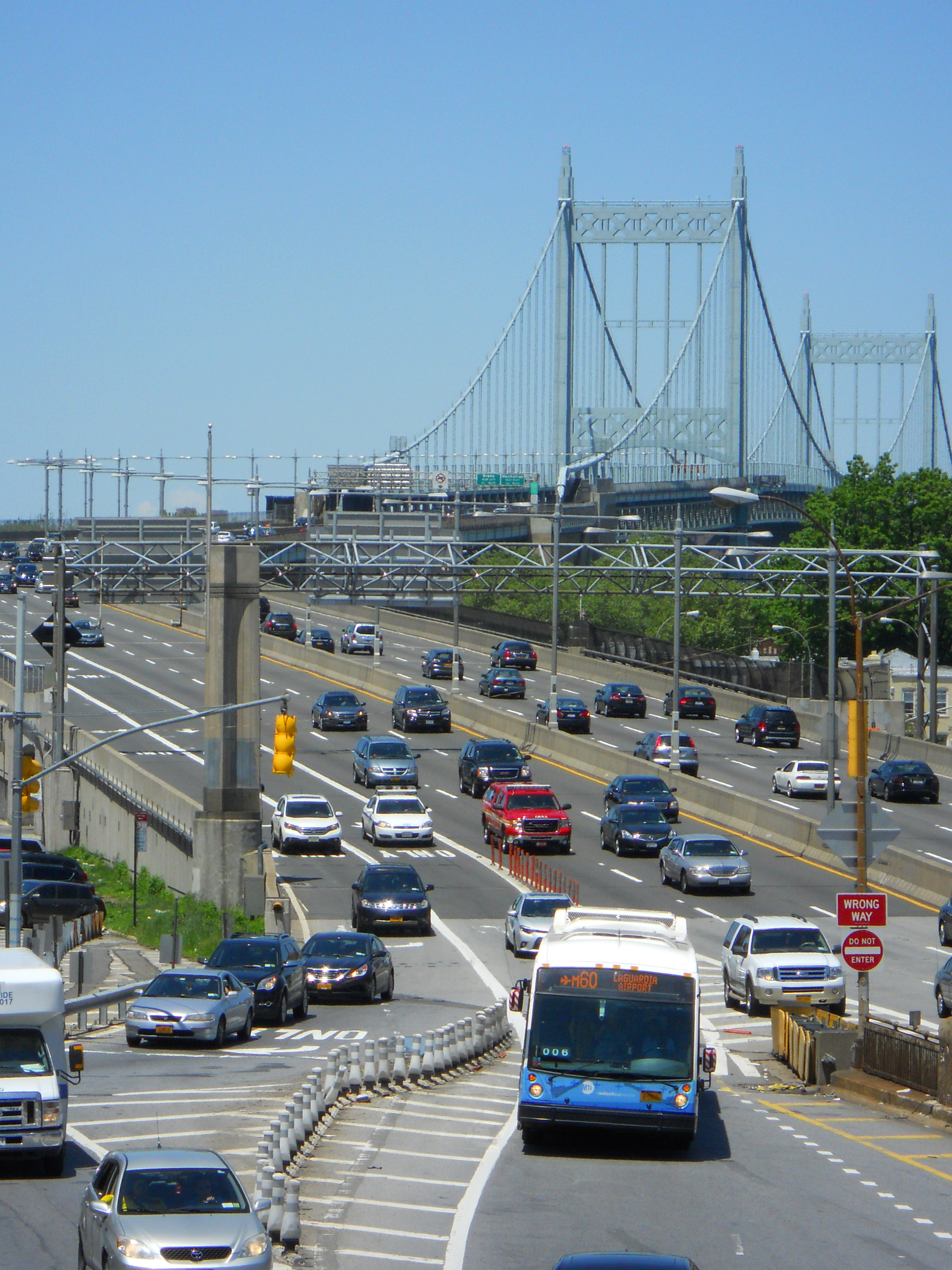
A Nova Bus LFS Articulated on the LaGuardia-bound M60 SBS exiting Interstate 278 in Queens after crossing the Triborough Bridge.

In 2009, the MTA and the New York City Department of Transportation (NYCDOT) identified the M60 as a potential corridor for Phase II of Select Bus Service (SBS), the city's bus rapid transit service. The M60 was identified under studies to improve crosstown service on 125th Street, which like other crosstown bus corridors was noted for slow travel speeds. It was also identified as a corridor for improvement by the LaGuardia Airport Access Alternatives Analysis, which conducted with the Port Authority of New York and New Jersey to improve bus service to LaGuardia Airport. The reason for the creation of the LaGuardia Access Alternatives study was the slow bus service on the M60, Q33, Q47, Q48, and Q72, which all went to LaGuardia Airport. A separate outside study in 2011 by the Regional Plan Association proposed creating dedicated busways along the Grand Central Parkway to speed up M60 service.

The M60 is one of three SBS routes that were planned under the LaGuardia Alternatives Analysis. The Q70 Limited became an SBS route on September 25, 2016, and the Bx41 SBS route had been planned to be extended to LaGuardia Airport under the LaGuardia Alternatives Analysis. However, the Bx41 extension has not been implemented yet due to a lack of funding. According to the city government, the three routes" would provide "shorter term, lower cost transit improvements" for LaGuardia Airport. At the time, the airport was the New York area's only large airport without any rapid transit connections to Manhattan.

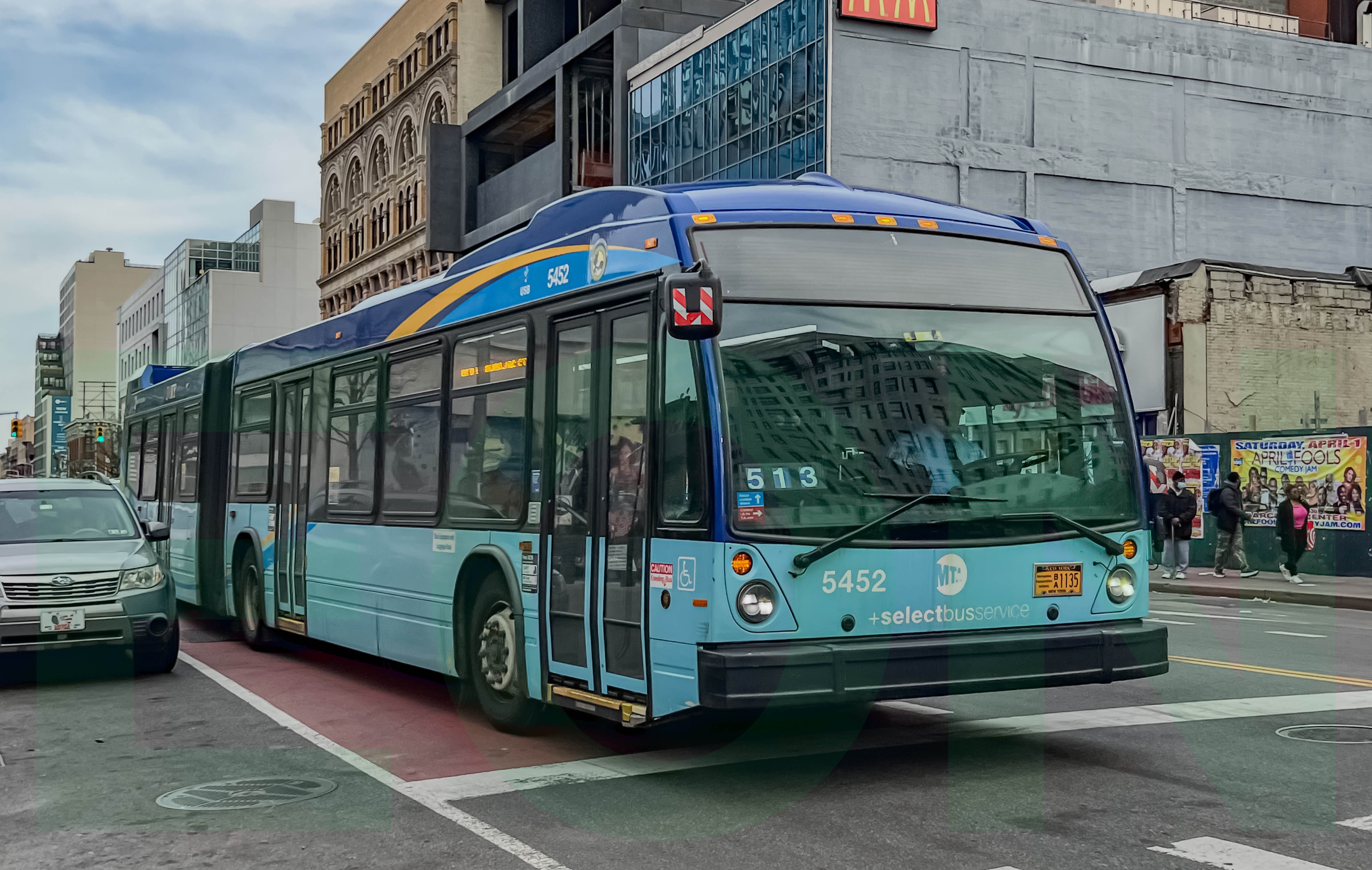
A 2017 Nova Bus LFS Articulated (5452) on the Upper West Side-bound M60 SBS in April 2023.

Studies and community outreach for Select Bus Service upgrades were conducted through 2011, and plans to implement the M60 SBS were announced on October 11, 2012. At the time, the M60 was the heaviest used of the four 125th Street crosstown buses. The plan would turn the M60 local into a limited-stop service along 125th Street, with the number of stops along the corridor reduced from eleven to six. It would add dedicated MTA bus lanes and other improvements to speed travel times, and make the fleet entirely articulated and fully equipped with luggage racks. Plans for the SBS route were scrapped in July 2013 after opposition from the Harlem community and state senator Bill Perkins, over the potential loss of parking space on 125th Street, and due to a lack of collaboration by the DOT with the community.

In October 2013, the plan was reinstated after the proposed bus lanes along 125th Street between Morningside Avenue on the West Side and Lenox Avenue in central Harlem were eliminated. The M60 SBS began service on May 25, 2014. An inauguration ceremony was held two days later.In January 2023, the MTA released a strategic action plan called "Extending Transit's Reach". As part of this plan, the M60 SBS fleet was scheduled to receive bike racks. The bike racks had been installed on the fronts of the buses by 2024.

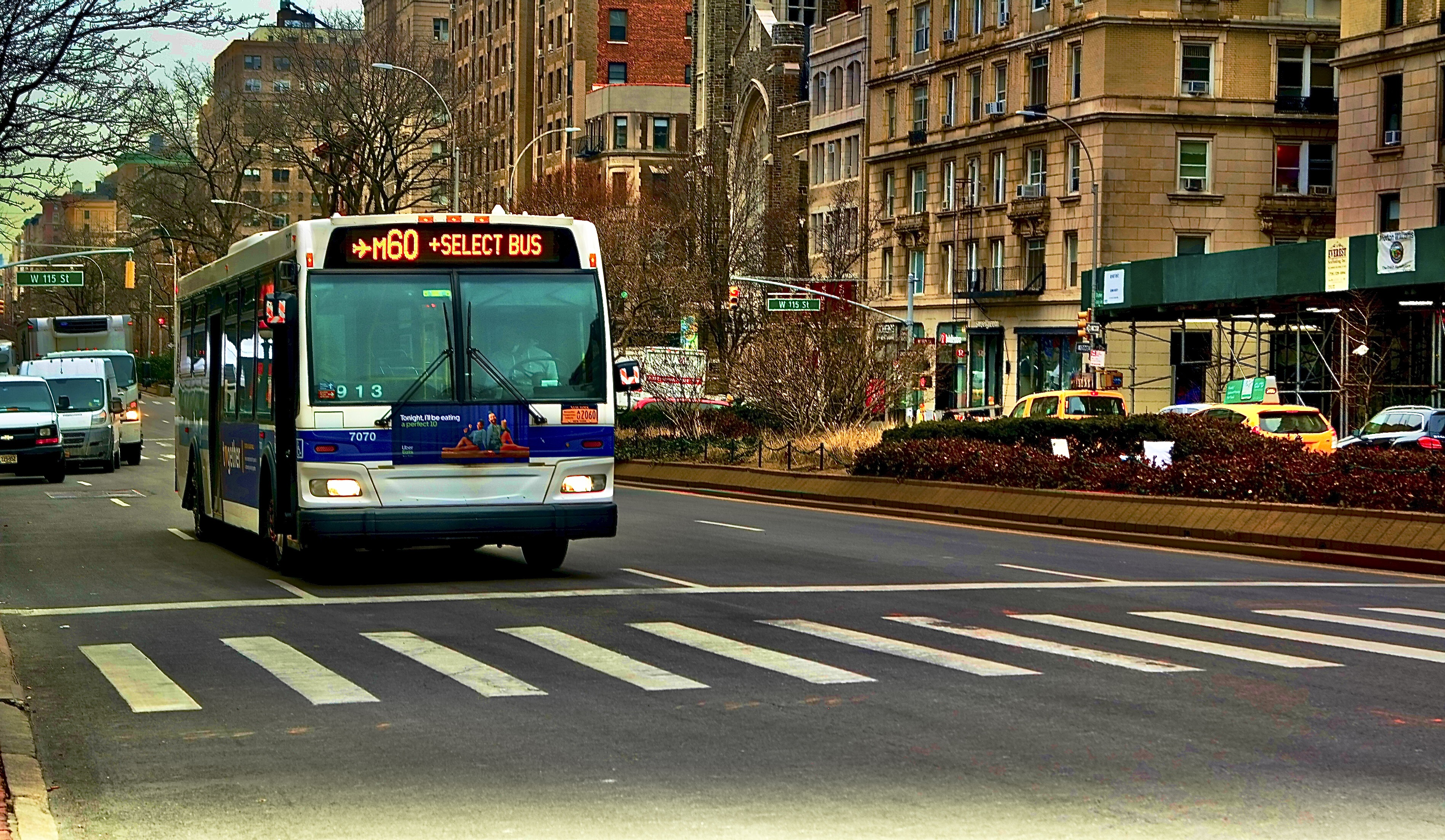
A 2011 Orion VII EPA10 (7070), used as a loan on the LaGuardia Airport-bound M60 SBS at Broadway/West 116th Street (Columbia University)
