= Saleh Z. Habal =

Syrian diplomat (born 1919)

- Born: Saleh Zahed Habal; February 1, 1919; Damascus, Syria
- Education: Pennsylvania State University
- Occupation: diplomat
- Known for: diplomat for 40 years at the United Nations for missions in Africa

Saleh Zahed Habal (born 1 February 1919) is a Syrian diplomat.

== Life and career ==
Habal was born on 1 February 1919 in Damascus, Syria from a Pasha father. He studied history in the United States of America. He passed his thesis in 1949 at Pennsylvania State University.

He served as a diplomat for 40 years at the United Nations for missions in Africa. He was the Director of Documentation in the Embassy of the United Nations in Khartoum. He was one of the first Syrians to serve as a diplomat at the United Nations. His missions were in Rwanda, Congo, and Sudan.

Habal moved to Rego Park, Queens in 1967, six years after the birth of his first son. He then worked at the United Nations in New York and continued his humanitarian efforts.

== Publications ==
- Habal, Saleh Zahed (1949). A Study on Arabic Patriotism. Translated by Ila-l-awtan, Kitab Al-hanin. Al-Jahiz University Microfilms.
