= Rego Park =

Neighborhood in New York City

- Neighborhood of Queens
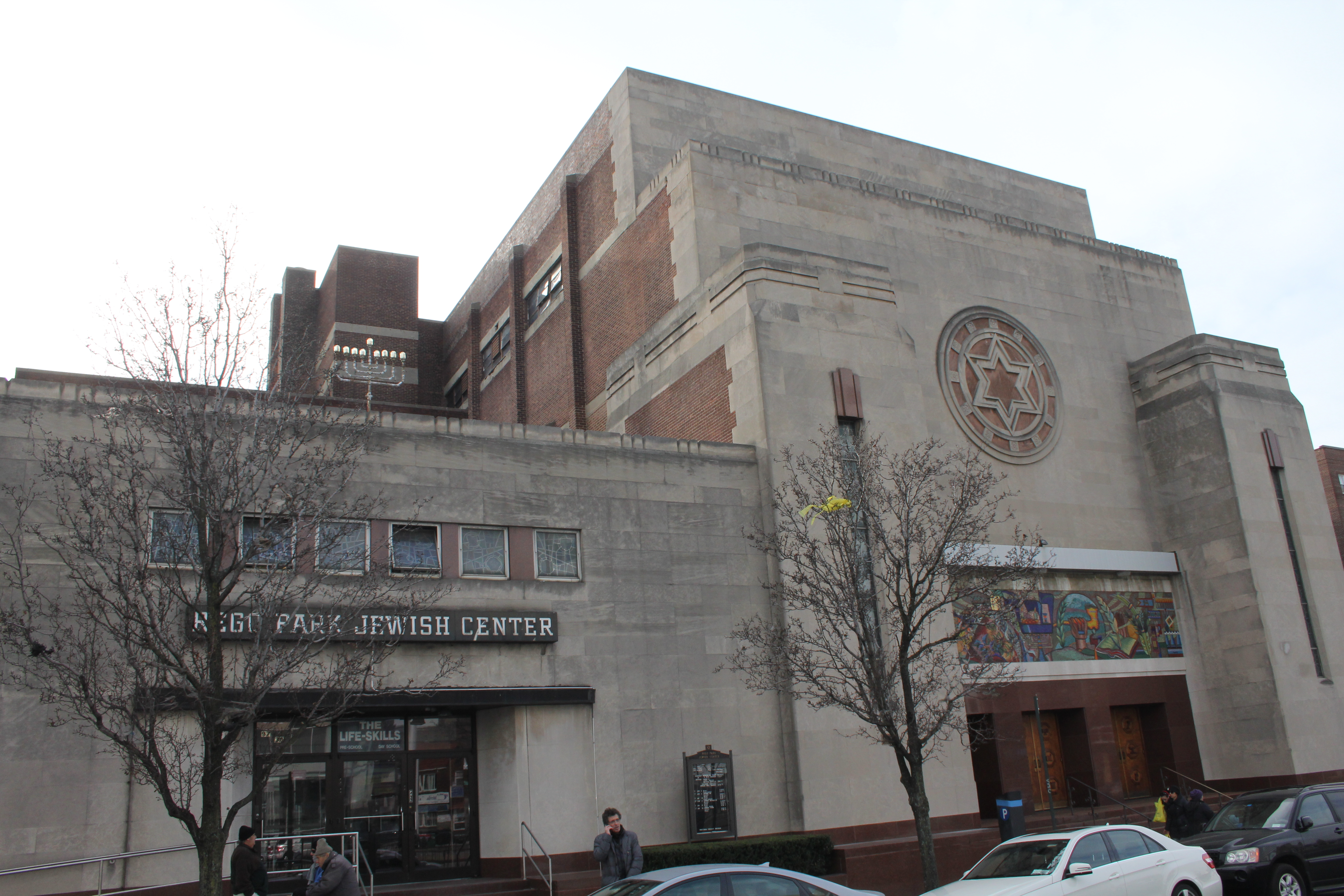
- Rego Park Jewish Center
- Nicknames: Bukharlem/Buharlem, Real Good Park
- Location within New York City
- Coordinates: 40°43′30″N 73°51′36″W
- Country: United States
- State: New York
- City: New York City
- County/Borough: Queens
- Community District: Queens 6
- Settled: 1653
- Developed: 1920s
- Founder: English and Dutch settlers
- Named for: The Real Good Construction Company

Area
  - Total: 1.95 sq mi (5.04 km^{2})
- Elevation: 91 ft (27.8 m)

Population (2010)
  - Total: 28,260

Ethnicity
  - White: 46.2%
  - Asian: 31.7%
  - Hispanic: 16.6%
  - Other/Multiracial: 3.0%
  - Black: 2.5%
- Time zone: UTC−5 (EST)
  - Summer (DST): UTC−4 (EDT)
- ZIP Code: 11374
- Area codes: 718, 347, 929, and 917

Rego Park is a neighborhood in the borough of Queens in New York City. Rego Park is bordered to the north by Elmhurst and Corona, to the east and south by Forest Hills, and to the west by Middle Village. Rego Park's boundaries include Queens Boulevard, the Long Island Expressway, Woodhaven Boulevard, and Yellowstone Boulevard. There is a large Jewish population in the neighborhood, which features high-rise apartment buildings and detached houses, as well as a large commercial zone.

Rego Park is located in Queens Community District 6 and its ZIP Code is 11374. It is patrolled by the New York City Police Department's 112th Precinct. Politically, Rego Park is represented by the New York City Council's 29th District and a small part of the 24th and 25th Districts.

== History ==
Rego Park is built on lands originally part of the Lenape Nation, possibly inhabited by members of the Canarsee band. By 1653, though, English and Dutch farmers moved into the area and founded a community called Whitepot, which was a part of the Township of Newtown. Whitepot is believed to be so named because Dutch settlers named the area "Whiteput", or "hollow creek"; later, English settlers Anglicized the name. The Remsen family created a burial ground, which is still located on Alderton Street near Metropolitan Avenue. The colonists also founded the Whitepot School, which operated until the late 19th century.

The area turned out to be good for farming; the colonists cultivated hay, straw, rye, corn, oats, and vegetables. The original Dutch, English, and German farmers sold their produce in Manhattan; by the end of the 19th century, though, Chinese farmers moved in and sold their goods exclusively to Chinatown.

The settlement was renamed Rego Park after the Real Good Construction Company, which began development of the area in 1925. "Rego" comes from the first two letters of the first two words of the company's name. The company built 525 eight-room houses costing $8,000 each. Stores were built in 1926 on Queens Boulevard and 63rd Drive, and apartment buildings were built in 1927–1928. In 1930, the Independent Subway System began work on eight IND Queens Boulevard Line stations in the area, at a cost of $5 million. The subway extension was concurrent with the Real Good Construction Company's completion of apartment buildings near Queens Boulevard and one-family homes throughout the rest of the neighborhood.

The short block of 63rd Drive between Austin Street and the Long Island Rail Road overpass was the scene of a fire in February 1972 that claimed a row of stores and the neighborhood library. The blistering "Rego Park Inferno" reportedly started in the second store on the block from Austin Street, a shoe store, and quickly spread with the gusting winds to neighboring stores, including a television repair shop, toy store, pet shop and a pioneering Indian restaurant, and finally, the library, where row upon row of oily books and wooden shelves sent flames high into the sky and up the embankment of the railroad. Firefighters scrambled to keep the windswept flames from reaching an apartment house behind the stores, a new Key Food supermarket across Austin Street, or the Shell gas station just across the drive. The library caved in before flames could damage the electrical wires lining the railroad. A new library eventually opened across the street (on the former site of the Shell gas station). After the fire, until the new library was built, the community was served by a mobile "Bookmobile" library which parked under the LIRR tracks on 63rd Drive. A similar fire had devastated the same block in 1959.

== Demographics ==
Based on data from the 2010 United States census, the population of Rego Park was 28,260, a decrease of 1,144 (3.9%) from the 29,404 counted in 2000. Covering an area of 455.74 acres (184.43 ha), the neighborhood had a population density of 62.0 inhabitants per acre (39,700/sq mi; 15,300/km^{2}).

The racial makeup of the neighborhood was 46.2% (13,068) White, 2.5% (698) African American, 0.1% (41) Native American, 31.7% (8,966) Asian, 0.1% (7) Pacific Islander, 0.4% (124) from other races, and 2.4% (674) from two or more races. Hispanic or Latino of any race were 16.6% (4,682) of the population.

The entirety of Community Board 6, which comprises Rego Park and Forest Hills, had 115,119 inhabitants as of NYC Health's 2018 Community Health Profile, with an average life expectancy of 85.4 years. This is higher than the median life expectancy of 81.2 for all New York City neighborhoods. The plurality of inhabitants are middle-aged and elderly adults: 31% are between the ages of 25 and 44, 28% between 45 and 64, and 19% over 64. The ratio of young and college-aged residents was lower, at 16% and 5% respectively.

As of 2017, the median household income in Community Board 4 was $75,447. In 2018, an estimated 16% of Rego Park and Forest Hills residents lived in poverty, compared to 19% in all of Queens and 20% in all of New York City. One in seventeen residents (6%) were unemployed, compared to 8% in Queens and 9% in New York City. Rent burden, or the percentage of residents who have difficulty paying their rent, is 50% in Rego Park and Forest Hills, lower than the boroughwide and citywide rates of 53% and 51% respectively. Based on this calculation, as of 2018, Rego Park and Forest Hills is considered to be high-income relative to the rest of the city and not gentrifying.

=== Ethnic enclaves ===
Like its neighbor Forest Hills, Rego Park has long had a significant Jewish population, many of whom have Georgian and Russian Jewish ancestors, and consequently there are a number of synagogues and kosher restaurants. Many Holocaust survivors settled in Rego Park after 1945. In the 1990s, Jewish immigrants from the former Soviet Union, especially from Central Asia, moved in. Most of the residents are Bukharan Jewish, and the effect of life in the Soviet Union on the population has led Rego Park to have a Russian feel, with many signs in Russian Cyrillic. Most of the Bukharan Jewish immigrants in the neighborhood come from Uzbekistan and Tajikistan, and there is also Uzbek and Tajik cuisine in many Rego Park restaurants.

Immigrant populations from Albania, Bosnia, Bulgaria, Colombia, China, Iran, Israel, Italy, Mongolia, Peru, Romania, South Asia, South Korea, and Ukraine are also represented in the neighborhood, as well as many restaurants and stores operated by people of different nationalities. In the 2000s and 2010s, many young professionals also moved in, increasing the average price of residential units.

== Land use ==
=== Housing ===
Many apartment buildings, multi-family, and railroad houses make up the north side of Rego Park. Apartment complexes include The Carol House, Savoy Gardens, Jupiter Court, The Brussels, and Walden Terrace.

However, many houses in southern Rego Park are in the colonial, English, and Tudor styles with slate roofs. There are also two and multi-family townhouses, detached wood-frame houses. This is especially so in an area called the Crescents, named for its semicircular shaped streets emanating in a concentric pattern from Alderton Street, between Woodhaven Boulevard and the Long Island Rail Road's Main Line. The Crescents contain many Tudor and single-family homes, as well as large lawns and tree plantings on the sidewalks. There are also many newer "Fedders houses", so called because these newer houses are all cheaply made and uniform-looking, with the names of the air conditioners (usually of the Fedders brand) sticking out of the walls.

Vornado Realty Trust built a 312-unit residential tower on top of Rego Center Phase II, to accommodate a surge in young professionals moving into the area. About 20% of the units are studio apartments, with the rest being one- and two-bedroom apartments. In addition, other new residential projects are also under construction around the neighborhood.

=== Commerce ===
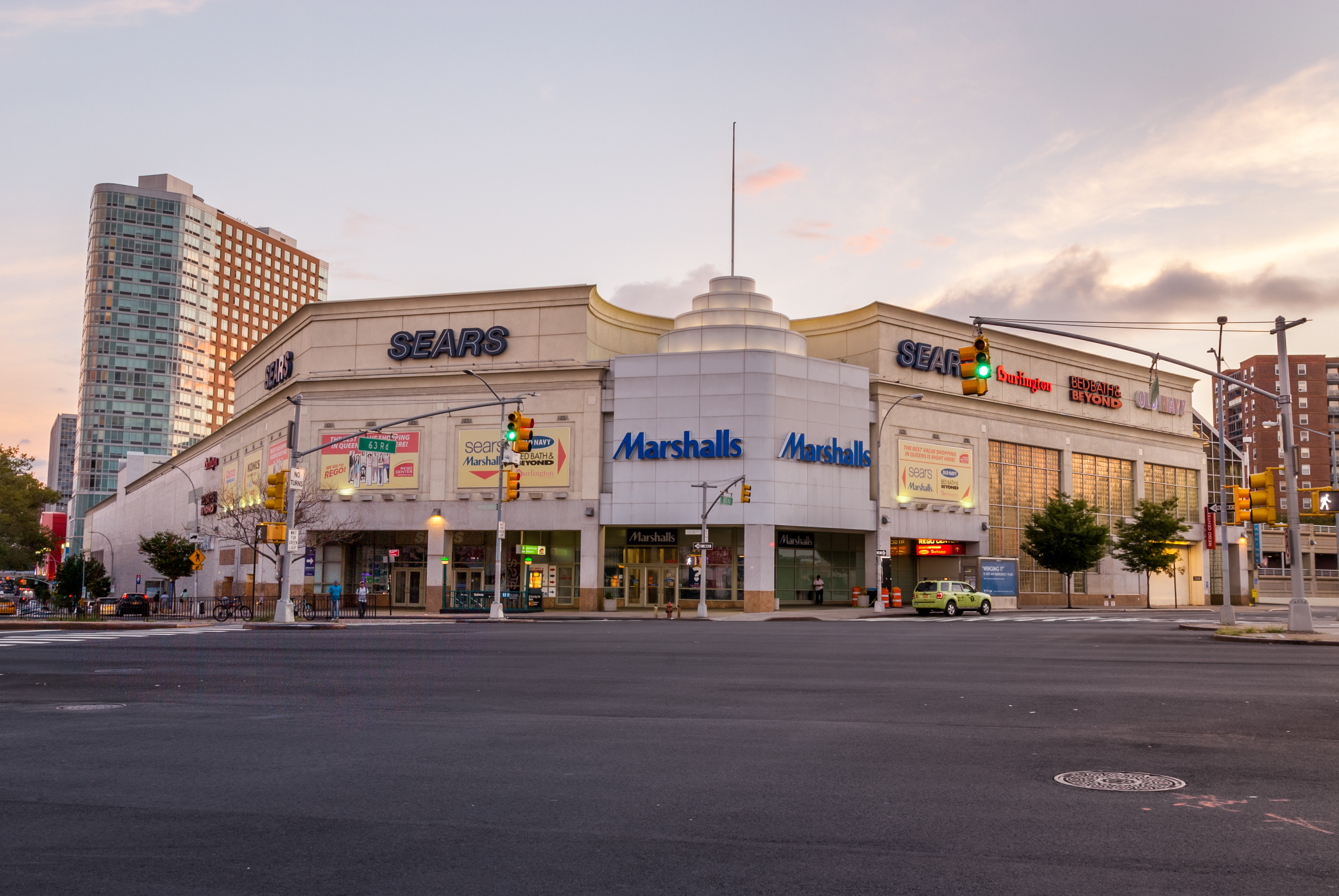
Rego Center Phase I (August 2016)

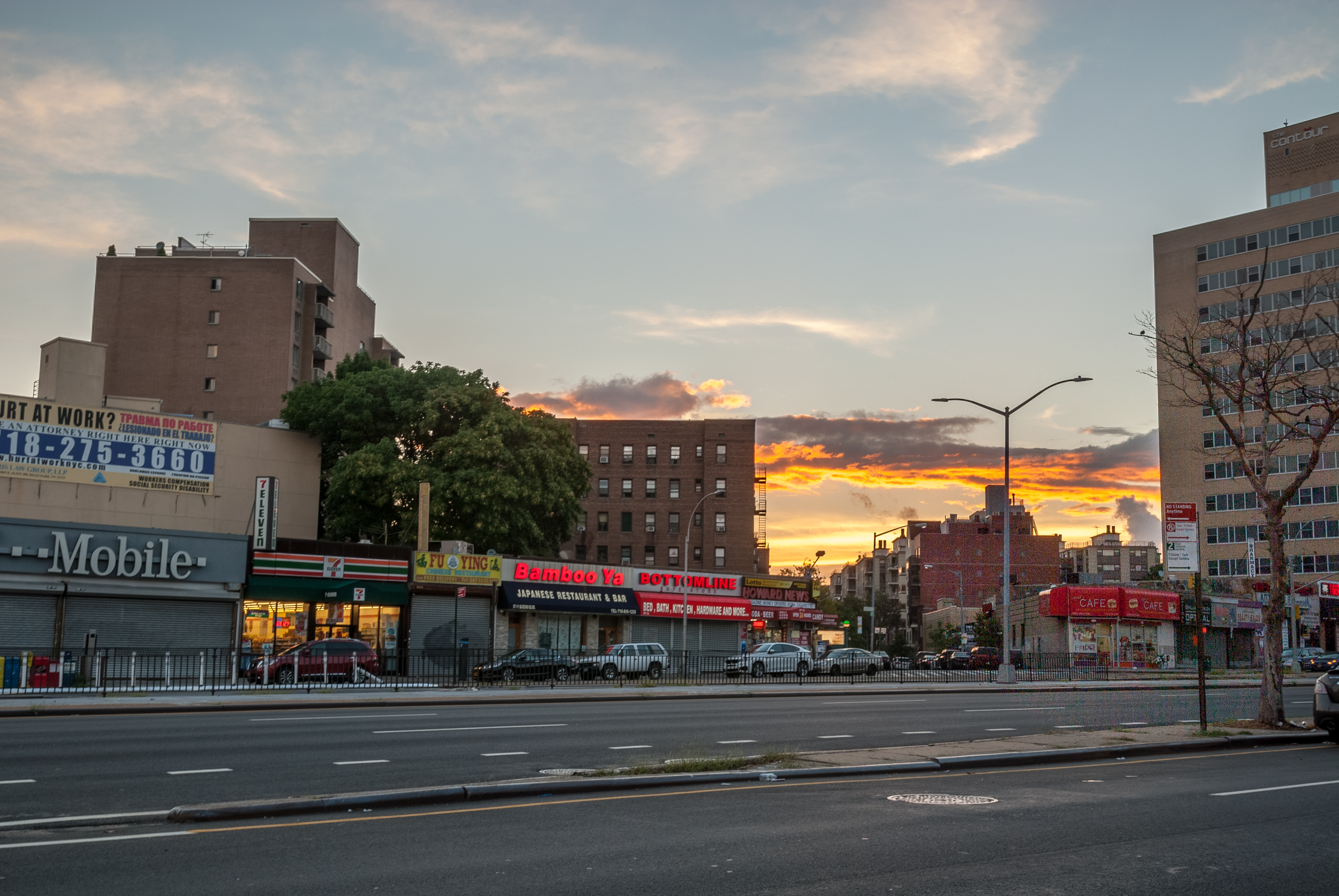
Local shops and national chains along Queens Blvd (August 2016)

Rego Park is home to some of Queens' most popular shopping destinations, including the 277,000-square-foot (25,700 m^{2}), four-floor Rego Center. Phase I has several large retailers as well as a multilevel parking garage developed by Vornado Realty Trust. Phase II opened in 2010 with 950,000 square feet (88,000 m^{2}) of retail space on 62nd Drive across from Rego Park Center, with more stores being built. It contained a small format IKEA, which opened in 2021 as the first of its type in the U.S. but closed in December 2022.

Across the Long Island Expressway, in nearby Elmhurst, is the Queens Center Mall. This mall opened on September 12, 1973, on land previously occupied by Fairyland, a supermarket, and automobile parking. The mall doubled in size from 2002 to 2004. The first Trader Joe's in Queens opened in 2007 at 9030 Metropolitan Avenue.

The main business thoroughfare of Rego Park is 63rd Drive. The main section extends from Woodhaven Boulevard in the south, to Queens Boulevard in the north, with the central business district of Rego Park nestled between Alderton Street (just south of the Long Island Rail Road overpass), and Queens Boulevard. The stretch south of Alderton is entirely residential. The business district is anchored by The Rego Park School PS 139Q, an elementary school dating from 1928 and Our Saviour Lutheran Church established in 1926 which right across Wetherole Street from PS 139Q. The business district is criss-crossed by four side streets: Saunders, Booth, Wetherole, and Austin Streets. Most of the businesses lining 63rd Drive are the original single-story "Taxpayers" dating from the 1930s.

Across Queens Boulevard to the north, 63rd Drive becomes 63rd Road, and its business district continues another three blocks; 63rd Drive actually shifts one block south of 63rd Road. There are many small businesses in this area. Shopping districts with many smaller stores, bakeries, pharmacies and restaurants can be found along 108th Street as well.

=== Landmarks ===
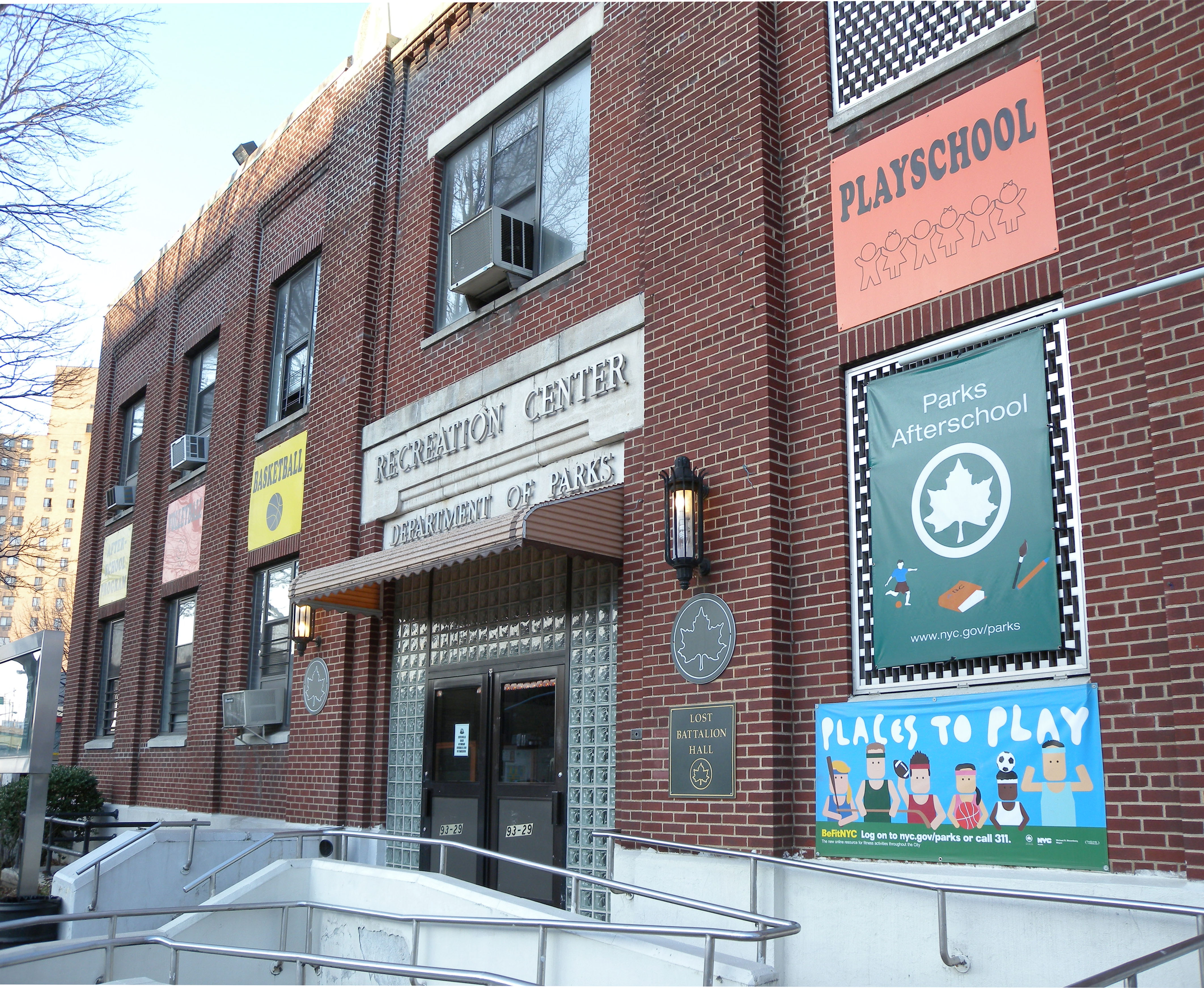
Lost Battalion Hall

The Lost Battalion Hall, on Queens Boulevard, is named after nine companies of the 77th Infantry Division who fought in World War I. (Note: The nine companies of the 77th Division were given the name The Lost Battalion in media coverage of the Meuse-Argonne Offensive in World War I. From those units, roughly 197 were killed in action and approximately 150 missing or taken prisoner and 194 remained.) The structure, which is now a community center, was erected in 1939 as a hall for the Veterans of Foreign Wars and the American Legion. It was taken over as a community center by the New York City Department of Parks and Recreation in 1960 and is still operated as such. While the VFW maintains its offices at the building, the American Legion left in 1962. The site also contains a play area and a New York City Department of Environmental Protection water pumping station.

The Drake Theater, which opened in 1935 and closed in the 1990s, was used in the 1997 film Private Parts. The theater was damaged in December 1978 after around 500 people, complaining about the theater's sound system threw beer and liquor bottles at the screen and tearing holes in it, smashing seats and the candy counter with fire extinguishers from the walls, and breaking all the glass doors at the entrance.

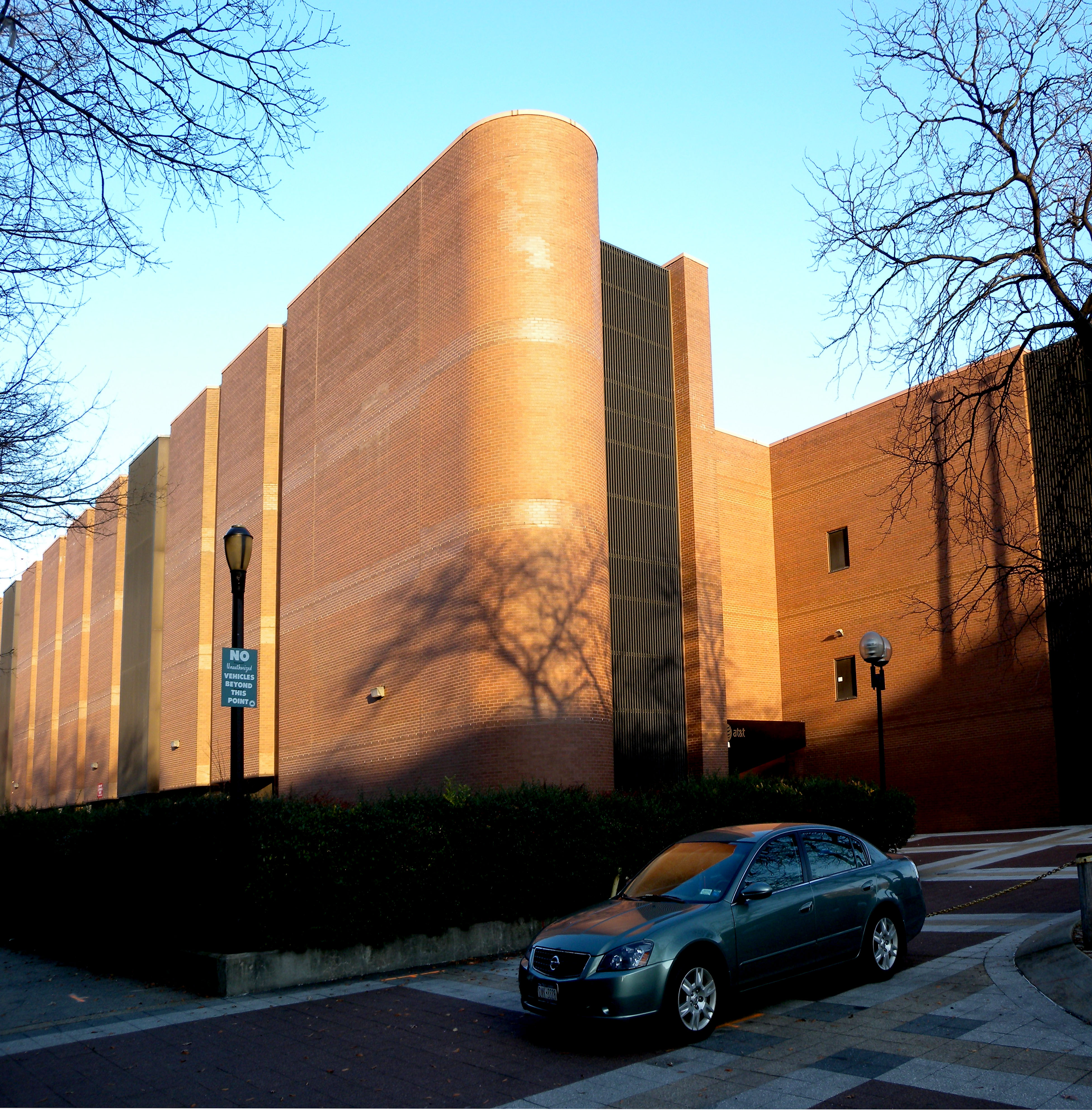
AT&T Long Lines telephone exchange

An AT&T telephone building exists at Queens Boulevard and 62nd Drive.

Our Saviour Lutheran Church, open since the 1920s, conducts its services in English and Chinese.

The art deco Rego Park Jewish Center, opened in 1939, is notable for an A. Raymond Katz-designed façade with Old Testament scenes and symbols carved into it. The building is listed on both the New York State and National Register of Historic Places.

The Trylon Theater, an art deco theater built around the time of the 1939 New York World's Fair, was converted to the home of the Education Center for Russian Jewry in 2006. After local furor over interior refurbishment, the New York City Landmarks Preservation Commission was considering landmarking the property. The theater, which closed in 2009, was repurposed into a synagogue for more than a decade, but in 2013, the synagogue's congregation objected to their new landlord's planned eviction of the synagogue. Largely composed of Russian Jews, the congregation had attempted, but failed, to buy the building in 2012.

=== Notable roads ===
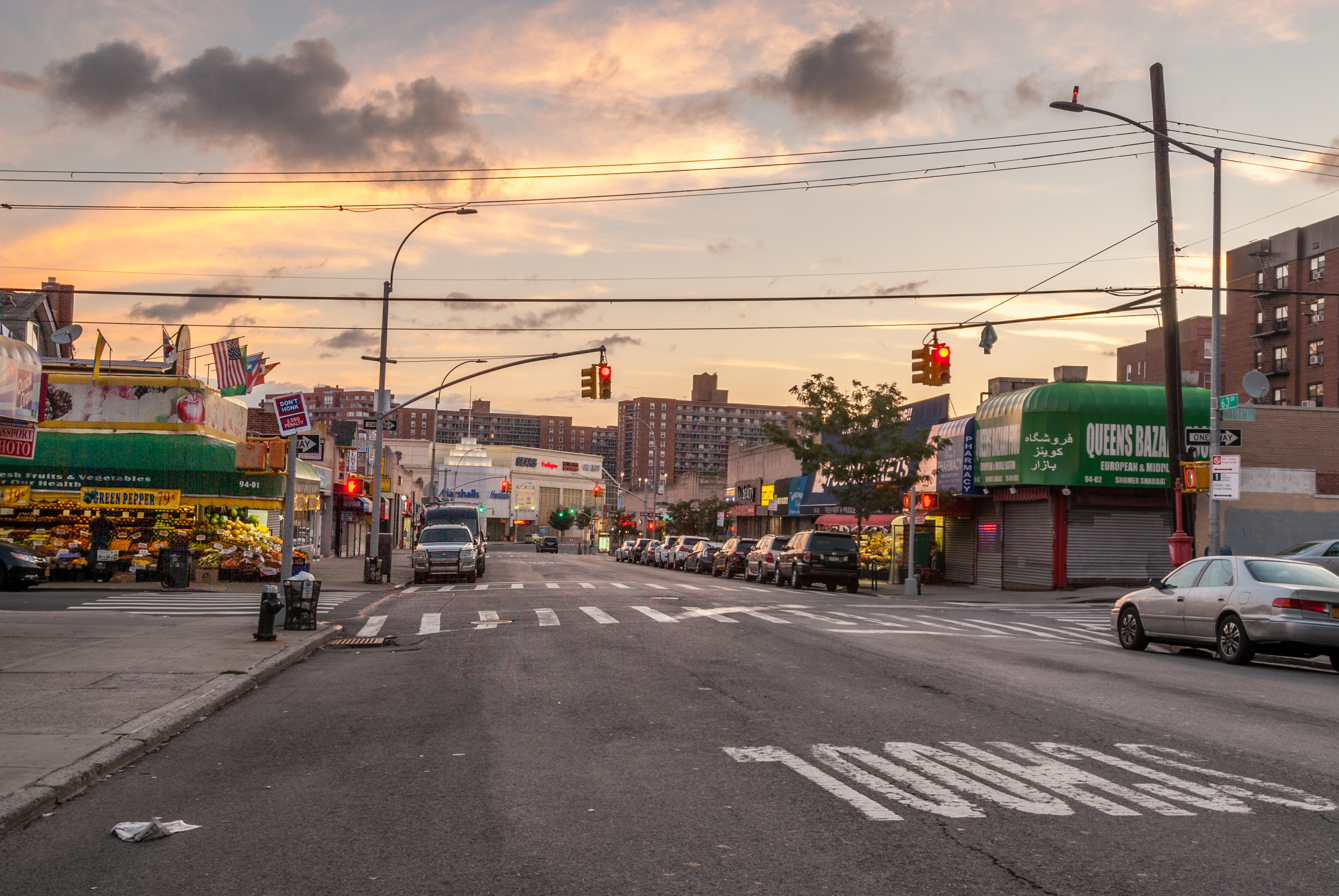
63rd Drive in Rego Park (August 2016)

- 63rd Road and Drive, the commercial artery of Rego Park, used to be Remsen's Lane, which was named after the Remsen family who lived along the road.
- The Crescents were originally composed of streets named Asquith, Boelsen, Cromwell, Dieterle, Elwell and Fitchett. These names were chosen when the Real Good Construction Company developed the area in the 1920s.
- Horace Harding Expressway was once a turnpike called Nassau Boulevard and went from Elmhurst to Flushing, Bayside, and Little Neck. It was renamed for Horace J. Harding (1863–1929), a finance magnate who directed the New York, New Haven and Hartford Railroad and the New York Municipal Railways System; Harding encouraged city planner Robert Moses's system of parkways on New York, and after Harding died, the boulevard—and later, service road to the Long Island Expressway—was renamed after him.
- Queens Boulevard, a wide at-grade highway that stretches from Long Island City to Jamaica, was formerly composed of two small dirt roads: Old Jamaica Road and Hoffman Boulevard. In the 1910s, it was paved and widened to 12 lanes. It is sometimes called the "Boulevard of Death" because of the high fatality rate of pedestrians trying to cross the 12-lane boulevard.
- Woodhaven Boulevard was known as Trotting Course Lane because it was named when horses were the main mode of transport. The lane dates back to the colonial days and used to run along Whitepot's border Although it extends to Cross Bay Boulevard in the Rockaways, two small parts of the original lane still exist in Forest Hills.
- Yellowstone Boulevard was one of a few colonial roads in the area. It was named after the area's original name.

== Community activism ==
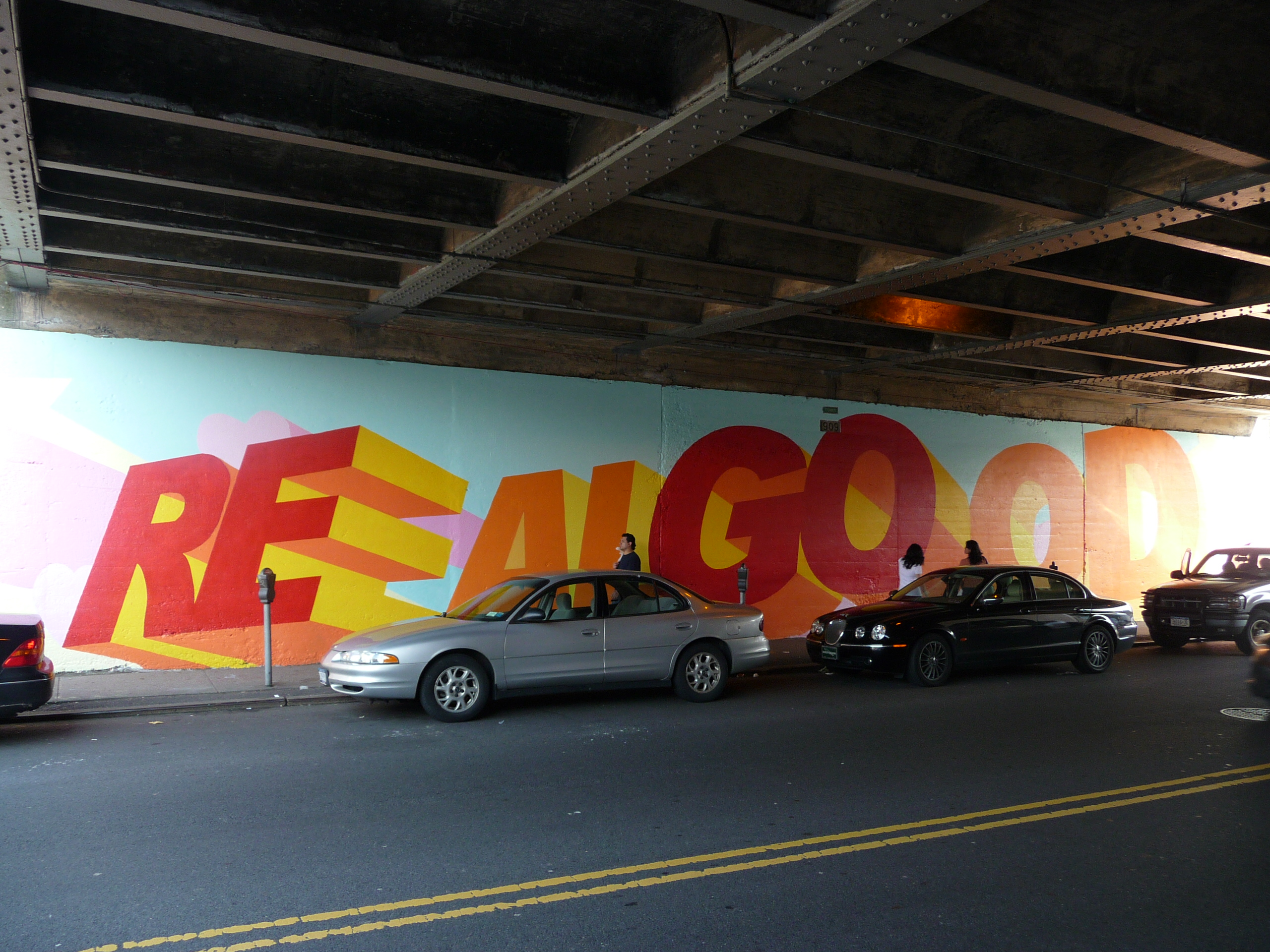
"REal GOod" mural on 63rd Drive at the LIRR overpass

The Rego Park Green Alliance has been active in the community planting flowers and trees, arranging the installation of new garbage cans, pushing for the repair of some sidewalks and creating a large mural celebrating the neighborhood under the LIRR overpass on 63rd Drive.

In March 2010, the Metropolitan Council on Jewish Poverty, a beneficiary agency of the UJA-Federation of New York, partnered with Masbia in the opening of a kosher soup kitchen on Queens Boulevard. As of August 2010, the free restaurant was serving over 1,500 meals per month to adults, senior citizens, and families.

In addition, there are two opposing proposals for the redevelopment of the abandoned 3.5-mile (5.6 km) Rockaway Beach Branch, which runs from Rego Park south to Ozone Park. One group, Friends of the Queensway, wants to turn the rail line into parkland. Another group, QueensLink, proposes a dual use for the corridor, with a subway extension and park space.

== Police and crime ==
Rego Park and Forest Hills are patrolled by the 112th Precinct of the NYPD, located at 68-40 Austin Street. The 112th Precinct ranked 6th safest out of 69 patrol areas for per-capita crime in 2010. DNAinfo attributed the area's low crime rate to its seclusion and reputation as a "suburb within the city" As of 2018, with a non-fatal assault rate of 14 per 100,000 people, Rego Park and Forest Hills's rate of violent crimes per capita is less than that of the city as a whole. The incarceration rate of 102 per 100,000 people is lower than that of the city as a whole.

The 112th Precinct has a lower crime rate than in the 1990s, with crimes across all categories having decreased by 91.5% between 1990 and 2018. The precinct reported 0 murders, 18 rapes, 41 robberies, 53 felony assaults, 69 burglaries, 403 grand larcenies, and 37 grand larcenies auto in 2018.

== Fire safety ==
There are no fire stations in Rego Park itself, but the surrounding area contains two New York City Fire Department (FDNY) fire stations:

- Engine Co. 305/Ladder Co. 151 – 111-02 Queens Boulevard, in Forest Hills
- Engine Co. 319 – 78-11 67th Road, in Middle Village

== Health ==
As of 2018, preterm births and births to teenage mothers are less common in Rego Park and Forest Hills than in other places citywide. In Rego Park and Forest Hills, there were 66 preterm births per 1,000 live births (compared to 87 per 1,000 citywide), and 4.6 births to teenage mothers per 1,000 live births (compared to 19.3 per 1,000 citywide). Rego Park and Forest Hills have a low population of residents who are uninsured. In 2018, this population of uninsured residents was estimated to be 11%, slightly lower than the citywide rate of 12%.

The concentration of fine particulate matter, the deadliest type of air pollutant, in Rego Park and Forest Hills is 0.0075 milligrams per cubic metre (7.5×10^{−9} oz/ft^{3}), equal to the city average. Ten percent of Rego Park and Forest Hills residents are smokers, which is lower than the city average of 14% of residents being smokers. In Rego Park and Forest Hills, 19% of residents are obese, 7% are diabetic, and 20% have high blood pressure—compared to the citywide averages of 20%, 14%, and 24% respectively. In addition, 11% of children are obese, compared to the citywide average of 20%.

Ninety-three percent of residents eat some fruits and vegetables every day, which is higher than the city's average of 87%. In 2018, 82% of residents described their health as "good", "very good", or "excellent", higher than the city's average of 78%. For every supermarket in Rego Park and Forest Hills, there are 5 bodegas.

The nearest large hospitals are the Elmhurst Hospital Center in Elmhurst and Long Island Jewish Forest Hills in Forest Hills.

== Post office and ZIP Code ==
Rego Park is covered by ZIP Code 11374. The United States Post Office operates the Rego Park Station at 9224 Queens Boulevard.

== Education ==
Rego Park and Forest Hills generally have a higher percentage of college-educated residents than the rest of the city as of 2018. The majority of residents (62%) have a college education or higher, while 8% have less than a high school education and 30% are high school graduates or have some college education. By contrast, 39% of Queens residents and 43% of city residents have a college education or higher. The percentage of Rego Park and Forest Hills students excelling in math rose from 42% in 2000 to 61% in 2011, and reading achievement rose from 48% to 49% during the same time period.

Rego Park and Forest Hills's rate of elementary school student absenteeism is less than the rest of New York City. In Rego Park and Forest Hills, 10% of elementary school students missed twenty or more days per school year, lower than the citywide average of 20%. Additionally, 91% of high school students in Rego Park and Forest Hills graduate on time, more than the citywide average of 75%.

=== Public schools ===
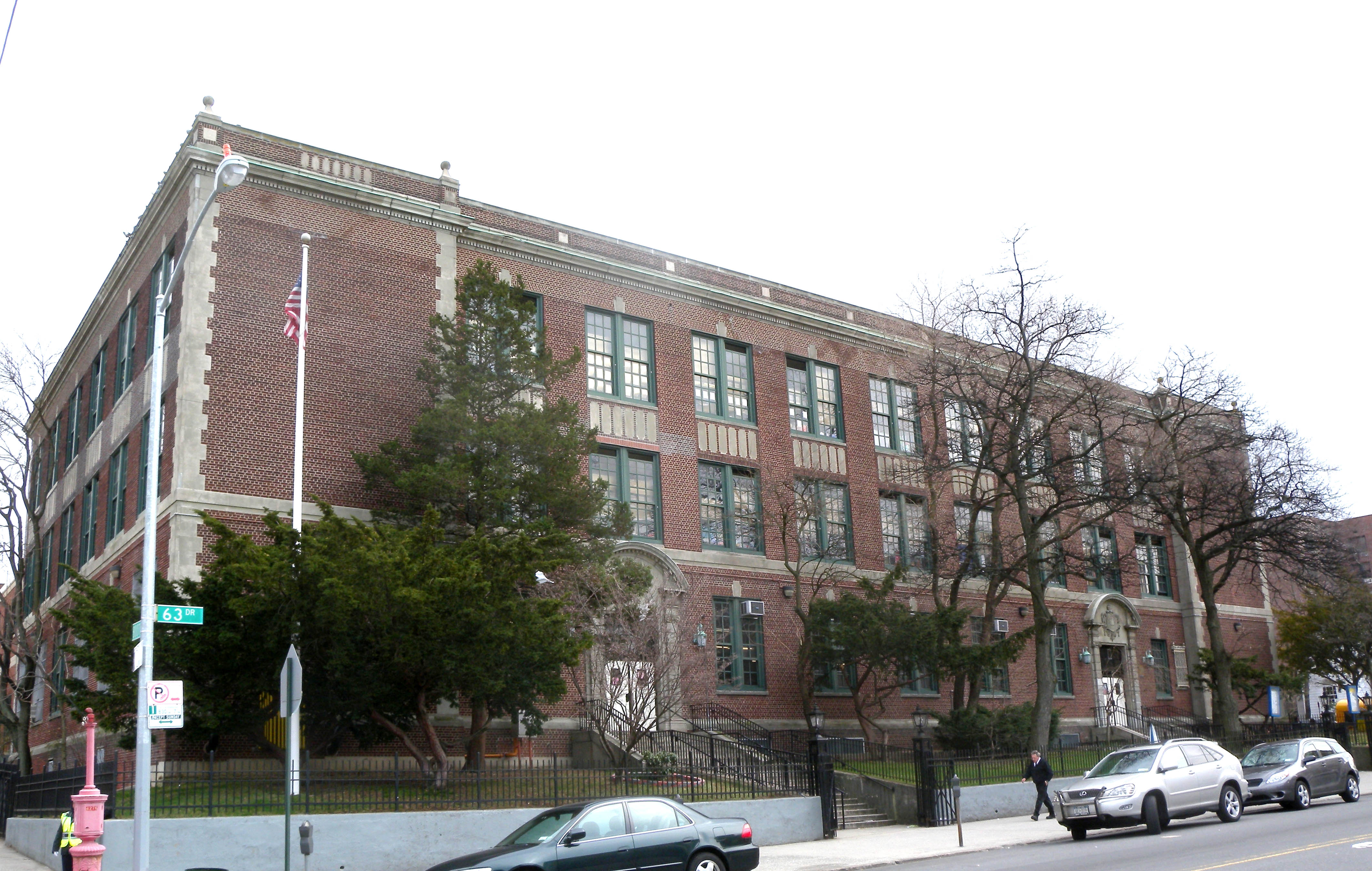
PS 139

Rego Park's public schools, as are the public schools in all of New York City, are operated by the New York City Department of Education. The following elementary schools serve Rego Park and serve grades PK-5 unless otherwise indicated:

- P.S. 139 (Rego Park School, grades K–5)
- P.S. 174 (William Sidney Mount School)
- P.S. 175 (the Lynn Gross Discovery School)
- P.S. 206 (the Horace Harding School, grades K–5)
- P.S. 220 (Edward Mandel School)

All areas in Rego Park are zoned to J.H.S. 157 Stephen A. Halsey (6–9), in Rego Park, or J.H.S. 190 Russell Sage (7–9) in Forest Hills. Rego Park is not zoned to a high school because all New York City high schools get students by application, though Forest Hills High School is located in nearby Forest Hills.

=== Private schools ===
Our Lady of the Angelus, a PK–8 private school operated by the Roman Catholic Diocese of Brooklyn, is located in Rego Park. Resurrection-Ascension School, another PK–8 private school operated by the Diocese of Brooklyn, is also located in Rego Park.

Our Saviour Lutheran School, K-8, is on Woodhaven Boulevard and is a ministry of Our Saviour Lutheran Church on 63rd Drive.

Private institutions include the Rego Park Jewish Center and the Jewish Institute of Queens (also known as the Queens Gymnasia).

=== Charter Schools ===
Valence College Preparatory Charter school is a 5-8 grade school located in Rego Park. Central Queens Academy Charter school I is another school located in Rego Park from grades K-8.

=== Library ===
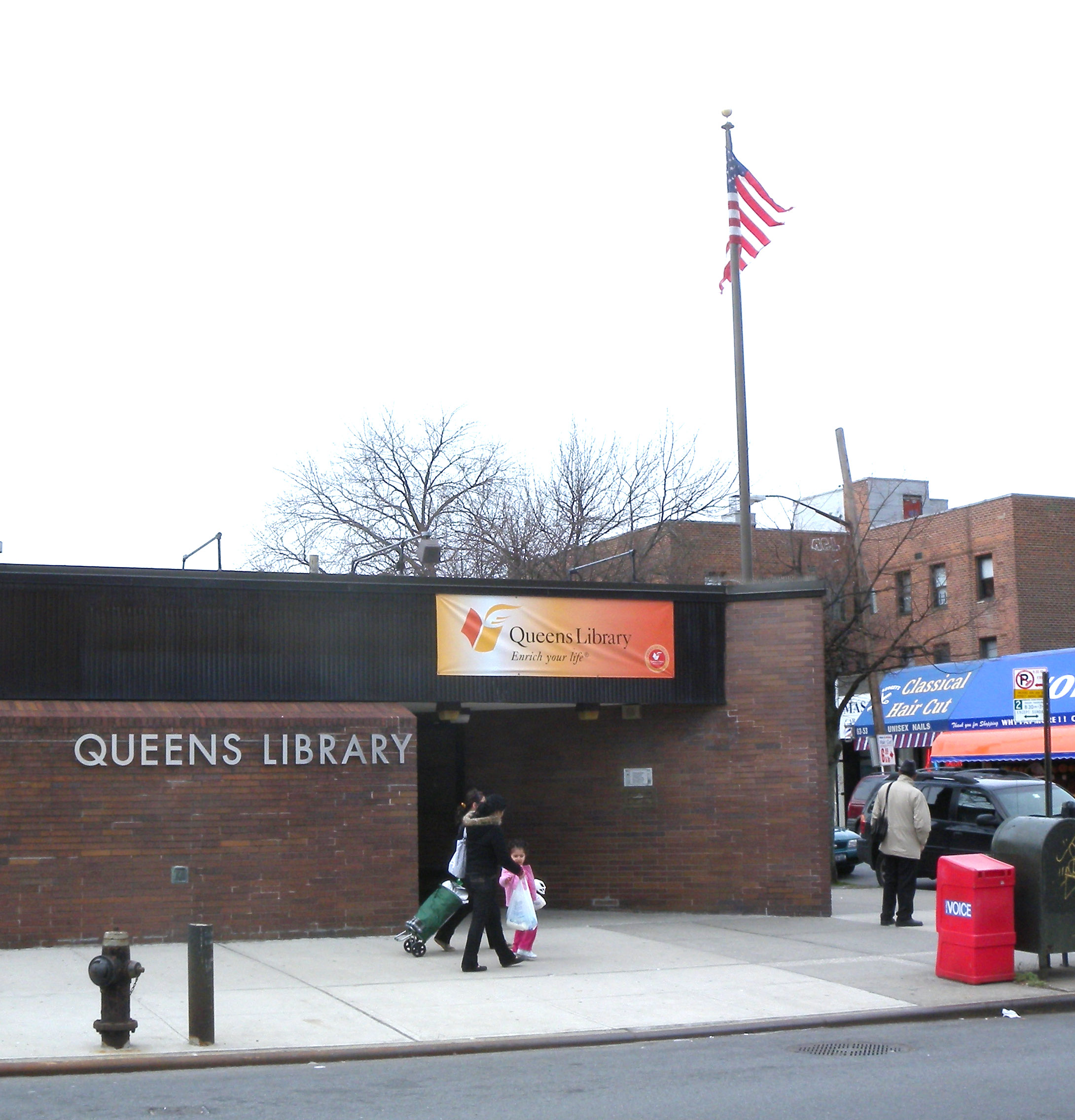
The Queens Public Library's Rego Park branch

The Queens Public Library's Rego Park branch is located at 91-41 63rd Drive. It had 189,000 visitors and a total circulation of 194,000 in 2016. The existing one-story 7,500-square-foot (700 m^{2}) branch, built in 1975, is planned to be replaced with a two-story, 18,000-square-foot (1,700 m^{2}) building between 2021 and 2024.

== Transportation ==
Center entrance for the 63rd Drive subway station (M/R trains) in fall 2026

The IND Queens Boulevard Line of the New York City Subway has local stations at 63rd Drive and 67th Avenue, served by the E, F, M, and R trains. The line, running under Queens Boulevard, dates from 1935 to 1937.

The Q11, Q14, Q23, Q29, Q38, Q52 SBS, Q53 SBS, Q54, Q59, Q60, Q72, Q88 and Q98 local buses serve the neighborhood, as well as the QM10, QM11, QM12, QM15, QM18, QM40, QM42 and BM5 express buses.

The Long Island Rail Road overpass between Austin and Alderton Streets was the location of the Rego Park station until its abandonment in 1962. Though physically part of the Main Line, the station was only served by Rockaway Beach Branch trains. The station was later dismantled, and little can be discerned of its existence now save for the flattened clearing beside the tracks.

== In popular culture ==
- In the graphic novel Maus, Art Spiegelman visits his father Vladek at his house in Rego Park.
- The 2013 film The Wolf of Wall Street was filmed in part in Rego Park, at the now-demolished Shalimar Diner.
- The CBS television sitcom The King of Queens is set in Rego Park and the main characters live at the fictional 3121 Aberdeen St.

== Notable residents ==
Notable current and former residents of Rego Park include:

- Kenny Anderson (born 1970), former professional basketball player.
- David Baltimore (1938–2025), Nobel Prize-winning virologist
- Felix Biederman, co-host of Chapo Trap House
- Lili Bosse (née Toren, born 1961), lived in Rego Park until age 9, mayor of Beverly Hills, California.
- John Brandon (1929–2014), film and television actor
- Sid Caesar (1922–2014), actor and comedian
- Eddie Egan (1930–1995), New York City Police Department detective
- Vera-Ellen (1921–1981), actress and dancer
- Rosco Gordon (1928–2002), blues singer and songwriter
- June Havoc (1912–2010), actress
- Aram Haigaz (1900–1986), Armenian writer
- Steve Hofstetter (born 1979), comedian, radio personality
- August Howard (1910–1988), founder of the American Polar Society in 1934
- Malika Kalontarova (born 1950), Central Asian dancer known as the "Queen of Eastern Dance" (People's Artist of USSR)
- Fatima Kuinova (1926–2021), Central Asian singer, one of the leading singers in the Soviet Union (Merited Artist of USSR)
- Gypsy Rose Lee (1911–1970), burlesque entertainer
- Robert Lipsyte (born 1938), sports journalist
- Frank Lorenzo (born 1940), businessman best known for his takeover of Continental Airlines, Eastern Air Lines and Texas International Airlines.
- Joe Nichols (1905–1984), sportswriter for The New York Times.
- Tommy Ramone (1949–2014), drummer of The Ramones
- Dave Rubinstein (1964–1993), singer of Reagan Youth
- Bobby Schayer (born 1966), former drummer of Bad Religion
- Fred Silverman (1937–2020), television producer
- Art Spiegelman (born 1948), Pulitzer Prize–winning graphic artist who made Rego Park the setting for significant scenes involving his aged father in Maus, his graphic novel about the Holocaust
- Donald A. Wollheim (1914–1990), science fiction editor, publisher and author.
