= Rego Park Jewish Center =

Conservative synagogue in New York City

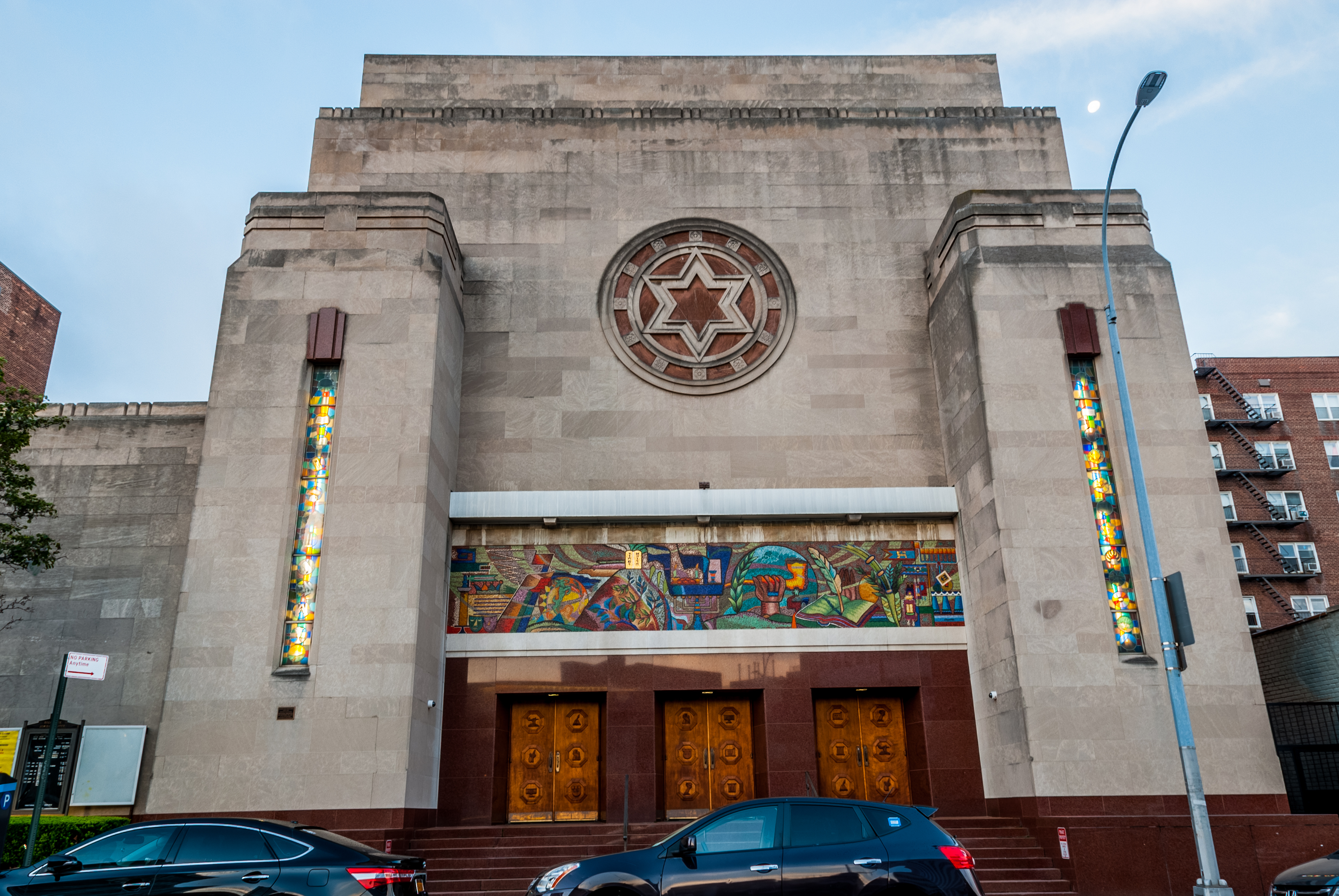
- Main building from Queens Blvd

- Location in Queens, New York City

Religion
- Affiliation: Conservative Judaism
- Ecclesiastical or organisational status: Synagogue
- Leadership: Rabbi Romiel Daniel
- Status: Active

Location
- Location: 97-30 Queens Boulevard, Rego Park, Queens, New York City, New York
- Country: United States
- Coordinates: 40°43′49″N 73°51′34″W

Architecture
- Architect: Frank Grad
- Type: Synagogue
- Style: Moderne architecture
- Established: 1939 (as a congregation)
- Completed: 1948

Website
- rpjc.or
- Rego Park Jewish Center
- U.S. National Register of Historic Places
- Area: less than one acre
- NRHP reference No.: 09000864
- Added to NRHP: October 28, 2009

The Rego Park Jewish Center is a Conservative synagogue located in the Rego Park neighborhood of Queens, New York City, New York, United States.

Designed by the architectural firm of Frank Grad & Sons, the Art Deco Streamline Moderne building was completed in 1948. The façade features a mosaic by Hungarian-born artist A. Raymond Katz.

The building is listed on both the New York State and National Register of Historic Places.

In May 2026, the synagogue was one of the targets of a crime spree of vandalism with antisemitic graffiti and swastikas in Rego Park and Forest Hills that also struck Congregation Machane Chodosh, along with homes, businesses, and vehicles. New York public officials condemned the actions as hate crimes, including Governor Kathy Hochul, as well as Mayor Zohran Mamdani, who called the incidents "a deliberate act of antisemitic hatred meant to instill fear".

== Gallery ==
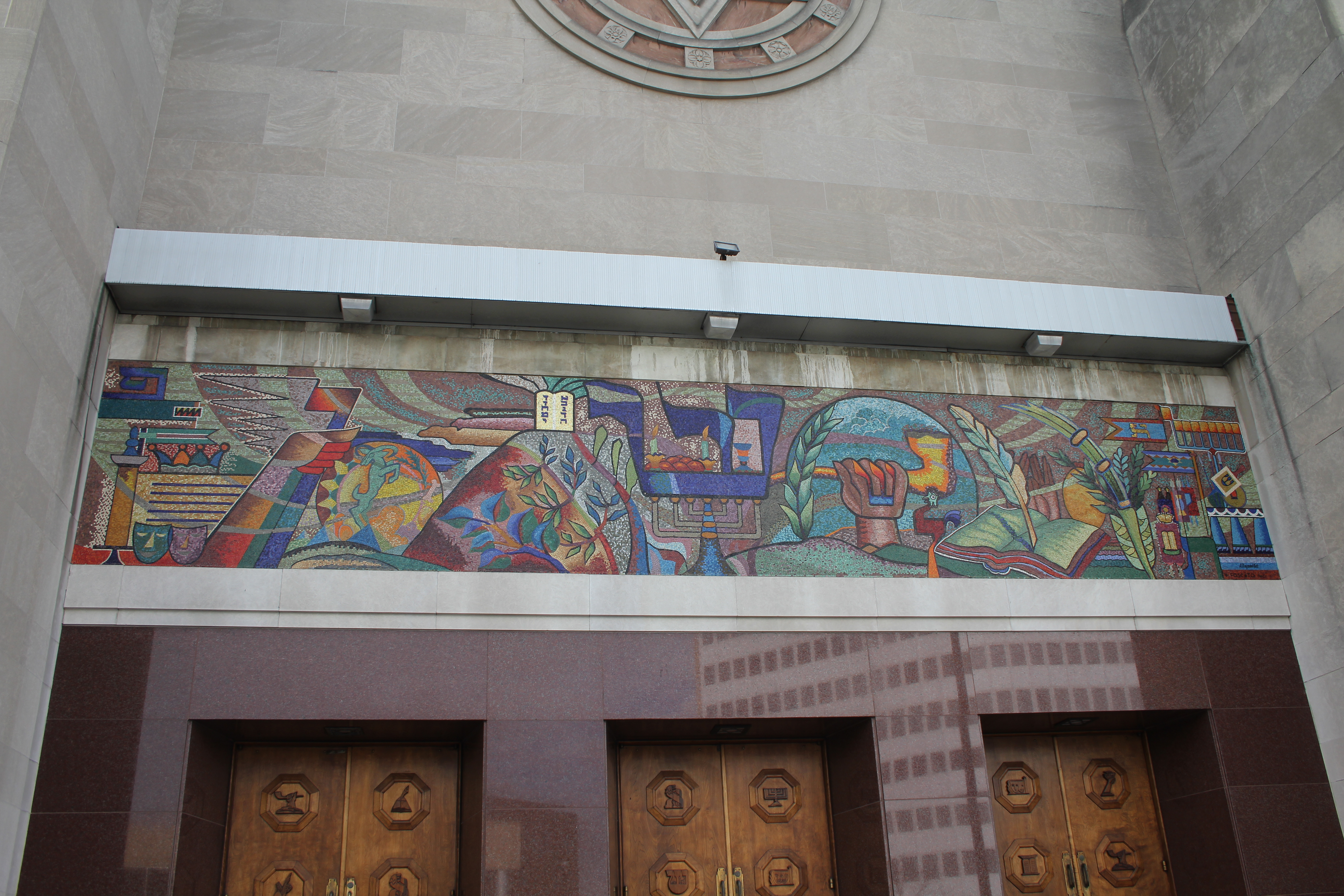
Mosaic by A. Raymond Katz

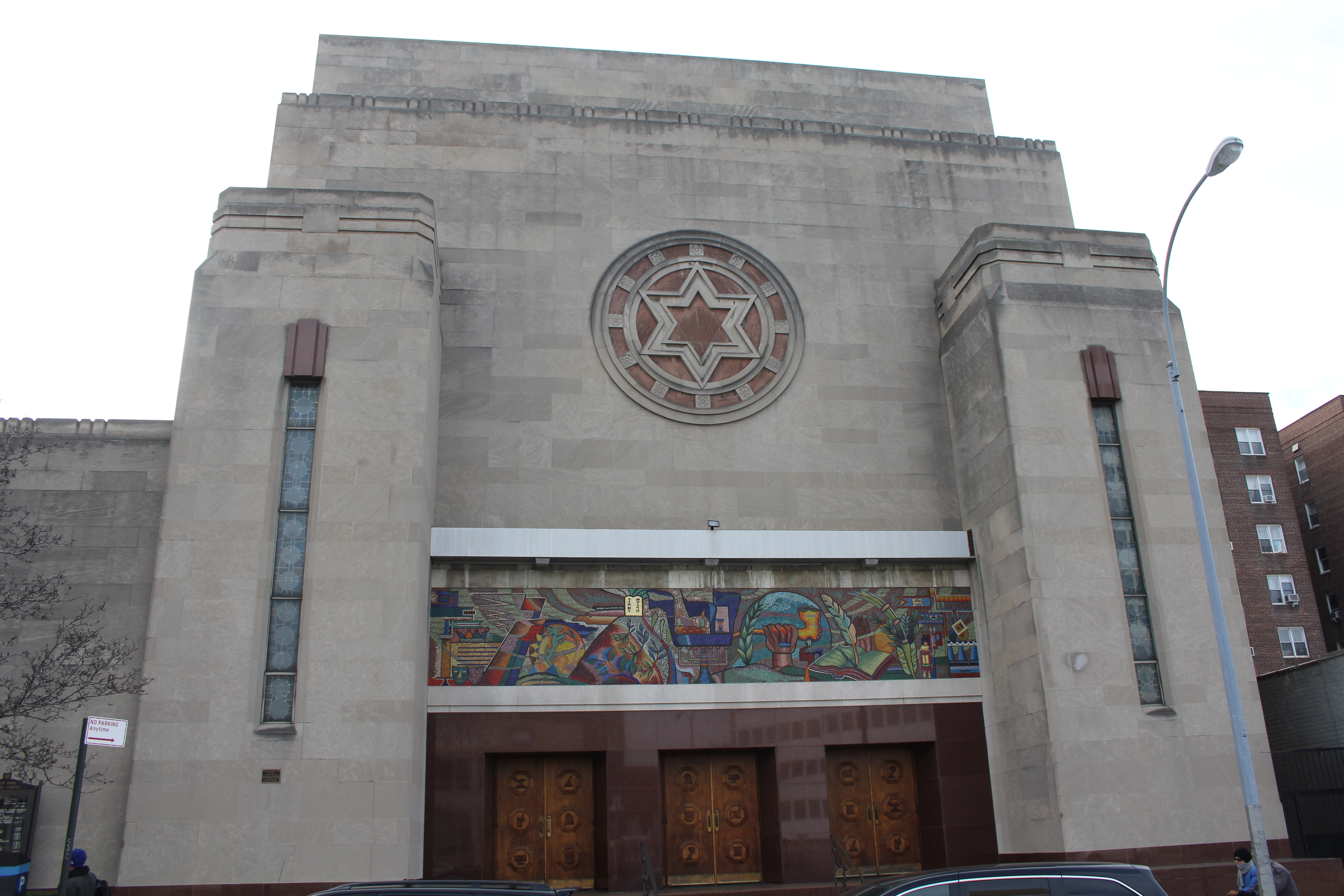
Main building

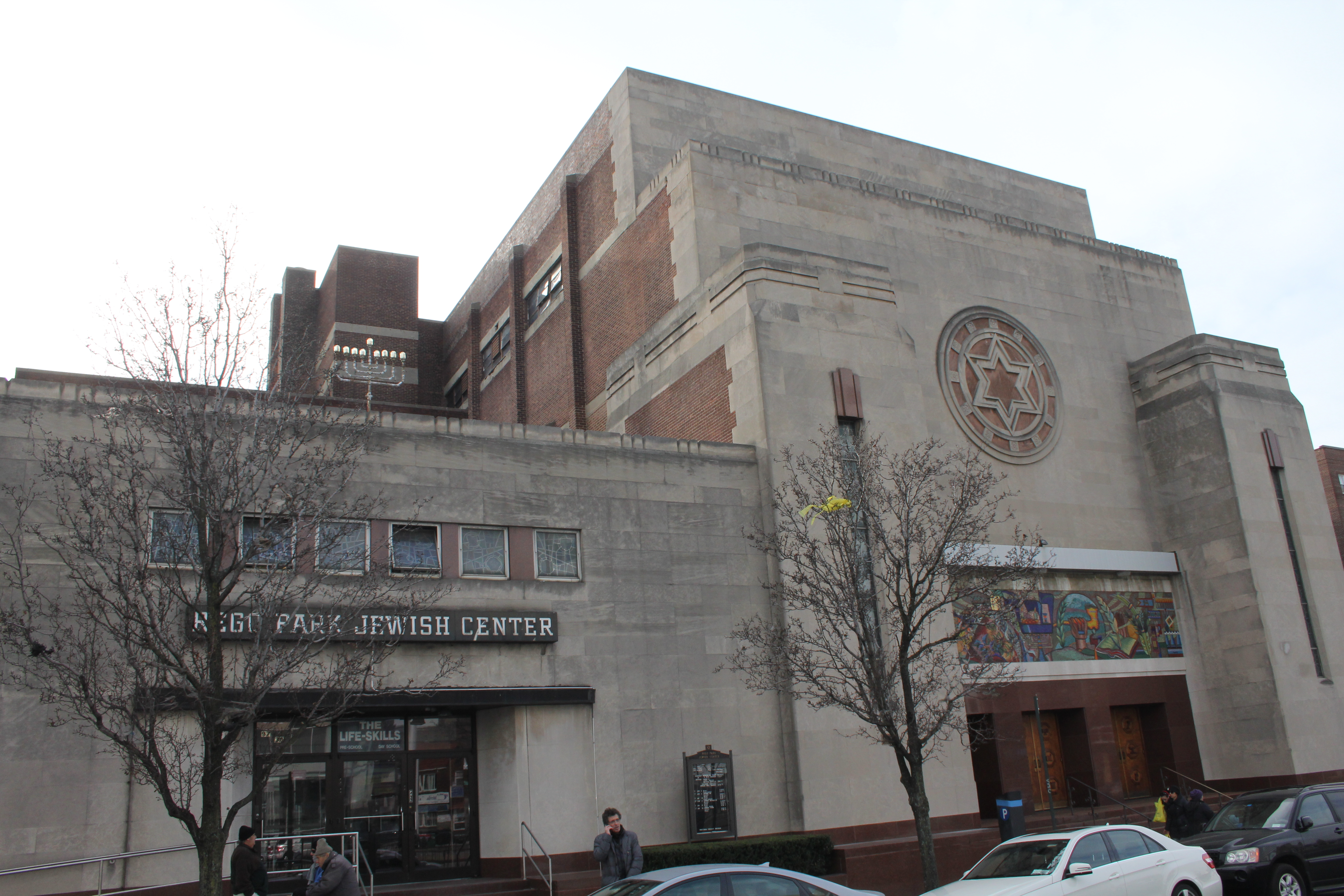
Entire complex as seen from Queens Blvd.

== See also ==
- National Register of Historic Places listings in Queens, New York
