= August Howard =

Founder of the American Polar Society

- Born: August Horowitz; January 2, 1910
- Died: December 4, 1988 (aged 78); Rego Park, New York
- Known for: American Polar Society

August Howard (January 2, 1910 - December 4, 1988) was the founder of the American Polar Society in 1934 and publisher of The Polar Times. In 1948 Cape Howard was named for him.

== Biography ==
He was born on January 2, 1910, as August Horowitz to a Russian immigrant who worked as a tailor. In 1934 he founded the American Polar Society. He was a public affairs officer of the National Council of the Boy Scouts of America from 1928 to 1970. He died on December 4, 1988, in Rego Park, New York.
