= Queens Community Board 6 =

Queens Community District 6 Queens Community Board 6
- Community District
- Country: United States
- State: New York
- City: New York City
- Borough: Queens
- Neighborhoods: list: Forest Hills; Rego Park

Government
  - Type: Community board
  - Body: Queens Community Board 6
  - Chairperson: Salua Baida
  - District Manager: Christine Nolan

Area
  - Total: 3.0 sq mi (7.8 km^{2})

Population (2020)
  - Total: 119,706
  - Density: 40,000/sq mi (15,000/km^{2})

Ethnicity
  - African-American: 2.9%
  - Asian: 31.0%
  - Hispanic and Latino Americans: 16.4%
  - White: 43.9%
  - Others: 3.1%
- Time zone: UTC−5 (Eastern)
  - Summer (DST): UTC−4 (EDT)
- ZIP codes: 11374, and 11375
- Area codes: 718, 347, and 929, and 917
- Police Precincts: 112th (website)
- Website: www1.nyc.gov/site/queenscb6/index.page

The Queens Community Board 6 is the local government body in the New York City borough of Queens, encompassing the neighborhoods of Forest Hills and Rego Park. It is delimited by the Horace Harding Expressway to the north, Woodhaven Boulevard to the west, the Jackie Robinson Parkway to the south, and the Grand Central Parkway on the east.

The Queens Community Board 6 office is located at 104-01 Metropolitan Avenue, Forest Hills, NY 11375
