= American Polar Society =

Society founded in 1934

The American Polar Society was founded in 1934 by August Howard.

The Polar Times is the publication of the American Polar Society. It was first published by August Howard in 1935. In 1946 the Polar Times Glacier was named in honor of the publication.

== Honorary members ==
Starting in 1936 the following explorers, arctic scientists and geographers have been honored:

- David Legge Brainard (1936). He was the first to receive an honorary membership.
- Richard Evelyn Byrd (1938).
- Vilhjalmur Stefansson (1940).
- Lincoln Ellsworth (1944).
- Frank Debenham (1949). He died in 1965.
- Paul Allman Siple (1957). He died in 1968.
- Louise Arner Boyd (1959).
- Finn Ronne (1960). He died in 1980.
- Jackie Ronne. She died in 2009.
- Bernt Balchen (1966)
- Laurence McKinley Gould (1969)
- Thomas Charles Poulter (1973)
- Richard B. Black (1979). He died in 1992.
- Norman Dane Vaughan (1980)
- Lincoln A. Washburn (1981)
- Charles F. Passel (1982)
- Thomas H. Manning (1983)
- Conrad Shinn (1984)
- Graham Westbrook Rowley (1985)
- Waldo Kampmeier Lyon (1986)
- William Robert Anderson (1987)
- Joseph Otis Fletcher (1988)
- Norbert Untersteiner (1989)
- Max C. Brewer (1990)
- James Francis Calvert (1991)
- Martin Arthur Pomerantz (1992)
- James R. Reedy (1993)
- Beaumont Buck (1994)
- David C. Nutt (1995)
- Charles R. Bentley (1996)
- Wilford Frank Weeks (1997). He was born in 1929.
- Kenneth Utuayuk Toovak (1998)
- Robert Hoxie Rutford (1998)
- Anthony J. Gow (2004)
- James Van Allen (2006)
- Susan Solomon (2013)
