= Alexander Raymond Katz =

Modernist artist (1895–1974)

- Born: Sándor Katz; April 21, 1895; Kassa, Kingdom of Hungary
- Died: March 24, 1974 (aged 78); Miami Beach, Florida
- Education: Chicago Academy of Fine Arts
- Style: Modernism
- Spouse: Elsie Engel Katz

Alexander Raymond Katz (April 21, 1895 – March 24, 1974) was a modernist artist working in painting and illustration. Katz is known for his versatility and his extensive use of contemporary styles, and his many works depicting themes from Chicago, his longtime home.

Born Sándor Katz in the Kingdom of Hungary, Katz immigrated to the United States at 14. His studies at the Art Institute of Chicago brought him into the field of commercial design, where he worked on interior decoration for movie palaces and graphic design for posters. Katz's later designs often incorporated interpretive depictions of the Hebrew alphabet, and are seen widely in synagogues across the United States.

== Early life and education ==
Sándor Katz was born in Kassa, Abaúj-Torna County, Kingdom of Hungary on April 21, 1895. Katz was born to a wealthy family, the son of a reputable tailor. His family's business specialized in military uniforms, which were distributed across Southern Europe, as far away as Turkey.

Katz moved to New York when he was fourteen, where his birth name, Sándor, was changed to Alexander. Katz inserted the middle name Raymond around then, in line with contemporary trends. Already involved in art from a young age, Katz intended to study art at the Cooper Union and draw cartoons for New York's German-language newspapers, but he found little success. Katz instead moved to Chicago, where he worked in the lithography business for seven years.

Katz prospered in Chicago as World War I was devastating his family in Hungary. By the age of 19, he was able to raise the funds to bring his parents and four siblings to the United States. After World War I, he toured the Western United States and Canada, staying in Los Angeles for some time and becoming familiar with the growing motion picture business. Following his tour of the Western states, Katz returned to Chicago, and enrolled at the Chicago Academy of Fine Arts in 1922.

== Early career ==
While in school, Katz expanded into the Chicago film industry, designing decorations for the movie palaces of the rapidly-expanding Balaban and Katz Theater Corporation. A likely influence on Katz was the works of Abel Pann, the Jerusalem-based artist whose works dealt extensively with interpretations of the Hebrew alphabet.

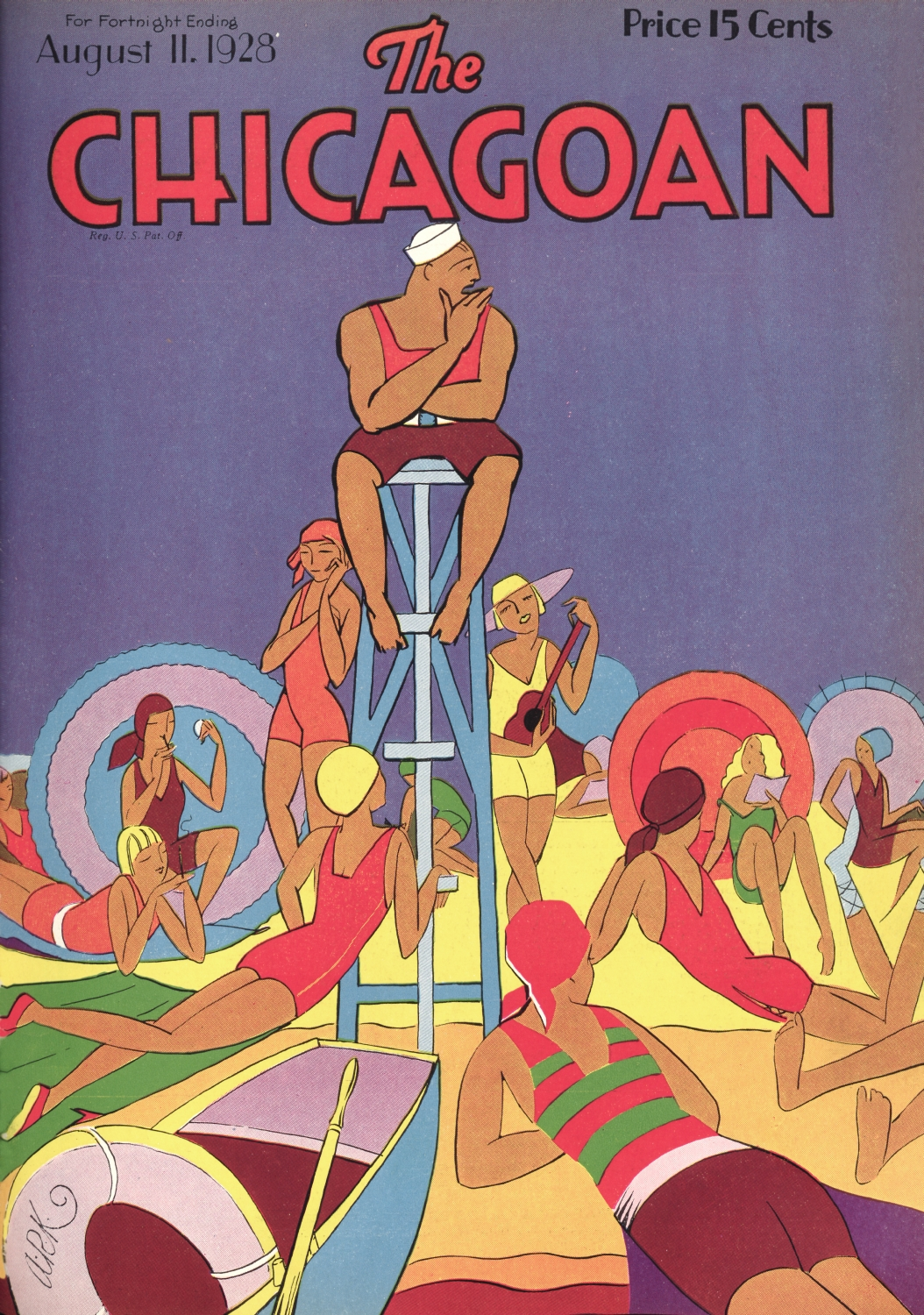
Katz's cover for The Chicagoan Vol. 5, No. 10, titled Beached

Katz was able to travel back to Europe in 1927, first briefly visiting Italy. He stayed in his hometown, which had since become Košice, Czechoslovakia, for six months. Katz was given the use of a fully-funded studio by the local government, enabling him to reconnect with his Jewish heritage and focus more on fine art, influences that continued after his return to Chicago.

Returning to Chicago, Katz created posters for Paramount Studios and the Chicago Civic Opera. Katz was also a regular contributor to The Chicagoan, creating covers for 17 of its issues, signed as Sándor. Katz regularly used Sándor as a signature on some of his secular, commercial works. Katz's line drawings were also prominently featured inside the magazine, credited as A. Raymond Katz.

== Century of Progress and Great Depression ==
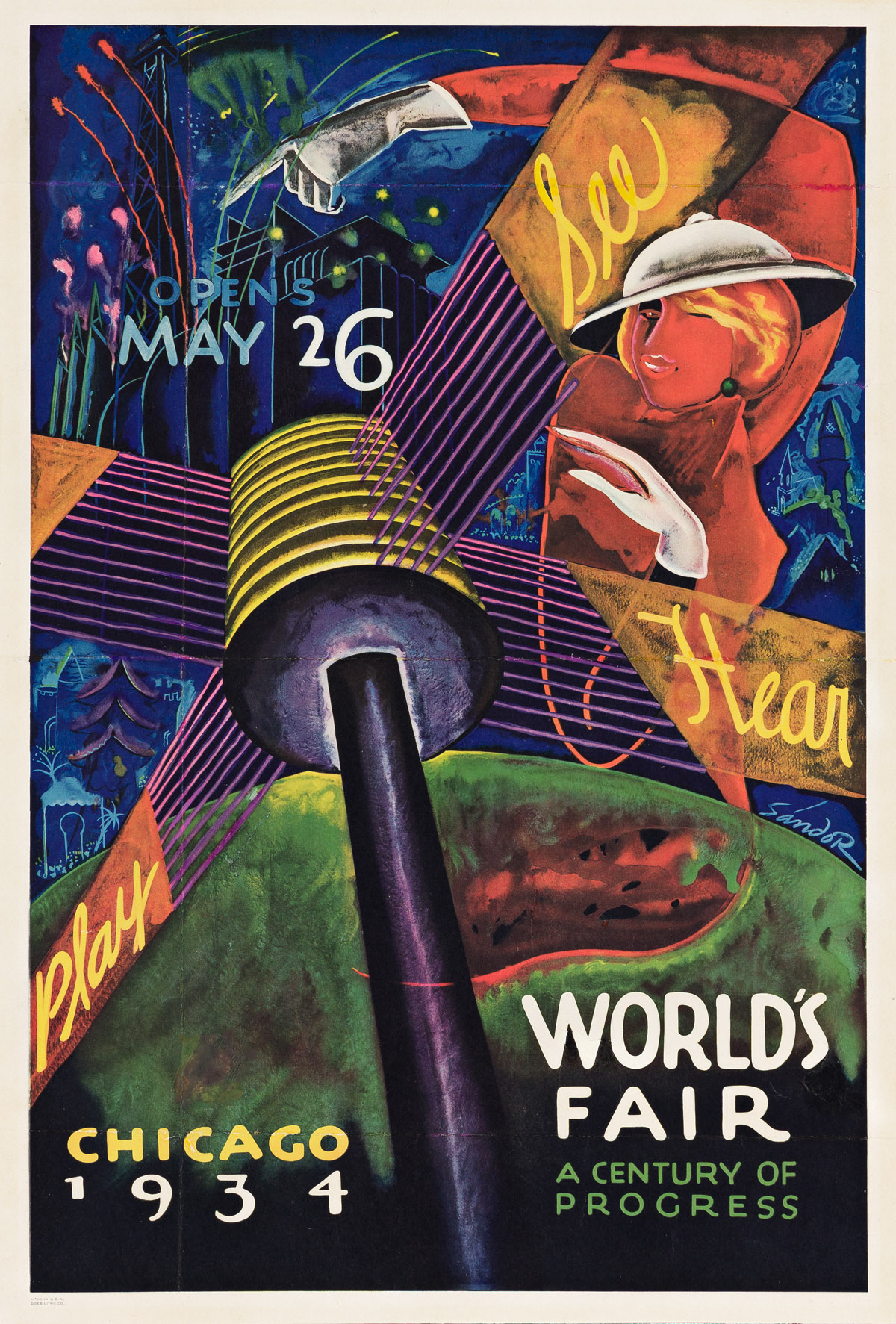
Poster for the 1934 edition of the Century of Progress exhibition, by Katz

Katz was encouraged to take up mural painting by Frank Lloyd Wright, and his murals were featured at the Century of Progress exhibition of 1933-1934. In particular, his murals in the Hall of Religion featured his signature style of the Hebrew alphabet. Katz's work for the fair extended to poster design in 1934.

A notable example of Katz's works in murals is in the Loop Synagogue in Chicago, where his 1936 interpretation of the Ten Commandments is believed to be the first mural in an Orthodox synagogue.

During the Great Depression, Katz worked with the Works Progress Administration (WPA) as a mural painter. A notable example of Katz's work for the United States government is "Assimilation and Immigration Into The Industrial Life of Madison," a Post Office mural in Madison, Illinois. The Department of the Treasury, responsible for the construction, commissioned the piece in 1936 for $580, equivalent to $13,000 in 2025.

Katz's work in oil painting is well-represented by Chicago Street Scene, created in the late 1930s. This piece embodies neighborhood friendship that was being forgotten during the Depression, while also showing the poverty that contributed to its loss. Townsfolk are walking the streets with horse-drawn transportation and wheelbarrows surrounded in lifeless trees. Contrasting this melancholy scene of the Depression is a vibrant color scheme to remind the viewers of the beauty still lingering in that difficult period.

An example of Katz's work in woodcut is Moses and the Burning Bush, in his A Gift to Birobidjan collection, dated 1937. The letters are depicted in the image with Moses's first initial on top of his head, a letter on his staff, and the first letter of God in a flame.

== Later religious works ==
Katz was a strong advocate for unique, symbolic synagogue architecture. In his publications on the topic, he highlighted the lack of codified styles for synagoge architecture, and argued that the use of symbolism in image and overall design was crucial in contemporary synagogues.

As an architect, designer, and artist for synagogues in the mid-20th century, Katz's legacy is represented in part by the still-standing buildings containing his works. A prominent example of his work is at the Rego Park Jewish Center in Queens, which features a mosaic of his design on the building's façade.

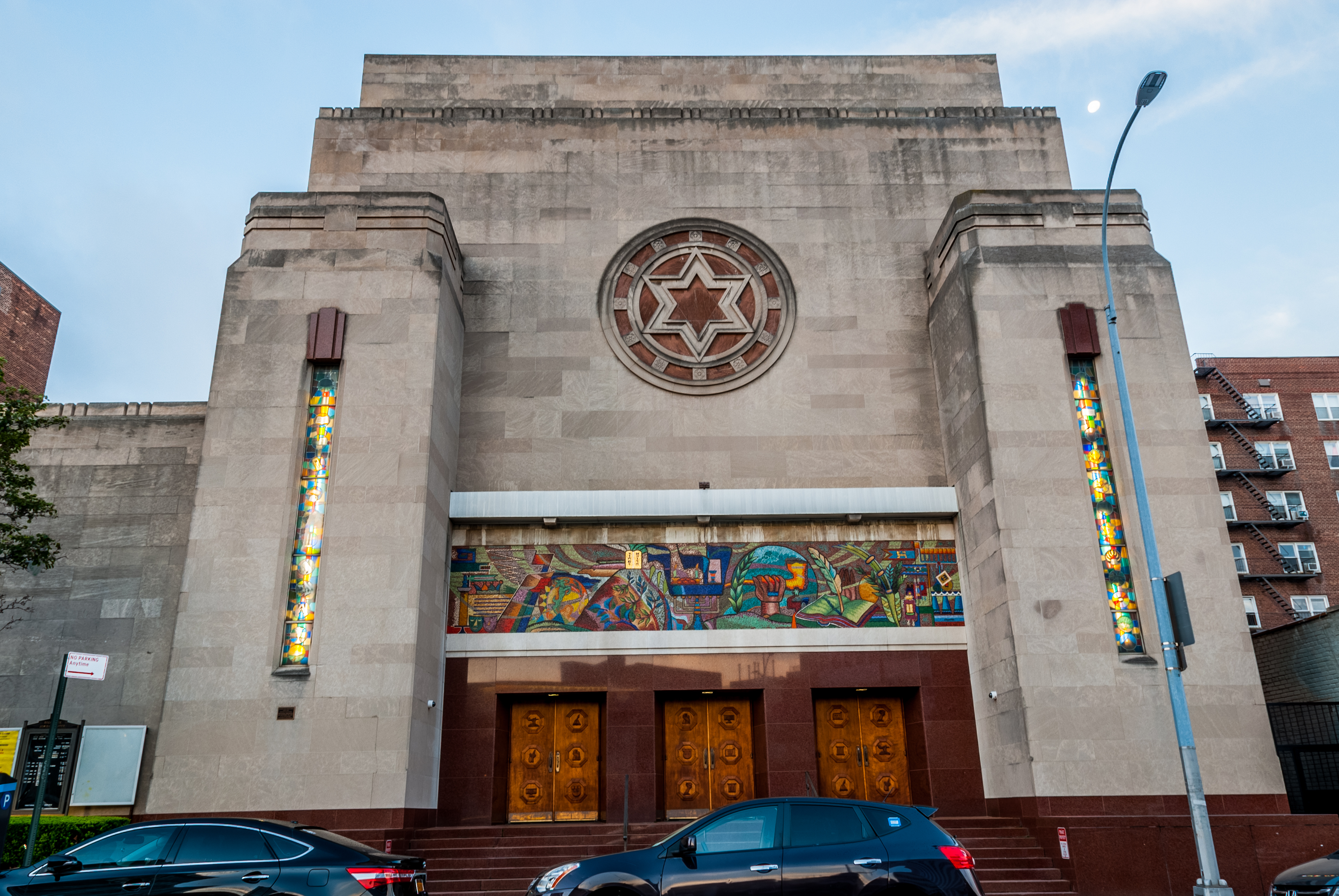
Katz's mosaic design is seen above the doors at the Rego Park Jewish Center

Katz's works are seen in over 200 synagogues across the United States.

== Death and legacy ==
A. Raymond Katz died on March 24, 1974, in Miami Beach, Florida. He was survived by his wife Elsie Engel Katz, two children, and four grandchildren. Elsie Engel Katz died in 1998.

== Selected bibliography ==
- Katz, A. Raymond; Marenof, Shlomo (1945). Prelude to a new art for an old religion. Chicago: L.M. Stein. OCLC 7984755.
- — (1946). 10 Commandments. Chicago: L.M. Stein. OCLC 81059073.
- —; Werner, Alfred (1951). Adventures in casein: paintings, 1929-1950. New York: H.F. Kraus. OCLC 1540764.
- —; Marenof, Shlomo (1952). A new art for an old religion (Revised ed.). New York: R.F. Moore. OCLC 526336.
- — (1958-03-14). "The Art Of Symbolism In The Synagogue". The National Jewish Post. 13 (29): R2.
- — (1963). The seven names. New York: A. Rothmann Fine Arts. OCLC 8605447.
- — (1964-05-15). "Architects Overlook Hebrew Symbolism". The National Jewish Post. 19 (35): 12.

== See also ==
- Todros Geller
- Jewish architecture
