= Conrad Shinn =

American Navy pilot (1922–2025)

Conrad Shinn (September 12, 1922 – May 15, 2025) was an American Navy pilot. On October 31, 1956 he became the first person to land a plane at the South Pole.
