= Andrew Jackson High School (Queens) =

Location
- 207-01 116th Avenue; Cambria Heights, Queens, New York 11411; United States; 40°41′53.9″N 73°44′46.2″W

Information
- Type: Public
- Opened: May 10, 1937
- Closed: 1994

Andrew Jackson High School is a defunct comprehensive high school in the Cambria Heights section in southeastern Queens, New York. The school was opened in 1937, and named after former United States President Andrew Jackson. However, the city closed down the school in 1994. At its nadir in the late 1970s, police broke up a heroin-processing factory in the school's basement.

Since its closure the building was renamed Campus Magnet High Schools (also known as Campus Magnet Educational Campus). It contains several different high schools centered on various professional themes: Finance and Information Technology; Humanities and the Arts; Law, Health Professions; Mathematics, Science Research and Technology. The 2010 graduation rate of the current schools approximated the graduation rate of the original school in 1992. The multi-school campus is at 207-01 116th Avenue, at Francis Lewis Boulevard and 116th Avenue.

== History ==
The design for Andrew Jackson High School was released in 1931. The plans for the school were approved by the New York City Board of Education on September 26, 1935. Ground broke on the site, at 116th Avenue and what was then Cross Island Boulevard (now Francis Lewis Boulevard), on November 18, 1935.

The school, along with Samuel J. Tilden High School, Abraham Lincoln High School, John Adams High School, Walton High School, Bayside High School, and Grover Cleveland High School were all built during the Great Depression from one set of blueprints, in order to save money. The design was based on Kirby Hall in Gretton, Northamptonshire, England. Jackson High School was built with Public Works Administration funds, as was Bayside High School. The schools were designed as small campuses to provide a "somewhat collegiate atmosphere". The design of Jackson High School and the other post-1930 schools, created by architect Walter C. Martin, was considered to be "a modern adaptation of the Adams, Lincoln, and Tilden High Schools", which had all been completed by 1929.

Jackson High School opened on May 10, 1937, with 2,500 students, at the cost of $2.5 million. It was the last of the sister schools to be completed. The school was officially dedicated on September 27, 1937, when its first full academic year began, with Mayor Fiorello H. La Guardia in attendance. Upon opening, the new school relieved the overcrowded Jamaica High School, as well as John Adams High School. The school originally served a mostly middle-class student demographic.

By 1959, the high school operated multiple academic sessions to accommodate its students. By the mid-1960s, the school had transitioned from a predominantly White student body, to an enrollment that was nearly 50 percent Black, disproportionate to the student body of the rest of the borough. The changes coincided with an influx of African Americans and Afro-Caribbeans to the area, along with white flight. Around this time, the State Education Commissioner and the Board of Education began efforts to prevent "de facto" segregation in the school and the entire Queens borough; these efforts would involve transferring students to schools outside of their local district. In September 1965, the New York City Transit Authority created the Q77 bus route along Francis Lewis Boulevard, in order to better transport students from other districts to the high school. In May 1967, Schools Superintendent Bernard E. Donovan announced plans to transfer 260 active and prospective students from Jamaica High School and Martin Van Buren High School in Queens Village to Jackson High School, which led to protest from parents in those communities. The plan was rescinded by September of that year. In 1968, Donovan proposed rezoning the entire Queens borough, requiring students to be bused to more distant high schools, which led to similar protests. The situation was compounded by the New York City teachers' strike of 1968. The situation and ensuing civil unrest between the students led to increased police presence at the school, and a walkout on May 19, 1969. Rezoning and busing efforts continued into the 1970s, by which time the high school was predominantly Black and Puerto Rican. This included the establishment of gifted programs aimed at attracting students from other areas of Queens, including an offsite specialized school in Corona, Queens. .

In 1977, the NAACP sued the Board of Education in Federal District Court for the lack of integration in the school, accusing the Board of intentionally segregating the school "to keep other schools predominantly white." On May 16, 1978, Judge John Francis Dooling Jr. ordered the Board of Education to create a plan to integrate the school within 45 days of the ruling, to be implemented for the 1978–1979 academic year; this deadline was suspended in June of that year. The United States Court of Appeals for the Second Circuit overturned this decision in April 1979.

Around this time, the school gained a reputation for poor academic performance, high truancy and dropout rates, and low graduation rates, which continued into the 1980s and 1990s. Some also accused the city of using the high school as a "dumping ground for the borough's most unwanted minority students." In 1986, Jackson High School was among the five worst city schools in terms of dropout rates and reading proficiency. By 1990, the school was among 14 city high schools that received bi-weekly metal detector screenings due to increasing violence. In 1993, the city planned to create a small high school provisionally called "Andrew Jackson High School Magnet School" within the building by fall of that year, but the opening was pushed back. In November 1993, Schools Chancellor Ramon C. Cortines began drafting new plans to close and reorganize Andrew Jackson High School, as well as James Monroe High School in the Bronx On November 17, 1993, the Board of Education unanimously voted to close the high school and replace it with four smaller "magnet" or "thematic schools". Jackson HS and Monroe were among the first former large high schools in New York City to be reopened as an "educational campus." The school closed in spring 1994, and was reopened during the fall semester as "Campus Magnet High Schools" with new freshman students in four new schools, each occupying a single floor of the facility. At the time of its closure, Jackson was among 10 city schools with the most "violent or illegal incidents". Half of the Jackson High School teachers were retained for the new schools. The building continued to employ metal detectors following its conversion into a campus; other high schools-turned-campuses had ceased screenings as part of their transition.

== Campus Magnet schools ==
Current schools include:

- Benjamin Franklin High School for Finance & Information Technology
- Health, Arts, Robotics, and Technology High School
- Institute for Health Professions at Cambria Heights
- Mathematics, Science Research and Technology Magnet High School

Former schools included:

- Business, Computer Applications & Entrepreneurship High School
- Law, Government and Community Service High School

== Notable alumni ==
- 50 Cent (born 1975; did not graduate), rapper
- Cindy Adams (born 1930), gossip columnist and writer
- Joel Benenson (born 1952), pollster and consultant known for his role as a strategist for Barack Obama's 2008 and 2012 presidential campaigns
- Kurt Boone (born 1959), author known for his work documenting street culture, which includes graffiti, urban cycling, street photography, skateboarding, busking, and spoken word
- Bob Cousy (born 1928), professional basketball player
- Lloyd Daniels (born 1967), professional basketball player
- Paul Evans (born 1938), singer, songwriter and recording artist most prominent in the 50s and 60s
- Bob Gale (1925–1975), All-American college basketball player
- Linda R. Greenstein (born 1950), politician who represents the 14th legislative district in the New Jersey Senate
- Karl Grossman, professor of journalism at the State University of New York at Old Westbury
- Lani Guinier (1950-2021), civil rights scholar
- Verna Hart (1961-2019), African-American artist known for her expressionist painting focused on jazz music
- Boo Harvey (born 1966), basketball player
- Jam Master Jay (1965-2002), musician, DJ, turntablist
- LL Cool J (born 1968; did not graduate), rapper and actor
- Gladys Brown Keating (1923-2014), politician and civic activist
- Bill Kotsores (1924-1971), basketball player best known for his collegiate career at St. John's University in the 1940s.
- Robert Levin, American classical pianist, musicologist and composer.
- Vincent Matthews (born 1947), sprinter, winner of two Olympic gold medals, at the 1968 Summer Olympics and 1972 Summer Olympics.
- Joe Morton (born 1947), actor
- Kyle O'Quinn (born 1990), professional basketball player for the New York Knicks
- Jordan Parks (born 1994), professional basketball player
- William Scarborough (born c. 1945), who represented District 29 in the New York State Assembly.
- The Shangri-Las, musicians
- Larry Smith (1952-2014), pioneering African-American musician and hip hop record producer.
- Bo Snerdley (born 1955), radio host, radio producer and call screener.
- Lorenzo Thomas (1944-2005), poet and critic.
