= Springfield Park =

Springfield Park may refer to:

- Springfield Park (Jacksonville), a public park in Jacksonville, Florida
- Springfield Park, Liverpool, a public park in Liverpool, England
- Springfield Park (London), a park in Upper Clapton, London
- Springfield Park (Durban), an industrial suburb of Durban, South Africa
- Springfield Park, Quebec, a neighbourhood in Longueuil, Quebec, Canada
- Springfield Park (Queens), a city park in Queens, of New York City
- Springfield Park (Rochdale), a public park in Rochdale, England
- Springfield Park (Wigan), a former multi-use stadium in Wigan, England
