= Cambria Heights Academy =

Public school in New York City

Cambria Heights Academy for New Literacies

Location
- 188-04 91st Avenue, Cambria Heights, Queens, New York 11423
- Coordinates: 40.7116°N 73.7710°W

Information
- School type: Public
- School district: New York City Department of Education
- School number: Q326
- Principal: Melissa Menake
- Grades: 9–12
- Enrollment: 370 _{(2018–2019)}
- Website: www.nycacademy.org

Cambria Heights Academy or Cambria Heights Academy for New Literacies or Q326 is a secondary school in Queens, New York City, United States, serving grades 9 through 12. It is in New York City Schools Geographic District 29.

Cambria Heights Academy is named after the area of Queens that it serves, Cambria Heights.

== Statistics ==
The school has a student population of 370. Of those, 55% are male and 45% are female. The ethnic makeup of the school is 10% Hispanic or Latino, 15% Asian, 72% African-American, and 2% White.

== History ==
The school opened in 2010 under the current principal, Melissa Menake. The school's dress code is "solid-colored, collared shirt; black, blue or khaki dress pants/skirt; black or brown belt; solid black shoes/sneakers."
