= Verna Hart =

African-American artist (1961–2019)

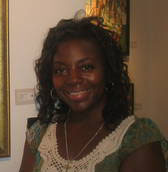
- Born: January 28, 1961; New York City, New York
- Died: April 26, 2019 (aged 58); Wilmington, Delaware
- Known for: Painting

Verna Hart (January 28, 1961 – April 26, 2019) was an African-American artist known for her expressionist painting focused on jazz music. She was born and raised in the Harlem neighborhood of New York City.

== Early life ==
Hart was born in Harlem to Earl Alphonso Hart, a detective sergeant in the New York City Police, and Pauline (Shomo) Hart. They moved to Middle Village, Queens when she was four.

While studying at Andrew Jackson High School in Cambria Heights, Queens, she took painting classes at Cooper Union. She continued her education at the School of Visual Arts with a bachelor of fine arts degree in painting, a master's of fine arts in painting from Pratt Institute and a master's in education supervision and administration from the Bank Street College of Education, both in 1991.

== Career ==
Hart was an art teacher at Springfield Gardens High School in Queens and at Medgar Evers College of the City University of New York in Brooklyn.

Hart's work has been featured at United States embassies in Africa and other United States Department of State offices.

In 1999 Jammin' Under the El was commissioned by the New York City Metropolitan Transportation Authority (MTA). The installation is a prominent feature at the Myrtle Avenue station (BMT Jamaica Line) in Brooklyn. It consists of stained glass windows on the platforms' sign structures as well as the station house depicting various scenes related to music.

Hart's work was shown throughout the 1980's and 1990's at James Powers (gallerist) gallery Spiral, a space in Prospect Heights, Brooklyn that focused on the work of Black artists. Hart was also exhibited at Dorsey's Fine Art Gallery.

== Death ==
Hart moved to Wilmington, Delaware almost 20 years before her death so she could get medical treatment for one of her children. She died at her home there. According to her son ago Romare, she had a seizure while she slept.

== Exhibitions ==
Seeing Jazz: A Tribute to the Masters and Pittsburgh Jazz Legends, Manchester Craftsmen's Guild, Pittsburgh PA (January 26-April 3, 2009): Group exhibition. Included: O'Neal Abel, Benny Andrews, Romare Bearden, Sharif Bey, Betty Blayton Taylor, Tina Williams Brewer, Fred Brown, Bisa Butler, Lauren Camp, Nora Mae Carmichael, Sadikisha Collier, Robert Daniels, Tafa Fiadzigbe, Frank Frazier, Eric Girault, Verna Hart, Rene Hinds, Jamillah Jennings, MLJ Johnson, Larry Joseph, Charlotte Ka, Eli Kince, Dindga McCannon, Evangeline J. Montgomery, Richard Mayhew, Steve Mayo, Omowale Morgan, Otto Neals, Ademola Olugebefola, Eric Pryor, Faith Ringgold, Senghor Reid, Maurice D. Robertson, Ernani Silva, Danny Simmons, Alexandria Smith, George Smith, Chuck Stewart, Allen Stringfellow, Ann Tanksley, Habib Tiwoni, Osman Tyner, Manny Vega, Richard Waters, Douglas J. Webster, Emmett Wigglesworth, and Shirley Woodson.

== Popular culture ==
Hart's artwork has appeared in films, television shows, and on record covers, including Spike Lee's 1990 film Mo' Better Blues, and Branford Marsalis' 1992 album I Heard You Twice the First Time.
