= Queens Community Board 13 =

Queens Community District 13
- Community District
- Country: United States
- State: New York
- City: New York City
- Borough: Queens
- Neighborhoods: list: Bellerose; Brookville; Cambria Heights; Glen Oaks; Laurelton; Meadowmere; Queens Village; Rosedale

Government
  - Chair: Bryan Block
  - District Manager: Mark McMillan

Area
  - Total: 12.6 sq mi (33 km^{2})

Population (2016)
  - Total: 200,852
  - Density: 15,900/sq mi (6,150/km^{2})

Ethnicity
  - African-American: 55.1%
  - Asian: 10.2%
  - Hispanic and Latino Americans: 10.4%
  - White: 18.4%
  - Others: %
- Time zone: UTC−5 (Eastern)
  - Summer (DST): UTC−4 (EDT)
- Area code: 718, 347, 929, and 917
- Police Precinct: 105th (website)
- Website: www1.nyc.gov/site/queenscb13/index.page

The Queens Community Board 13 is a local government in the New York City borough of Queens, encompassing the neighborhoods of Queens Village, Glen Oaks, Bellerose, Cambria Heights, Laurelton, Rosedale, Meadowmere, Floral Park and Brookville. It is bounded to the north by the Grand Central Parkway, to the east by the Nassau County border, to the south by Nassau County and John F. Kennedy International Airport and to the west by Francis Lewis Boulevard. The area has a population of 196,284, which is made up of roughly 60% Black, 10% Caucasian, 12% Asian and 12% Hispanic residents.

== Demographics ==
The resident population is 18.4% White, 55.1% Black, 10.4% Hispanic or Latino, 10.2% Asian, 0.3% Native American/Pacific Islander, and 4.1% of two or more races. There were 75,580 foreign-born citizens living in the 13th district. Out of that number, 22.9% or 17,276 were born in Jamaica, 16.8% or 12,677 were born in Haiti, 10.7% or 8,121 were born in Guyana, 9.4% or 7,080 were born in India, 5.7% or 4,327 were born in Trinidad and Tobago, 3.1% or 2,329 were born in the Philippines, 2.5% or 1,883 were born in Colombia, 1,477 or 2.0% were born in Barbados, 1,467 or 1.9% were born in the Dominican Republic, 1,154 or 1.5 were born in Panama, and 23.5% or 17,789 were born in other countries.

== Geography ==
The district covers approximately 12.6 square miles (33 km^{2}).
