= Potamogeton Pond =

Pond in New York City, United States

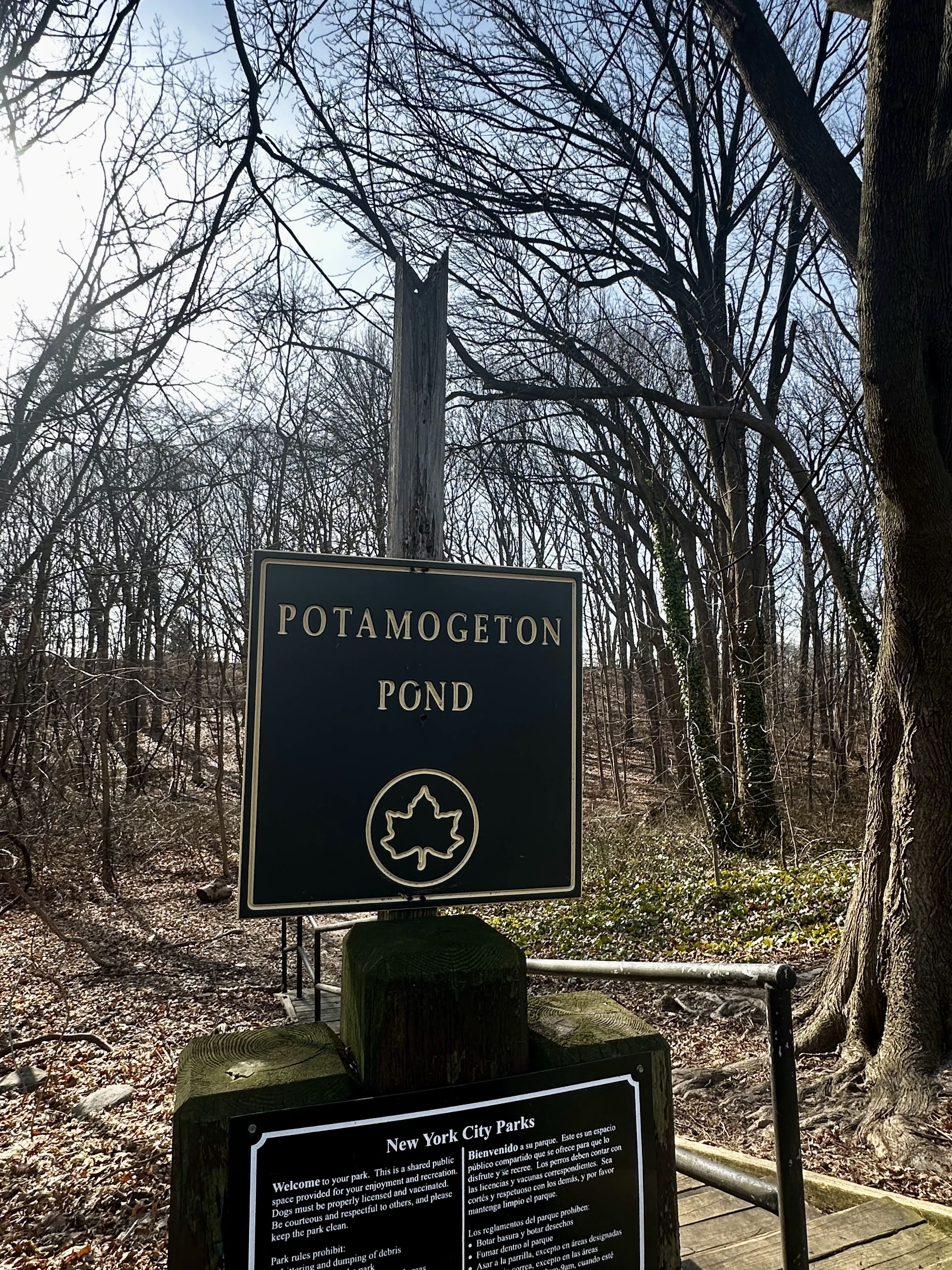

- Location within New York
- Location: Queens, New York City, New York
- Coordinates: 40°43′47″N 73°45′03″W
- Type: pond

Potamogeton Pond, a small pond in Queens, New York City (historically also known as Pea Pond), is located on a narrow strip of parkland in Hollis Hills alongside Grand Central Parkway and named after an aquatic plant. It was once a stop on a bridle trail that connected Cunningham Park to Alley Pond Park; but when local stables closed, the trail became disused. The pond can be found at 86th Avenue and 217th Street. The completion of Grand Central Parkway reduced the amount of water that fed the pond, resulting in less water intake and converting the once popular ice-skating site to a bog. The perch, carp, and catfish that lived in the pond died off in 1963 as the parkway was widened in conjunction with the world's fair taking place in Flushing Meadows the following year. Silt covered up the pond, and plants grew atop its former surface.

Public awareness of the pond can be credited to the public-school science teacher Thomas F. Schweitzer and the Queens College ecology professor Andrew C. Greller, who led tours of the pond site and founded organizations that advocated for its restoration. Schweitzer's Hollis Hills Civic Association teamed up with Greller's Queens College Ecology Club to lobby the city, which by 1970 determined that "the area known as Pea Pond ... no longer receives sufficient water to maintain a pond". Undeterred, advocates for the pond enlisted the support of the Boy Scouts, the Queens Village Centennial Association, and local high school nature clubs. Under the banner of the East Queens Ad Hoc Committee for a Natural Attitude Toward Urban Recreational Environment (NATURE), supporters succeeded in blocking the state and city's plans to cover the pond's site.

The pond is presently overgrown with Phragmites and cattails. It fills up completely only after heavy rains. Entrances to the Potamogeton Pond Trail can be found on Grand Central Parkway at 217th Street and at 82nd Avenue.
