= Kurt Boone =

American writer

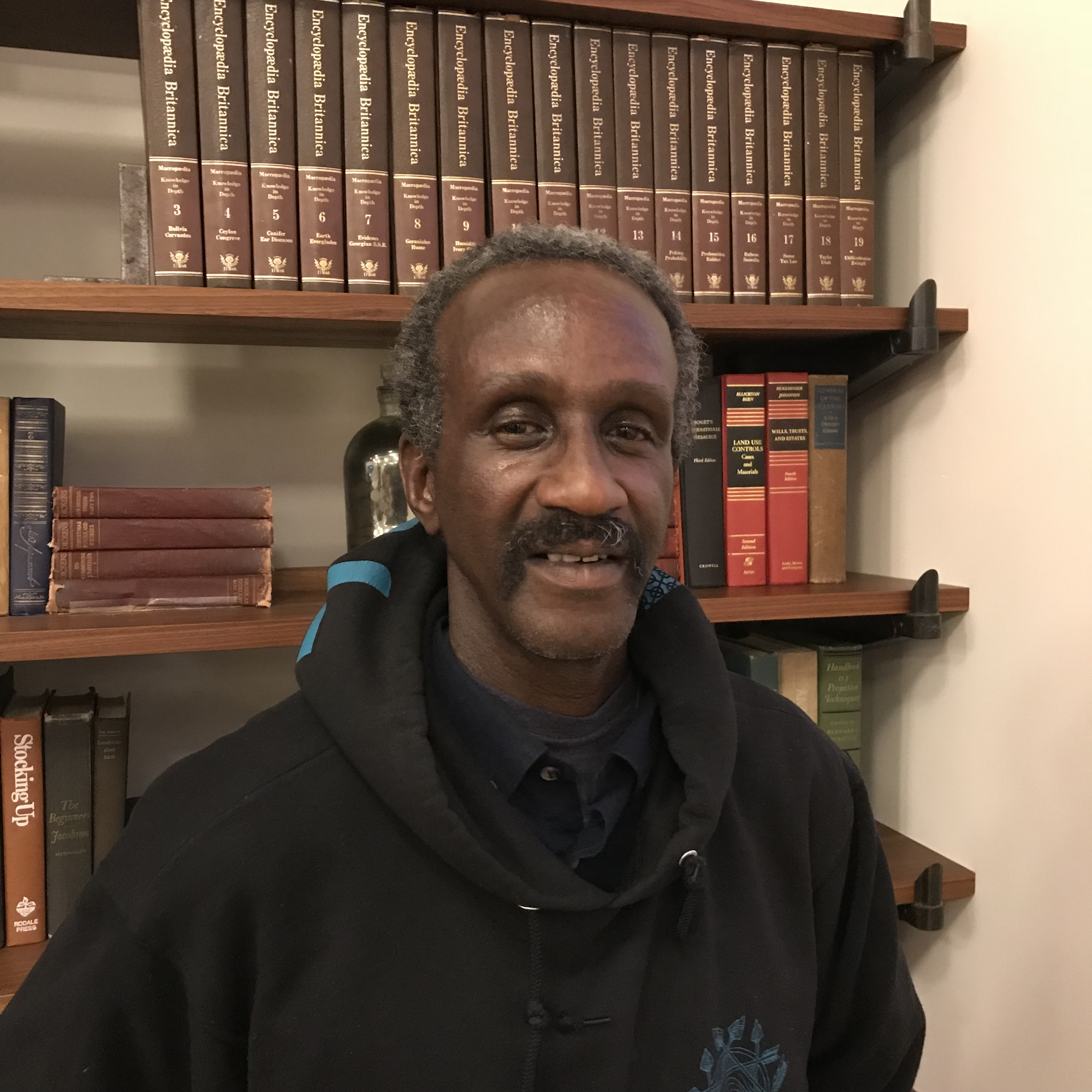
- Born: September 24, 1959 (age 67); Bedford–Stuyvesant, Brooklyn, New York, US
- Other names: Kurt B Boone; Messenger 841
- Occupation: Author
- Years active: 1990-present
- Website: KurtBooneBooks.com

Kurt Boone (born September 24, 1959) is a New York City-based author known for his work documenting street culture, which includes graffiti, urban cycling, street photography, skateboarding, busking, and spoken word.

== Early life ==
Boone was born in the Bedford–Stuyvesant neighborhood of Brooklyn to Elliott W. Boone Sr., a United States Postal Service employee, and Thelma Boone (née Strothers).

Boone graduated from Andrew Jackson High School in the Cambria Heights neighborhood of Queens in New York City. In high school, Boone was on the track team and basketball team.

Boone attended LaGuardia Community College. He graduated from Los Angeles City College with a degree in business administration.

== Career ==
Boone started writing poetry in his first year at LaGuardia Community College. He worked as a sports reporter for York College's Pandora Box and Los Angeles City College's Los Angeles Collegian newspapers.

The first book he ever wrote was for the Yale Series of Younger Poet Contest. He did not win but the contest inspired him to write more books.

In 1990, Boone began working as a New York City foot messenger for Rapid Messenger Service. Working as a messenger, delivering and picking up packages either by foot or by bike, was a common occupation for many former high school track stars at that time. Boone is classified as a "metro" messenger, which means he delivers and picks up packages by foot using the New York City Metropolitan Transportation Authority (MTA) service. Metro is short for MTA. Boone became known for being one of the fastest foot messengers in New York City.

While working as a foot messenger and riding the subway on the jobs that are typically less than an hour, Boone writes poetry that is influenced by his travels and encounters with people.

Boone started to become known as a fast courier and talented poet, performing poetry at many New York City events. That eventually led him to produce his first book of poems, Looking For Myself, which was published in 1996. By that time he had left Rapid Messenger Service in 1994.

In addition in the 1990s he was a sales representative for the Quarterly Black Review of Books and later a marketing representative for the Harlem Book Fair, a division of QBR. In 2000, he again went back into messenger work, but this time he would document his experiences in books and videos.

Since 2000 in his 12 years as a messenger, he has been reported upon in the media and made the cover of Courier Magazine, with the front headline: "Nobody knows The Gritty Streets of NYC better than Kurt Boone."

Feature stories about Boone have been published in The New York Times, New York Daily News, New York Post and Metro New York. Boone's writing work has also led to opportunities in film and video. He appears in Verse: A Murder Mystery (2011), Career Courier: The Labor Of Love (2011) and produced The Messenger Poet Show (2011), a web television series.

In total, Boone worked at Rapid Messenger Service, Excel Messenger Service, Kangaroo Courier and Mobile Messenger Service – all based in New York City.

Boone's four books of poetry are a loose collection that he calls his messenger poetry series, which documents stories about messengers in verse form, in poetry.

Boone's 2016 book, Subway Beats: Celebrating New York City Buskers, features over 250 musicians in approximately 30 subway stations. It took him over three years to compile and complete the book, which he documented on an online blog.

Boone appeared in Spike Lee's 1992 film, Malcolm X.

Boone cites the author Frank McCourt and playwright Langston Hughes as influences on his work.

== Personal life ==
Boone lives in the Cambria Heights neighborhood of Queens in New York City.

Boone is known by his foot messenger dispatch name, Messenger 841. It is also the name of an eponymous line of clothing and messenger bags, as well as a consulting company for marketing and film production.

== Filmography ==
- 1992: Malcolm X
- 2011: Career Courier: The Labor of Love (documentary)
- 2011: VERSE, a Murder Mystery (TV show)

== Works and publications ==
Books

- Bolger, Amy (photography by); Boone, Kurt B. (book coordinator); Bolger, Kevin (epilogue); Ugalde, Greg (illustrations by); Gore, Jr., Robert (photo editor) (2006). New York Alleycats. Minneapolis, MN: Tasora. ISBN 978-0-978-99461-7. OCLC 154689222.
- Boone, Kurt; Sarsgard, John (photography by); Gore Jr., Robert (edited by) (2007). Inside Grand Central Terminal: A Photo Essay. Minneapolis, MN: Tasora. ISBN 978-0-978-99460-0. OCLC 166389873.
- Mallory, Noreen; Boone, Kurt; Wilson, Stephanie (perspective by) (2007). Urban Theory: Critical Thoughts in America. New York, NY: Harlem Book Fair Publishing. ISBN 978-1-6048-1214-5. OCLC 472577274.
- Boone, Kurt; Ugalde, Greg (illustrations by) (2009). Messenger Poet. Minneapolis, MN: Tasora. ISBN 978-1-934-69023-9. OCLC 700052589.
- Boone, Kurt B. (2011). Asphalt Warrior: The Story of New York City's Fastest Messenger. Minneapolis, MN: Tasora Books. ISBN 978-1-934-69029-1. OCLC 733969872.
- Boone, Kurt B. (2016). Subway Beats: Celebrating New York City Buskers. Atglen, PA: Schiffer Publishing, Ltd. ISBN 978-0-764-35182-2. OCLC 946462859.

Poetry

- Boone, Kurt B.; Mallory, Noreen (introduction by) (1996). Looking for Myself: Poetry. Pittsburgh, PA: Dorrance Publishing. ISBN 978-0-805-93570-7. OCLC 39325532.
- Boone, Kurt; Hill, Jeff (illustrations by); Ugalde, Greg (illustrations by) (2008). On the Subway: Poetry. Minneapolis, MN: Tasora Books. ISBN 978-1-934-69000-0. OCLC 779980923.
- Boone, Kurt; Cornell University Library Hip-Hop Collection (2012). Bard of New York. New York, NY: Kurt Boone Books. ISBN 978-1-481-96535-4. OCLC 844171122.
- Boone, Kurt (2015). The Skyscraper Shuffle. New York, NY: Kurt Boone Books. ISBN 978-1-934-69079-6. OCLC 905978662.

Articles

- Boone, Kurt (September 2012). "Lucas Brunelle" (PDF). Urban Velo. No. 33. pp. 32–36.
- Boone, Kurt (November 2012). "Jason Clary" (PDF). Urban Velo. No. 34. pp. 21–22.
