= Fred Cambria =

American baseball player (born 1948)

- Pitcher
- Born: January 22, 1948 (age 78); Cambria Heights, Queens, New York, U.S.
- Batted: Right Threw: Right

MLB debut
- August 26, 1970, for the Pittsburgh Pirates

Last MLB appearance
- October 1, 1970, for the Pittsburgh Pirates

MLB statistics
- Win–loss record: 1–2
- Earned run average: 3.51
- Strikeouts: 14
- Stats at Baseball Reference

Teams
- Pittsburgh Pirates (1970)

Frederick Dennis Cambria (born January 22, 1948) is a former baseball player, a right-handed pitcher who appeared in 6 games — five as a starting pitcher — for the 1970 Pittsburgh Pirates. He stood 6 feet 2 inches (1.88 m) tall, weighed 195 pounds (88 kg) and attended St. Leo University.

He was born in Cambria Heights, Queens, New York, and graduated from St. Pascal's High School in neighboring St. Alban's. Chosen by Pittsburgh in the third round of the 1969 Major League Baseball draft, Cambria was initially assigned to the Double-A York Pirates, where he won nine of 11 decisions with a low 2.16 earned run average. In his 14 appearances, he threw three shutouts. The following season he won 12 of 19 decisions for the Triple-A Columbus Jets before his recall to Pittsburgh in August 1970.

On Wednesday, August 26, he made his Major League debut as a starting pitcher against the Padres at San Diego Stadium. The first-place Pirates were embroiled in a three-team race with the Chicago Cubs and Cambria's boyhood team, the New York Mets, for the National League East Division championship. But Cambria responded, pitching six scoreless innings before allowing two runs, only one earned, on a home run by San Diego's Ed Spiezio in the seventh frame. The runs were decisive, as the Pirates lost the contest, 2–1. He followed his debut effort with seven innings of one-run baseball against the San Francisco Giants, although he did not earn a decision in that game. His lone Major League win followed six days later, as he defeated the Philadelphia Phillies 7–4 at Three Rivers Stadium, although he allowed ten hits and four earned runs in his 7 1/3 innings pitched that day.

A rough outing against the St. Louis Cardinals followed on September 9, pinning Cambria with his second career defeat. But eleven days later, Cambria faced his hometown Mets in his home borough, as the starting pitcher in the second game of a doubleheader at Shea Stadium. The Mets had won the opening game to climb within 2 1/2 games of the first-place Pirates, and Cambria drew reigning Cy Young Award winning pitcher Tom Seaver as his opponent in the nightcap. But Cambria outpitched Seaver, allowing only two earned runs in 5 1/3 innings. He left the game with his team ahead 5–3, and although the Pirate bullpen allowed the Mets to tie the score at five in the seventh inning, denying Cambria the win, Pittsburgh came back to win 9–5. They eventually won the division title by five games over the second-place Cubs. Cambria did not appear in the 1970 NLCS, which the Pirates dropped in three straight games to the Cincinnati Reds.

The 1970 campaign proved to be Cambria's one trial in Major League Baseball. An arm injury forced him to alter his delivery and he left baseball after the 1973 minor league season. He graduated from St. Leo's, and later became its baseball coach and also was a minor league instructor in the Padres' organization. He also served as commissioner of the Atlantic Collegiate Baseball League.

Cambria was inducted into the Suffolk Sports Hall of Fame on Long Island in the Baseball Category with the Class of 2014.
