= Rosedale, Queens =

Neighborhood in New York City

Rosedale
- Neighborhood of Queens
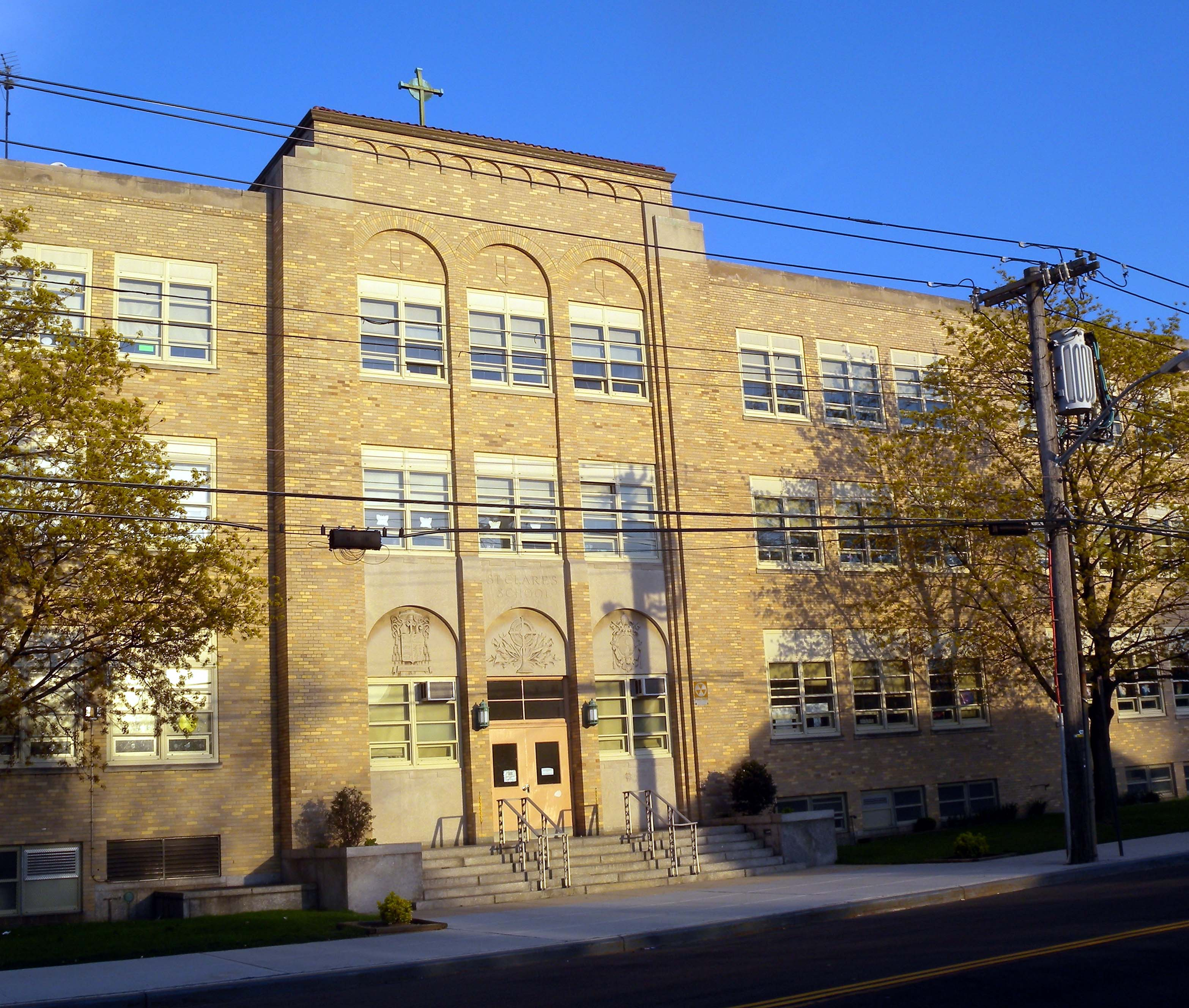
- St. Clare Catholic Academy
- Location within New York City
- Coordinates: 40.656°N 73.74°W
- Country: United States
- State: New York
- City: New York City
- County/Borough: Queens
- Community District: Queens 13

Population (2010)
  - Total: 25,063

Ethnicity
  - Black: 79.9%
  - Hispanic: 9.3%
  - White: 5.3%
  - Asian: 2.2%
  - Other: 3.5%

Economics
  - Median income: $58,396
- Time zone: UTC−5 (EST)
  - Summer (DST): UTC−4 (EDT)
- ZIP Code: 11422
- Area codes: 718, 347, 929, and 917
- Website: www.rosedale.nyc

Rosedale is a neighborhood in New York City in the southeastern portion of the borough of Queens. The neighborhood, located along the southern part of Queens, borders Nassau County.

Rosedale is located in Queens Community District 13 and its ZIP Code is 11422. It is patrolled by the New York City Police Department's 116th Precinct.

== History ==
Rosedale was originally conceived in the consolidation of the borough of Queens as a part of what is now Springfield Gardens. At the time, the Laurelton Land Company was in charge of the new Borough of Queens. It was dotted with farmland that was isolated from each other, so construction on an acceptable mode of transportation was started immediately. The Southern Railroad of Long Island (now Long Island Rail Road) was built and the whole area (today Laurelton, Rosedale, and Springfield Gardens) was served by the Laurelton station. The area was also connected to the Brooklyn waterworks. In the 20th century, the water system was less needed, and its use dwindled. Today the ruins of the aqueduct system can still be seen. After the Long Island Rail Road's construction, many new roads such as Francis Lewis and Sunrise Boulevard (today Sunrise Highway) were constructed. The area that is now Rosedale remained farmland until the mid-1930s. After the former period of relatively slow growth, development rapidly turned Rosedale into a suburban community. Rosedale was originally known as Foster's Meadow.

During the mid-1970s, African American and Caribbean families started moving into what had been a mostly Irish, Italian, and Jewish community. Many black families' homes were firebombed to harass them and cajole them to leave. The U.S. government filed a civil-rights lawsuit in 1975 against a group named Return Our American Rights (ROAR), alleging that ROAR had been harassing white homeowners who tried to sell to black clients, and implicating ROAR in some of the firebombings. In 1976, Bill Moyers presented a documentary titled Rosedale: The Way It Is, which addressed the racial tensions in the community. While the racial tensions decreased in subsequent years, there were still some incidents of racial conflict: for instance, during the July 4 weekend in 1989, a group of white youths chased black youths through Rosedale after a dispute over firecrackers.

In the end, the area ended up being mostly a home to many Caribbean immigrants. Irish, Italian, and Jewish Americans moved to the neighboring Nassau County communities of Valley Stream, South Valley Stream, and Woodmere.

== Location ==
Rosedale is bordered to the north by Cambria Heights, to the east by Valley Stream and North Woodmere (both in Nassau County), to the west by Laurelton, Springfield Gardens, and John F. Kennedy International Airport, and to the south by Inwood and Lawrence in Nassau County. It is at the eastern edge of New York City, at its border with Valley Stream forming part of the boundary between Queens and Nassau County. The neighborhood is part of Queens Community Board 13. Many roads of importance in Queens also run through Rosedale such as Francis Lewis Boulevard, Conduit Avenue, Cross Island Parkway, and the Belt Parkway, as well as Rockaway Boulevard, Sunrise Highway, and Merrick Boulevard which connect Queens and Nassau Counties.

=== Warnerville and Meadowmere ===
Warnerville and Meadowmere are small neighborhoods within Rosedale. The area is served by the 11422 ZIP Code, which also covers the rest of Rosedale and parts of Kennedy Airport. Warnerville is surrounded on three sides by Jamaica Bay just to the southeast of John F. Kennedy International Airport and comprises just three streets, bordered by Rockaway Boulevard on the east. Meadowmere is surrounded by Nassau County and comprises just four streets and six blocks, bordered on the west by Hook Creek and on the east by Rockaway Boulevard.

== Demographics ==
Based on data from the 2010 United States census, the population of Rosedale was 25,063, a decrease of 439 (1.7%) from the 25,502 counted in 2000. Covering an area of 1,354.44 acres (548.12 ha), the neighborhood had a population density of 18.5 inhabitants per acre (11,800/sq mi; 4,600/km^{2}).

The racial makeup of the neighborhood was 5.3% (1,334) White, 79.9% (20,033) African American, 0.3% (82) Native American, 2.2% (556) Asian, 1.0% (242) from other races, and 1.9% (474) from two or more races. Hispanic or Latino of any race were 9.3% (2,342) of the population.

== Recreation ==
The 90-acre (36 ha) Brookville Park is located on the western border of Rosedale (next to Springfield Gardens). It is bounded by South Conduit Avenue, 149th Avenue, and 232nd and 235th Streets. It contains Conselyea's Pond.

== Education ==
=== Public schools ===
Rosedale's public schools are operated by the New York City Department of Education.

Public elementary and intermediate (Junior High) schools in Rosedale include:

- P.S. 38/Rosedale School
- P.S. 138/The Sunrise School
- P.S. 195/The William Haberle School
- P.S./I.S. 270/The Gordon Parks School

=== Private schools ===
Private preschool, elementary and intermediate (Junior High) schools in Rosedale include:

- Christ Lutheran, a Lutheran school for K–8th Grade
- Little Leadership Academy, a Christian preschool for ages 2 – 5.
- St. Clare Catholic Academy

== Transportation ==
Rosedale is a station on the Long Island Rail Road's Atlantic Branch, located at North Conduit Avenue and 243rd Street. Service is provided by both the Far Rockaway and Long Beach branches. Rosedale is also served by the Q5, Q85, Q86, Q87, Q89 and Q111 bus routes. There is also an express bus route, the QM63, which operates during rush hours only.

== Popular Culture ==
Rosedale: The Way It Is by Bill Moyers was a documentary.

== Notable residents ==
Notable current and former residents of Rosedale include:

- Barbara Bach (born 1947), actress
- Phil Carey (1925–2009), soap opera actor
- Kadeem Dacres (born 1991), soccer player who currently plays as a winger
- John DeBella (born 1951), radio personality
- Ken Eurell (born 1960), plays himself in the documentary The Seven Five
- Alicia Hyndman (born 1971), politician who represents the 29th District of the New York State Assembly
- Charles Jenkins (born 1989), basketball player
- Carole King (born 1942), singer, songwriter, and pianist
- Victor LaValle (born 1972), author<ref."Victor LaValle On Mental Illness, Monsters, Survival", Fresh Air, August 29, 2012. Accessed December 31, 2023. "Lavalle: We moved to another part of Queens when I was 13, and it was an all-black neighborhood. It was called, it was Rosedale, Queens and it was all black."</ref>
- Florence V. Lucas (1915–1987), lawyer who was president of the Jamaica branch of the NAACP.
- Dean Marlowe (born 1992), NFL Professional Athlete
- Paul C. McKasty (1964–1989), engineer, mixer, and producer
- Darren Robinson (1967–1995), rapper of The Fat Boys
- Herb Score (1933–2008), baseball player/announcer, born in Rosedale
- DJ Spinbad (1974–2020), DJ/Producer
- John Turturro (born 1957), actor, director
- Nicholas Turturro (born 1962), actor
- Harvey Wang (born 1956), photographer
