= Springfield Park (Queens) =

Public park in Queens, New York

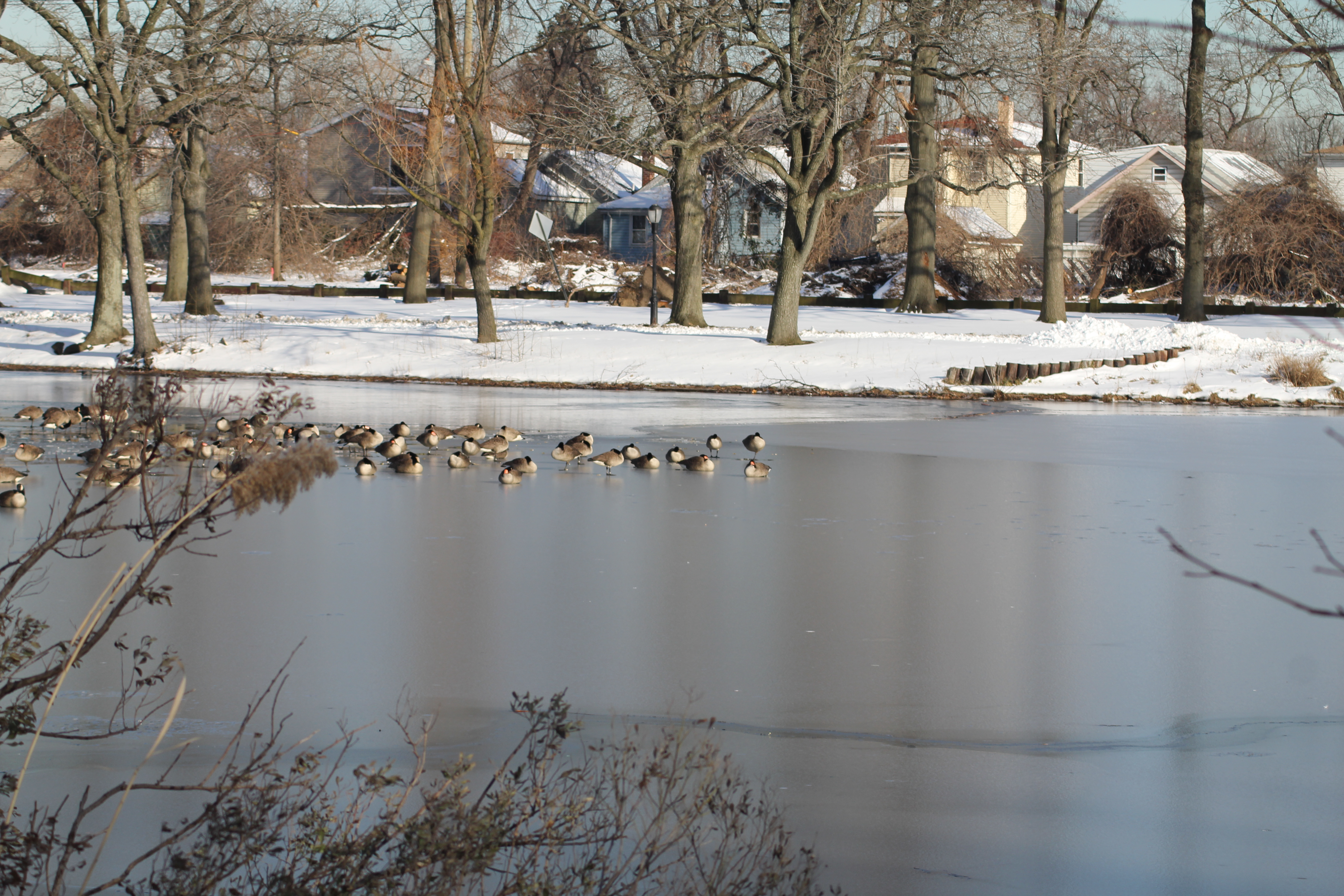
- A part of Springfield Lake in Springfield Park
- Interactive map of Springfield Park
- Type: Public park
- Location: Queens, NY, United States
- Coordinates: 40°39′42″N 73°45′41″W
- Area: 23.54 acres (9.53 ha)
- Created: 1932
- Operator: New York City Department of Parks & Recreation
- Status: Open all year

Springfield Park is a public park in Springfield Gardens, in southeast Queens, New York City. It consists of 23.54 acres (9.53 ha), including the sizable Springfield Lake at its center. It is located on the west side of Springfield Boulevard between 145th Road and 147th Avenue, less than a mile north of JFK Airport. It is maintained by the New York City Department of Parks and Recreation.

== History ==
Springfield Park is located in a low-lying area that once had many springs, which is why 17th century settlers named the area Spring Field. Those settlers built a pond for irrigation purposes in the area that later became the park. As early as 1750 a grist mill operated at the south end of the pond, which was connected to the water supply system of the City of Brooklyn in 1854. In 1932 a nearby sewer construction project destroyed the pond, which had already become polluted and was no longer used for water supply. The city then filled in the area for use as a park. In 1964 the city assigned control of all former water supply areas, including Springfield Park, to the Parks Department.

A proposal in the 1970s by the city to convert the park into an industrial facility was successfully opposed by community activists led by New York State Assembly member Guy Brewer. The area remained a park, though it became rundown. In 1999 the rehabilitation of the park began with the reconstruction of a playground. As of 2013, the park, according to the Parks Department website, "contains two full-size basketball courts, two baseball diamonds, two tennis courts, swings, a spray shower, play equipment with safety surfacing, benches, a flagpole with a yardarm, and a central pond with two bridges."

In October 2012 the city started the construction of a $69 million project to improve drainage of stormwater in the Springfield Gardens neighborhood. The project, which is slated to be completed in 2014, also seeks to improve water quality in Jamaica Bay, the ultimate destination of all stormwater in the area. A key element of these improvements is a new "Bluebelt", the city's word for a manmade wetland that stores and cleanses stormwater before discharge into an estuary. New storm sewers will discharge stormwater into a "forebay" in the northern part of Springfield Park, where sediment will settle out of the water, and through an open channel into the existing Springfield Lake. The channel will have a marshy border featuring native wetland plants. The lake will be dredged to twice its current depth in order to improve water quality and discourage algae blooms.
