= Springfield Gardens, Queens =

Neighborhood in New York City

Springfield Gardens
- Neighborhood of Queens
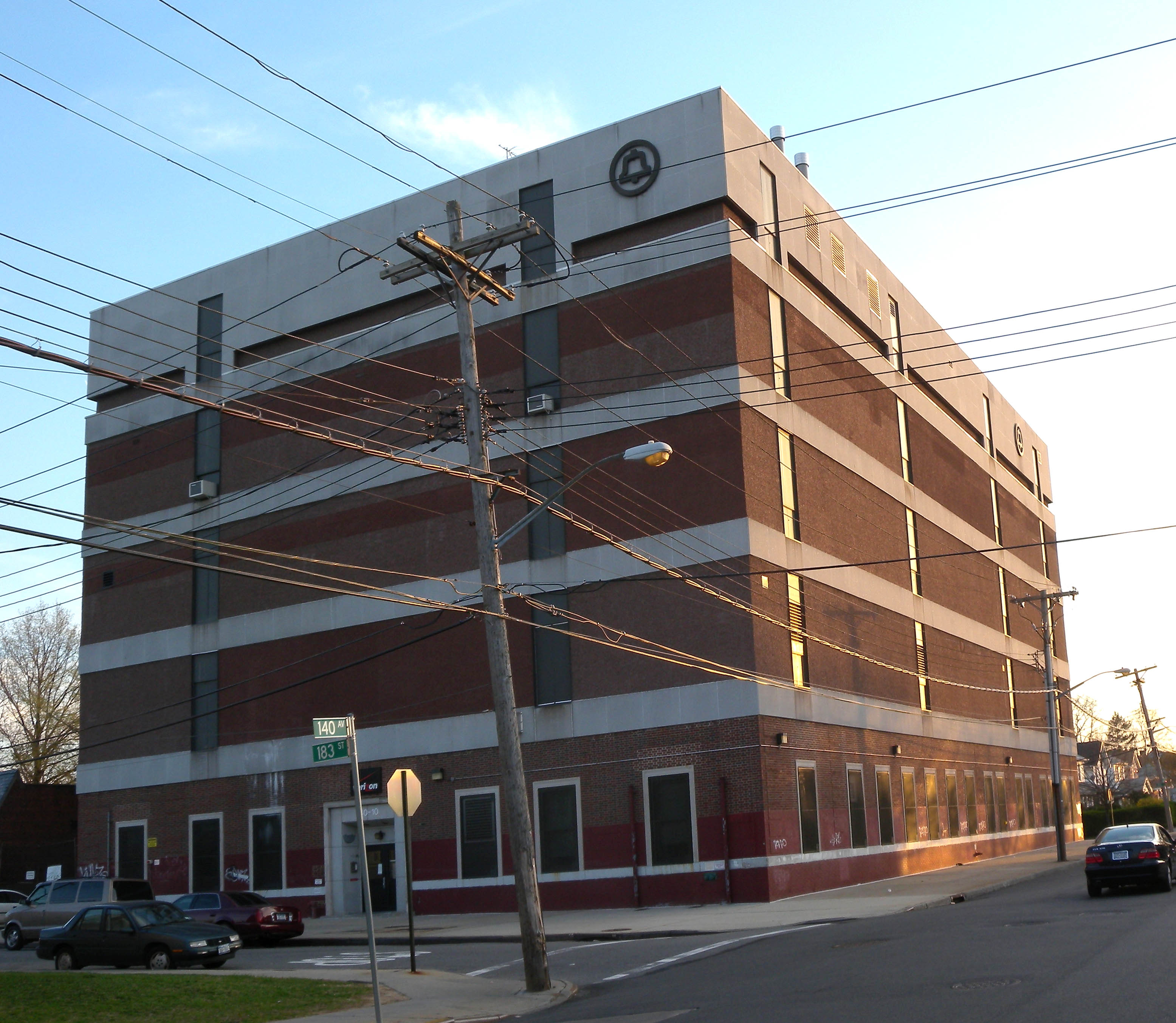
- Telephone exchange for southeastern Queens
- Location within New York City
- Coordinates: 40.66°N 73.77°W
- Country: United States
- State: New York
- City: New York City
- County/Borough: Queens
- Community District: Queens 13

Population (2000)
  - Total: 39,827

Ethnicity
  - White: 2.7%
  - Black: 91.5%
  - Hispanic: 4.4%
  - Asian: 0.6%
  - Other: 1.3%

Economics
  - Median income: $56,726
- ZIP Code: 11413, 11434
- Area codes: 718, 347, 929, and 917

Springfield Gardens is a neighborhood in the southeastern area of the New York City borough of Queens, bounded to the north by St. Albans, to the east by Laurelton and Rosedale, to the south by John F. Kennedy International Airport, and to the west by Farmers Boulevard. The neighborhood is served by Queens Community Board 12. The area, particularly east of Springfield Boulevard, is sometimes also referred to as Brookville.

== History ==
The area was first settled by Europeans in 1660, and was subsequently farmed until the mid nineteenth-century.

Major residential development came in the 1920s as Long Island Rail Road service was expanded to the area at the Springfield Gardens station (closed in 1979). Between 1920 and 1930 the population increased from 3,046 to 13,089, with a lot of the newcomers being people from Brooklyn seeking out suburban homes. In 1927, the community became known as Springfield Gardens.

Farmers, Merrick, Springfield, Rockaway, and Guy R. Brewer Boulevards all are major streets in the area.

Today the area maintains its low-rise suburban nature. It is home to majority Afro-Caribbean and Indo-Caribbean populations including immigrants from Jamaica, Trinidad, Haiti and Guyana. Many homes have been torn down and remade for more families as more people move into the neighborhood. Part is in a Registered historic District. Springfield Gardens is located within ZIP Codes 11434 (western part) and 11413 (eastern part).

== Recreation ==
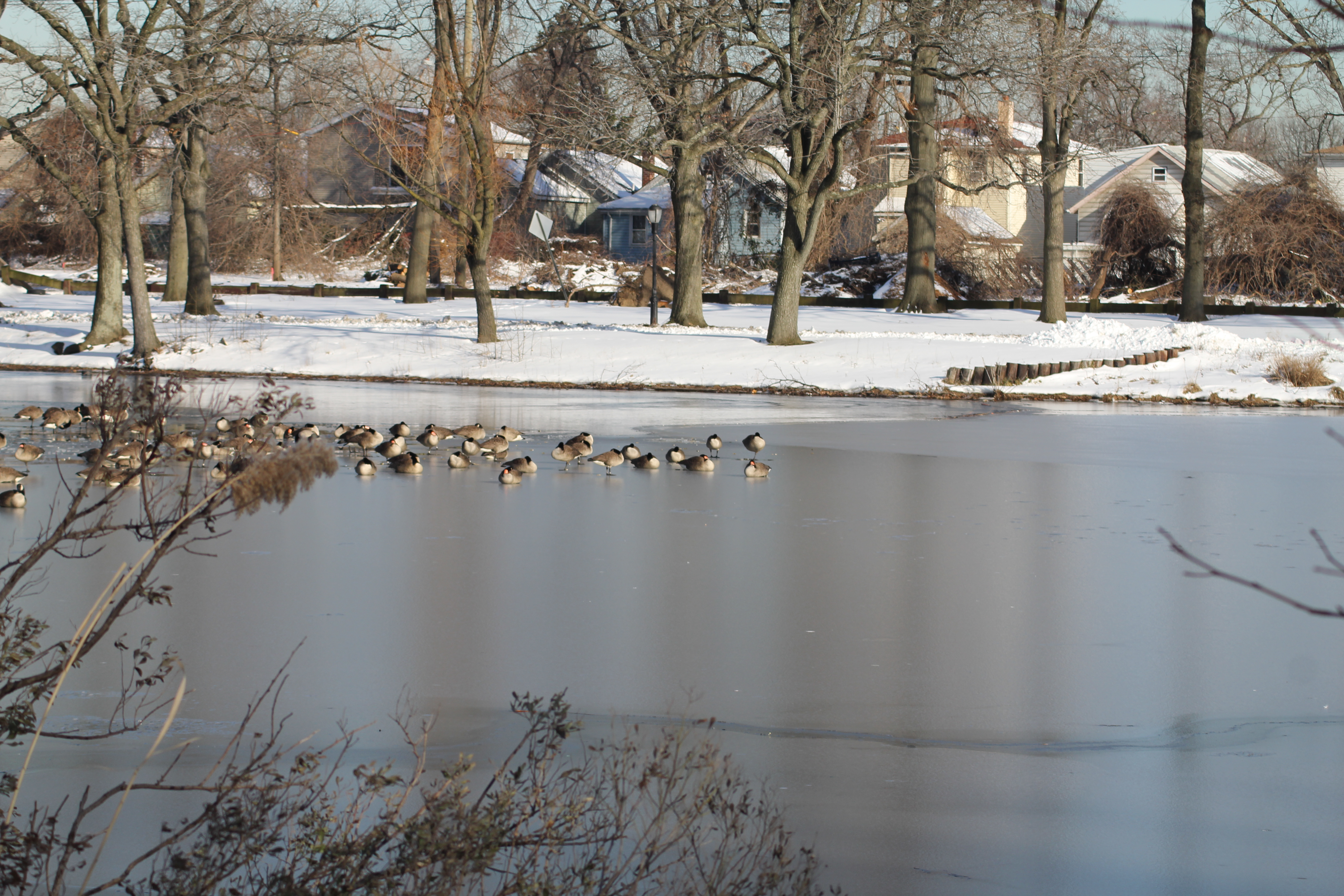
A part of Springfield Lake in Springfield Park

Springfield Park consists of 23.54 acres (9.53 ha), including the sizable Springfield Lake at its center. It is located on the west side of Springfield Boulevard between 145th Road and 147th Avenue.

The 90-acre (36 ha) Brookville Park is located on the eastern border of Springfield Gardens (next to Rosedale). It is bounded by South Conduit Avenue, 149th Avenue, and 232nd and 235th Streets. It contains Conselyea's Pond.

== Transportation ==
Brookville is served by the Rosedale and Laurelton Long Island Rail Road stations. Service is provided by the Far Rockaway Branch and Long Beach Branch. The CityTicket program is available at these stations.

The Q3 bus travels along Farmers Boulevard towards to the 165th Street Bus Terminal in Jamaica or JFK Airport. The Q6 bus travels along Rockaway Boulevard and Sutphin Boulevard to Jamaica-165th St Bus Terminal from the JFK Airport North Boundary Road. The Q85, Q86, Q87, Q89 buses travels along South Conduit Avenue towards Rosedale or Green Acres Mall, and North Conduit Avenue. towards the Jamaica Center – Parsons/Archer subway station (E, J, and Z trains). The Q111 travels to Rosedale and Jamaica via 147th Avenue along with the Q113 and Q114 via 147th Avenue to Jamaica and Far Rockaway. The Q115 runs from Jamaica to Farmers Blvd. No express bus routes serve Brookville directly however the QM63, provides rush hour only service to neighboring Rosedale. The Q77 bus travels along Springfield Boulevard and Francis Lewis Boulevard to Jamaica-168th Street Bus Terminal and terminates at Farmers Blvd and Rockaway Blvd.

== Notable residents ==
- Khandi Alexander (born 1957), dancer, choreographer, and actress.
- Frances Goldin (1924–2020), housing rights activist and literary agent in New York City.
- John Robert Grant (1729–1790), Loyalist who fought in the American Revolutionary War.
- Cynthia Jenkins (1924–2001), librarian, community activist and politician who served in the New York State Assembly from 1983 to 1994.
- Anthony Mason (1966–2015), professional basketball player who played for 13 seasons in the NBA.
- Lil Tecca (born 2002), rapper, singer and songwriter.
- Eric Truvillion (born 1959), wide receiver who played in the USFL for the Tampa Bay Bandits and in the NFL for the Detroit Lions.
