= Rosedale: The Way It Is =

- Created by: Bill Moyers
- Country of origin: United States
- Original language: English
- No. of series: One

Original release
- Network: PBS
- Release: 2 April 1975

Rosedale: The Way It Is was a PBS documentary documenting a black family who moved into Rosedale, Queens, in 1975 in what was a predominately white area.

== Reception ==
In 2019, a clip of the video went viral when a short segment that had recorded the reactions of a group of black girls trying to understand the incident they had saw.
