= Queens Village, Queens =

Neighborhood in New York City

Queens Village
- Neighborhood
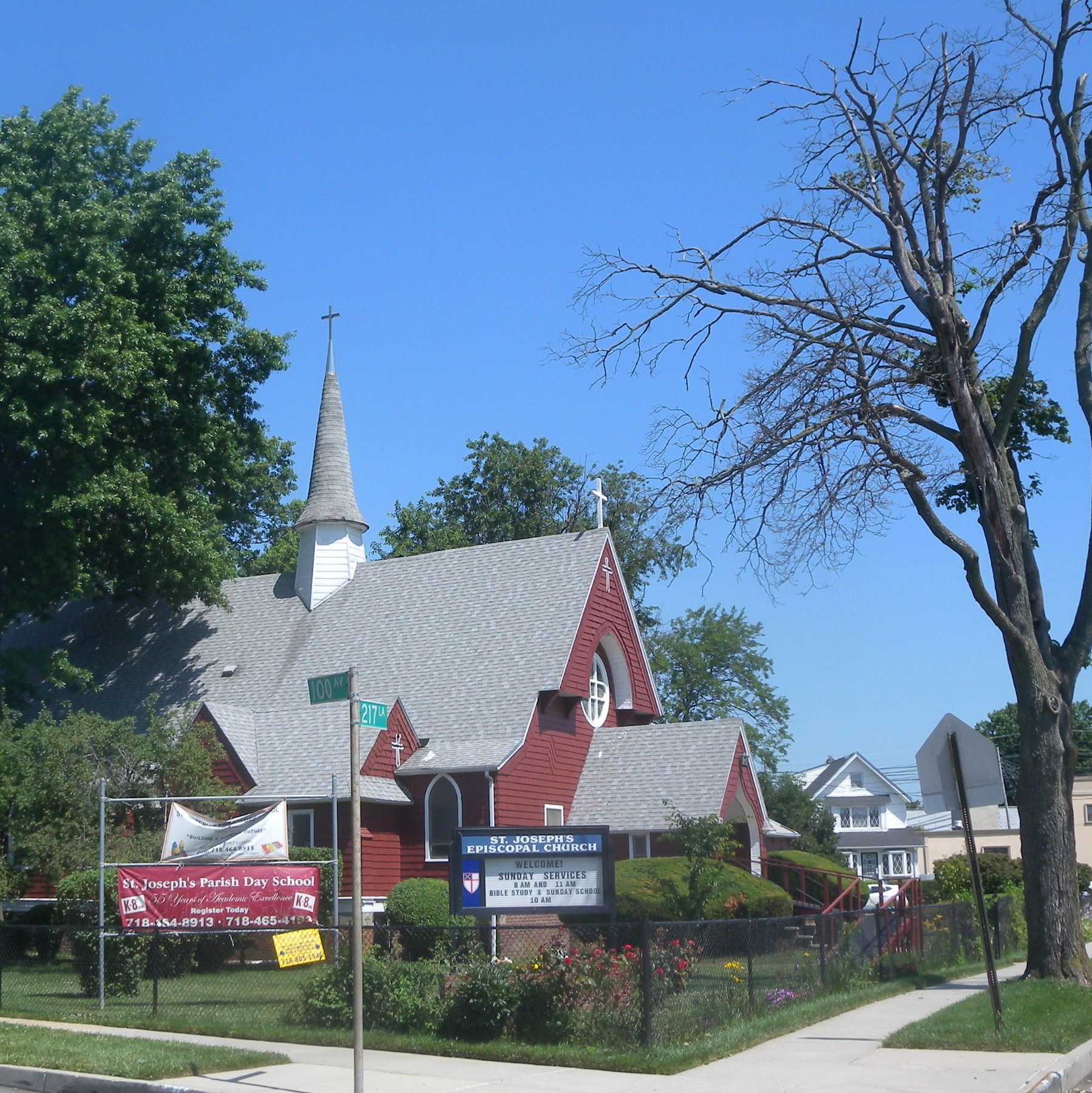
- St. Joseph's Episcopal Church
- Location within New York City
- Coordinates: 40.715°N 73.74°W
- Country: United States
- State: New York
- City: New York City
- County/Borough: Queens
- Community District: Queens 13

Population (2010)
  - Total: 52,504

Ethnicity
  - Black: 50.2%
  - Hispanic: 18.4%
  - Asian: 16.0%
  - White: 6.3%
  - Other/Multiracial: 9.1%

Economics
  - Median income: $74,376
- Time zone: UTC−5 (EST)
  - Summer (DST): UTC−4 (EDT)
- ZIP Codes: 11427, 11428, 11429
- Area codes: 718, 347, 929, and 917

Queens Village is a mostly residential middle class neighborhood in the eastern part of the New York City borough of Queens. It is bound by Hollis to the west, Cambria Heights to the south, Bellerose, Queens and Elmont, Nassau County to the east, and Oakland Gardens to the north.

Shopping in the community is located along Braddock Avenue, Hillside Avenue, Hempstead Avenue, Jamaica Avenue (NY 25), Francis Lewis Boulevard, and Springfield Boulevard. Located just east of Queens Village, in Elmont, Nassau County, is the Belmont Park race track.

Close to the neighborhood are Cunningham Park and Alley Pond Park, as well as the historic Long Island Motor Parkway (LIMP), home of the turn of the century racing competition, the Vanderbilt Cup. The LIMP was built by William Kissam Vanderbilt, a descendant of the family that presided over the New York Central Railroad and Western Union; it is now part of the Brooklyn–Queens Greenway.

Queens Village is located in Queens Community District 13 and its ZIP Codes are 11427, 11428, and 11429. It is patrolled by the New York City Police Department's 105th Precinct. Politically, Queens Village is represented by the New York City Council's 23rd District.

== History ==
Queens Village was founded as Little Plains in the 1640s. Homage to this part of Queens Village history is found on the sign above the Long Island Railroad Station there. In 1824, Thomas Brush established a blacksmith shop in the area. He prospered and built several other shops and a factory, and the area soon became known as Brushville. On March 1, 1837, the railroad arrived. The first station in the area was called Flushing Avenue in 1837, Delancy Avenue by June 20, 1837, and Brushville by November 27, 1837, likely about a mile west of the present station. In 1856, residents voted to change the name from Brushville to Queens. The name "Inglewood" also was used for both the village and the train station in the 1860s and 1870s. The name Brushville was still used in an 1860 New York Times article, but both "Queens" and "Brushville" are used in an 1870 article. Maps from 1873 show portions of Queens Village (then called Inglewood and Queens) in the town of Hempstead, but 1891 maps show it entirely in the town of Jamaica.

After the Borough of Queens became incorporated as part of the City of Greater New York in 1898, and the new county of Nassau was created in 1899, the border between the city and Nassau County was set directly east of Queens Village. A 1901 article in the Brooklyn Eagle already uses the full name Queens Village, a name that had been used as late as the 1880s for Lloyd's Neck in present-day Suffolk County. In 1923, the Long Island Railroad added "Village" to its station's name to avoid confusion with the county of the same name, and thus the neighborhood became known as Queens Village.

Queens Village was part of an overall housing boom that was spreading east through Queens from New York as people from the city sought the bucolic life afforded by the less-crowded atmosphere of the area. Today, many of those charming and well-maintained Dutch Colonial and Tudor homes built in Queens Village during the 1920s and 1930s continue to attract a diverse population.

=== Other Queens Village on Long Island ===
Lloyd Harbor, New York, which was formerly in Queens County but now in Suffolk County, was known as Queens Village from 1685 until as late as 1883. In 1885, known then as Lloyd Neck, it seceded from Queens County and became part of the town of Huntington in Suffolk County.

== Subsections ==
=== Bellaire ===
Bellaire is in western Queens Village next to Hollis and covers the area surrounding Jamaica Avenue and 211th Street. Bellaire is the largest section of Queens Village. The area considered Bellaire usually falls under the general title of Queens Village. There was once a Long Island Rail Road station named Bellaire. 211th Street, formerly known as Belleaire Boulevard has traffic medians on it indicating its history as the main route through this section of Queens Village.

=== Hollis Hills ===
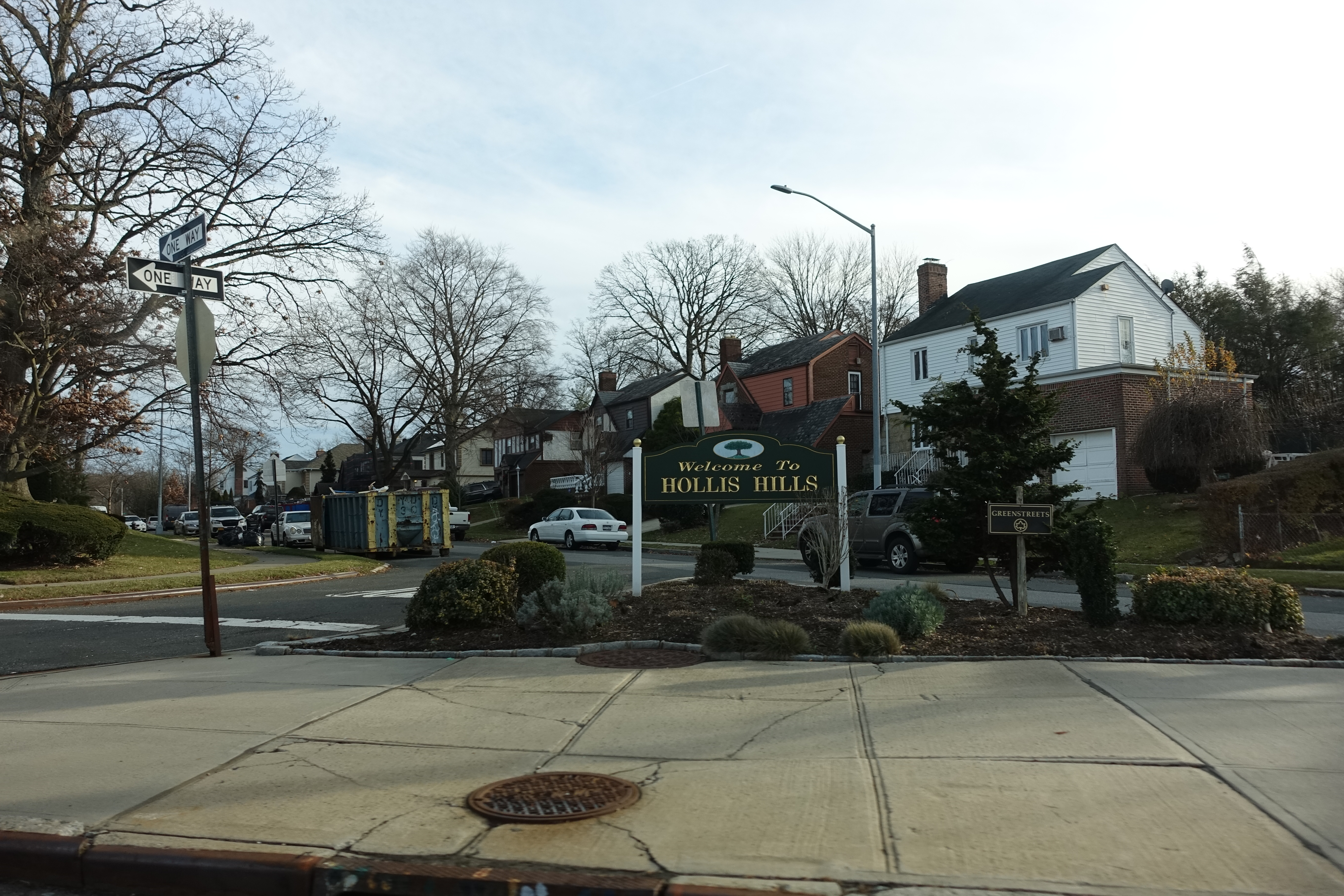
A welcome sign for Hollis Hills on Union Turnpike

Hollis Hills is an affluent subsection, generally bounded by Springfield Boulevard to the east, Grand Central Parkway the south, Hollis Hills Terrace to the west, and Kingsbury Avenue and Richland Avenue the north. It is slightly above sea level due to a retreating glacier from the last Ice Age. A small pond called Potamogeton Pond exists at Bell Boulevard on the north side of Grand Central Parkway.

Most homes in Hollis Hills are of the Colonial, Tudor, and Ranch styles. Houses here attract predominantly the upper-middle class as some houses in the area can fetch prices of $1,500,000 or higher. This neighborhood, similar to Douglaston, is a quasi-suburb, with detached homes sitting on large tree-lined lots. Surrey Estates, a section of Hollis Hills, is a smaller triangle of architecturally notable homes surrounded by old, large trees and is bound by Union Turnpike, Springfield Boulevard, and Hartland Avenue within Hollis Hills.

Notable institutions in Hollis Hills are The Chapel of the Redeemer Lutheran, Hollis Hills Jewish Center (founded in 1948), American Martyrs Catholic Church, the Windsor Park Branch of the Queens Public Library, the John Hamburg Community Center, Kingsbury Elementary School (P.S. 188), Hollis Hills Civic Association, and Surrey Estates Homeowners Association.

== Demographics ==
Queens Village, which is stipulated as Neighborhood Tabulation Area QN1303 by the New York City Department of City Planning, had 54,345 inhabitants based on data from the 2020 United States Census and covered an area of 1,611.17 acres (652.02 ha). This was an increase of 1,841 persons (3.50%) from the 52,504 counted in 2010. The neighborhood had a population density of 34.0 inhabitants per acre (14,500/sq mi; 5,600/km^{2}).

The racial makeup of the neighborhood was 4.5% (2,456) White (Non-Hispanic), 42.2% (22,922) Black (Non-Hispanic), 22.2% (12,071) Asian, 7.3% (3,968) from other races, and 6.2% (3,343) from two or more races. Hispanic or Latino of any race were 17.6%(9,585) of the population.

According to the 2020 United States Census, Queens Village has many cultural communities of over 1,000 inhabitants. This include residents who identify as Dominican, Puerto Rican, African American, Haitian, Jamaican, Indian, Bangladeshi, Filipino, and Guyanese. 51.1% of the residents in Queens Village were foreign born.

Queens Village, like many parts of Queens, is diverse. Formerly, a very large Jewish community existed. However, many Jewish families have left for other parts of Queens and parts of Long Island. Still, there is a small Jewish presence in Queens Village that has recently been augmented by an increase of Middle Eastern Jews.

Most inhabitants are middle-aged adults: 20.8% are between the ages of between 0–19, 27.5% between 20 and 39, 27.5% between 40 and 59, and 24% older than 60. 65.3% of the households had at least one family present.

The entirety of Community Board 13, which mainly comprises Queens Village but also includes other areas, had 193,787 inhabitants as of NYC Health's 2018 Community Health Profile, with an average life expectancy of 82.9 years. This is higher than the median life expectancy of 81.2 for all New York City neighborhoods. Most inhabitants are youth and middle-aged adults: 20% are between the ages of between 0–17, 26% between 25 and 44, and 29% between 45 and 64. The ratio of college-aged and elderly residents was lower, at 9% and 16% respectively.

As of 2017, the median household income in Community Board 13 was $85,857. In 2018, an estimated 13% of Queens Village residents lived in poverty, compared to 19% in all of Queens and 20% in all of New York City. One in twelve residents (8%) were unemployed, compared to 8% in Queens and 9% in New York City. Rent burden, or the percentage of residents who have difficulty paying their rent, is 50% in Queens Village, lower than the boroughwide and citywide rates of 53% and 51% respectively. Based on this calculation, as of 2018, Queens Village are considered to be high-income relative to the rest of the city and not gentrifying.

== Police and crime ==
Queens Village is patrolled by the 105th Precinct of the NYPD, located at 92–08 222nd Street. The 105th Precinct ranked 17th safest out of 69 patrol areas for per-capita crime in 2010. As of 2018, with a non-fatal assault rate of 29 per 100,000 people, Queens Village's rate of violent crimes per capita is less than that of the city as a whole. The incarceration rate of 378 per 100,000 people is lower than that of the city as a whole.

The 105th Precinct has a lower crime rate than in the 1990s, with crimes across all categories having decreased by 79.4% between 1990 and 2018. The precinct reported 9 murders, 24 rapes, 197 robberies, 405 felony assaults, 266 burglaries, 589 grand larcenies, and 164 grand larcenies auto in 2018.

== Politics ==
Queens Village is part of the 14h New York State Senate district, represented by Leroy Comrie; the 23rd New York State Assembly district, represented by Clyde Vanel; District 32 in the New York City Council, represented by Nantasha Williams; 5th congressional district in the United States House of Representatives, represented by Gregory W. Meeks; and represented by Charles E. Schumer and Kirsten Gillibrand in the United States Senate.

== Fire safety ==
Queens Village contains a New York City Fire Department (FDNY) fire station, Engine Co. 304/Ladder Co. 162, at 218–44 97th Avenue.

== Health ==
As of 2018, preterm births are more common in Queens Village than in other places citywide, though births to teenage mothers are less common. In Queens Village, there were 111 preterm births per 1,000 live births (compared to 87 per 1,000 citywide), and 8.8 births to teenage mothers per 1,000 live births (compared to 19.3 per 1,000 citywide). Queens Village has an about-average population of residents who are uninsured. In 2018, this population of uninsured residents was estimated to be 11%, about the same as the citywide rate of 12%.

The concentration of fine particulate matter, the deadliest type of air pollutant, in Queens Village is 0.0065 milligrams per cubic metre (6.5×10^{−9} oz/ft^{3}), less than the city average. Twelve percent of Queens Village residents are smokers, which is lower than the city average of 14% of residents being smokers. In Queens Village, 27% of residents are obese, 14% are diabetic, and 37% have high blood pressure—compared to the citywide averages of 22%, 8%, and 23% respectively. In addition, 20% of children are obese, compared to the citywide average of 20%.

Eighty-six percent of residents eat some fruits and vegetables every day, which is slightly less than the city's average of 87%. In 2018, 74% of residents described their health as "good", "very good", or "excellent", lower than the city's average of 78%. For every supermarket in Queens Village, there are 14 bodegas.

The nearest major hospitals are Jamaica Hospital and Queens Hospital Center, both located in Jamaica.

== Post offices and ZIP Codes ==
Queens Village is covered by 3 ZIP Codes. From north to south they are 11427 north of 90th Avenue, 11428 between 90th and 99th Avenues, and 11429 between 99th and 114th Avenues. The United States Post Office operates one post office nearby: the Queens Village Station at 209–20 Jamaica Avenue.

== Education ==
Queens Village generally has a similar rate of college-educated residents to the rest of the city as of 2018. While 38% of residents age 25 and older have a college education or higher, 13% have less than a high school education and 49% are high school graduates or have some college education. By contrast, 39% of Queens residents and 43% of city residents have a college education or higher. The percentage of Queens Village students excelling in math rose from 42% in 2000 to 59% in 2011, and reading achievement decreased slightly from 52% to 50% during the same time period.

Queens Village's rate of elementary school student absenteeism is less than the rest of New York City. In Queens Village, 15% of elementary school students missed twenty or more days per school year, lower than the citywide average of 20%. Additionally, 83% of high school students in Queens Village graduate on time, higher than the citywide average of 75%.

=== Schools ===
Public schools in Queens Village are operated by the New York City Department of Education and include the following:

- P.S. 018 The Winchester School
- P.S./I.S. 295
- P.S. 33 Edward M Funk School
- P.S. 95 Eastwood School
- I.S. 109 Jean Nuzzi Intermediate School
- M.S 172 Irwin Altman
- Queens Gateway to Health Sciences Secondary School
- P.S. 034 John Harvard School
- P.S. 135 The Bellaire School
- P.S.188
- Martin Van Buren High School

Private schools include:

- Saints Joachim and Anne School
- Incarnation R.C. School

=== Library ===
The Queens Public Library operates the Queens Village branch at 94–11 217th Street.

== Transportation ==
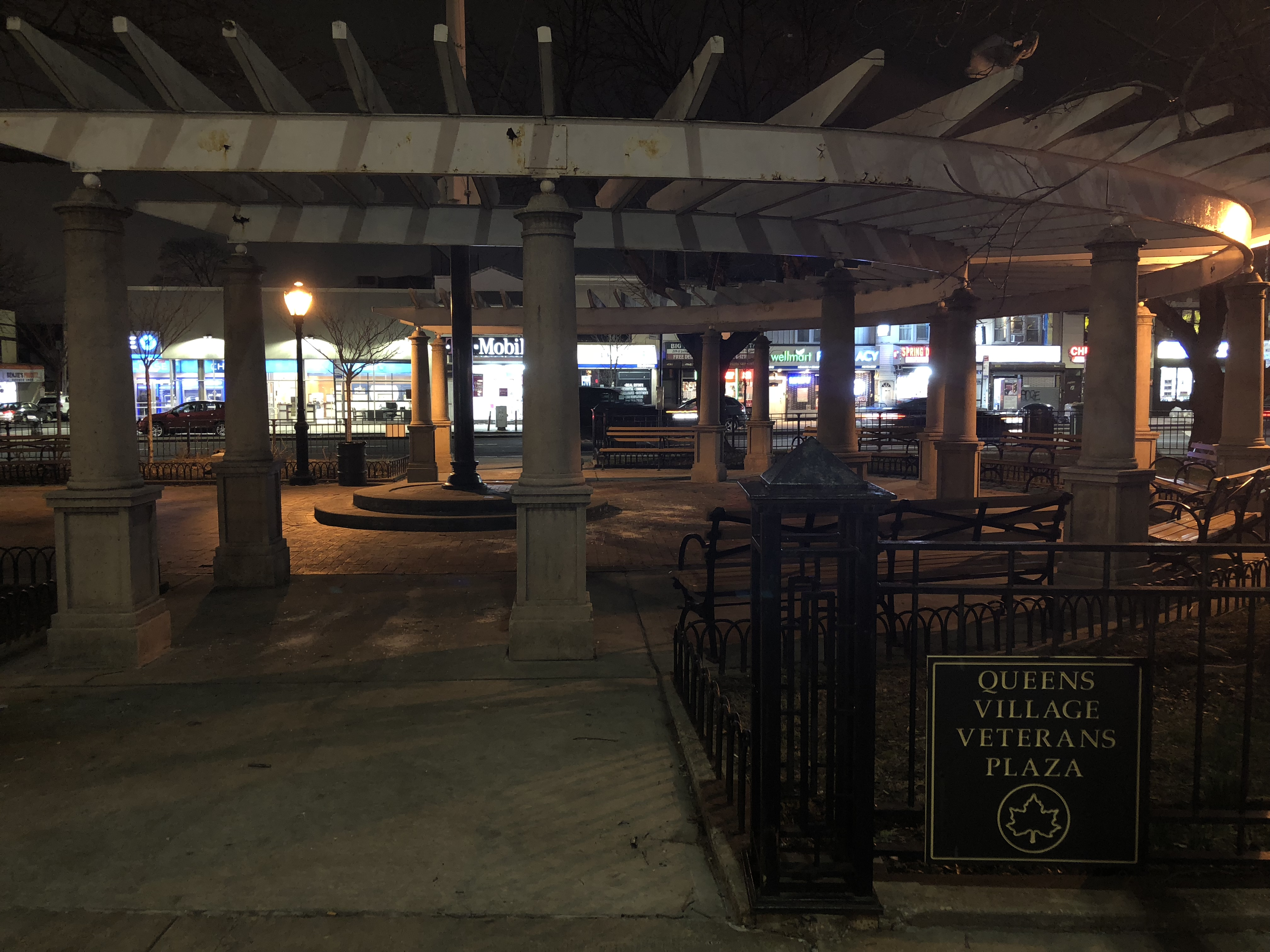
Queens Village Veterans Plaza near the Queens Village LIRR station

Queens Village station, located at Amboy Lane (on the corner of Springfield Boulevard and Jamaica Avenue), offers service on the Long Island Rail Road's Hempstead Branch.

Though no New York City Subway stations serve Queens Village, there are several bus routes that connect to the subway, including MTA Regional Bus Operations' Q1, Q2, Q27, Q36, Q43, Q77, Q82, Q83, Q88 and Q110, and Nassau Inter-County Express' n1, n6, n6X, n22, n22X, n24 and n26 routes. In addition, the MTA's QM68 express bus runs directly to Manhattan.

Queens Village is served by intercity buses operated by Greyhound. Short Line, and Adirondack Trailways also offers service. The buses stop near the intersection of Hillside Avenue and Springfield Boulevard.

== Notable residents ==
- Chy Davidson (born 1959), former NFL wide receiver who played two seasons with the New York Jets.
- George Gately (1928–2001), creator of the Heathcliff comic strip
- Karine Jean-Pierre (born 1974), political advisor who served as the White House Press Secretary from 2022 to 2025.
- Nancy Malone (1935–2014), actor, director, producer, television executive
- Charles Henry Miller (1842–1922), landscape painter
- Paul Newman (1925–2008), actor, from 1953 to 1954
- Tom Pecora (born 1958), college basketball coach who is currently the head coach for the Quinnipiac Bobcats men's basketball team
- Fred W. Preller (1902–1974), politician who served as a New York State Assemblyman from 1944 until 1965
- The Rockin' Chairs, a doo-wop group in the 1950s
- Christopher Romulo, former professional Muay Thai fighter
- Julius Schwartz (1915–2004), comic book editor and a science fiction agent
- Matthew Troy (1929–2004), lawyer and politician, who was a member of the New York City Council
- Tevi Troy (born 1967), Deputy Secretary of the United States Department of Health and Human Services
- George Vande Woude (1935–2021), cancer researcher
- Christian Vital (born 1997), basketball player in the Israeli Basketball Premier League
- Melvyn Weiss (1935–2018), attorney who co-founded the plaintiff class action law firm Milberg Weiss.
- Roy Wilkins (1901–1981), activist in the civil rights movement
