= Springfield Boulevard =

Boulevard in Queens, New York

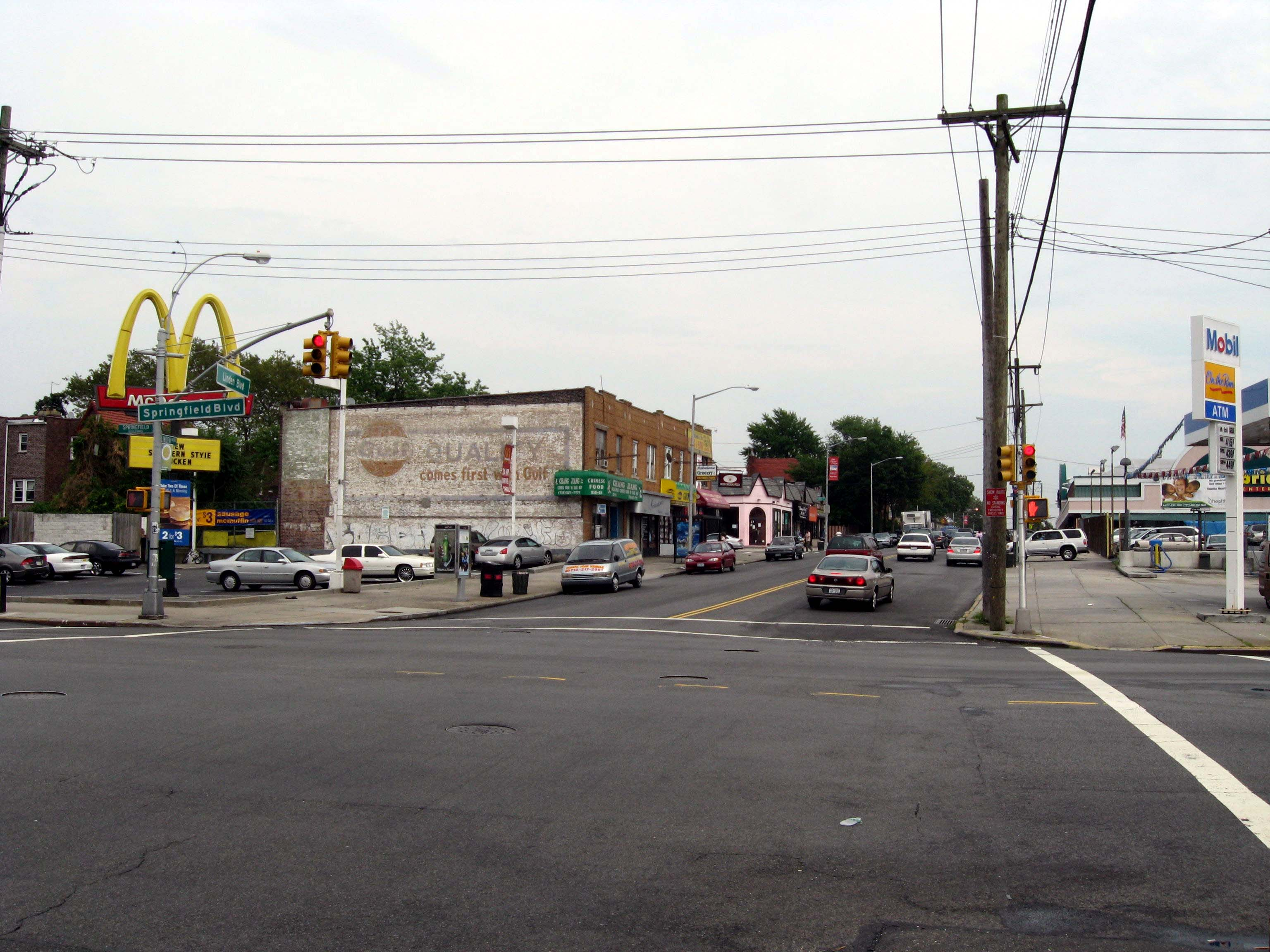
- Looking east across Springfield Boulevard along Linden Boulevard in Cambria Heights
- Owner: City of New York
- Maintained by: NYCDOT
- Length: 7.8 mi (12.6 km)
- Location: Queens, New York City
- Coordinates: 40°42′27.89″N 73°44′19.61″W
- South end: 147th Avenue in Springfield Gardens
- Major junctions: Belt Parkway / NY 27 in Rochdale; NY 25 / NY 25B in Queens Village; I-495 in Bayside
- North end: NY 25A in Bayside

Springfield Boulevard is a major north/south roadway that runs through the eastern section of Queens, New York. It is 7.8 miles (12.6 km) long and goes from Northern Boulevard in Bayside, to 147th Avenue in Springfield Gardens. Springfield Boulevard runs through Bayside, Oakland Gardens, Hollis Hills, Queens Village, Cambria Heights, Laurelton, Springfield Gardens and along the eastern border of St. Albans. The name "Springfield," derived from the Springfield Armory, is one of several firearms-oriented street names in the area. This is the result of the National Rifle Range having been situated on the grounds of what is now Creedmoor State Hospital during the 19th and early 20th centuries.

== Route description ==
The north end of Springfield Boulevard is a simple two-way two lane street in southeastern Bayside. It gradually gets wider as it heads towards Springfield Gardens. At some time the city widened Springfield Boulevard in Queens Village from 112th Avenue to Jamaica Avenue, in character with its name as a "Boulevard". South of Jamaica Avenue, it gains a strip median used as a turning lane for intersections, and south of 112th Avenue all the way to 147th Avenue, it gains a median divider.

== Major intersections ==
Springfield Boulevard intersects with many major roads including Northern Boulevard, Union Turnpike, Hillside Avenue, Jamaica Avenue, Hempstead Avenue, Linden Boulevard, Francis Lewis Boulevard and Merrick Boulevard. At its southern end, Springfield Boulevard once continued to Rockaway Boulevard; however, frequent flooding led to that stretch being closed. The land there has been developed into a distribution center.

== Transportation ==
Springfield Boulevard is served by the following bus routes:

- The Q1 short turns from Jamaica drops off at Springfield Boulevard & Hillside Avenue then turns back around Braddock Avenue to Hillside Avenue going back to Jamaica.
- The Q2 runs between Hollis and Hempstead Avenues.
- The Q27 runs between 56th Avenue and either Francis Lewis Boulevard (Cambria Heights) or 120th Avenue (Flushing), with service originating at 121st Avenue. At 56th Avenue, the bus heads east or west, depending on whether Queensborough Community College is open.
- The Q36 runs between Hillside and Jamaica Avenues.
- The Q51 runs between Linden Boulevard and 118th Avenue in order to turn back west.
- The Q74 and Q75 run between Horace Harding Expressway and 56th Avenue (QCC) or 58th Avenue (opposite terminals). The latter bus runs weekdays only.
- From either North Conduit Avenue (Jamaica terminals), or South Conduit Avenue (opposite terminals), the Q85 and Q89 go to 140th Avenue.
- The Q77 runs the full length of Springfield south of Francis Lewis Boulevard.
- The Q83 runs from Colfax Street to 114th Avenue (Cambria Heights), and from 113th Drive to Murdock Avenue (Jamaica).
- The Q88 runs between Jamaica and 73rd Avenues.
- From there, the QM5, QM8 and QM35 take over until Horace Harding Expressway.

== Education ==
Many high schools are located near Springfield Boulevard, including Springfield Gardens High School, Martin Van Buren High School, and Benjamin Cardozo High School. Queensborough Community College is also located fairly close to Springfield Boulevard in Bayside.
