= Cambria Heights, Queens =

Neighborhood in New York City

Cambria Heights
- Neighborhood of Queens
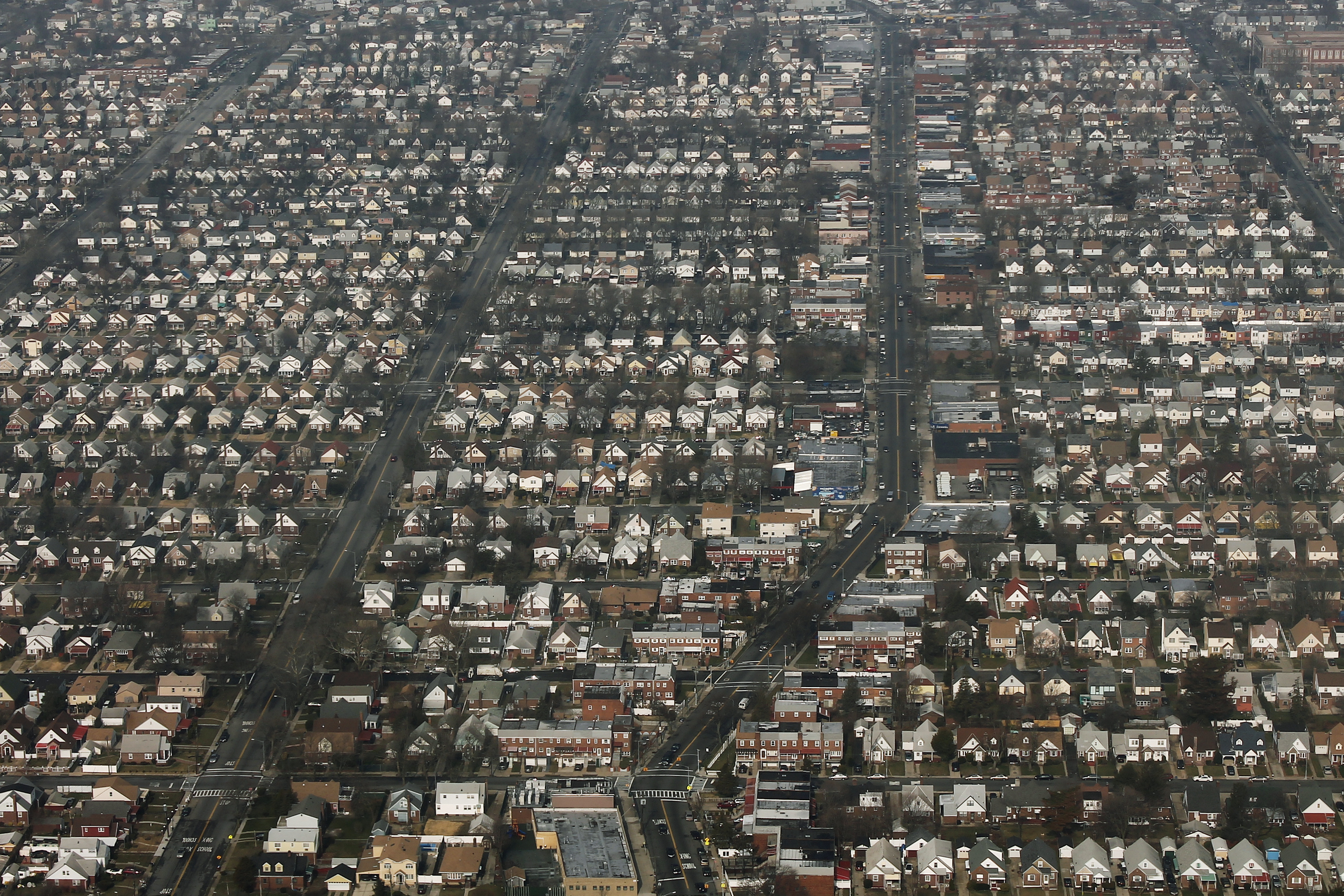
- Interactive map of Cambria Heights
- Coordinates: 40.695°N 73.735°W
- Country: United States
- State: New York
- City: New York City
- County/Borough: Queens
- Community District: Queens 13
- Named for: Cambria Construction Company
- Elevation: 49 ft (15 m)

Population (2020)
  - Total: 19,081
- ZIP Code: 11411
- Area codes: 718, 347, 929, and 917

Cambria Heights is a residential neighborhood in the southeastern portion of the New York City borough of Queens. It is bounded by Springfield Boulevard, Francis Lewis Boulevard, and St. Albans to the west, the Elmont, Nassau County border on the east, Queens Village to the north, and Montefiore Cemetery and Laurelton, Springfield Gardens, and Rosedale to the south. As of 2010, Cambria Heights's population was 18,677. The neighborhood is part of Queens Community Board 13.

== Etymology ==
The name Cambria Heights was coined in the mid-1920s when the Cambria Title Savings and Trust Company, a bank based in Cambria County, Pennsylvania, provided financing for early development which was aimed at families seeking to relocate from rental apartments in other boroughs. Named for its position above the surrounding area, the neighborhood is at an elevation of 50 feet (15 m) above sea level; though Glen Oaks is the highest in the borough, Cambria Heights is considered to be one of the highest points in Queens -- together with Jackson Heights and Richmond Hill -- and of all Long Island.

== Education ==
The public elementary schools in Cambria Heights are PS 176 Cambria Heights (grades PK–5) and PS/MS 147 Ronald McNair (PK–8). There are four magnet high schools on the campus of Andrew Jackson High School, which are dedicated to: arts and humanities; business computer applications; mathematics, science and technology; and law, government and community service.There are also 2 private schools in Cambria Heights named Cambria Center for the Gifted Child,(C.C.G.C) and Cambria School of Excellence (C.S.E). C.C.G.C goes from pk- Grade 5, and its sister school( which is merged into C.C.G.C) is from 6-8th grade. C.C.G.C was first opened in about 1980, and C.S.E in late 2010–2011.

== Religion ==
Cambria Heights has a high concentration of Christian church communities. There are many storefront churches located along Linden Boulevard, from a variety of denominations as well as nondenominational groups. Cambria Heights is also home to Cambria Heights Community Church, Prince of Peace Lutheran Church, Holy Trinity Parish Church, Queens Tabernacle Church, First Faith Baptist Church, Harvest Revival Christian Fellowship, Good Life Deliverance Ministry, Saint David's Episcopal Church, and Sacred Heart Catholic Church. The Catholic parish has an affiliated school. Sacred Heart Catholic Academy.

Cambria Heights is also the location of the Ohel, the resting place of the Lubavitcher Rebbe, Rabbi Menachem M. Schneerson and his predecessor Rabbi Yosef Yitzchak Schneersohn. Tens of thousands of visitors from around the world flock to the site for prayer and blessing.

== Demographics ==
Cambria Heights, which is stipulated as Neighborhood Tabulation Area QN1304 by the New York City Department of City Planning, had 19,081 inhabitants based on data from the 2020 United States Census and covered an area of 772.01 acres (312.42 ha). This was an increase of 404 persons (2.16%) from the 18,677 counted in 2010. The neighborhood had a population density of 25.2 inhabitants per acre (27,100/sq mi; 10,500/km^{2}).

The racial makeup of the neighborhood was 1.4% (272) White (Non-Hispanic), 84.5% (16,121) Black (Non-Hispanic), 1.4% (259) Asian, 1.5% (292) from other races, and 4.4% (833) from two or more races. Hispanic or Latino of any race were 6.8% (1,304) of the population.

According to the 2020 United States Census, Cambria Heights has many cultural communities of over 1,000 inhabitants. This include residents who identify as African American, Haitian, and Jamaican. 38.7% of the residents in Cambria Heights were foreign born.

Most inhabitants are higher-aged adults: 18.8% are between the ages of between 0–19, 24.7% between 20 and 39, 27.5% between 40 and 59, and 28.7% older than 60. 77.4% of the households had at least one family present.

== Politics ==
Cambria Heights is part of the 14h New York State Senate district, represented by Leroy Comrie; the 23rd New York State Assembly district, represented by Clyde Vanel; District 32 in the New York City Council, represented by Nantasha Williams; 5th congressional district in the United States House of Representatives, represented by Gregory W. Meeks; and represented by Charles E. Schumer and Kirsten Gillibrand in the United States Senate.

== Historic districts ==
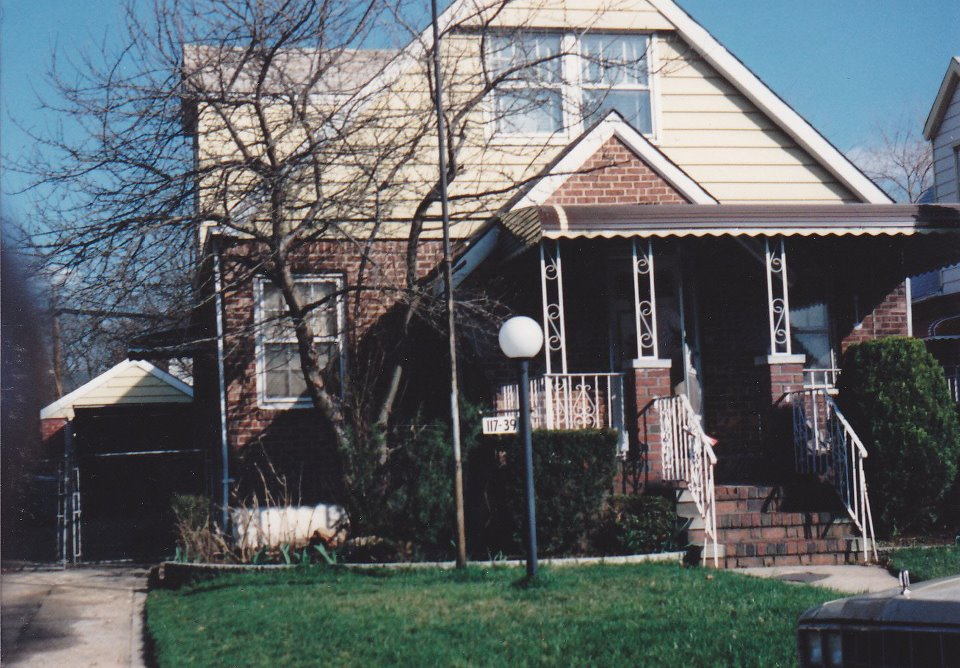
House of Tony Santiago at 117–39 220th Street

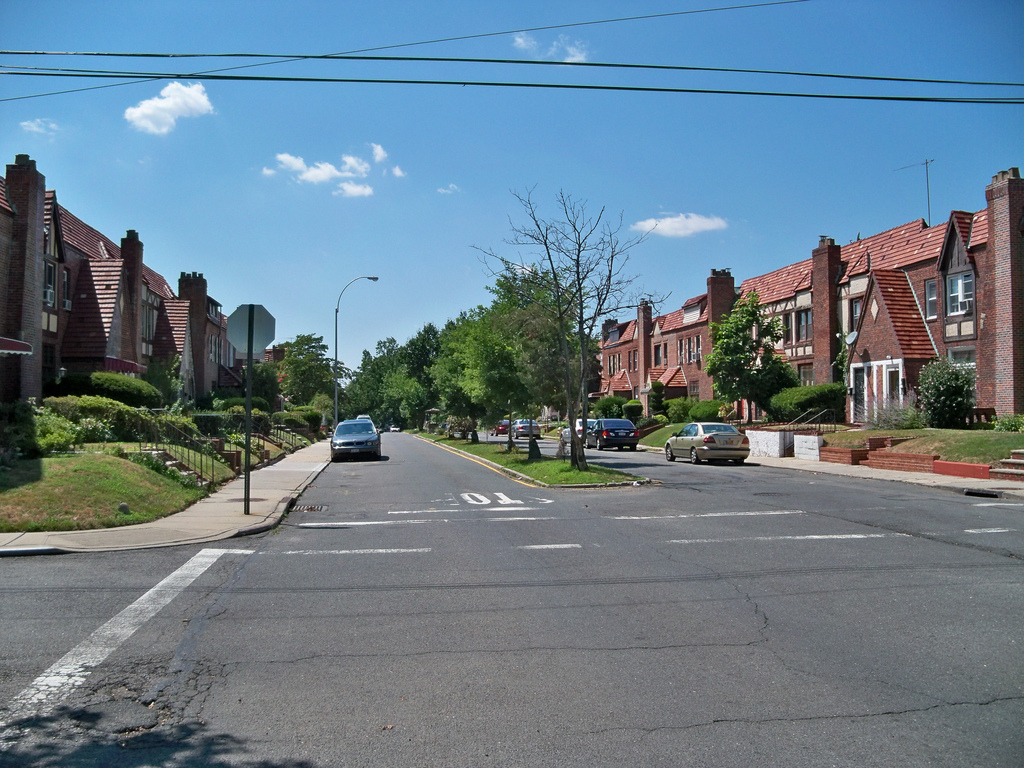
Street in Cambria Heights

The New York City Landmarks Preservation Commission designated two historic districts within the neighborhood in June 2022: the Cambria Heights–222nd Street Historic District and the Cambria Heights–227th Street Historic District. Both historic districts were originally predominantly white, like the rest of the neighborhood, but African-American families began moving to the areas by the 1950s, followed by Caribbean-American families in the 1980s. Prior to the creation of the two districts, Cambria Heights did not have any city-designated landmarks.

The Cambria Heights–222nd Street Historic District consists of 46 Storybook-style houses on 222nd Street between 115th Road and 116th Avenue, completed in 1931. The 222nd Street houses contain brick facades, Tudor arched windows, various geometric motifs, multicolored terracotta roof shingles, and chimneys with stucco-and-brick panels. These houses were designed by the firm of Monda & Bertolazzi, based in Ozone Park, Queens.

The Cambria Heights–227th Street Historic District consists of 50 Storybook-style houses on 227th Street between 116th Avenue and Linden Boulevard, also completed in 1931. The houses on 227th Street largely contain stone, brick, and stucco facades, with multicolored roof shingles and rhombus windows. These were the only houses in Cambria Heights designed by Queens-based firm Wolosoff Brothers.

== Transportation ==
Bus lines that serve through the neighborhood include the Q4, Q27, Q51, Q77, Q83 and Q84 local buses, connecting to the New York City Subway and other bus routes in Queens, as well as the QM64 express bus.

== Notable residents ==
Notable current and former residents of Cambria Heights include:

- Michael Bentt (born 1964), retired heavyweight boxer turned actor of Jamaican lineage
- Kurt Boone (born 1959), author known for his work documenting street culture
- Fred Cambria (born 1948), retired professional baseball player, a right-handed pitcher who appeared in six Major League games
- Bob Cousy (born 1928), Pro Basketball Hall of Famer attended Andrew Jackson High School
- Chick Corea (1941–2021), a Miles Davis band veteran, played electric piano for Stan Getz.
- Lena Horne (1917–2010), singer
- Ivan Lee (born 1981), Olympic saber fencer, who was banned for life by SafeSport
- Henry Petroski (1942–2023), whose 2002 book Paperboy: Confessions of a Future Engineer describes his teenage years in Cambria Heights.
- Rick Pitino (born 1952), head basketball head coach at the University of Louisville
- Lillian Roberts (born 1928), labor leader who served from 2002 through 2014 as the executive director of District Council 37 (DC37), the largest municipal union in New York City.
- Jackie Robinson (1919–1972), baseball player
- Barbara Rubin (1945–1980), filmmaker
- Tony Santiago (born 1950), military historian
- Clyde Vanel (born 1974), intellectual property attorney and entrepreneur who represents the 33rd district of the New York State Assembly
- Dennis Walcott (born 1951), Deputy Mayor for Education and Community Development in administration of Michael Bloomberg; before that, President and CEO of New York Urban League
- Mary Weiss (1948–2024), lead singer of the Shangri-Las
- Ralph Wetterhahn, U.S. Air Force Vietnam veteran and fighter pilot who grew up in Cambria Heights; scored the first aerial victory of Operation Bolo on January 2, 1967, downing a MiG-21 while flying an F-4 Phantom.
