= Francis Lewis Boulevard =

Boulevard in Queens, New York

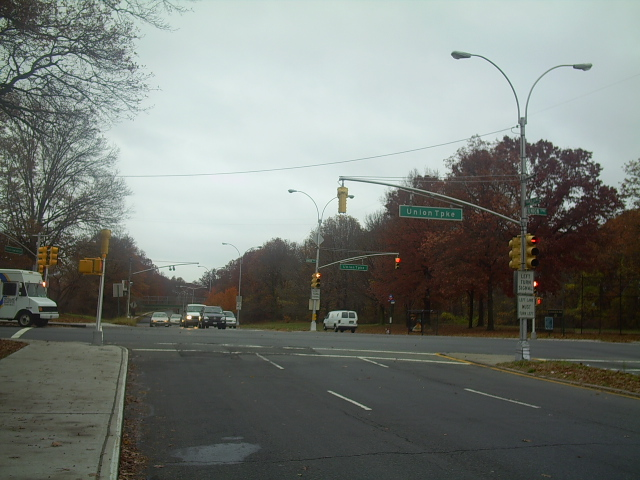
- Francis Lewis Boulevard intersecting with Union Turnpike in Cunningham Park
- Former names: Cross Island Boulevard, Rosedale Boulevard
- Owner: City of New York
- Maintained by: NYCDOT
- Length: 10.8 mi (17.4 km)
- Location: Queens, New York City
- South end: Hook Creek Boulevard in Rosedale
- Major junctions: NY 27 in Rosedale; NY 25 in Jamaica Estates; Grand Central Parkway in Cunningham Park; I-495 in Fresh Meadows; NY 25A in Auburndale
- North end: Cross Island Parkway in Whitestone

Francis Lewis Boulevard is a boulevard in the New York City borough of Queens. The roadway is named for Francis Lewis, a Queens resident who was a signer of the United States Declaration of Independence. The boulevard zigzags across Queens by including segments of several other roadways that were renamed to become parts of the boulevard.

== Route description ==
Francis Lewis Boulevard begins at an intersection with 148th Avenue and Hook Creek Boulevard in Rosedale, Queens, continues due northwest and encounters its first major intersection (with NY 27 (South Conduit Avenue and Sunrise Highway)) approximately 0.8 miles (1.3 km) later, where it also crosses under the Long Island Rail Road's Montauk Branch. Passing over the Laurelton Parkway a short distance later, Francis Lewis Boulevard then continues as a neighborhood street westbound until it reaches the intersection of 138th Avenue and 230th Place, at which point, Francis Lewis Boulevard turns right to a northeastern direction, with 138th Avenue continuing to the west and 230th Place continuing to the south.

Continuing northward from where 230th Place ends at 138th Avenue, Francis Lewis Boulevard becomes wider with a grass mall and then a painted median as it snakes around the Montefiore Cemetery in Laurelton, taking the alignment of 121st Avenue as it snakes around the cemetery. After 223rd Street, Francis Lewis Boulevard leaves 121st Avenue and resumes roughly the same northwestern alignment that it had before the Laurelton Parkway. Passing Springfield Boulevard in Cambria Heights, Queens, Francis Lewis Boulevard becomes a 4-lane road, and maintains a status as a four- or six-lane median divided street for the remainder of its run through Queens, using the alignment of what would be 206th Street south of Cunningham Park and the alignment that would be 200th Street north of it to the Port Washington Branch. Neighborhoods traversed north of Springfield Boulevard are Cambria Heights, Hollis and Queens Village the western edge of Cunningham Park in Fresh Meadows, Auburndale, Bayside, and Whitestone, passing under the LIRR Main Line at the boundary of Hollis and Queens Village, NY 25 (Hillside Avenue), the Grand Central Parkway and the Horace Harding Expressway at the south and north ends of Cunningham Park, respectively, and NY 25A (Northern Boulevard) in Bayside. After crossing under the Port Washington Branch, Francis Lewis Boulevard leaves the street grid and intersects with streets at oblique angles through the rest of its run in Whitestone to its northern terminus at the Cross Island Parkway in Whitestone. At 10.8 miles (17.4 km) long, Francis Lewis Boulevard is one of the longest streets in Queens that only runs in Queens, and is one of only two Queens street to pass uninterrupted past both Conduit Avenue and Northern Boulevard, the other being Springfield Boulevard.

One block past the south end of Francis Lewis Boulevard is Hungry Harbor Road, continuing as Rosedale Road, which proceeds east into South Valley Stream in Nassau County. Prior to the construction Marine Parkway–Gil Hodges Memorial Bridge from Brooklyn, and the bridges of Cross Bay Boulevard from Howard Beach, the combined Francis Lewis-Rosedale Road route provided one of the few routes between the Rockaways and the rest of New York City.

The Cunningham Park stretch of Francis Lewis Boulevard is notorious for drag racing, which has resulted in several fatalities to drivers and pedestrians over the years. Recently, speed cameras have been installed along this stretch. The Brooklyn-Queens Greenway also runs parallel to Francis Lewis Boulevard through Cunningham Park.

Francis Lewis Boulevard is accessible at Exit 35 of the Cross Island Parkway, Exit 24A off the Belt Parkway, Exit 20A-B off the Grand Central Parkway and Exit 26 off the Long Island Expressway.

=== Clintonville Street ===
Clintonville Street is a short street in Whitestone, beginning at 163rd Street adjacent to the west of Francis Lewis Boulevard, and running parallel to the boulevard to the Cross Island Parkway. It then extends north of the parkway to Whitestone Landing at the East River coastline. Clintonville Street was part of the original Francis Lewis Boulevard, until the boulevard was reconstructed and rerouted as part of the Whitestone Bridge and Cross Island Parkway projects.

== Etymology ==
Before being renamed in the 1930s, the roadway was called Cross Island Boulevard. The street was renamed after Francis Lewis, a signer of the Declaration of Independence who owned a home in Whitestone, to avoid confusion with the Cross Island Parkway. Portions of the boulevard were built through Lewis' Whitestone estate. Many residents that live by the street usually refer to Francis Lewis Boulevard as simply "Franny Lew".

The name of Clintonville Street is a reference to the early name of the Whitestone area, Clintonville. The area was named Clintonville after former New York City mayor and New York State governor DeWitt Clinton.

== History ==
Prior to being mapped out, what is now Francis Lewis Boulevard consisted of several separate narrow roads, including some that dated back to the American Revolutionary War, and some which ran along Native American trails. These roads appeared on late 18th Century maps created by British general Sir Henry Clinton. The Whitestone section of the route now known as Clintonville Street was initially called 11th Avenue. South of Cryders Lane and the current Cross Island Parkway in northern Whitestone to what is now Northern Boulevard (then Broadway or Jackson Avenue), the route was known as Whitestone Road and Whitestone Boulevard, and later Beechhurst Avenue. Streets along the route in Southeast Queens were called Rosedale Avenue, Squier Street, Sutro Street, and Dunton Avenue. Rosedale Avenue had been laid out in the 1890s in Rosedale (then Foster's Meadow), and served as the primary thoroughfare for the town.

The entire route was first mapped in 1912 or 1913 by the Queens Topographical Bureau as Rosedale Boulevard, as part of the Hollis Tentative Map for Queens which mapped roads through Southeast Queens such as the future Grand Central Parkway. The road at this time was referred to as a "cattle guard", likely due to rough terrain along the route. In 1917, the city proposed a north-to-south "Cross Island Boulevard", combining the existing roads in northern Queens with the planned Rosedale Boulevard. The road was planned to be 80 feet (24 m) wide. The name of the route was officially changed to Cross Island Boulevard in the 1920s. This name change was opposed by residents in Rosedale, who wished to retain the Rosedale Avenue name.

Prior to the 1940s, the boulevard consisted of two sections separated by Cunningham Park, with only the northern spur officially called Cross Island Boulevard. In late 1932, the city finalized plans to extend Cross Island Boulevard south to Springfield Boulevard and Linden Boulevard in southern Queens. On November 11, 1938, construction began on an upgrade to the north end of the boulevard, in order to serve as a link between the Bronx–Whitestone Bridge and the 1939 New York World's Fair. The overhauled boulevard was reopened between the bridge and Horace Harding Boulevard (then called World's Fair Boulevard; now the Long Island Expressway) a year later on November 16, 1939, at which point it was renamed Francis Lewis Boulevard. At this time, the remaining original stretch of Cross Island Boulevard in Whitestone was renamed Clintonville Street, although many signs continued to identify it as Cross Island Boulevard. The southern section of Francis Lewis Boulevard, meanwhile, consisted of narrow roads with macadam construction. Improvements to the southern leg of the boulevard were in the preliminary stages at this time.

In 1940, the city planned to connect the two sections of the boulevard, by cutting through Cunningham Park. Construction on the spur began in 1941. The road was completed in June 1943, but did not open due to restrictions by the New York City Police Department, which required lights to be installed along the route. Materials to install the lights were restricted by the World War II efforts. In spite of restrictions, many motorists utilized the stretch illegally. The connection was opened in June 1946. The link provided a direct route from Southeast Queens to the Whitestone Bridge for trucks and other commercial traffic, which could not use the Cross Island Parkway.

== Transportation ==
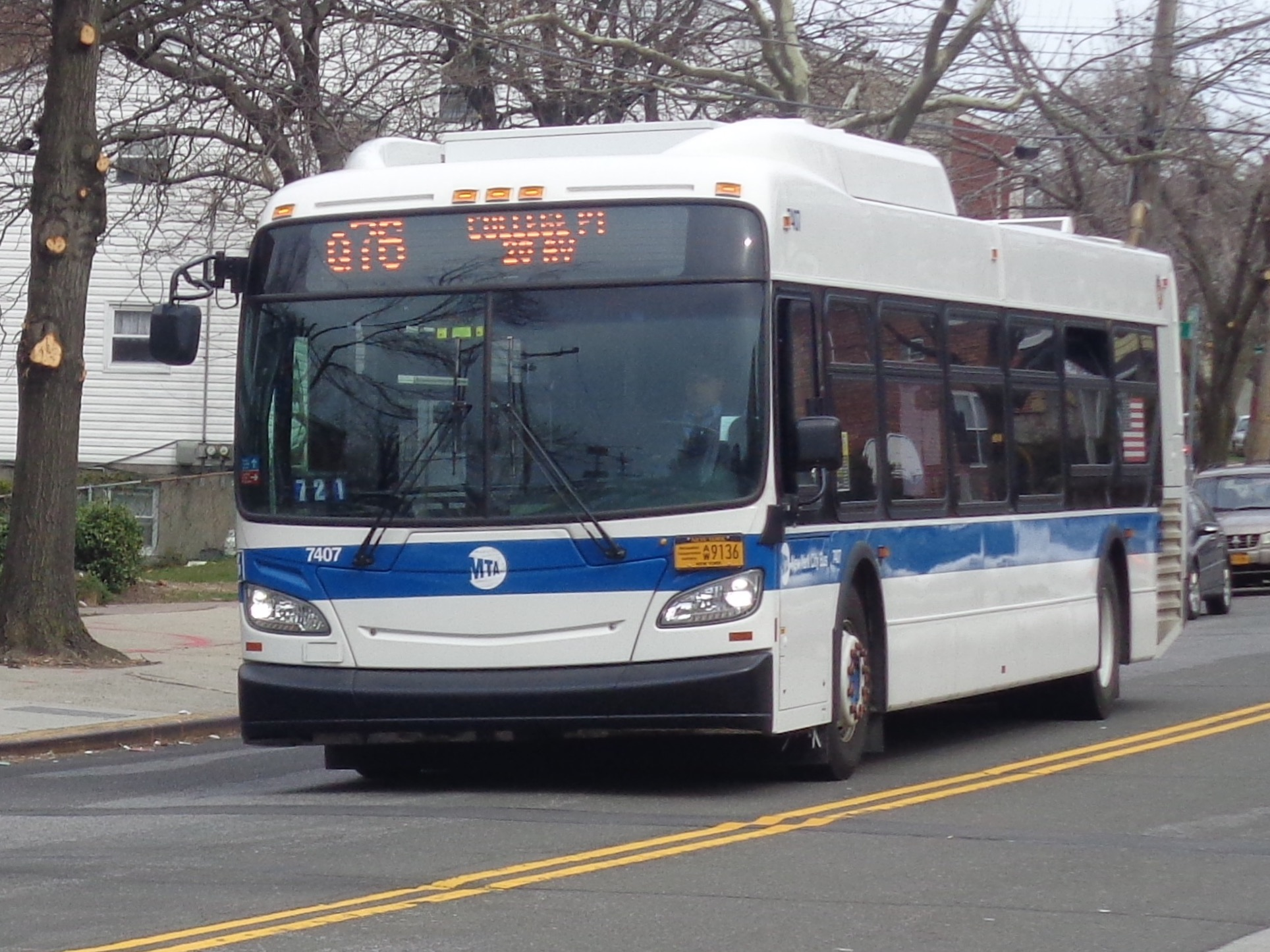
A Q76 bus in Whitestone

Francis Lewis Boulevard has two main bus lines:

- The Q76 runs on Francis Lewis between Hillside Avenue in Hollis and the Cross Island Parkway in Whitestone. It runs through the Holliswood, Cunningham Park, Bayside, and Whitestone sections of the street.
- The Q77 runs on the stretch between Hillside Avenue and Springfield Boulevard, and goes through the Hollis, St. Albans, and Springfield Gardens sections of Francis Lewis. Service is shared with the n6/n6X, n24, and select n1 buses until Jamaica Avenue, where they head east.

Other bus lines include the following:

- The Q61 bus runs between the Cross Island Parkway and Willets Point Boulevard.
- The Q16 bus runs between 29th and 26th Avenues.
- The Q28 bus runs between 32nd and Crocheron Avenues.
- The Cambria Heights-bound Q27 runs from Springfield Boulevard to 120th Avenue, where it terminates.
- Ozone Park-bound Q51 buses run from 118th Avenue to Linden Boulevard.
- From two different Rosedale terminals heading to Jamaica, the Q85 and Q86 run from 246th Street to Sunrise Highway with Q86 service extended to Brookville Boulevard in both directions. Southbound Q86 service diverts at Sunrise Highway and shares this portion with weekend Q5 service overnight.
- The Q111 runs on the boulevard south of 147th Avenue. Most buses terminate at Hook Creek Boulevard, but two trips continue towards Cedarhurst in Nassau County during rush hours: one to Cedarhurst in the morning and one to Jamaica in the afternoon.
- In Rosedale, the boulevard is served by the QM63 express bus south of 249th Street, and heads west on 149th Avenue, which operates during rush hours only. This route was previously served by the Q5S shuttle bus, a spur of the current Q5 route, which has since been discontinued.
- The Q26 uses the corridor from 58th Avenue to Hollis Court Boulevard to change its direction from Fresh Meadows to College Point.

== Education ==
Two major Catholic high schools in New York City, St. Francis Preparatory School and Holy Cross High School, are located on Francis Lewis Boulevard. St. Francis Preparatory is located at the intersection with Horace Harding Expressway, whereas Holy Cross is located near the intersection with 26th Avenue. Every year the two schools play a football game in the beginning of the season called the "Battle of the Boulevard", in reference to the shared stretch of road.

== Major intersections ==
The entire route is in the New York City borough of Queens.

Location	mi	km	Destinations	Notes
Rosedale	0.0	0.0	Hook Creek Boulevard	Southern terminus
Rosedale	0.9	1.4	NY 27 (South Conduit Avenue / Sunrise Highway) to Belt Parkway west	
Rosedale	1.0	1.6	Brookville Boulevard to Cross Island Parkway north	
Laurelton	1.8	2.9	Merrick Boulevard	Former NY 27A
Cambria Heights	3.4	5.5	Springfield Boulevard	
Cambria Heights	3.6	5.8	Linden Boulevard	
Hollis–Queens Village line	4.9	7.9	Jamaica Avenue	
Jamaica Estates	5.5	8.9	NY 25 (Hillside Avenue)	
Cunningham Park	5.9– 6.2	9.5– 10.0	Grand Central Parkway – Throgs Neck Bridge, Eastern Long Island, RFK Bridge	Cloverleaf interchange; exits 20A-B on Grand Central Parkway
Cunningham Park	6.3	10.1	Cunningham Park	Interchange
Cunningham Park	6.4	10.3	Union Turnpike	Former NY 25C
Fresh Meadows	7.3	11.7	I-495 (Long Island Expressway) – Eastern Long Island, Midtown Tunnel	Exits 26–28 on I-495
Auburndale	8.3	13.4	NY 25A (Northern Boulevard)	
Auburndale	9.3	15.0	Utopia Parkway	
Whitestone	10.8	17.4	Cross Island Parkway north	Northern terminus
1.000 mi = 1.609 km; 1.000 km = 0.621 mi

== Gallery ==
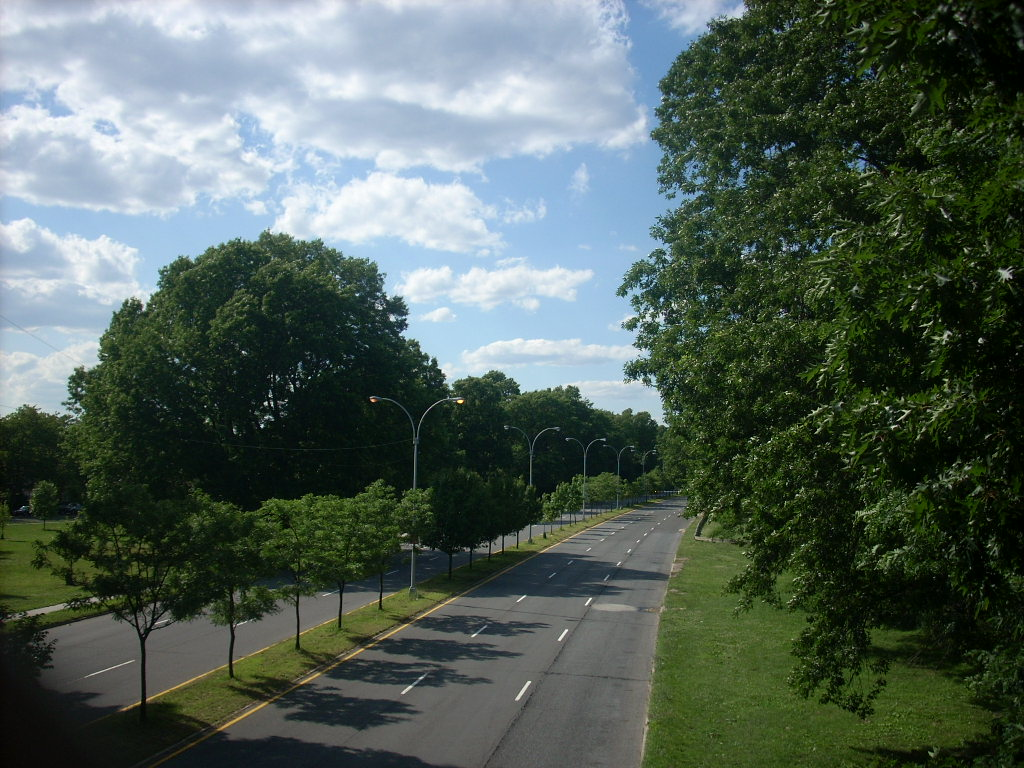
From the former Long Island Motor Parkway bridge

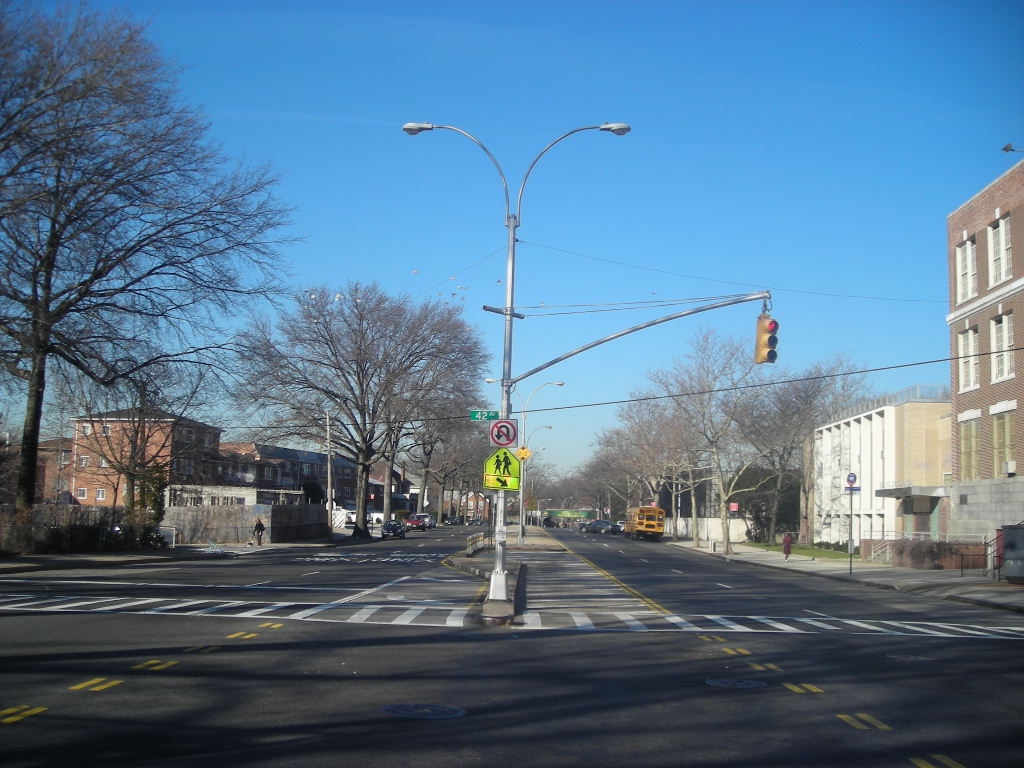
At 42nd Avenue in Bayside

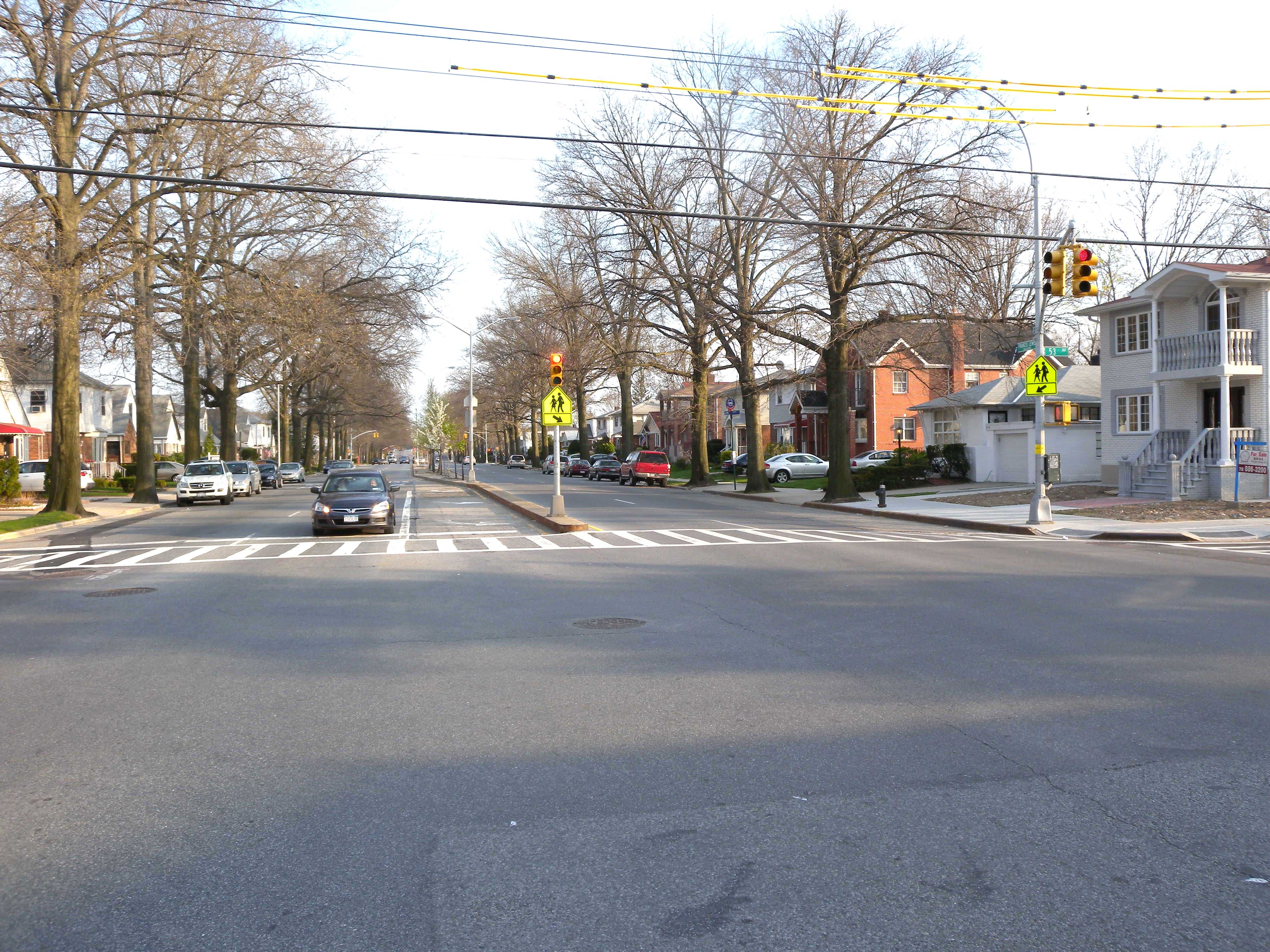
At 53rd Avenue, Oakland Gardens

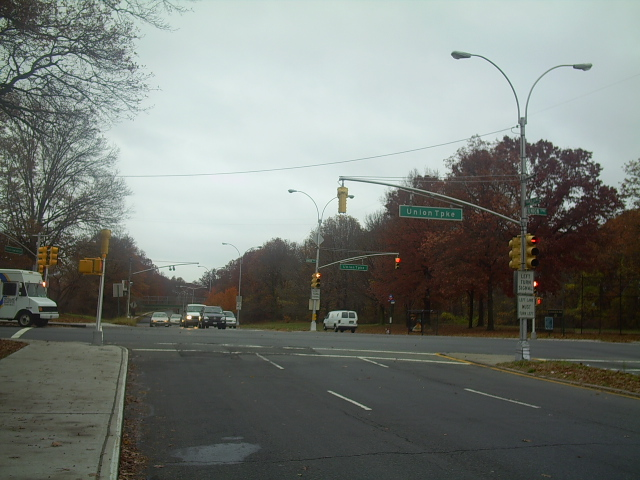
At Union Turnpike, Fresh Meadows

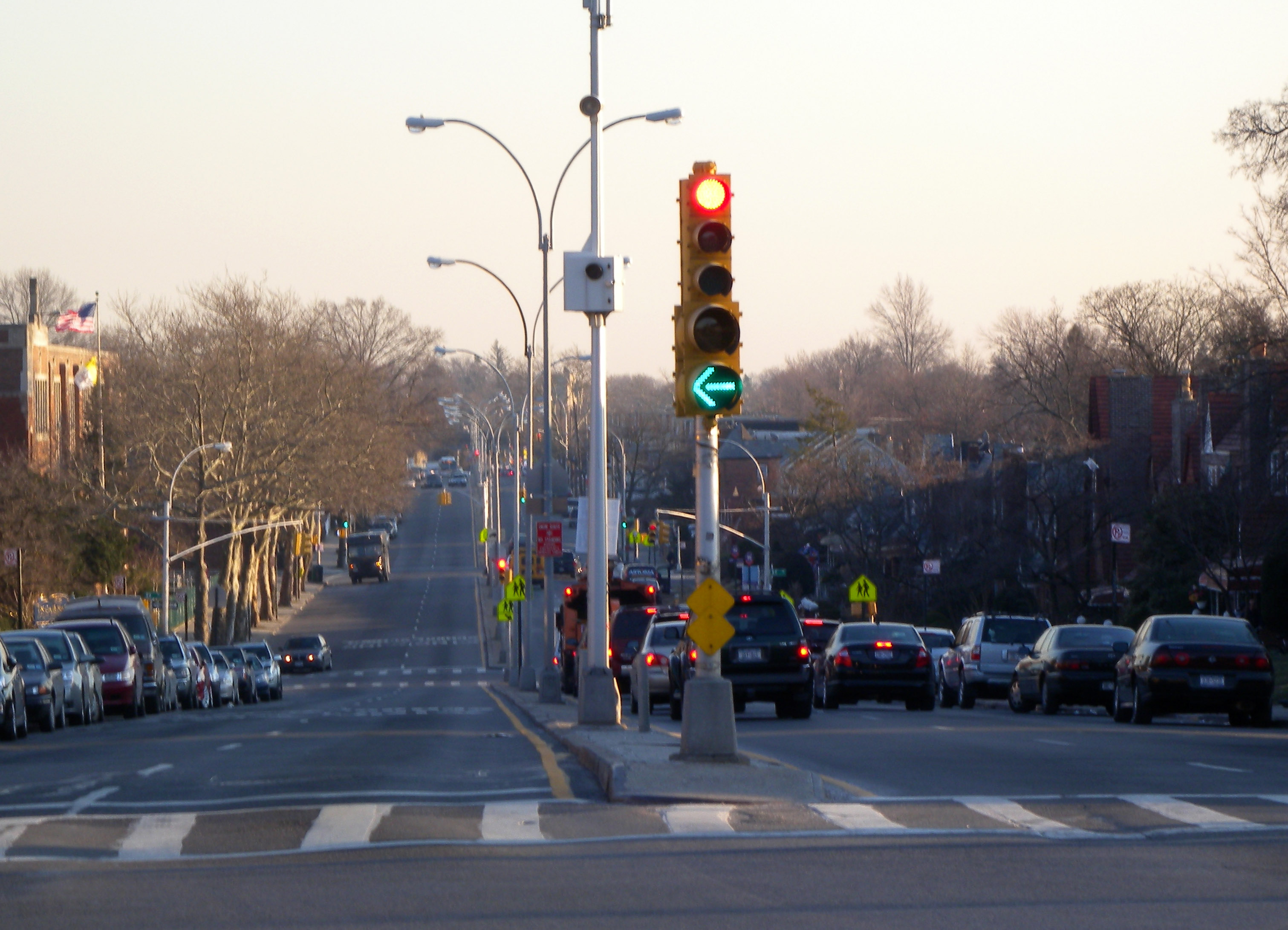
At Hillside Avenue in Hollis

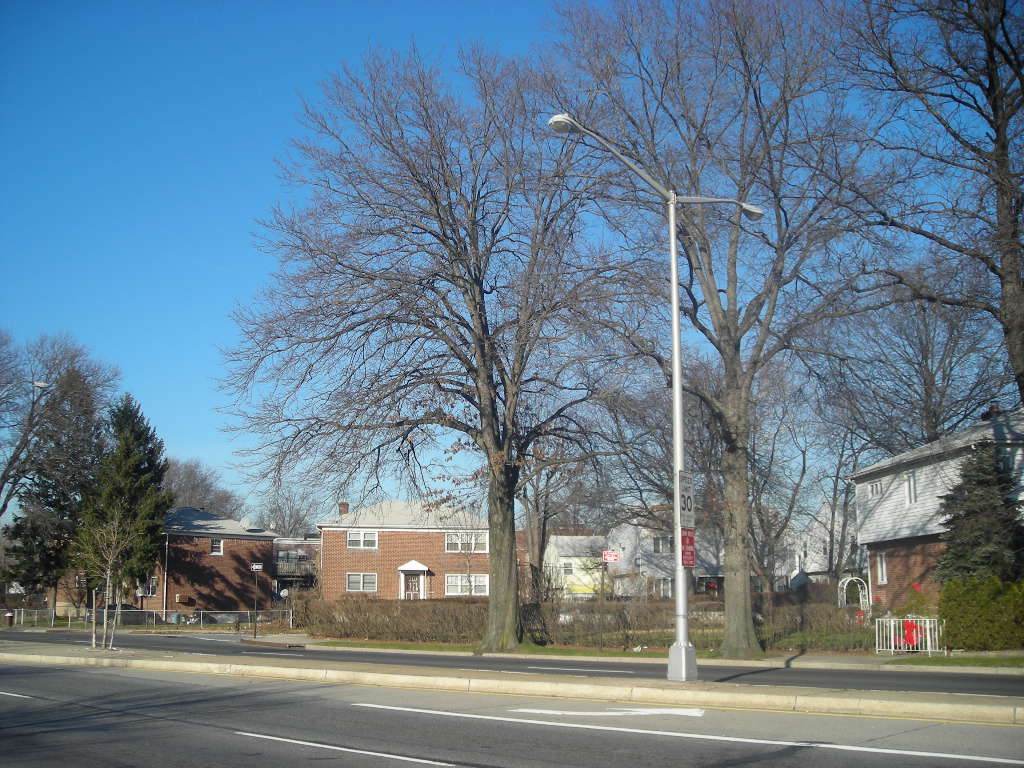
In Whitestone
