= Lists of bus routes in New York City =

The list of bus routes in New York City has been split by borough:

- List of bus routes in Manhattan
- List of bus routes in Brooklyn
- List of bus routes in the Bronx
- List of bus routes in Queens
- List of bus routes in Staten Island

There is also a list of express bus routes:

- List of express bus routes in New York City

== See also ==
- List of bus routes in Nassau County, New York
- List of bus routes in Suffolk County, New York
- List of bus routes in Westchester County
- Lists of New Jersey Transit bus routes
