= List of bus routes in Queens =

Bus routes in New York City

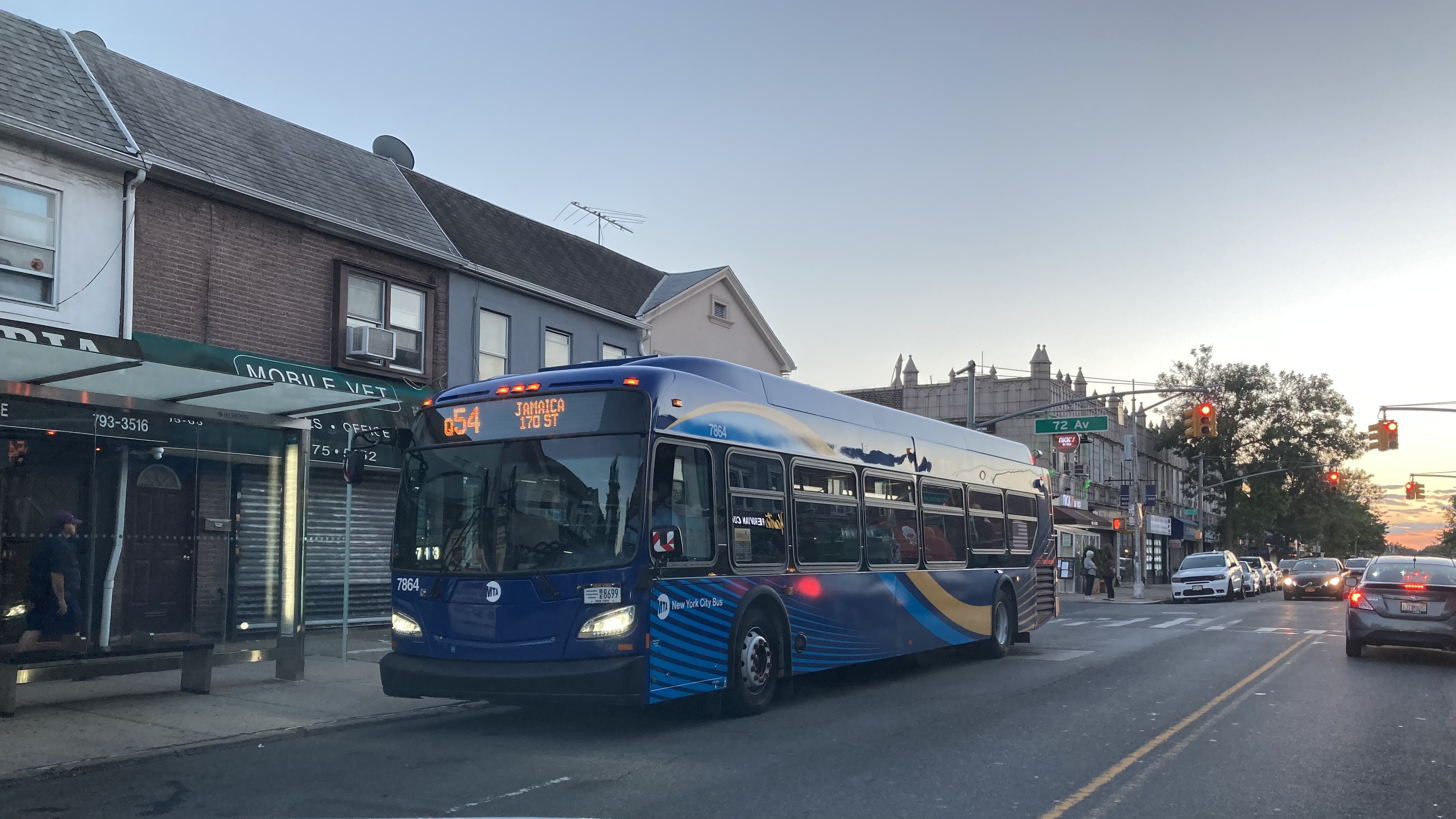
A New Flyer XD40 bus on the Jamaica-bound Q54 at Metropolitan/72nd Avenues in Forest Hills

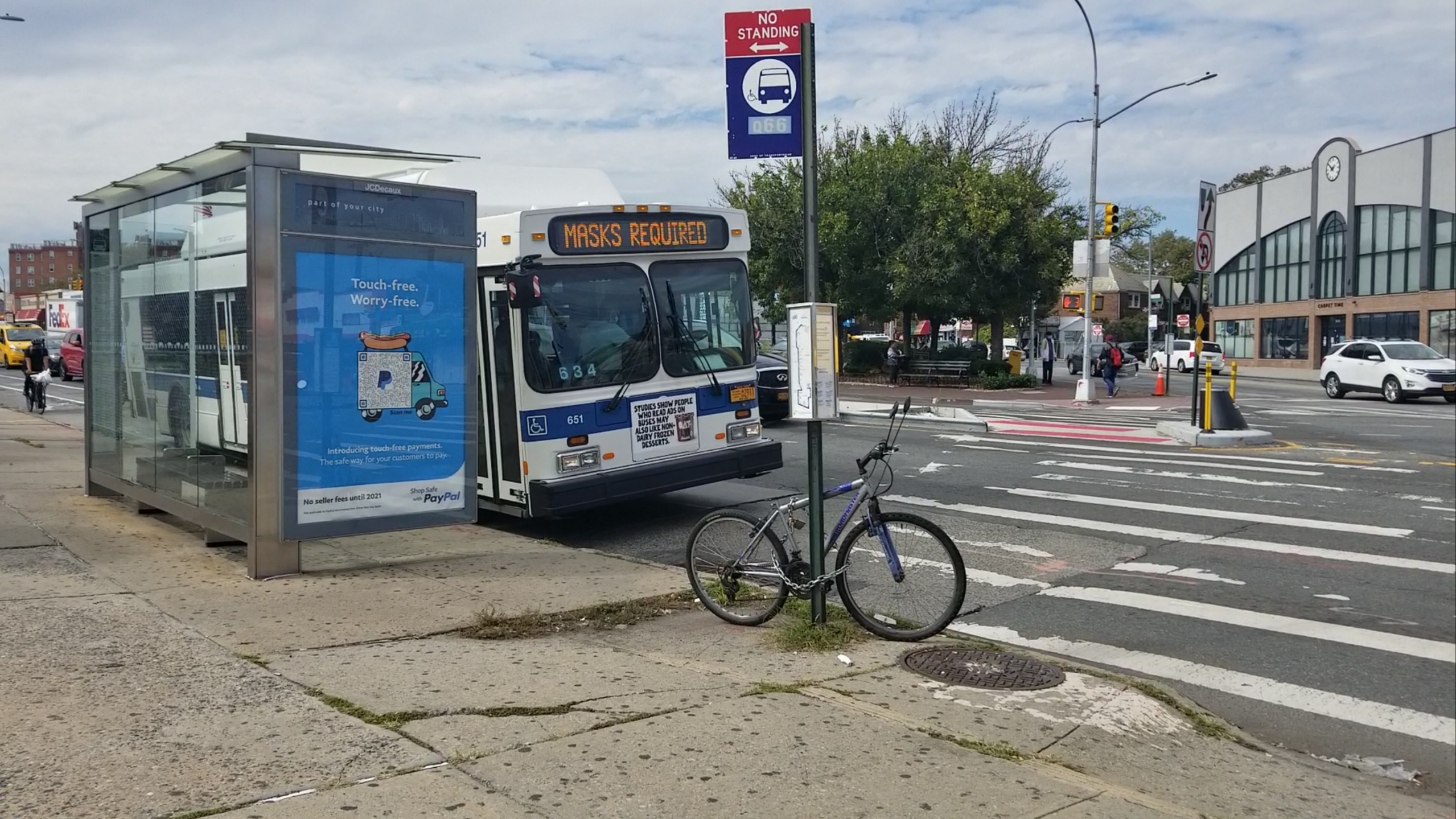
A New Flyer C40LF bus on the Q66 at an old-style bus stop with Guide-A-Ride in Woodside, Queens

The Metropolitan Transportation Authority (MTA) operates a number of bus routes in Queens, New York, United States, under two different public brands. New York City Transit Authority and MTA Regional Bus Operations. Some of them are the direct descendants of streetcar lines (see list of streetcar lines in Queens).

== List of current routes (effective August 31, 2025) ==
This table gives details for the routes prefixed with "Q"—in other words, those considered to run primarily in Queens by the MTA. For details on routes with other prefixes, see the following articles:

- List of bus routes in Brooklyn: B13, B15, B20, B24, B26, B32, B38, B52, B54, B57, B62, B94, B111, M90, T403, T410
- List of bus routes in Manhattan: M60 Select Bus Service
- List of bus routes in Nassau County, New York: n1, n4, n4X, n6, n6X, n20G, n20X, n22, n22X, n24, n26, n31, n31X, n32, n33
- List of express bus routes in New York City: QM1, QM2, QM4, QM5, QM6, QM7, QM8, QM10, QM11, QM12, QM15, QM16, QM17, QM18, QM20, QM21, QM24, QM25, QM31, QM32, QM34, QM35, QM36, QM40, QM42, QM44, QM63, QM64, QM65, QM68, BM5

Each route is marked with the operator. Routes marked with an asterisk (*) run 24 hours a day. The full route is shown except for branching. Connections to New York City Subway stations at the bus routes' terminals are also listed where applicable. For rush routes, streets with limited-stop sections are notated in italics.

=== Q1 to Q25 ===
Route	Operator	Terminals			Streets Traveled	Route type	Notes
Q1*	NYCT	Jamaica; Jamaica Avenue and Sutphin Boulevard at Sutphin Boulevard–Archer Avenue–JFK Airport ( trains), Jamaica LIRR station and AirTrain JFK	↔	Bellerose; 243rd Street and Braddock Avenue	All trips: Hillside Avenue, Bellerose trips: Braddock Avenue	Local	
Q1*	NYCT	Jamaica; Jamaica Avenue and Sutphin Boulevard at Sutphin Boulevard–Archer Avenue–JFK Airport ( trains), Jamaica LIRR station and AirTrain JFK	↔	Queens Village; Springfield Boulevard and Hillside Avenue	All trips: Hillside Avenue, Bellerose trips: Braddock Avenue	Local	Alternate daytime service.
Q2*	NYCT	Jamaica; 168th Street Bus Terminal	↔	Elmont, Nassau County; UBS Arena/Belmont Park	Hillside Avenue, Hollis Avenue	Rush	Local service on Hillside Avenue provided by Q1, Q3, and Q76.
Q3*	NYCT	Jamaica; 168th Street Bus Terminal	↔	JFK International Airport; Lefferts Boulevard; AirTrain JFK at Lefferts Boulevard station	Hillside Avenue, Farmers Boulevard	Local	
Q4*	NYCT	Jamaica; Parsons Boulevard and Archer Avenue at Jamaica Center–York College ( trains)	↔	Cambria Heights; 235th Street and Linden Boulevard	Archer Avenue, Merrick Boulevard, Linden Boulevard	Rush	Local service on Merrick Boulevard provided by Q5.
Q5*	NYCT	Jamaica; Parsons Boulevard and Archer Avenue at Jamaica Center–York College ( trains)	↔	Laurelton; Laurelton Parkway and Merrick Boulevard	All trips: Merrick Boulevard, Laurelton trips: 233rd Street, 133rd Avenue; Green Acres/Rosedale trips: Hook Creek Boulevard, Sunrise Highway	Local	
Q5*	NYCT	Jamaica; Parsons Boulevard and Archer Avenue at Jamaica Center–York College ( trains)	↔	Valley Stream, Nassau County; Green Acres Shopping Mall	All trips: Merrick Boulevard, Laurelton trips: 233rd Street, 133rd Avenue; Green Acres/Rosedale trips: Hook Creek Boulevard, Sunrise Highway	Local	Weekend daytime service.
Q5*	NYCT	Jamaica; Parsons Boulevard and Archer Avenue at Jamaica Center–York College ( trains)	↔	Rosedale; Sunrise Highway and Francis Lewis Boulevard at Rosedale LIRR station	All trips: Merrick Boulevard, Laurelton trips: 233rd Street, 133rd Avenue; Green Acres/Rosedale trips: Hook Creek Boulevard, Sunrise Highway	Local	Weekend overnight service.
Q6*	MTA Bus	Jamaica; 168th Street Bus Terminal	↔	JFK International Airport; North Cargo Road and Eastern Road at USPS Airport Mail Facility	Jamaica Avenue, Sutphin Boulevard, Rockaway Boulevard	Local	
Q7*	MTA Bus	Woodhaven; Jamaica Avenue and Elderts Lane at 75th Street–Elderts Lane ( trains)	↔	JFK International Airport; 148th Street and 147th Avenue at JFK Travel Plaza	Rockaway Boulevard	Local	
Q8	MTA Bus	Jamaica; 168th Street Bus Terminal	↔	Spring Creek, Brooklyn; Gateway Center Mall	All trips: Jamaica Avenue, 101st Avenue, Gateway Mall trips: Fountain Avenue	Local	Bus stops and travel path in Brooklyn subject to change with Brooklyn Bus Network Redesign.
Q8	MTA Bus	Jamaica; 168th Street Bus Terminal	↔	East New York, Brooklyn; Euclid Avenue and Pitkin Avenue at Euclid Avenue ( trains)	All trips: Jamaica Avenue, 101st Avenue, Gateway Mall trips: Fountain Avenue	Local	Alternate weekday service during the day.
Q9	MTA Bus	Jamaica; 168th Street Bus Terminal	↔	South Ozone Park; Rockaway Boulevard and Lincoln Street	Jamaica Avenue, Sutphin Boulevard, Liberty Avenue, Van Wyck Expressway Service Road South/135th Street, Lincoln Street	Rush	Local service on Sutphin Boulevard provided by Q41 and Q60.; Local service on Liberty Avenue provided by Q112.
Q10*	MTA Bus	Kew Gardens; Union Turnpike and Kew Gardens Road at Kew Gardens–Union Turnpike ( trains)	↔	JFK International Airport; Lefferts Boulevard at AirTrain JFK Lefferts Boulevard station	Lefferts Boulevard, Rockaway Boulevard, 130th Street, Pan Am Road	Rush	Local service on Lefferts Boulevard provided by Q80.
Q11*	MTA Bus	Elmhurst; Queens Boulevard and Woodhaven Boulevard at Woodhaven Boulevard ( trains) and Queens Center Mall	↔	Howard Beach; 157th Avenue and Cross Bay Boulevard	All trips: Woodhaven Boulevard, Cross Bay Boulevard, 165th Avenue trips: 157th Avenue, 104th Street, 99th Street	Local	
Q11*	MTA Bus	Elmhurst; Queens Boulevard and Woodhaven Boulevard at Woodhaven Boulevard ( trains) and Queens Center Mall	↔	Old Howard Beach; 165th Avenue and 96th Street at Charles Park	All trips: Woodhaven Boulevard, Cross Bay Boulevard, 165th Avenue trips: 157th Avenue, 104th Street, 99th Street	Local	Operates via Hamilton Beach in both directions.; No overnight service.
Q11*	MTA Bus	Elmhurst; Queens Boulevard and Woodhaven Boulevard at Woodhaven Boulevard ( trains) and Queens Center Mall	↔	Ozone Park; Pitkin Avenue and Cross Bay Boulevard	All trips: Woodhaven Boulevard, Cross Bay Boulevard, 165th Avenue trips: 157th Avenue, 104th Street, 99th Street	Local	Weekday rush hour and evening service only.
Q12*	NYCT	Flushing; Roosevelt Avenue and Main Street at Flushing–Main Street ( trains)	↔	Little Neck; Glenwood Street and Northern Boulevard	Northern Boulevard	Local	
Q13	NYCT	Flushing; Roosevelt Avenue and Main Street at Flushing–Main Street ( trains)	↔	Fort Totten; Fort Road and Cross Island Parkway	Sanford Avenue, Northern Boulevard, Bell Boulevard	Rush	Local service on Sanford Avenue provided by Q65.; Local service on Northern Boulevard provided by Q12.
Q14	NYCT	Ridgewood; Forest Avenue and Fairview Avenue at Forest Avenue ( train)	↔	East Elmhurst; 31st Avenue and 102nd Street	Forest Avenue, Eliot Avenue, 99th Street, 103rd Street/104th and 102nd Streets	Local	
Q15	NYCT	Flushing; Roosevelt Avenue and Main Street at Flushing–Main Street ( trains)	↔	Beechhurst; 166th Street and Powells Cove Boulevard	41st Avenue, 150th Street, 10th Avenue, Powells Cove Boulevard	Local	
Q16	NYCT	Flushing; Roosevelt Avenue and Main Street at Flushing–Main Street ( trains)	↔	Fort Totten; Fort Road and Cross Island Parkway	Union Street, Bayside Avenue, 29th Avenue, Utopia Parkway	Local	
Q17*	NYCT	Flushing; Roosevelt Avenue and Main Street at Flushing–Main Street ( trains)	↔	Jamaica; Archer Avenue and Merrick Boulevard	All trips: Kissena Boulevard, Horace Harding Expressway, Jamaica trips: 188th Street	Local	
Q17*	NYCT	Flushing; Roosevelt Avenue and Main Street at Flushing–Main Street ( trains)	↔	Fresh Meadows; 188th Street and Horace Harding Expressway	All trips: Kissena Boulevard, Horace Harding Expressway, Jamaica trips: 188th Street	Local	Select weekday service during the day.
Q18	MTA Bus	Astoria; 2nd Street and 26th Avenue	↔	Maspeth; 69th Street and Grand Avenue	30th Avenue, 58th Street, Woodside Avenue, 65th Place, 69th Street	Local	
Q19	MTA Bus	Astoria; 2nd Street and 26th Avenue	↔	Flushing; Main Street and Roosevelt Avenue at Flushing–Main Street ( trains)	Astoria Boulevard	Local	
Q20*	NYCT	College Point; College Point Boulevard and 15th Avenue	↔	Jamaica; Merrick Boulevard and Archer Avenue	20th Avenue, Union Street, Main Street	Local	
Q22	MTA Bus	Rockaway Park; Beach 116th Street and Newport Avenue at Rockaway Park–Beach 116th Street station ( trains)	↔	Far Rockaway; Nameoke Street and Redfern Avenue at Far Rockaway LIRR station	All trips: Rockaway Beach Boulevard, Beach Channel Drive, Seagirt Boulevard, Bayswater trips: Mott Avenue	Local	Two daily trips in each direction loop around to Bayswater before terminating or after originating at Far Rockaway.
Q23*	MTA Bus	East Elmhurst; Ditmars Boulevard and 102nd Street	↔	Glendale; Union Turnpike opposite Forest View Crescent Apartments	Ditmars Boulevard, 108th Street, 69th Avenue	Local	
Q24*	NYCT	Jamaica; 89th Avenue and Parsons Boulevard at Parsons Boulevard ( trains)	↔	Bedford–Stuyvesant, Brooklyn; Patchen Avenue and Broadway at Kosciuszko Street ( train)	All trips: Atlantic Avenue, Bed-Stuy trips: Broadway	Local	Bus stops and travel path in Brooklyn subject to change with Brooklyn Bus Network Redesign. Service between Patchen Avenue and Broadway Junction is slated to be replaced with future B53 service.
Q24*	NYCT	Jamaica; 89th Avenue and Parsons Boulevard at Parsons Boulevard ( trains)	↔	East New York, Brooklyn; Broadway and Fulton Street at Broadway Junction ( trains)	All trips: Atlantic Avenue, Bed-Stuy trips: Broadway	Local	Alternate Saturday daytime service.
Q25*	MTA Bus	College Point; Poppenhusen Avenue and 119th Street	↔	Jamaica; Archer Avenue and Sutphin Boulevard at Sutphin Boulevard–Archer Avenue–JFK Airport ( trains), Jamaica LIRR station and AirTrain JFK	127th Street, Kissena Boulevard, Parsons Boulevard	Local	

=== Q26 to Q50 ===
Route	Operator	Terminals			Streets Traveled	Route type	Notes
Q26*	MTA Bus	College Point; 14th Avenue and 110th Street	↔	Fresh Meadows; Francis Lewis Boulevard and Hollis Court Boulevard	All trips: College Point Boulevard, Fresh Meadows trips: Sanford Avenue, Parsons Boulevard, 46th Avenue, Hollis Court Boulevard	Local	
Q26*	MTA Bus	College Point; 14th Avenue and 110th Street	↔	Flushing; Main Street and Roosevelt Avenue at Flushing–Main Street ( trains)	All trips: College Point Boulevard, Fresh Meadows trips: Sanford Avenue, Parsons Boulevard, 46th Avenue, Hollis Court Boulevard	Local	Overnight terminal.
Q27*	NYCT	Flushing; 39th Avenue and Union Street at Flushing–Main Street ( trains)	↔	Cambria Heights; Francis Lewis Boulevard and 120th Avenue	Sanford Avenue, Parsons Boulevard, 46th, 47th and 48th Avenues, Springfield Boulevard	Rush*	Local service along Parsons Boulevard and 46th Avenue provided by Q26 days and evenings.; Overnight service runs local.
Q28*	MTA Bus	Flushing; 39th Avenue and Union Street at Flushing–Main Street ( trains)	↔	Bay Terrace Shopping Center	Northern Boulevard, Crocheron Avenue, 32nd Avenue, Corporal Kennedy Street	Rush	Local service on Northern Boulevard provided by Q12.
Q29	NYCT	Glendale; 81st Street and Myrtle Avenue	↔	Jackson Heights; 82nd Street and Roosevelt Avenue at 82nd Street–Jackson Heights ( train)	All trips: 80th Street, Dry Harbor Road, Jackson Heights trips: 90th/92nd Streets	Local	
Q29	NYCT	Glendale; 81st Street and Myrtle Avenue	→ AM	Elmhurst; Queens Boulevard and Woodhaven Boulevard at Woodhaven Boulevard ( trains) and Queens Center Mall	All trips: 80th Street, Dry Harbor Road, Jackson Heights trips: 90th/92nd Streets	Local	Alternate morning rush terminal.
Q30	NYCT	Jamaica; Archer Avenue and Sutphin Boulevard at Sutphin Boulevard–Archer Avenue–JFK Airport ( trains), Jamaica LIRR station and AirTrain JFK	↔	Little Neck; Little Neck Parkway and Nassau Boulevard	Homelawn Street, Utopia Parkway, Horace Harding Expressway	Rush	Local service on Homelawn Street/Utopia Parkway provided by Q31.
Q31	NYCT	Jamaica; Archer Avenue and Sutphin Boulevard at Sutphin Boulevard–Archer Avenue–JFK Airport ( trains), Jamaica LIRR station and AirTrain JFK	↔	Bay Terrace; Shopping Center	Homelawn Street, Utopia Parkway, 47th and 48th Avenues, Bell Boulevard	Local	
Q32	MTA Bus	Penn Station, Midtown Manhattan; West 32nd Street and 7th Avenue	↔	Jackson Heights; Northern Boulevard and 81st Street	Madison Avenue/Fifth Avenue (Manhattan), Queens Boulevard, Roosevelt Avenue	Local	Travels between Manhattan and Queens via the Queensboro Bridge.
Q33*	MTA Bus	Jackson Heights; Jackson Heights–Roosevelt Avenue/74th Street ( trains)	↔	LaGuardia Airport; Marine Air Terminal	82nd/83rd Streets	Local	
Q35*	MTA Bus	Midwood, Brooklyn; Avenue H and Flatbush Avenue at Flatbush Avenue ( trains)	↔	Rockaway Park; Beach Channel Drive and Beach 108th Street at Scholars Academy	Flatbush Avenue, Beach Channel Drive, Rockaway Beach Boulevard	Rush*	Local service on Flatbush Avenue provided by B41.; Summer service operates via Jacob Riis Park during daytime and evenings.; Travels between Brooklyn and Queens via the Marine Parkway–Gil Hodges Memorial Bridge.; Overnight service runs local.
Q36	NYCT	Little Neck; 40th Avenue and Little Neck Parkway at Little Neck LIRR Station	↔	Jamaica; 168th Street Bus Terminal	All trips: Little Neck Parkway, Jericho Turnpike/Jamaica Avenue, Jamaica trips: Springfield Boulevard, Hillside Avenue	Rush	Local service on Hillside Avenue provided by Q1, Q3, and Q76.
Q36	NYCT	Little Neck; 40th Avenue and Little Neck Parkway at Little Neck LIRR Station	↔	Queens Village; Springfield Boulevard and Jamaica Avenue at Queens Village LIRR station	All trips: Little Neck Parkway, Jericho Turnpike/Jamaica Avenue, Jamaica trips: Springfield Boulevard, Hillside Avenue	Rush	Early morning and morning rush origin.; Evening rush and late evening terminal.
Q37	MTA Bus	Kew Gardens; Union Turnpike and Kew Gardens Road at Kew Gardens–Union Turnpike ( trains)	↔	South Ozone Park; 135th Road and 131st Street	Park Lane South, 111th Street, Aqueduct Racetrack trips: Aqueduct Road, then: 135th Avenue	Local	Aqueduct served after 7 a.m. by South Ozone Park-bound buses and after 9 a.m. by Kew Gardens-bound buses.; Alternate weekday rush hour buses bypass Aqueduct and are labeled Q37B.
Q38	NYCT	Middle Village; Metropolitan Avenue and Fresh Pond Road	↔	Rego Park; 62nd Drive and 108th Street	Metropolitan Avenue, Juniper Valley Road, Penelope Avenue, 63rd Drive, 63rd Road/62nd Drive	Local	
Q39*	NYCT	Long Island City; 28th Street and Queens Plaza South at Queensboro Plaza ( trains) and Queens Plaza ( trains)	↔	Glendale; Cooper Avenue and 60th Lane	48th Avenue, 58th Street, Forest Avenue	Local	
Q40	MTA Bus	Jamaica; Sutphin Boulevard and Hillside Avenue at Sutphin Boulevard ( train)	↔	South Jamaica; 135th Avenue and 143rd Street	Sutphin Boulevard, Lakewood Avenue, 142nd and 143rd Streets	Rush	Local service on Sutphin Boulevard provided by Q6, Q41, and Q60.; Local service on Lakewood Avenue provided by Q41.
Q41	MTA Bus	Jamaica; 168th Street Bus Terminal	↔	Howard Beach; 164th Avenue and 92nd Street	Sutphin Boulevard, Lakewood Avenue, 109th Avenue, Cross Bay Boulevard	Local	
Q41	MTA Bus	Jamaica; 168th Street Bus Terminal	→	Howard Beach; 160th Avenue and 92nd Street	Sutphin Boulevard, Lakewood Avenue, 109th Avenue, Cross Bay Boulevard	Local	Select extended trips via 84th Street.
Q42	NYCT	Jamaica; Parsons Boulevard and Archer Avenue at Jamaica Center–York College ( trains)	↔	Addisleigh Park; Sayres Avenue and 180th Street	Liberty Avenue, 174th Street, Sayres Avenue	Local	No weekend service.
Q43*	NYCT	Jamaica; Archer Avenue and Sutphin Boulevard at Sutphin Boulevard–Archer Avenue–JFK Airport ( trains), Jamaica LIRR station and AirTrain JFK	↔	Floral Park; 268th Street and Hillside Avenue	Hillside Avenue	Rush	Local service on Hillside Avenue provided by Q1, Q3, and Q76.
Q44*	NYCT	Jamaica; Merrick Boulevard and Archer Avenue	↔	West Farms, Bronx; East 180th Street and Boston Road near Bronx Zoo and West Farms Square–East Tremont Avenue ( trains)	All trips: Archer Avenue, Main Street; Non-Flushing trips: Parsons Boulevard; Bronx Zoo trips: East 177th Street (Cross Bronx Expressway service road)	Select Bus Service	Local service on Main Street provided by Q20.; Travels between Queens and the Bronx via the Whitestone Bridge.
Q44*	NYCT	Jamaica; Merrick Boulevard and Archer Avenue	→ AM	Whitestone; Parsons Boulevard and 14th Avenue	All trips: Archer Avenue, Main Street; Non-Flushing trips: Parsons Boulevard; Bronx Zoo trips: East 177th Street (Cross Bronx Expressway service road)	Select Bus Service	Select morning rush terminal
Q44*	NYCT	Jamaica; Merrick Boulevard and Archer Avenue	→ AM	Flushing; Main Street and 38th Avenue near Flushing–Main Street ( trains)	All trips: Archer Avenue, Main Street; Non-Flushing trips: Parsons Boulevard; Bronx Zoo trips: East 177th Street (Cross Bronx Expressway service road)	Select Bus Service	Select early morning terminal from Jamaica.; Select early morning origin to Bronx Zoo.
Q45*	NYCT	Kew Gardens; Queens Boulevard and 78th Avenue at Kew Gardens–Union Turnpike ( trains)	↔	Fresh Meadows; 188th Street and 64th Avenue	Union Turnpike, 188th Street	Local	
Q46*	NYCT	Kew Gardens; Queens Boulevard and 78th Avenue at Kew Gardens–Union Turnpike ( trains)	↔	Lake Success, Nassau County; Long Island Jewish Medical Center	Union Turnpike	Rush	Local service on Union Turnpike west of 188th Street provided by Q45.
Q47	MTA Bus	East Elmhurst; 95th Street and Ditmars Boulevard	↔	Glendale; The Shops at Atlas Park	74th/75th Streets, 69th Street, 80th Street	Local	
Q48	NYCT	Kew Gardens; Queens Boulevard and 78th Avenue at Kew Gardens–Union Turnpike ( trains)	↔	Glen Oaks; 260th Street and Little Neck Parkway	Union Turnpike, 260th Street	Rush	Local service on Union Turnpike west of 188th Street provided by Q45.; No weekend service.
Q49	MTA Bus	Jackson Heights; Jackson Heights–Roosevelt Avenue/74th Street ( trains)	↔	East Elmhurst; 31st Avenue and 102nd Street	35th Avenue, 89th/90th Streets, Astoria Boulevard	Local	
Q50*	MTA Bus	Flushing; Main Street and 39th Avenue near Flushing–Main Street ( trains)	↔	Pelham Bay, Bronx; Westchester Avenue and Bruckner Boulevard at Pelham Bay Park ( trains)	All trips: Whitestone Expressway, Hutchinson River Parkway, Bruckner Boulevard; Co-op City trips: Co-op City Boulevard	Limited	
Q50*	MTA Bus	Flushing; Main Street and 39th Avenue near Flushing–Main Street ( trains)	↔	Co-op City, Bronx; Earhart Lane and Erskine Place	All trips: Whitestone Expressway, Hutchinson River Parkway, Bruckner Boulevard; Co-op City trips: Co-op City Boulevard	Limited	Early morning and rush hour weekday service only.

=== Q51 to Q77 ===
Route	Operator	Terminals			Streets Traveled	Route type	Notes
Q51	MTA Bus	Ozone Park; Rockaway Boulevard and Liberty Avenue at Rockaway Boulevard ( train)	↔	Cambria Heights; Linden Boulevard and Francis Lewis Boulevard	Rockaway Boulevard, Linden Boulevard	Limited	Local service on Linden Boulevard provided by Q4.
Q52	MTA Bus	Elmhurst; Queens Boulevard and Woodhaven Boulevard at Woodhaven Boulevard ( trains) and Queens Center Mall	↔	Edgemere; Beach 50th Street and Beach Channel Drive	Woodhaven Boulevard, Cross Bay Boulevard, Rockaway Beach Boulevard	Select Bus Service	Local service on Woodhaven Boulevard provided by Q11.
Q53*	MTA Bus	Woodside; 61st Street and Roosevelt Avenue at 61st Street–Woodside subway ( trains) and Woodside LIRR station	↔	Rockaway Park; Beach 116th Street at Rockaway Park–Beach 116th Street station ( trains)	Broadway, Woodhaven Boulevard, Cross Bay Boulevard, Rockaway Beach Boulevard	Select Bus Service	Local service on Woodhaven Boulevard provided by Q11.
Q54*	NYCT	Jamaica; 170th Street and Jamaica Avenue	↔	Williamsburg, Brooklyn; Williamsburg Bridge Plaza	Jamaica Avenue, Metropolitan Avenue, Grand Street	Local	Some trips in either direction start or terminate at Metropolitan Avenue and Fresh Pond Road.; Bus stops and travel path in Brooklyn subject to change with Brooklyn Bus Network Redesign.
Q55*	NYCT	Ridgewood Intermodal Terminal at Myrtle–Wyckoff Avenues ( trains)	↔	Richmond Hill; Hillside Avenue and Myrtle Avenue	Myrtle Avenue	Local	
Q56*	NYCT	East New York, Brooklyn; Broadway and Fulton Street at Broadway Junction ( trains)	↔	Jamaica; 170th Street and Jamaica Avenue	Jamaica Avenue	Local	Bus stops and travel path in Brooklyn subject to change with Brooklyn Bus Network Redesign.
Q58*	NYCT	Ridgewood Intermodal Terminal at Myrtle–Wyckoff Avenues ( trains)	↔	Flushing; 41st Road and Main Street near Flushing–Main Street ( trains)	Fresh Pond Road, Grand Avenue, Corona Avenue, College Point Boulevard	Local	Limited stop service available via Q98.
Q59*	NYCT	Williamsburg, Brooklyn; Williamsburg Bridge Plaza	↔	Rego Park; Horace Harding Expressway and Junction Boulevard (last drop-off), Queens Boulevard and 62nd Drive (first pick-up) at 63rd Drive–Rego Park ( trains)	Grand Street, Grand Avenue, Queens Boulevard	Local	Bus stops and travel path in Brooklyn subject to change with Brooklyn Bus Network Redesign.
Q60*	MTA Bus	East Midtown, Manhattan; East 60th Street and 2nd Avenue	↔	South Jamaica; 109th Avenue and 157th Street	Queens Boulevard, Sutphin Boulevard	Local	Travels between Manhattan and Queens via the Queensboro Bridge.
Q60*	MTA Bus	East Midtown, Manhattan; East 60th Street and 2nd Avenue	↔	Jamaica; Archer Avenue and Sutphin Boulevard at Sutphin Boulevard–Archer Avenue–JFK Airport ( trains), Jamaica LIRR station and AirTrain JFK	Queens Boulevard, Sutphin Boulevard	Local	Alternate terminus during the day
Q61	NYCT	Flushing; Main Street and Roosevelt Avenue at Flushing–Main Street ( trains)	↔	Beechhurst; 166th Street and Powells Cove Boulevard	Linden Place, Willets Point Boulevard, Francis Lewis Boulevard, 154th Street	Limited	Local service on Linden Place provided by Q25.; Local service on Francis Lewis Boulevard provided by Q76.
Q63	MTA Bus	Long Island City; 44th Drive and Jackson Avenue at Court Square ( trains)	↔	Flushing; Main Street and Roosevelt Avenue at Flushing–Main Street ( trains)	Northern Boulevard	Rush	Local service west of 39th Street provided by Q101.; Local service between 49th and 114th Street shared with Q66; local service east of 114th Street provided by Q66.
Q64*	MTA Bus	Forest Hills; Queens Blvd and 70th Road near Forest Hills–71st Avenue ( trains)	↔	Electchester; Jewel Avenue and 164th Street	Jewel Avenue	Local	Limited stop service available via Q74.
Q65*	MTA Bus	Flushing; Main Street and 38th Avenue Flushing–Main Street ( trains)	↔	Jamaica; Sutphin Boulevard and 94th Avenue at Sutphin Boulevard–Archer Avenue–JFK Airport ( trains), Jamaica LIRR station and AirTrain JFK	Sanford Avenue, 164th Street	Local	
Q66*	MTA Bus	Flushing; Main Street and Roosevelt Avenue Flushing–Main Street ( trains)	↔	Long Island City; 28th Street and Queens Plaza South at Queensboro Plaza ( trains) and Queens Plaza ( trains)	21st Street, 35th Avenue, Northern Boulevard	Local	
Q67	NYCT	Long Island City; Jackson Avenue and Thomson Avenue at Court Square ( trains)	↔	Middle Village; Metropolitan Avenue and Fresh Pond Road	Borden Avenue, 69th Street	Local	
Q69	MTA Bus	Long Island City; 28th Street and Queens Plaza South at Queensboro Plaza ( trains) and Queens Plaza ( trains)	↔	Jackson Heights; 82nd Street and Astoria Boulevard	21st Street, Ditmars Boulevard	Local	
Q70*	MTA Bus	Woodside; Woodside Avenue and 61st Street (last drop-off), 62nd Street and Roosevelt Avenue (first pick-up) at 61st Street–Woodside subway ( trains) and Woodside LIRR station	↺	LaGuardia Airport; Central Terminals	Roosevelt Avenue/Woodside Avenue, Brooklyn-Queens Expressway, Grand Central Parkway	Select Bus Service	One intermediate stop at Jackson Heights-Roosevelt Avenue/74th Street ( trains); Fare-free service since May 2022.
Q72	MTA Bus	Rego Park; 63rd Drive and Queens Boulevard at 63rd Drive–Rego Park ( trains)	↔	LaGuardia Airport; Central Terminals	Junction Boulevard, 94th Street	Local	
Q72	MTA Bus	Rego Park; 63rd Drive and Queens Boulevard at 63rd Drive–Rego Park ( trains)	↔	East Elmhurst; 94th Street and Ditmars Boulevard	Junction Boulevard, 94th Street	Local	Alternate weekday rush hour terminus.; Select early morning origin to LaGuardia Airport.
Q74	MTA Bus	Forest Hills; Queens Blvd and 70th Road near Forest Hills–71st Avenue ( trains)	↔	Bayside; 56th Avenue and 223rd Street at Queensborough Community College and Benjamin N. Cardozo High School	Jewel Avenue, 164th Street, Horace Harding Expressway	Limited	Local service on Jewel Avenue provided by Q64.
Q75	NYCT	Jamaica; Archer Avenue and Sutphin Boulevard at Sutphin Boulevard–Archer Avenue–JFK Airport ( trains), Jamaica LIRR station and AirTrain JFK	↔	Bayside; 56th Avenue and 223rd Street at Queensborough Community College and Benjamin N. Cardozo High School	Homelawn Street, Utopia Parkway, Horace Harding Expressway	Rush	Local service on Homelawn Street/Utopia Parkway provided by Q31.; No weekend service.
Q76	NYCT	Jamaica; 168th Street Bus Terminal	↔	College Point; College Point Boulevard and 15th Avenue	Hillside Avenue, Francis Lewis Boulevard, Cross Island Parkway, 14th Avenue	Local	
Q77	NYCT	Jamaica; 168th Street Bus Terminal	↔	Springfield Gardens; Farmers Boulevard and Rockaway Boulevard	Hillside Avenue, Francis Lewis Boulevard, Springfield Boulevard	Rush	Local service on Hillside Avenue provided by Q1, Q3, and Q76.

=== Q80 to Q115 ===
Route	Operator	Terminals			Streets Traveled	Route type	Notes
Q80*	MTA Bus	Kew Gardens; Union Turnpike and Kew Gardens Road at Kew Gardens–Union Turnpike ( trains)	↔	JFK International Airport; Lefferts Boulevard at AirTrain JFK Lefferts Boulevard station	Lefferts Boulevard	Local	
Q82	NYCT	Jamaica; 168th Street Bus Terminal	↔	Elmont, Nassau County; UBS Arena/Belmont Park	Hillside Avenue, 212th Street/212th Place, Hempstead Avenue	Rush	Local service on Hillside Avenue provided by Q1, Q3, and Q76.
Q83*	NYCT	Jamaica; 153rd Street and Hillside Avenue at Parsons Boulevard ( trains)	↔	Cambria Heights; 114th Avenue and 227th Street	Jamaica Avenue, Liberty Avenue, Murdock Avenue	Local	
Q84	NYCT	Jamaica; Parsons Boulevard and Archer Avenue at Jamaica Center–York College( trains)	↔	Laurelton; 238th Street and 130th Avenue	Merrick Boulevard, 120th Avenue	Rush	Local service on Merrick Boulevard provided by Q5.
Q85*	NYCT	Jamaica; Parsons Boulevard and Archer Avenue at Jamaica Center–York College( trains)	↔	Rosedale; 243rd Street and 147th Avenue	All trips: Merrick Boulevard, Bedell Street, Rosedale trips: 140th Avenue, South/North Conduit Avenue, 243rd Street	Rush	Local service on Merrick Boulevard provided by Q5.; Service to Valley Stream provided by Q89.
Q85*	NYCT	Jamaica; Parsons Boulevard and Archer Avenue at Jamaica Center–York College( trains)	← AM ---- → PM	Locust Manor; 137th Avenue and Farmers Boulevard	All trips: Merrick Boulevard, Bedell Street, Rosedale trips: 140th Avenue, South/North Conduit Avenue, 243rd Street	Rush	Select origin/terminus in the peak direction.
Q86*	NYCT	Jamaica; Parsons Boulevard and Archer Avenue at Jamaica Center–York College( trains)	↔	Rosedale; 149th Avenue and 253rd Street	Merrick Boulevard, Brookville Boulevard, 243rd Street	Rush	Local service on Merrick Boulevard provided by Q5.; No overnight service on weekends.
Q87	NYCT	Jamaica; Parsons Boulevard and Archer Avenue at Jamaica Center–York College( trains)	↔	Valley Stream, Nassau County; Green Acres Shopping Mall	Merrick Boulevard, Hook Creek Boulevard, Sunrise Highway	Rush	Local service on Merrick Boulevard provided by Q5.
Q88	NYCT	Elmhurst; 92nd Street and 59th Avenue at Woodhaven Boulevard ( trains) and Queens Center Mall	↔	Queens Village; Jamaica Avenue and Springfield Boulevard at Queens Village LIRR station	Horace Harding Expressway, 188th Street, 73rd Avenue, Springfield Boulevard	Local	
Q89	NYCT	Jamaica; Parsons Boulevard and Archer Avenue at Jamaica Center–York College ( trains)	↔	Valley Stream, Nassau County; Green Acres Shopping Mall	Merrick Boulevard, Bedell Street, 140th Avenue, South/North Conduit Avenue	Rush	Local service on Merrick Boulevard provided by Q5.
Q90	NYCT	LaGuardia Airport; Center Terminals	↔	Flushing; Main Street and 39th Avenue near Flushing–Main Street ( trains)	Roosevelt Avenue, Seaver Way, Ditmars Boulevard	Limited	
Q98	NYCT	Ridgewood Intermodal Terminal at Myrtle–Wyckoff Avenues ( trains)	↔	Flushing; 41st Road and Main Street near Flushing–Main Street ( trains)	Fresh Pond Road, Grand Avenue, Queens Boulevard, Long Island Expressway, College Point Boulevard	Limited	Local service provided by Q58 and Q59.
Q100*	MTA Bus	Long Island City; Jackson Avenue and Queens Plaza South at Queensboro Plaza ( trains) and Queens Plaza ( trains)	↔	Rikers Island, Bronx	21st Street, 20th Avenue	Limited	Local service on 21st Street provided by Q69.; Travels between Queens and the Bronx via the Rikers Island Bridge.
Q101*	MTA Bus	Hunters Point; Center Boulevard and Borden Avenue at Hunters Point South NYC Ferry landing and Long Island City LIRR station	↔	Steinway; 37th Street and 20th Avenue	Jackson Avenue, Steinway Street	Local	
Q102	MTA Bus	Roosevelt Island, Manhattan at subway station ( trains)	↔	Long Island City; 44th Drive and Jackson Avenue at Court Square ( trains)	Main Street (Manhattan), 36th Avenue, 31st Street, Jackson Avenue	Local	
Q103	MTA Bus	Hunters Point; Center Boulevard and Borden Avenue at Hunters Point South NYC Ferry landing and Long Island City LIRR station	↔	Astoria; 27th Avenue and 2nd Street	Vernon Boulevard, 21st Street	Local	
Q104	MTA Bus	Astoria; 11th Street and 34th Avenue	↔	Sunnyside; 48th Street and Queens Boulevard at 46th Street–Bliss Street ( train)	Broadway, 48th Street	Local	
Q110*	MTA Bus	Jamaica; 88th Avenue and Parsons Boulevard at Parsons Boulevard ( trains)	↔	Floral Park, Nassau County; Jericho Turnpike and Tulip Avenue	Jamaica Avenue	Local	
Q111*	MTA Bus	Jamaica; 88th Avenue and Parsons Boulevard at Parsons Boulevard ( trains)	↔	Rosedale; 148th Avenue and Hook Creek Boulevard	All trips: Guy R. Brewer Boulevard, 147th Avenue Cedarhurst trips: Rosedale Road, Peninsula Boulevard	Rush	Local service on Guy R. Brewer Boulevard provided by Q115.
Q111*	MTA Bus	Jamaica; 88th Avenue and Parsons Boulevard at Parsons Boulevard ( trains)	→ AM ---- ← PM	Cedarhurst, Nassau County; Peninsula Boulevard and Rockaway Turnpike	All trips: Guy R. Brewer Boulevard, 147th Avenue Cedarhurst trips: Rosedale Road, Peninsula Boulevard	Rush	Local service on Guy R. Brewer Boulevard provided by Q115.
Q112	MTA Bus	Jamaica; 88th Avenue and Parsons Boulevard at Parsons Boulevard ( trains)	↔	East New York, Brooklyn; Euclid Avenue and Pitkin Avenue at Euclid Avenue ( trains)	South Road, Liberty Avenue, Sutter Avenue, Pitkin Avenue	Local	
Q113	MTA Bus	Jamaica; 88th Avenue and Parsons Boulevard at Parsons Boulevard ( trains)	↔	Far Rockaway; Seagirt Boulevard and Beach 20th Street	Guy R. Brewer Boulevard, Rockaway Boulevard, Nassau Expressway, Central Avenue, Beach 9th Street	Limited	Local service on Guy R. Brewer Boulevard provided by Q115.
Q114*	MTA Bus	Jamaica; 88th Avenue and Parsons Boulevard at Parsons Boulevard ( trains)	↔	Far Rockaway; Seagirt Boulevard and Beach 20th Street	Guy R. Brewer Boulevard, 147th Avenue, Rockaway Turnpike, Nassau Expressway, Beach Channel Drive, Beach 9th Street	Rush	Local service on Guy R. Brewer Boulevard provided by Q115.
Q115*	MTA Bus	Jamaica; 88th Avenue and Parsons Boulevard at Parsons Boulevard ( trains)	↔	Springfield Gardens; Guy R. Brewer Boulevard and Farmers Boulevard	Guy R. Brewer Boulevard	Local	

=== Subway shuttle routes ===
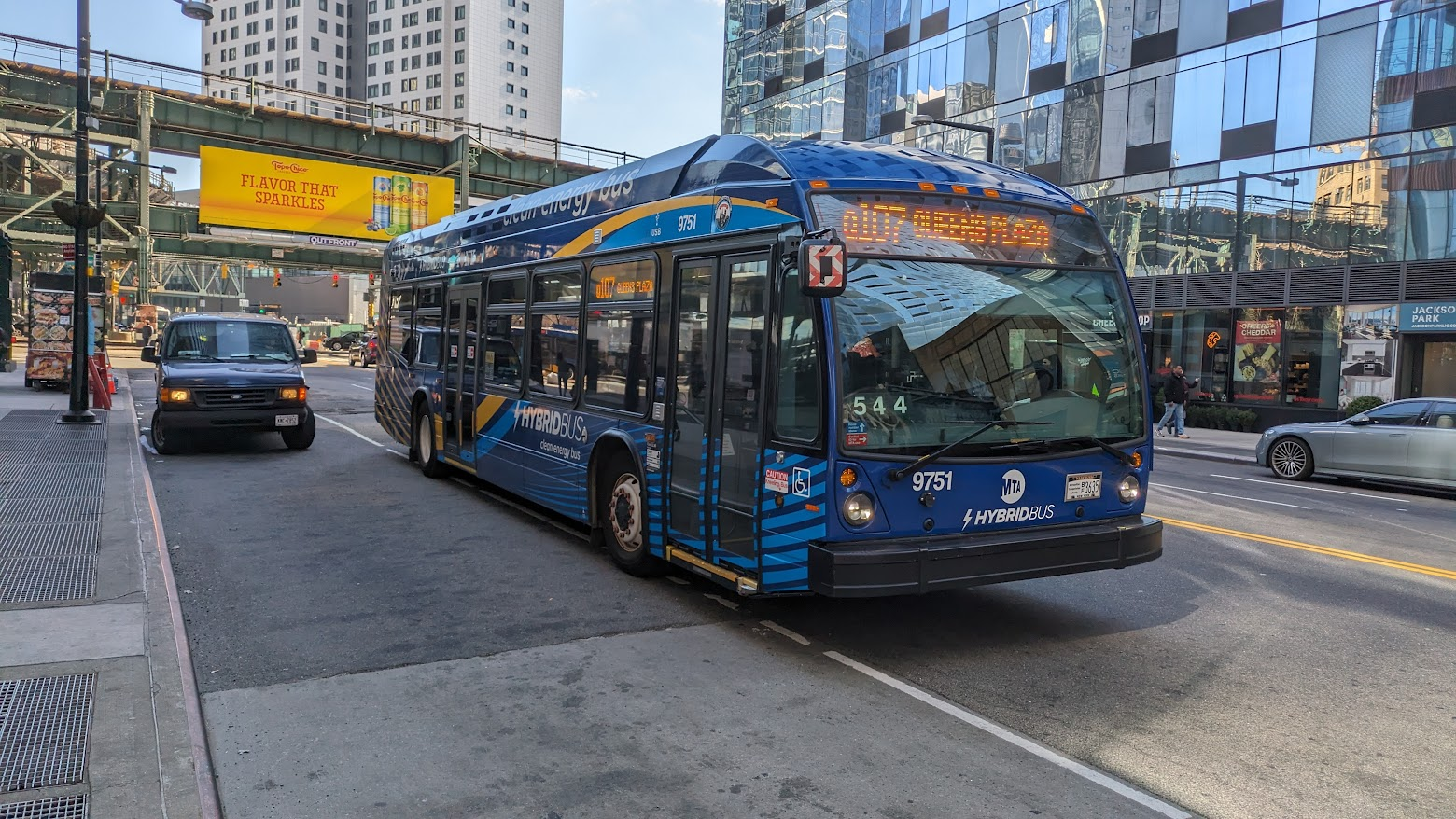
A 2021 Nova Bus LFS HEV (9751) on the Q107 (now T320) at Queens Plaza

The following table lists the scheduled NYC Bus routes that temporarily replace portions of service on the New York City Subway due to system maintenance.

Route	NYCS Service	Terminals			Primary streets traveled
J90	train	Crescent Street, Brooklyn ( train)	↔	Jamaica–Van Wyck ( train)	Jamaica Avenue
M90	train	Metropolitan Avenue-Middle Village ( train)	↔	Myrtle Avenue-Broadway, Brooklyn ( trains)	Metropolitan Avenue, Fresh Pond Road, Myrtle Avenue
Q96	trains	Court Square ( trains)	↔	21st Street–Queensbridge ( trains)	Jackson Avenue, 21st Street
Q97	Express Service				
Q97	train	Howard Beach–JFK Airport ( train)	↔	Far Rockaway-Mott Avenue ( train)	Lefferts Boulevard, Nassau Expressway, Rockaway Boulevard, Mott Avenue
Q108	train	39th Avenue ( trains)	↔	Queensboro Plaza ( trains) and Queens Plaza ( trains)	Queensboro Plaza trips: Northern Boulevard, Jackson Avenue; 39th Avenue trips: Queens Boulevard, Skillman Avenue, Honeywell Street
Q109	train	Howard Beach–JFK Airport ( train)	↔	Beach 67th Street ( train)	All trips: Lefferts Boulevard, North/South Conduit Avenue, Cross Bay Boulevard, Rockaway Beach Boulevard; Q121 trips: Beach Channel Drive
Q121	train	Howard Beach–JFK Airport ( train)	↔	Far Rockaway-Mott Avenue ( train)	All trips: Lefferts Boulevard, North/South Conduit Avenue, Cross Bay Boulevard, Rockaway Beach Boulevard; Q121 trips: Beach Channel Drive
T300	train	Kew Gardens-Union Turnpike ( trains)	↔	Jamaica Center-York College ( trains)	Queens Boulevard, Jamaica Avenue
T320	train	Jackson Heights–Roosevelt Avenue/74th Street ( trains)	↔	Queensboro Plaza ( trains) and Queens Plaza ( trains)	Roosevelt Avenue, Queens Boulevard
T321	train	Mets-Willets Point ( train)	↔	Flushing-Main Street ( train)	Roosevelt Avenue
T323	train	Vernon Boulevard–Jackson Avenue ( train)	↔	Queensboro Plaza ( trains) and Queens Plaza ( trains)	Jackson Avenue
T340	train	Broadway Junction, Brooklyn ( trains)	↔	Jamaica-Van Wyck ( train)	Atlantic Avenue, Crescent Street, Jamaica Avenue
T351	train	Beach 67th Street ( train)	↔	Rockaway Park-Beach 116th Street ( trains)	Rockaway Beach Boulevard
T354	train	Beach 90th Street ( trains)	↔	Far Rockaway-Mott Avenue ( train)	Far Rockaway trips: Rockaway Beach Boulevard, Rockaway Freeway; Beach 90th Street trips: Beach Channel Drive

=== Dollar vans ===
When the MTA discontinued some routes on June 27, 2010, operators of commuter vans, also known as dollar vans, were allowed to take over certain discontinued routes. In Queens, these routes were the Q74 and Q79. There are also dollar vans that operate from Jamaica Center, providing an alternative mode of transportation to bus routes such as the Q4 to Cambria Heights, the Q113 to Far Rockaway, and the Q5 to Green Acres Mall. The vans, some licensed by the New York City Taxi and Limousine Commission and some unlicensed, charge a fare of $2, lower than the $3 fare for MTA-operated local buses, but without free transfers.

In December 2011, City Councilman Leroy Comrie pushed the city to create designated bus stops for the dollar van services to alleviate traffic and interference of dollar vans with MTA buses. These dollar van stops for drop off and pick ups now includes the corner of 153rd Street and Archer Avenue along with Parsons Boulevard between Archer and Jamaica Avenue.

== History of current routes ==
The MTA announced a number of changes to the Queens bus routes for 2025. In December 2019, the MTA released a draft redesign of the Queens bus network with 77 routes. The routes were given a "QT" label to avoid confusion with existing routes. The "QT" prefix was tentative; in the final plan, all bus routes would have been labeled with "Q", similar to the existing routes. The final redesign was initially expected in mid- or late 2020, but the first draft attracted overwhelmingly negative feedback, with 11,000 comments about the plans. The redesign was delayed due to the COVID-19 pandemic in New York City. Planning resumed in mid-2021.

The original draft plan was dropped, and a revised plan with 85 routes was released on March 29, 2022. The new plan retained the "Q" prefix and preserves most of the existing routes. However, the new plan still contained significant changes compared with the existing bus map; only the Q70 SBS was not modified at all. In addition, 11 routes will be eliminated, 20 routes will be created, and 29 others will be truncated, extended, or combined with other routes.

A final plan was to have been released in early 2023 but was delayed until December 2023. The final plan includes one new route to Brooklyn, four new local routes, eight routes with new overnight service, and 27 rush routes. A second final plan was announced in December 2024. The new plans called for 124 bus routes, including 25 rush routes and 20 routes with expanded service hours. The routes were implemented in two parts, on June 29 and August 31, 2025. Several Brooklyn routes are being changed; for these changes, see List of bus routes in Brooklyn § Proposed bus route changes. For a list of proposed new express bus routes, see List of express bus routes in New York City § Proposed new bus routes.

There are to be four types of routes:

- Select Bus Service (originally high-density) – routes connecting highly populated corridors, with limited stops every 1,742 to 2,640 feet (531 to 805 m; 1/3 to 1/2 mi)
- Rush (originally subway connector) – routes connecting one or two neighborhoods to subway hubs, with a limited-stop section between the subway and the relevant neighborhoods. These often correspond to current routes with limited-stop variants.
- Limited-stop (originally intra-borough) – routes connecting several neighborhoods to subway hubs. These do not necessarily correspond to the current definition of limited-stop services, as the stops are spaced only slightly further than on local routes.
- Local (originally neighborhood) – routes connecting several neighborhoods to subway hubs and important destinations, typically at lower frequencies and higher stop densities compared to limited-stop routes

=== List of routes from June 29 to August 30, 2025 ===
This specific table gives details of routes in Queens between the first and second phases of implementation of the Queens Bus Network Redesign. The first phase took effect June 29, 2025.

==== Q1 to Q25 ====
Route	Operator	Terminals			Streets Traveled	Route type	Notes
Q1*	NYCT	Jamaica; Archer Avenue and Sutphin Boulevard at Sutphin Boulevard–Archer Avenue–JFK Airport ( trains), Jamaica LIRR station and AirTrain JFK	↔	Bellerose; 243rd Street and Braddock Avenue	Hillside Avenue, Braddock Avenue	Local	Springfield Boulevard branch replaced by rerouted Q36 and Q110.; Some Bellerose-bound trips will short-turn at Springfield Boulevard.
Q2*	NYCT	Jamaica; 168th Street Bus Terminal	↔	Elmont, Nassau County; UBS Arena/Belmont Park	Hillside Avenue, Hollis Avenue	Rush	Only changes to existing route are to stop spacing.; Local service on Hillside Avenue provided by Q1.
Q3*	NYCT	Jamaica; 168th Street Bus Terminal	↔	JFK International Airport; Lefferts Boulevard; AirTrain JFK at Lefferts Boulevard station	Hillside Avenue, Farmers Boulevard	Local	Only changes to existing route are to stop spacing.
Q4*	NYCT	Jamaica; Parsons Boulevard and Archer Avenue at Jamaica Center–Parsons/Archer ( trains)	↔	Cambria Heights; 235th Street and Linden Boulevard	Archer Avenue, Merrick Boulevard, Linden Boulevard	Rush	Only changes to existing route are to stop spacing.; Local service on Merrick Boulevard provided by Q5.
Q5*	NYCT	Jamaica; Parsons Boulevard and Archer Avenue at Jamaica Center–Parsons/Archer ( trains)	↔	Laurelton; 233rd Street and Merrick Boulevard	Merrick Boulevard	Local	Service truncated on east end.; Weekends, service terminates at Green Acres Mall or Rosedale station (overnight).; Branch via Brookville Boulevard now its own route, Q86.; Branch to Green Acres now its own route, Q87.
Q6*	MTA; Bus	Jamaica; 168th Street Bus Terminal	↔	JFK International Airport; North Cargo Road and Eastern Road at USPS Airport Mail Facility	Jamaica Avenue, Sutphin Boulevard, Rockaway Boulevard	Local and Limited	Does not serve JFK passenger terminals.; Limited-stop service operates weekday mornings toward Jamaica and weekday afternoons toward JFK Airport only.
Q7	MTA; Bus	East New York, Brooklyn; Euclid Avenue and Pitkin Avenue at Euclid Avenue ( trains)	↔	JFK International Airport; 148th Street and South Cargo Road	Pitkin Avenue, Rockaway Boulevard, 150th Street	Local	
Q8	MTA; Bus	Spring Creek, Brooklyn; Gateway Center Mall	↔	Jamaica; 168th Street Bus Terminal	Fountain Avenue, 101st Avenue, Jamaica Avenue	Local	
Q9	MTA; Bus	Jamaica; 168th Street Bus Terminal	↔	South Ozone Park; Rockaway Boulevard and Lincoln Street	Jamaica Avenue, Sutphin Boulevard, Liberty Avenue, 135th Street (Northbound), Van Wyck Expressway Service Road (Southbound), Lincoln Street.	Local	
Q10*	MTA; Bus	Kew Gardens; Union Turnpike and Kew Gardens Road at Kew Gardens–Union Turnpike ( trains)	↔	JFK International Airport; Lefferts Boulevard at AirTrain JFK Lefferts Boulevard station	Lefferts Boulevard (all trips), Rockaway Boulevard, 130th Street, Pan Am Road (local trips)	Local and Limited	No overnight limited-stop service.; Some local daytime trips operate only between Kew Gardens and South Ozone Park, and do not enter the airport.
Q11*	MTA; Bus	Elmhurst; Queens Boulevard and Woodhaven Boulevard at Woodhaven Boulevard ( trains) and Queens Center Mall	↔	Old Howard Beach; 165th Avenue and 99th Street at Charles Park	Woodhaven Boulevard, Cross Bay Boulevard, then: Toward Old Howard Beach: 160th Avenue, 99th Street; Toward Hamilton Beach: 104th Street.	Local	Weekday rush hours, some southbound service terminates at Pitkin Avenue and Cross Bay Boulevard in Ozone Park.; Overnights, the southern terminal is at Pitkin Avenue and Cross Bay Boulevard.
Q11*	MTA; Bus	Elmhurst; Queens Boulevard and Woodhaven Boulevard at Woodhaven Boulevard ( trains) and Queens Center Mall	↔	Hamilton Beach; 165th Avenue and 104th Street	Woodhaven Boulevard, Cross Bay Boulevard, then: Toward Old Howard Beach: 160th Avenue, 99th Street; Toward Hamilton Beach: 104th Street.	Local	Weekday rush hours, some southbound service terminates at Pitkin Avenue and Cross Bay Boulevard in Ozone Park.; Overnights, the southern terminal is at Pitkin Avenue and Cross Bay Boulevard.
Q12*	NYCT	Flushing; Roosevelt Avenue and Main Street at Flushing–Main Street ( trains)	↔	Little Neck; Glenwood Street and Northern Boulevard	Northern Boulevard	Local	Service rerouted on west end (swapped with Q13).
Q13	NYCT	Flushing; Roosevelt Avenue and Main Street at Flushing–Main Street ( trains)	↔	Fort Totten; Fort Road and Cross Island Parkway	Sanford Avenue, Northern Boulevard, Bell Boulevard	Rush	Service rerouted on west end (swapped with Q12).; Local service provided on Sanford Avenue by Q65 and on Northern Boulevard by Q12.
Q14	NYCT	Ridgewood; Forest Avenue and Fairview Avenue at Forest Avenue ( train)	↔	East Elmhurst; 31st Avenue and 102nd Street	Forest Avenue, Eliot Avenue, 99th Street, 103rd Street/104th and 102nd Streets	Local	New route merging part of the existing Q23 and Q38.
Q15	NYCT	Flushing; Roosevelt Avenue and Main Street at Flushing–Main Street ( trains)	↔	Beechhurst; 166th Street and Powells Cove Boulevard	41st Avenue, 150th Street, 10th Avenue, Powells Cove Boulevard	Local	Route to follow current Q15A variant with minor changes to routing.; Northern part of current Q15 replaced by the Q61.
Q16	NYCT	Flushing; Roosevelt Avenue and Main Street at Flushing–Main Street ( trains)	↔	Fort Totten; Fort Road and Cross Island Parkway	Union Street, Bayside Avenue, 29th Avenue, Utopia Parkway	Local	Willets Point/Francis Lewis branch eliminated.
Q17*	NYCT	Flushing; Roosevelt Avenue and Main Street at Flushing–Main Street ( trains)	↔	Jamaica; Merrick Boulevard and Jamaica Avenue	Kissena Boulevard, Horace Harding Expressway, 188th Street	Local	Only changes to existing route are to stop spacing.
Q18	MTA; Bus	Astoria; 2nd Street and 27th Avenue	↔	Maspeth; 69th Street and Grand Avenue	30th Avenue, 58th Street, Woodside Avenue, 65th Place, 69th Street	Local	
Q19	MTA; Bus	Astoria; 2nd Street and 27th Avenue	↔	Flushing; Main Street and Roosevelt Avenue at Flushing–Main Street ( trains)	Astoria Boulevard	Local	
Q20*	NYCT	College Point; College Point Boulevard and 15th Avenue	↔	Jamaica; Merrick Boulevard and Archer Avenue	20th Avenue, Union Street, Main Street	Local	Q20B variant discontinued.; Northern part of route rerouted to replace Q34 (discontinued).; Southern part of route rerouted to avoid turns.; Remaining portion is similar to Q20A routing.
Q21	MTA; Bus	Elmhurst; Queens Boulevard and Woodhaven Boulevard at Woodhaven Boulevard ( trains) and Queens Center Mall	↔	Howard Beach; 164th Avenue and 92nd Street	Woodhaven Boulevard, 155th Avenue, 157th Avenue, Cross Bay Boulevard	Local	Operates via 157th Avenue in Lindenwood between Howard Beach and Ozone Park.
Q22	MTA; Bus	Far Rockaway; Mott Avenue and Beach 20th Street at Far Rockaway–Mott Avenue ( train)	↔	Roxbury; Beach 169th Street and Rockaway Point Boulevard	Beach Channel Drive, Rockaway Beach Boulevard	Local	Summer service operates via Jacob Riis Park; Many daytime trips terminate and start at Rockaway Park–Beach 116th Street ( trains)
Q23*	MTA; Bus	East Elmhurst; Ditmars Boulevard and 102nd Street	↔	Glendale; Union Turnpike opposite Forest View Crescent Apartments	Ditmars Boulevard, 108th Street, 69th Avenue	Local	Northern part of route straightened out (replaced by the proposed Q14).; Section in Forest Hills diverted to Yellowstone Boulevard to avoid traffic.
Q24*	NYCT	Bedford–Stuyvesant, Brooklyn; Patchen Avenue and Broadway at Kosciuszko Street ( train)	↔	Jamaica; 168th Street and Archer Avenue	Jamaica/Archer Avenues, Atlantic Avenue, Broadway (Brooklyn)	Local	Some Saturday daytime service terminates at Broadway Junction ( trains)
Q25*	MTA; Bus	College Point; Poppenhusen Avenue and 119th Street	↔	Jamaica; Archer Avenue and Sutphin Boulevard at Sutphin Boulevard–Archer Avenue–JFK Airport ( trains), Jamaica LIRR station and AirTrain JFK	127th Street, Kissena Boulevard, Parsons Boulevard	Local	Only changes to existing route are to stop spacing.

==== Q26 to Q50 ====
Route	Operator	Terminals			Streets Traveled	Route type	Notes
Q26*	MTA; Bus	College Point; 14th Avenue and 110th Street	↔	Auburndale; Francis Lewis Boulevard and Hollis Court Boulevard	College Point Boulevard, Sanford Avenue, Parsons Boulevard, 46th Avenue, Hollis Court Boulevard	Local	Western part of route extended to replace northern part of Q65.; Service will operate 24/7.; Overnight service operates between College Point and Flushing only.
Q27*	NYCT	Flushing; 39th Avenue and Union Street at Flushing–Main Street ( trains)	↔	Cambria Heights; Francis Lewis Boulevard and 120th Avenue	Sanford Avenue, Parsons Boulevard, 46th, 47th, 48th Avenues, Springfield Boulevard	Rush	Service in Flushing rerouted to Sanford Avenue and Parsons Boulevard; Local service along Parsons Boulevard and 46th Avenue provided by Q26
Q28*	MTA; Bus	Flushing; 39th Avenue and Union Street at Flushing–Main Street ( trains)	↔	Bay Terrace; Shopping Center	Northern Boulevard, Crocheron Avenue, 32nd Avenue, Corporal Kennedy Street	Rush	Only changes to existing route are to stop spacing.; Local service on Northern Boulevard provided by Q12.
Q29	NYCT	Glendale; 81st Street and Myrtle Avenue	↔	Jackson Heights; 82nd Street and Roosevelt Avenue at 82nd Street–Jackson Heights ( train)	80th Street, Dry Harbor Road, 90th/92nd Streets	Local	Only changes to existing route are to stop spacing.
Q30	NYCT	Jamaica; Archer Avenue and Sutphin Boulevard at Sutphin Boulevard–Archer Avenue–JFK Airport ( trains), Jamaica LIRR station and AirTrain JFK	↔	Little Neck; Little Neck Parkway and Nassau Boulevard	Homelawn Street, Utopia Parkway, Horace Harding Expressway	Rush	Queensborough Community College service becomes its own route, Q75.; Local service on Homelawn Street/Utopia Parkway provided by Q31.
Q31	NYCT	Jamaica; Archer Avenue and Sutphin Boulevard at Sutphin Boulevard–Archer Avenue–JFK Airport ( trains), Jamaica LIRR station and AirTrain JFK	↔	Bay Terrace; Shopping Center	Homelawn Street, Utopia Parkway, 47th/48th Avenues, Bell Boulevard	Local	Rerouted on northern end to serve Bay Terrace.
Q32	MTA; Bus	Penn Station, Midtown Manhattan; West 32nd Street and 7th Avenue	↔	Jackson Heights; Northern Boulevard and 81st Street	Madison Avenue/Fifth Avenue (Manhattan), Queens Boulevard, Roosevelt Avenue	Local	Travels between Manhattan and Queens via the Queensboro Bridge.
Q33*	MTA; Bus	Jackson Heights; Jackson Heights–Roosevelt Avenue/74th Street ( trains)	↔	East Elmhurst; Ditmars Boulevard and 94th Street	Roosevelt Avenue, 82nd/83rd Streets, 23rd Avenue	Local	
Q35*	MTA; Bus	Midwood, Brooklyn; Avenue H and Flatbush Avenue at Flatbush Avenue ( trains)	↔	Rockaway Park; Beach 116th Street and Newport Avenue at Rockaway Park–Beach 116th Street ( trains)	Flatbush Avenue, Newport Avenue	Local	Summer service operates via Jacob Riis Park during daytime and evenings.; Travels between Brooklyn and Queens via the Marine Parkway–Gil Hodges Memorial Bridge.
Q36	NYCT	Jamaica; 168th Street Bus Terminal	↔	Little Neck; 40th Avenue and Little Neck Parkway at Little Neck LIRR Station	Hillside Avenue, Springfield Boulevard, Jamaica Avenue/Jericho Turnpike, Little Neck Parkway	Rush	Weekend service to Little Neck added.; Service rerouted in Queens Village.; Short turns in Floral Park removed.
Q37	MTA; Bus	Kew Gardens; Union Turnpike and Kew Gardens Road at Kew Gardens–Union Turnpike ( trains)	↔	South Ozone Park; 135th Road and 131st Street	Park Lane South, 111th Street, Aqueduct Racetrack trips: Aqueduct Road, then: 135th Avenue	Local	
Q38	NYCT	Middle Village; Metropolitan Avenue and Fresh Pond Road	↔	Rego Park; 62nd Drive and 108th Street	Metropolitan Avenue, Juniper Valley Road, Penelope Avenue, 63rd Drive, 63rd Road/62nd Drive	Local	Corona portion split to new route, Q14.
Q39*	NYCT	Long Island City; 28th Street and Queens Plaza South at Queensboro Plaza ( trains) and Queens Plaza ( trains)	↔	Glendale; Cooper Avenue and 60th Lane	48th Avenue, 58th Street, Forest Avenue	Local	Service via Court Square eliminated
Q40	MTA; Bus	Jamaica; Sutphin Boulevard and Hillside Avenue at Sutphin Boulevard ( train)	↔	South Jamaica; 135th Avenue and 143rd Street	Sutphin Boulevard, Lakewood Avenue, 142nd/143rd Streets	Local	
Q41	MTA; Bus	Jamaica; 168th Street Bus Terminal	↔	Howard Beach; 164th Avenue and 92nd Street	Jamaica Avenue, 127th Street, 109th Avenue, 155th Avenue, 157th Avenue, Cross Bay Boulevard	Local	
Q42	NYCT	Jamaica; Parsons Boulevard and Archer Avenue at Jamaica Center–Parsons/Archer ( trains)	↔	Addisleigh Park; Sayres Avenue and 180th Street	Liberty Avenue, 174th Street, Sayres Avenue	Local	Only changes to existing route are to stop spacing.
Q43*	NYCT	Jamaica; Archer Avenue and Sutphin Boulevard at Sutphin Boulevard–Archer Avenue–JFK Airport ( trains), Jamaica LIRR station and AirTrain JFK	↔	Floral Park; 268th Street and Hillside Avenue	Hillside Avenue	Rush	Only changes to existing route are to stop spacing.; Local service on Hillside Avenue provided by Q1.
Q44*	NYCT	West Farms, Bronx; East 180th Street and Boston Road near Bronx Zoo and West Farms Square–East Tremont Avenue ( trains)	↔	Jamaica; Merrick Boulevard and Archer Avenue	East 177th Street (Cross Bronx Expressway service road), Parsons Boulevard, Main Street, Archer Avenue	Select Bus Service	No changes.; Local service on Main Street provided by Q20.
Q45*	NYCT	Kew Gardens; Queens Boulevard and 78th Avenue at Kew Gardens–Union Turnpike ( trains)	↔	Fresh Meadows; 188th Street and 64th Avenue	Union Turnpike, 188th Street	Local	New route providing new service
Q46*	NYCT	Kew Gardens; Queens Boulevard and 78th Avenue at Kew Gardens–Union Turnpike ( trains)	↔	Lake Success, Nassau County; Long Island Jewish Medical Center	Union Turnpike	Rush	Branch to Glen Oaks now its own route, Q48.; Local service on Union Turnpike west of 188th Street provided by Q45.
Q47	MTA; Bus	LaGuardia Airport; Marine Air Terminal	↔	Glendale; The Shops at Atlas Park	74th/75th Streets, 69th Street, 80th Street	Local	
Q48	NYCT	Kew Gardens; Queens Boulevard and 78th Avenue at Kew Gardens–Union Turnpike ( trains)	↔	Glen Oaks; 260th Street and Little Neck Parkway	Union Turnpike, 260th Street	Rush	Weekday service only.; Replaces the Q46 Glen Oaks branch.; Local service on Union Turnpike west of 188th Street provided by Q45.
Q49	MTA; Bus	Jackson Heights; Jackson Heights–Roosevelt Avenue/74th Street ( trains)	↔	East Elmhurst; 31st Avenue and 102nd Street	35th Avenue, 89th/90th Streets, Astoria Boulevard	Local	
Q50*	MTA; Bus	Flushing; Main Street and 39th Avenue near Flushing–Main Street ( trains)	↔	Pelham Bay, Bronx; Westchester Avenue and Bruckner Boulevard at Pelham Bay Park ( trains)	All trips: Whitestone Expressway, Hutchinson River Parkway, Bruckner Boulevard; Co-op City trips: Co-op City Boulevard	Limited	Extended during rush hours to and in Co-op City.
Q50*	MTA; Bus	Flushing; Main Street and 39th Avenue near Flushing–Main Street ( trains)	↔	Co-op City, Bronx; Earhart Lane and Erskine Place	All trips: Whitestone Expressway, Hutchinson River Parkway, Bruckner Boulevard; Co-op City trips: Co-op City Boulevard	Limited	Extended during rush hours to and in Co-op City.

==== Q51 to Q77 ====
Route	Operator	Terminals			Streets Traveled	Route type	Notes
Q51	MTA; Bus	Ozone Park; Rockaway Boulevard and Liberty Avenue at Rockaway Boulevard ( train)	↔	Cambria Heights; Linden Boulevard and Francis Lewis Boulevard	Rockaway Boulevard, Linden Boulevard	Limited	New route, provides new service.
Q52	MTA; Bus	Elmhurst; Queens Boulevard and Woodhaven Boulevard at Woodhaven Boulevard ( trains) and Queens Center Mall	↔	Arverne; Beach 54th Street and Beach Channel Drive	Woodhaven Boulevard, Cross Bay Boulevard, Rockaway Beach Boulevard	Select Bus Service	Local service on Woodhaven Boulevard provided by Q11 and Q21.
Q53*	MTA; Bus	Woodside; 61st Street and Roosevelt Avenue at 61st Street–Woodside subway ( trains) and Woodside LIRR station	↔	Rockaway Park; Beach 116th Street at Rockaway Park–Beach 116th Street station ( trains)	Broadway, Woodhaven Boulevard, Cross Bay Boulevard, Rockaway Beach Boulevard	Select Bus Service	No changes.; Local service on Woodhaven Boulevard provided by Q11 and Q21.
Q54*	NYCT	Williamsburg, Brooklyn; Williamsburg Bridge Plaza	↔	Jamaica; 170th Street and Jamaica Avenue	Grand Street, Metropolitan Avenue, Jamaica Avenue	Local	Only changes to existing route are to stop spacing.
Q55*	NYCT	Ridgewood Intermodal Terminal at Myrtle–Wyckoff Avenues ( trains)	↔	Richmond Hill; Hillside Avenue and Myrtle Avenue	Myrtle Avenue	Local	Only changes to existing route are to stop spacing.
Q56*	NYCT	East New York, Brooklyn; Broadway and Fulton Street at Broadway Junction ( trains)	↔	Jamaica; 170th Street and Jamaica Avenue	Jamaica Avenue	Local	
Q58*	NYCT	Ridgewood Intermodal Terminal at Myrtle–Wyckoff Avenues ( trains)	↔	Flushing; 41st Road and Main Street near Flushing–Main Street ( trains)	Fresh Pond Road, Grand Avenue, Corona Avenue, College Point Boulevard	Local	Only changes to existing route are to stop spacing.
Q59*	NYCT	Williamsburg, Brooklyn; Williamsburg Bridge Plaza	↔	Rego Park; Horace Harding Expressway and Junction Boulevard (last drop-off), Queens Boulevard and 62nd Drive (first pick-up) at 63rd Drive–Rego Park ( trains)	Grand Street, Grand Avenue, Queens Boulevard	Local	Only changes to existing route are to stop spacing.
Q60*	MTA; Bus	East Midtown, Manhattan; East 60th Street and 2nd Avenue	↔	South Jamaica; 109th Avenue and 157th Street	Queens Boulevard, Sutphin Boulevard	Local	Travels between Manhattan and Queens via the Queensboro Bridge.
Q61	NYCT	Flushing; Main Street and Roosevelt Avenue at Flushing–Main Street ( trains)	↔	Beechhurst; 166th Street and Powells Cove Boulevard	Union Street, Willets Point Boulevard, Cross Island Parkway	Limited	New route replacing portions of the Q15 and discontinued Q34.
Q63	MTA; Bus	Long Island City; 28th Street and Queens Plaza South at Queensboro Plaza ( trains) and Queens Plaza ( trains)	↔	Flushing; Main Street and Roosevelt Avenue at Flushing–Main Street ( trains)	Northern Boulevard	Rush	New route supplementing Q66.; Local service west of 39th Street provided by Q101.; Local service between 49th and 114th Street shared with Q66; local service east of 114th Street provided by Q66.
Q64*	MTA; Bus	Forest Hills; Queens Blvd and 70th Road near Forest Hills–71st Avenue ( trains)	↔	Electchester; Jewel Avenue and 164th Street	Jewel Avenue	Local	Only changes to existing route are to stop spacing.; Limited stop service available via Q74.
Q65*	MTA; Bus	Flushing; Main Street and 39th Avenue near Flushing–Main Street ( trains)	↔	Jamaica; Sutphin Boulevard and 94th Avenue at Sutphin Boulevard–Archer Avenue–JFK Airport ( trains), Jamaica LIRR station and AirTrain JFK	Sanford Avenue, 164th Street	Local	Northern part of route truncated and replaced by the Q26.
Q66*	MTA; Bus	Long Island City; 28th Street and Queens Plaza South at Queensboro Plaza ( trains) and Queens Plaza ( trains)	↔	Flushing; Main Street and 39th Avenue near Flushing–Main Street ( trains)	21st Street, 35th Avenue, Northern Boulevard	Local	Only changes to existing route are to stop spacing.
Q67	NYCT	Long Island City; Jackson Avenue and Thomson Avenue at Court Square ( trains)	↔	Middle Village; Metropolitan Avenue and Fresh Pond Road	Borden Avenue, 69th Street, Metropolitan Avenue	Local	Rerouted and truncated on northern end.
Q69	MTA; Bus	Long Island City; 28th Street and Queens Plaza South at Queensboro Plaza ( trains) and Queens Plaza ( trains)	↔	Jackson Heights; 82nd Street and Astoria Boulevard	21st Street, Ditmars Boulevard	Local	
Q70*	MTA; Bus	Woodside; Woodside Avenue and 61st Street (last drop-off), 62nd Street and Roosevelt Avenue (first pick-up) at 61st Street–Woodside subway ( trains) and Woodside LIRR station	↺	LaGuardia Airport; Central Terminals	Roosevelt Avenue/Woodside Avenue, Brooklyn-Queens Expressway, Grand Central Parkway	Select Bus Service	No changes.
Q72	NYCT	Rego Park; 63rd Drive and Queens Boulevard at 63rd Drive–Rego Park ( trains)	↔	LaGuardia Airport; Central Terminals	Junction Boulevard, 94th Street	Local	
Q74	MTA; Bus	Forest Hills; Queens Blvd and 70th Road near Forest Hills–71st Avenue ( trains)	↔	Bayside; 56th Avenue and 223rd Street at Queensborough Community College and Benjamin N. Cardozo High School	Jewel Avenue, 164th Street, Horace Harding Expressway	Limited	New route from Forest Hills to Queensborough Community College.; Local service on Jewel Avenue provided by Q64.
Q75	NYCT	Jamaica; Archer Avenue and Sutphin Boulevard at Sutphin Boulevard–Archer Avenue–JFK Airport ( trains), Jamaica LIRR station and AirTrain JFK	↔	Bayside; 56th Avenue and 223rd Street at Queensborough Community College and Benjamin N. Cardozo High School	Homelawn Street, Utopia Parkway, Horace Harding Expressway	Rush	New route replacing service to Queensborough Community College.; Local service on Utopia Parkway provided by Q31.; To be operated by NYCT.
Q76	NYCT	Jamaica; 168th Street Bus Terminal	↔	College Point; College Point Boulevard and 15th Avenue	Hillside Avenue, Francis Lewis Boulevard, Cross Island Parkway, 14th Avenue	Local	Service extended and streamlined on northern end.
Q77	NYCT	Jamaica; 168th Street Bus Terminal	↔	Springfield Gardens; Farmers Boulevard and Rockaway Boulevard	Hillside Avenue, Francis Lewis Boulevard, Springfield Boulevard	Rush	Service extended at southern end.; Local service on Hillside Avenue provided by Q1 and Q76.

==== Q82 to Q115 ====
Route	Operator	Terminals			Streets Traveled	Route type	Notes
Q82	NYCT	Jamaica; 168th Street Bus Terminal	↔	Elmont, Nassau County; UBS Arena/Belmont Park	Hillside Avenue, 212th Place/212th Street, Hempstead Avenue	Rush	New route replacing Q36 on 212th Street/Place and Q110 on Hempstead Avenue.; Local service on Hillside Avenue provided by Q1.
Q83*	NYCT	Jamaica; 153rd Street and Hillside Avenue at Parsons Boulevard ( trains)	↔	Cambria Heights; 114th Avenue and 227th Street	Jamaica Avenue, Liberty Avenue, Murdock Avenue	Local	Overnight branch to Queens Village LIRR station discontinued.
Q84	NYCT	Jamaica; Parsons Boulevard and Archer Avenue at Jamaica Center–Parsons/Archer ( trains)	↔	Laurelton; 238th Street and 130th Avenue	Merrick Boulevard, 120th Avenue	Rush	Only changes to existing route are to stop spacing.; Local service on Merrick Boulevard provided by Q5.
Q85*	NYCT	Jamaica; Parsons Boulevard and Archer Avenue at Jamaica Center–Parsons/Archer ( trains)	↔	Rosedale; 243rd Street and 147th Avenue	Merrick Boulevard, Bedell Street, 140th Avenue, South/North Conduit Avenue, 243rd Street	Rush	Minor realignment in Jamaica.; Local service on Merrick Boulevard provided by Q5.; Service to Valley Stream provided by Q89.
Q86*	NYCT	Jamaica; Parsons Boulevard and Archer Avenue at Jamaica Center–Parsons/Archer ( trains)	↔	Rosedale; 149th Avenue and 253rd Street	Merrick Boulevard, Brookville Boulevard, 243rd Street	Rush	New route taking over Rosedale branches of Q5 and Q85.; Local service on Merrick Boulevard provided by Q5.; No overnight service on weekends.
Q87	NYCT	Jamaica; Parsons Boulevard and Archer Avenue at Jamaica Center–Parsons/Archer ( trains)	↔	Valley Stream, Nassau County; Green Acres Shopping Mall	Merrick Boulevard, Hook Creek Boulevard, Sunrise Highway	Rush	New route taking over Green Acres branch of Q5.; Local service on Merrick Boulevard provided by Q5.; Weekday service only.
Q88	NYCT	Elmhurst; 92nd Street and 59th Avenue at Woodhaven Boulevard ( trains) and Queens Center Mall	↔	Queens Village; Jamaica Avenue and Springfield Boulevard at Queens Village LIRR station	Horace Harding Expressway, 188th Street, 73rd Avenue, Springfield Boulevard	Local	Only changes to existing route are to stop spacing.
Q89	NYCT	Jamaica; Parsons Boulevard and Archer Avenue at Jamaica Center–Parsons/Archer ( trains)	↔	Valley Stream, Nassau County; Green Acres Shopping Mall	Merrick Boulevard, Bedell Street, 140th Avenue, South/North Conduit Avenue	Rush	New route taking over Green Acres branch of Q85.; Local service on Merrick Boulevard provided by Q5.
Q90	NYCT	LaGuardia Airport; Center Terminals	↔	Flushing; Main Street and 39th Avenue near Flushing–Main Street ( trains)	Roosevelt Avenue, Seaver Way, Ditmars Boulevard	Limited	New route replacing the old Q48.
Q98	NYCT	Ridgewood Intermodal Terminal at Myrtle–Wyckoff Avenues ( trains)	↔	Flushing; 41st Road and Main Street near Flushing–Main Street ( trains)	Fresh Pond Road, Grand Avenue, Queens Boulevard, Horace Harding Expressway, College Point Boulevard	Limited	New route supplementing existing Q58.; Local service provided by Q58 and Q59.
Q100*	MTA; Bus	Long Island City; Jackson Avenue and Queens Plaza South at Queensboro Plaza ( trains) and Queens Plaza ( trains)	↔	Rikers Island, Bronx	21st Street, 20th Avenue	Limited	
Q101*	MTA; Bus	East Midtown, Manhattan; East 60th Street and 2nd Avenue	↔	Steinway; Hazen Street and 19th Avenue	Steinway Street	Local	Travels between Manhattan and Queens via the Queensboro Bridge.
Q102	MTA; Bus	Roosevelt Island, Manhattan; Coler–Goldwater Hospital	↔	Astoria; 27th Avenue and 2nd Street	Main Street (Manhattan), Vernon Boulevard, 31st Street, 30th Avenue	Local	Travels between Manhattan and Queens via the Roosevelt Island Bridge.
Q103	MTA; Bus	Hunters Point; Borden Avenue and Vernon Boulevard at Vernon Boulevard–Jackson Avenue ( trains) and Long Island City LIRR station	↔	Astoria; 27th Avenue and 2nd Street	Vernon Boulevard	Local	
Q104	MTA; Bus	Astoria; 11th Street and 34th Avenue	↔	Sunnyside; 48th Street and Queens Boulevard at 46th Street–Bliss Street ( train)	Broadway, 48th Street	Local	
Q110*	MTA; Bus	Jamaica; 88th Avenue and Parsons Boulevard at Parsons Boulevard ( trains)	↔	Floral Park, Nassau County; Jericho Turnpike and Tulip Avenue	Jamaica Avenue	Local	Branch to 179th Street and Hillside Avenue discontinued.; Rerouted and extended on eastern end.
Q111*	MTA; Bus	Jamaica; 88th Avenue and Parsons Boulevard at Parsons Boulevard ( trains)	↔	Rosedale; 148th Avenue and Hook Creek Boulevard	All trips: Guy R. Brewer Boulevard, 147th Avenue Cedarhurst trips: Rosedale Road, Peninsula Boulevard	Rush	Only changes to existing route are to stop spacing.; Local service on Guy R. Brewer Boulevard provided by Q113 and Q115.
Q111*	MTA; Bus	Jamaica; 88th Avenue and Parsons Boulevard at Parsons Boulevard ( trains)	→ AM ---- ← PM	Cedarhurst, Nassau County; Peninsula Boulevard and Rockaway Turnpike	All trips: Guy R. Brewer Boulevard, 147th Avenue Cedarhurst trips: Rosedale Road, Peninsula Boulevard	Rush	Only changes to existing route are to stop spacing.; Local service on Guy R. Brewer Boulevard provided by Q113 and Q115.
Q112	MTA; Bus	Jamaica; 88th Avenue and Parsons Boulevard at Parsons Boulevard ( trains)	↔	East New York, Brooklyn; Euclid Avenue and Pitkin Avenue at Euclid Avenue ( trains)	South Road, Liberty Avenue, Sutter Avenue, Pitkin Avenue	Local	Service extended along west end.
Q113	MTA; Bus	Jamaica; 88th Avenue and Parsons Boulevard at Parsons Boulevard ( trains)	↔	Far Rockaway; Seagirt Boulevard and Beach 20th Street	Guy R. Brewer Boulevard, Rockaway Boulevard, Nassau Expressway, Central Avenue, Beach 9th Street	Limited	Service straightened at north end.
Q114*	MTA; Bus	Jamaica; 88th Avenue and Parsons Boulevard at Parsons Boulevard ( trains)	↔	Far Rockaway; Seagirt Boulevard and Beach 20th Street	Guy R. Brewer Boulevard, 147th Avenue, Rockaway Turnpike, Nassau Expressway, Beach Channel Drive, Beach 9th Street	Rush	Only changes to existing route are to stop spacing.; Local service on Guy R. Brewer Boulevard provided by Q113 and Q115.
Q115*	MTA; Bus	Jamaica; 88th Avenue and Parsons Boulevard at Parsons Boulevard ( trains)	↔	Springfield Gardens; Guy R. Brewer Boulevard and Farmers Boulevard	Guy R. Brewer Boulevard	Local	New route providing local service for Q111 and Q114.

=== List of routes before June 29, 2025 ===
==== Q1 to Q24 ====
Route	Operator	Terminals			Streets traveled	Notes
Q1*	NYCT	Jamaica; 168th Street Bus Terminal; Island A, Stand 1	↔	Bellerose; 243rd Street and Braddock Avenue	Hillside Avenue, then: Toward Bellerose: Braddock Avenue; Toward Queens Village: Springfield Boulevard	Overnight service operates to Bellerose, then to Queens Village via Jamaica Avenue.
Q1*	NYCT	Jamaica; 168th Street Bus Terminal; Island A, Stand 1	↔	Queens Village; Jamaica Avenue and Springfield Boulevard at Queens Village LIRR station	Hillside Avenue, then: Toward Bellerose: Braddock Avenue; Toward Queens Village: Springfield Boulevard	Overnight service operates to Bellerose, then to Queens Village via Jamaica Avenue.
Q2*	NYCT	Jamaica; 168th Street Bus Terminal; Island A, Stand 2	↔	Elmont, Nassau County; UBS Arena/Belmont Park	Hillside Avenue, Hollis Avenue	
Q3*	NYCT	Jamaica; 168th Street Bus Terminal; Island A, Stand 3	↔	JFK International Airport; Lefferts Blvd Airtrain	Hillside Avenue, Farmers Boulevard	Operates via Terminal 8 at JFK airport
Q4*	NYCT	Local Service				
Q4*	NYCT	Limited-Stop Service				
Q4*	NYCT	Jamaica; Parsons Boulevard and Archer Avenue at Jamaica Center–Parsons/Archer ( trains)	↔	Cambria Heights; 235th Street and Linden Boulevard	Merrick Boulevard, Linden Boulevard	Fare-free service for six to 12 months started on September 24, 2023, and ended August 31, 2024.; Limited-stop service operates weekday mornings in both directions and weekday afternoons towards Cambria Heights only (during summer weekdays: mornings toward Jamaica and afternoons toward Cambria Heights).
Q5*	NYCT	Local Service				
Q5*	NYCT	Jamaica; Parsons Boulevard and Archer Avenue at Jamaica Center–Parsons/Archer ( trains)	↔	Rosedale; Conduit Avenue and Francis Lewis Boulevard at Rosedale LIRR station	All trips: Merrick Boulevard, Hook Creek Boulevard; Green Acres trips: Sunrise Highway	When limited-stop service is running, peak direction local buses begin/terminate at either 231st Street in Laurelton or Green Acres.; No overnight service to Green Acres.; No weekend service to the Rosedale station except during late nights.; Service from Rosedale station returns to Merrick Boulevard via Brookville Boulevard.
Q5*	NYCT	Jamaica; Parsons Boulevard and Archer Avenue at Jamaica Center–Parsons/Archer ( trains)	↔	Valley Stream, Nassau County; Green Acres Shopping Mall	All trips: Merrick Boulevard, Hook Creek Boulevard; Green Acres trips: Sunrise Highway	When limited-stop service is running, peak direction local buses begin/terminate at either 231st Street in Laurelton or Green Acres.; No overnight service to Green Acres.; No weekend service to the Rosedale station except during late nights.; Service from Rosedale station returns to Merrick Boulevard via Brookville Boulevard.
Q5*	NYCT	Limited-Stop Service				
Q5*	NYCT	Jamaica; Parsons Boulevard and Archer Avenue at Jamaica Center–Parsons/Archer ( trains)	← AM ---- → PM	Rosedale; 243rd Street and Francis Lewis Boulevard at Rosedale LIRR station	(See Q5 local routing above)	Weekday morning towards Jamaica and weekday afternoons towards Rosedale only.
Q6*	MTA Bus	Local Service				
Q6*	MTA Bus	Limited-Stop Service				
Q6*	MTA Bus	Jamaica; 168th Street Bus Terminal; Island A, Stand 4	↔	JFK International Airport; North Cargo Road and Eastern Road, and USPS Airport Mail Facility	Jamaica Avenue, Sutphin Boulevard, Rockaway Boulevard, North Boundary Road	Does not serve JFK passenger terminals.; Limited-stop service operates weekday mornings toward Jamaica and weekday afternoons toward JFK Airport only.
Q7	MTA Bus	East New York, Brooklyn; Euclid Avenue and Pitkin Avenue at Euclid Avenue ( trains)	↔	JFK International Airport; 148th Street and South Cargo Road	Pitkin Avenue, Rockaway Boulevard, 150th Street	Does not serve JFK passenger terminals.
Q8	MTA Bus	Jamaica; 168th Street Bus Terminal; Island B, Stand 4	↔	Spring Creek, Brooklyn; Gateway Center Mall	Jamaica Avenue, 101st Avenue, Fountain Avenue	Alternate rush hour buses terminate/start at Euclid Avenue and Pitkin Avenue ( trains)
Q9	MTA Bus	Jamaica; 168th Street Bus Terminal; Island B, Stand 5	↔	South Ozone Park; Rockaway Boulevard and Lincoln Street	Jamaica Avenue, Sutphin Boulevard, Liberty Avenue, 135th Street (Northbound), Van Wyck Expressway Service Road (Southbound), Lincoln Street.	
Q10*	MTA Bus	Local Service				
Q10*	MTA Bus	Kew Gardens; 80th Road and Kew Gardens Road at Kew Gardens–Union Turnpike ( trains)	↔	JFK International Airport; Lefferts Blvd Airtrain	Lefferts Boulevard, Rockaway Boulevard, 130th Street, Pan Am Road	Some daytime trips operate only between Kew Gardens and South Ozone Park, and do not enter the airport.
Q10*	MTA Bus	Limited-Stop Service				
Q10*	MTA Bus	Kew Gardens; 80th Road and Kew Gardens Road at Kew Gardens–Union Turnpike ( trains)	↔	JFK International Airport; Lefferts Blvd Airtrain	Lefferts Boulevard	No overnight limited-stop service.
Q11*	MTA Bus	Elmhurst; Queens Boulevard and Woodhaven Boulevard at Woodhaven Boulevard ( trains) and Queens Center Mall	↔	Old Howard Beach; 165th Avenue and 99th Street at Charles Park	Woodhaven Boulevard, Cross Bay Boulevard, then: Toward Old Howard Beach: 160th Avenue, 99th Street; Toward Hamilton Beach: 104th Street.	Weekday rush hours, some southbound service terminates at Pitkin Avenue and Cross Bay Boulevard in Ozone Park.; Overnights, the southern terminal is at Pitkin Avenue and Cross Bay Boulevard.
Q11*	MTA Bus	Elmhurst; Queens Boulevard and Woodhaven Boulevard at Woodhaven Boulevard ( trains) and Queens Center Mall	↔	Hamilton Beach; 165th Avenue and 104th Street	Woodhaven Boulevard, Cross Bay Boulevard, then: Toward Old Howard Beach: 160th Avenue, 99th Street; Toward Hamilton Beach: 104th Street.	Weekday rush hours, some southbound service terminates at Pitkin Avenue and Cross Bay Boulevard in Ozone Park.; Overnights, the southern terminal is at Pitkin Avenue and Cross Bay Boulevard.
Q12*	NYCT	Flushing; Roosevelt Avenue and Main Street at Flushing–Main Street ( trains)	↔	Little Neck; Glenwood Street and Northern Boulevard	Sanford Avenue, Northern Boulevard	Select Flushing-bound buses terminate at Northern Boulevard and 165th Street.
Q13	NYCT	Flushing; 39th Avenue and Union Street near Flushing–Main Street ( trains)	↔	Fort Totten; Fort Road and Cross Island Parkway	Northern Boulevard, Bell Boulevard	No overnight service.
Q15	NYCT	Flushing; Roosevelt Avenue and Lippmann Arcade at Flushing–Main Street ( trains)	↔	Beechhurst; 166th Street and Powells Cove Boulevard	41st Avenue, 150th Street, then: Q15: 154th Street; Q15A: Clintonville Street; All trips: Powells Cove Boulevard	No overnight service.
Q15A	NYCT	Flushing; Roosevelt Avenue and Lippmann Arcade at Flushing–Main Street ( trains)	↔	Beechhurst; 166th Street and Powells Cove Boulevard	41st Avenue, 150th Street, then: Q15: 154th Street; Q15A: Clintonville Street; All trips: Powells Cove Boulevard	No overnight service.
Q16	NYCT	Flushing; 39th Avenue and Union Street near Flushing–Main Street ( trains)	↔	Fort Totten; Fort Road and Cross Island Parkway	Bayside Avenue, 29th Avenue, then: Francis Lewis Boulevard – or –; Utopia Parkway	Trips alternate between each branch.
Q17*	NYCT	Local Service				
Q17*	NYCT	Limited-Stop Service				
Q17*	NYCT	Flushing; Main Street and 38th Avenue near Flushing–Main Street ( trains)	↔	Jamaica; Archer Avenue and Merrick Boulevard	Kissena Boulevard, Horace Harding Expressway, 188th Street, Hillside Avenue	Weekdays, some Jamaica-bound service terminates at 188th Street and Horace Harding Expressway in Fresh Meadows.; Limited-stop service operates during weekday rush hours in both directions.
Q18	MTA Bus	Astoria; 2nd Street and Astoria Boulevard	↔	Maspeth; 69th Street and Grand Avenue	30th Avenue, 58th Street, Woodside Avenue, 65th Place, 69th Street	No overnight service.
Q19	MTA Bus	Astoria; 2nd Street and Astoria Boulevard	↔	Flushing; Main Street and 39th Avenue near Flushing–Main Street ( trains)	Astoria Boulevard, Northern Boulevard	No evening and overnight service.
Q20A*	NYCT	Jamaica; Merrick Boulevard and Archer Avenue	↔	College Point; College Point Boulevard and 15th Avenue	All trips: Archer Avenue, Main Street, Union Street, then: Q20A: 20th Avenue; Q20B: 14th Avenue	Q20B operates weekdays only.
Q20B	NYCT	Jamaica; Merrick Boulevard and Archer Avenue	↔	College Point; College Point Boulevard and 15th Avenue	All trips: Archer Avenue, Main Street, Union Street, then: Q20A: 20th Avenue; Q20B: 14th Avenue	Q20B operates weekdays only.
Q21	MTA Bus	Elmhurst; Queens Boulevard and Woodhaven Boulevard at Woodhaven Boulevard ( trains) and Queens Center Mall	↔	Howard Beach; 164th Avenue and 92nd Street	Woodhaven Boulevard, 155th Avenue, 157th Avenue, Cross Bay Boulevard	Operates via 157th Avenue in Lindenwood between Howard Beach and Ozone Park.
Q22	MTA Bus	Far Rockaway; Mott Avenue and Beach 20th Street at Far Rockaway–Mott Avenue ( train)	↔	Roxbury; Beach 169th Street and Rockaway Point Boulevard	Beach Channel Drive, Rockaway Beach Boulevard	Summer service operates via Jacob Riis Park; Many daytime trips terminate and start at Rockaway Park–Beach 116th Street ( trains)
Q23	MTA Bus	East Elmhurst; 102nd Street and Ditmars Boulevard	↔	Forest Hills; Union Turnpike opposite Forest View Crescent Apartments	Ditmars Boulevard, 108th Street, 69th Avenue	
Q24*	NYCT	Jamaica; 168th Street and Archer Avenue	↔	Bedford–Stuyvesant, Brooklyn; Patchen Avenue and Broadway at Kosciuszko Street ( train)	Jamaica/Archer Avenues, Atlantic Avenue, Broadway (Brooklyn)	Some Saturday daytime service terminates at Broadway Junction ( trains)

==== Q25 to Q49 ====
Route	Operator	Terminals			Streets Traveled	Notes
Q25*	MTA Bus	Local Service				
Q25*	MTA Bus	Limited-Stop Service				
Q25*	MTA Bus	Jamaica; Sutphin Boulevard and 94th Avenue at Sutphin Boulevard–Archer Avenue–JFK Airport ( trains) and Jamaica LIRR/AirTrain Station	↔	College Point; Poppenhusen Avenue and 119th Street	Parsons Boulevard, Kissena Boulevard, 127th Street	Weekdays, Q34 also provides service between Flushing and Jamaica.; Limited-stop service operates rush hours only, making limited stops from Jamaica to Flushing-Main Street. Limited-stop service proposed for conversion into Select Bus Service route.
Q26	NYCT	Flushing; Roosevelt Avenue and Lippmann Arcade at Flushing–Main Street ( trains)	↔	Fresh Meadows	Parsons Boulevard, 46th Avenue, Hollis Court Boulevard	Weekday rush hour service only.
Q27*	NYCT	Local Service				
Q27*	NYCT	Limited-Stop Service				
Q27*	NYCT	Flushing; Main Street and 39th Avenue near Flushing–Main Street ( trains)	↔	Cambria Heights; Francis Lewis Boulevard and 120th Avenue	Kissena Boulevard, 46th Avenue, 47th Avenue, 48th Avenue, Springfield Boulevard	Some non-overnight trips short-turn in Queens Village.; Limited-stop service operates during weekday rush hours.; a.m. rush limited-stop service operates along the entire route.; p.m. rush limited-stop service begins in Flushing, running limited to Horace Harding Expressway, and local thereafter.; All limited-stop trips serve Queensborough Community College.
Q28*	NYCT	Flushing; 39th Avenue and Union Street at Flushing–Main Street ( trains)	↔	Bay Terrace; Shopping Center	Northern Boulevard, Crocheron Avenue, 32nd Avenue, Corporal Kennedy Street	
Q29	MTA Bus	Glendale; 81st Street and Myrtle Avenue	↔	Jackson Heights; 82nd Street and Roosevelt Avenue at 82nd Street–Jackson Heights ( train)	80th Street, Dry Harbor Road, 90th/92nd Streets	
Q30	NYCT	Jamaica; Archer Avenue and Sutphin Boulevard at Sutphin Boulevard–Archer Avenue–JFK Airport ( trains) and Jamaica LIRR/AirTrain Station	↔	Little Neck; Little Neck Parkway and Nassau Boulevard	All trips: Homelawn Street, Utopia Parkway, Horace Harding Expressway Bayside trips: Springfield Boulevard	No overnight service.; No early morning, night, or weekend service to Queensborough Community College.
Q30	NYCT	Jamaica; Archer Avenue and Sutphin Boulevard at Sutphin Boulevard–Archer Avenue–JFK Airport ( trains) and Jamaica LIRR/AirTrain Station	↔	Bayside; 56th Avenue and 223rd Street at Queensborough Community College and Benjamin N. Cardozo High School	All trips: Homelawn Street, Utopia Parkway, Horace Harding Expressway Bayside trips: Springfield Boulevard	No overnight service.; No early morning, night, or weekend service to Queensborough Community College.
Q31	NYCT	Jamaica; Archer Avenue and Sutphin Boulevard at Sutphin Boulevard–Archer Avenue–JFK Airport ( trains) and Jamaica LIRR/AirTrain Station	↔	Bayside; Francis Lewis Boulevard and 27th Avenue	Homelawn Street, Utopia Parkway, 47th Avenue, 48th Avenue, Bell Boulevard, 32nd Avenue	No overnight service.
Q32	NYCT	Penn Station, Midtown Manhattan; West 32nd Street and 7th Avenue	↔	Jackson Heights; Northern Boulevard and 81st Street	Madison Avenue/Fifth Avenue (Manhattan), Queens Boulevard, Roosevelt Avenue	Travels between Manhattan and Queens via the Queensboro Bridge.; Select Manhattan-bound buses terminate at 5th Avenue and either 57th Street or 42nd Street.
Q33*	MTA Bus	Jackson Heights; Jackson Heights–Roosevelt Avenue/74th Street ( trains); Bus terminal Lane 1	↔	East Elmhurst; Ditmars Boulevard and 94th Street	Roosevelt Avenue, 82nd/83rd Streets, 23rd Avenue	
Q34	MTA Bus	Jamaica; Sutphin Boulevard and 94th Avenue at Sutphin Boulevard–Archer Avenue–JFK Airport ( trains) and Jamaica LIRR/AirTrain Station	↔	Whitestone; Willets Point Boulevard and 149th Street	Parsons Boulevard, Kissena Boulevard, Union Street	Weekday service only.
Q35*	MTA Bus	Midwood, Brooklyn; Avenue H and Flatbush Avenue at Flatbush Avenue ( trains)	↔	Rockaway Park; Beach 116th Street and Newport Avenue at Rockaway Park–Beach 116th Street ( trains)	Flatbush Avenue, Newport Avenue	Summer service operates via Jacob Riis Park during daytime and evenings.; Travels between Brooklyn and Queens via the Marine Parkway–Gil Hodges Memorial Bridge.
Q36*	NYCT	Local Service				
Q36*	NYCT	Limited-Stop Service				
Q36*	NYCT	Jamaica; 168th Street Bus Terminal; Island B, Stand 1	↔	Floral Park; 257th Street and Jericho Turnpike	All trips: Hillside Avenue, 212th Place/212th Street, Jamaica Avenue/Jericho Turnpike; Little Neck trips: Little Neck Parkway	Service to Little Neck operates weekdays only.; Alternate weekday non-rush hour local and limited-stop buses serve each terminal.; Rush hour peak direction limited-stop service operates along Hillside Avenue.; Local buses do not operate in the peak direction when limited-stop buses are running, with non-peak direction locals to (in a.m.) or from (in p.m.) Little Neck.
Q36*	NYCT	Jamaica; 168th Street Bus Terminal; Island B, Stand 1	↔	Little Neck; 40th Avenue and Little Neck Parkway at Little Neck LIRR Station	All trips: Hillside Avenue, 212th Place/212th Street, Jamaica Avenue/Jericho Turnpike; Little Neck trips: Little Neck Parkway	Service to Little Neck operates weekdays only.; Alternate weekday non-rush hour local and limited-stop buses serve each terminal.; Rush hour peak direction limited-stop service operates along Hillside Avenue.; Local buses do not operate in the peak direction when limited-stop buses are running, with non-peak direction locals to (in a.m.) or from (in p.m.) Little Neck.
Q37	MTA Bus	Kew Gardens; Union Turnpike and Kew Gardens Road at Kew Gardens–Union Turnpike ( trains)	↔	South Ozone Park; 135th Road and 131st Street	Park Lane South, 111th Street, Aqueduct Racetrack trips: Aqueduct Road, then: 135th Avenue	No overnight service.; Aqueduct not served early a.m. hours.; Buses that bypass Aqueduct Racetrack are labeled Q37B.
Q38	MTA Bus	Forest Hills; 62nd Drive and 108th Street (South end)	↔	Corona; 60th Avenue and Otis Avenue (North end)	63rd Drive, Penelope Avenue, Metropolitan Avenue, Eliot Avenue	All service operates via Middle Village–Metropolitan Avenue ( train).
Q39*	MTA Bus	Long Island City; 28th Street and Queens Plaza South at Queensboro Plaza ( trains) and Queens Plaza ( trains)	↔	Glendale; Cooper Avenue and 60th Lane	48th Avenue, 58th Street, Forest Avenue	
Q40	MTA Bus	Jamaica; Sutphin Boulevard and Hillside Avenue at Sutphin Boulevard ( train)	↔	South Jamaica; 135th Avenue and 143rd Street	Sutphin Boulevard, Lakewood Avenue, 142nd Street	
Q41	MTA Bus	Jamaica; 168th Street Bus Terminal; Island A, Stand 5	↔	Howard Beach; 164th Avenue and 92nd Street	Jamaica Avenue, 127th Street, 109th Avenue, 155th Avenue, 157th Avenue, Cross Bay Boulevard	
Q42	NYCT	Jamaica; Archer Avenue and 158th Street at Jamaica Center–Parsons/Archer ( trains)	↔	Addisleigh Park; Sayres Avenue and 180th Street	Liberty Avenue, 174th Street, Sayres Avenue	Weekday service only.
Q43*	NYCT	Local Service				
Q43*	NYCT	Limited-Stop Service				
Q43*	NYCT	Jamaica; Archer Avenue and Sutphin Boulevard at Sutphin Boulevard–Archer Avenue–JFK Airport ( trains) and Jamaica LIRR/AirTrain Station	↔	Floral Park; 268th Street and Hillside Avenue	Sutphin Boulevard, Hillside Avenue (New York State Routes 25 and 25B)	Peak direction limited-stop service operates between 179th Street and Springfield Boulevard.; Local buses do not operate in the peak direction when limited-stop buses are running.
Q44*	NYCT	Select Bus Service				
Q44*	NYCT	Jamaica; Merrick Boulevard and Archer Avenue	↔	West Farms, Bronx; East 180th Street and Boston Road near Bronx Zoo and West Farms Square–East Tremont Avenue ( trains)	Archer Avenue, Main Street, Union Street, Parsons Boulevard, East 177th Street (Cross Bronx Expressway service road)	Travels between Queens and the Bronx via the Whitestone Expressway and Bronx–Whitestone Bridge.; Select Bronx-bound buses short-turn in Whitestone.
Q46*	NYCT	Local Service				
Q46*	NYCT	Limited-Stop Service				
Q46*	NYCT	Kew Gardens; Queens Boulevard and 78th Avenue at Kew Gardens–Union Turnpike ( trains)	↔	Lake Success, Nassau County; Long Island Jewish Medical Center	Union Turnpike	No stops within Long Island Jewish Hospital.; Limited-stop service operates during weekday rush hours: in both directions during the a.m. rush, and in the eastbound direction (toward 260th Street or Long Island Jewish Medical Center) during the p.m. rush.; During the a.m. rush: Westbound local service begins at Springfield Boulevard.; Westbound limited-stop service begins at either 260th Street or Long Island Jewish Hospital.; Eastbound local service ends at 260th Street.; Eastbound limited-stop service ends at Long Island Jewish Hospital.; During the p.m. rush: Westbound local service begins at either 260th Street or Long Island Jewish Hospital.; Eastbound limited-stop service ends alternately at either 260th Street or Long Island Jewish Hospital.; Eastbound local service ends at Springfield Boulevard.; At other times, local buses alternately terminate at 260th Street or Long Island Jewish Hospital.; No service to Glen Oaks via 260th Street overnights or weekends.
Q46*	NYCT	Kew Gardens; Queens Boulevard and 78th Avenue at Kew Gardens–Union Turnpike ( trains)	↔	Glen Oaks; 260th Street and Little Neck Parkway	Union Turnpike	
Q47	MTA Bus	LaGuardia Airport; Marine Air Terminal	↔	Glendale; The Shops at Atlas Park	82nd Street, 73rd/74th Streets, 69th Street, Calamus Avenue, 80th Street	
Q48	NYCT	Flushing; Roosevelt Avenue and Main Street at Flushing–Main Street ( trains)	↔	LaGuardia Airport; All terminals	Roosevelt Avenue, 108th Street, Ditmars Boulevard	
Q49	MTA Bus	Jackson Heights; Jackson Heights–Roosevelt Avenue/74th Street ( trains); Bus terminal Lane 2	↔	East Elmhurst; Astoria Boulevard and 102nd Street	35th Avenue, 89th/90th Streets, Astoria Boulevard	

==== Q50 to Q77 ====
Route	Operator	Terminals			Streets traveled	Notes
Q50	MTA Bus	Limited-Stop Service				
Q50	MTA Bus	Flushing; Main Street and 39th Avenue near Flushing–Main Street ( trains)	↔	Pelham Bay, Bronx; Bruckner Boulevard at Pelham Bay Park ( trains)	All trips: Whitestone Expressway, Hutchinson River Parkway, Bruckner Boulevard; Co-op City trips: Co-op City Boulevard	Operates to Pelham Bay during non-rush hours.; Operates during rush hours to and in Co-op City via Co-op City Boulevard.; Customers from Queens traveling to Sections 1 (Dreiser Loop) or 4 (Asch Loop) must transfer to a Bx23 bus at Pelham Bay Park.; Travels between Queens and the Bronx via the Bronx–Whitestone Bridge.
Q50	MTA Bus	Flushing; Main Street and 39th Avenue near Flushing–Main Street ( trains)	↔	Co-op City, Bronx; Earhart Lane and Erskine Place	All trips: Whitestone Expressway, Hutchinson River Parkway, Bruckner Boulevard; Co-op City trips: Co-op City Boulevard	Operates to Pelham Bay during non-rush hours.; Operates during rush hours to and in Co-op City via Co-op City Boulevard.; Customers from Queens traveling to Sections 1 (Dreiser Loop) or 4 (Asch Loop) must transfer to a Bx23 bus at Pelham Bay Park.; Travels between Queens and the Bronx via the Bronx–Whitestone Bridge.
Q52	MTA Bus	Select Bus Service				
Q52	MTA Bus	Elmhurst; Queens Boulevard and Woodhaven Boulevard at Woodhaven Boulevard ( trains) and Queens Center Mall	↔	Arverne; Beach 54th Street and Beach Channel Drive	Woodhaven Boulevard, Cross Bay Boulevard, Rockaway Beach Boulevard	Select Arverne-bound bound buses short-turn at Cross Bay Boulevard and 163rd Avenue.
Q53*	MTA Bus	Select Bus Service				
Q53*	MTA Bus	Woodside; 61st Street and Roosevelt Avenue at 61st Street–Woodside subway ( trains) and Woodside LIRR station	↔	Rockaway Park; Beach 116th Street at Rockaway Park–Beach 116th Street station ( trains)	Broadway, Woodhaven Boulevard, Cross Bay Boulevard, Rockaway Beach Boulevard	Select Rockaway Park-bound buses short-turn at Cross Bay Boulevard and 163rd Avenue.
Q54*	NYCT	Williamsburg, Brooklyn; Williamsburg Bridge Plaza; Lane 2	↔	Jamaica; 170th Street and Jamaica Avenue	Grand Street, Metropolitan Avenue, Jamaica Avenue	
Q55*	NYCT	Ridgewood Intermodal Terminal at Myrtle–Wyckoff Avenues ( trains)	↔	Richmond Hill; Jamaica Avenue and Myrtle Avenue	Myrtle Avenue	Select Richmond Hill-bound buses short-turn at Woodhaven Boulevard.
Q56*	NYCT	East New York, Brooklyn; Broadway and Fulton Street at Broadway Junction ( trains)	↔	Jamaica; 170th Street and Jamaica Avenue	Jamaica Avenue	
Q58*	NYCT	Local Service				
Q58*	NYCT	Limited-Stop Service				
Q58*	NYCT	Ridgewood Intermodal Terminal at Myrtle–Wyckoff Avenues ( trains)	↔	Flushing; 41st Road and Main Street near Flushing–Main Street ( trains)	Fresh Pond Road, Grand Avenue, Corona Avenue, College Point Boulevard	Bidirectional limited-stop service during weekday rush hours and weekends. No weekday midday limited-stop service.; Select Flushing-bound buses short-turn at 108th Street and Horace Harding Expressway and select Ridgewood-bound buses terminate at Fresh Pond Road and Putnam Avenue.
Q59*	NYCT	Williamsburg, Brooklyn; Williamsburg Bridge Plaza (Broadway and Roebling Street)	↔	Rego Park; Junction Boulevard and Horace Harding Expressway at 63rd Drive–Rego Park ( trains)	Grand Street, Grand Avenue, Queens Boulevard	
Q60*	MTA Bus	East Midtown, Manhattan; East 60th Street and 2nd Avenue	↔	South Jamaica; 109th Avenue and 157th Street	Queens Boulevard, Sutphin Boulevard	Travels between Manhattan and Queens via the Queensboro Bridge; Alternate daytime and early evening buses terminate/start at Sutphin Boulevard ( trains, LIRR, AirTrain)
Q64*	MTA Bus	Forest Hills; Queens Boulevard and 71st Avenue at Forest Hills–71st Avenue ( trains)	↔	Electchester; 164th Street and Jewel Avenue	Jewel Avenue	
Q65*	MTA Bus	Local Service				
Q65*	MTA Bus	Limited-Stop Service				
Q65*	MTA Bus	Jamaica; Sutphin Boulevard and 94th Avenue at Sutphin Boulevard–Archer Avenue–JFK Airport ( trains) and Jamaica LIRR / AirTrain Station	↔	College Point; 14th Avenue and 110th Street	164th Street, 45th Avenue, College Point Boulevard	Limited-stop service operates rush hours only, making limited stops from Jamaica to Flushing-Main Street.
Q66*	MTA Bus	Long Island City; 28th Street and Queens Plaza South at Queensboro Plaza ( trains) and Queens Plaza ( trains)	↔	Flushing; Main Street and 39th Avenue near Flushing–Main Street ( trains)	21st Street, 35th Avenue, Northern Boulevard	Alternate rush hour buses to/from Flushing begin/end at 51st Street in Woodside.
Q67	MTA Bus	Long Island City; 28th Street and Queens Plaza South at Queensboro Plaza ( trains) and Queens Plaza ( trains)	↔	Middle Village; Metropolitan Avenue and Fresh Pond Road	21st Street, Borden Avenue, 55th Avenue, 69th Street, Metropolitan Avenue	
Q69	MTA Bus	Long Island City; 28th Street and Queens Plaza South at Queensboro Plaza ( trains) and Queens Plaza ( trains)	↔	Jackson Heights; 82nd Street and Astoria Boulevard	21st Street, Ditmars Boulevard	
Q70*	MTA Bus	Select Bus Service				
Q70*	MTA Bus	Woodside; Woodside Avenue and 61st Street (last drop-off), 62nd Street and Roosevelt Avenue (first pick-up) at 61st Street–Woodside subway ( trains) and Woodside LIRR station	↺	LaGuardia Airport; Central Terminals	Roosevelt Avenue/Woodside Avenue, Brooklyn-Queens Expressway, Grand Central Parkway	One intermediate stop at Jackson Heights-Roosevelt Avenue/74th Street ( trains); Fare-free service since May 2022.
Q72	MTA Bus	Rego Park; 64th Road and Queens Boulevard at 63rd Drive–Rego Park ( trains)	↔	LaGuardia Airport; Central Terminals	Junction Boulevard, 94th Street	
Q76	NYCT	Jamaica; 168th Street Bus Terminal; Island B, Stand 2	↔	College Point; 20th Avenue and 131st Street	Hillside Avenue, Francis Lewis Boulevard, 20th Avenue	No overnight service.
Q77	NYCT	Jamaica; 168th Street Bus Terminal; Island B, Stand 3	↔	Springfield Gardens; Springfield Boulevard and 145th Avenue	Hillside Avenue, Francis Lewis Boulevard, Springfield Boulevard	No overnight service.

==== Q83 to Q114 ====
Route	Operator	Terminals			Streets traveled	Notes
Q83*	NYCT	Local Service				
Q83*	NYCT	Jamaica; 153rd Street and Hillside Avenue at Parsons Boulevard ( trains)	↔	Cambria Heights; 114th Avenue and 227th Street	Liberty Avenue, Murdock Avenue	Overnights extended to Queens Village LIRR Station via Springfield Boulevard.; During p.m. rush, local service terminates at Colfax Street when Limited-stop service is operating.
Q83*	NYCT	Jamaica; 153rd Street and Hillside Avenue at Parsons Boulevard ( trains)	↔	Cambria Heights; Colfax Street and Springfield Boulevard	Liberty Avenue, Murdock Avenue	Overnights extended to Queens Village LIRR Station via Springfield Boulevard.; During p.m. rush, local service terminates at Colfax Street when Limited-stop service is operating.
Q83*	NYCT	Limited-Stop Service				
Q83*	NYCT	Jamaica; 153rd Street and Hillside Avenue at Parsons Boulevard ( trains) (PM rush), Archer Avenue and 153rd St at Jamaica Center–Parsons/Archer ( trains) (AM rush)	← AM ---- → PM	Cambria Heights; 114th Avenue and 227th Street	(See Q83 local routing above)	Peak-direction limited-stop service makes limited stops between Jamaica and 113th Avenue.
Q84	NYCT	Jamaica; Parsons Boulevard and Archer Avenue at Jamaica Center–Parsons/Archer ( trains)	↔	Laurelton; 238th Street and 130th Avenue	Merrick Boulevard, 120th Avenue	
Q85*	NYCT	Local Service				
Q85*	NYCT	Jamaica; Parsons Boulevard and Archer Avenue at Jamaica Center–Parsons/Archer ( trains)	↔	Rosedale; 243rd Street and 147th Avenue	Merrick Boulevard, Bedell Street, South/North Conduit Avenue, then: Toward Rosedale: 243rd Street; Toward Green Acres: Green Acres Road	Extended to Green Acres Mall after the a.m. rush.; Peak-direction limited-stop service.
Q85*	NYCT	Jamaica; Parsons Boulevard and Archer Avenue at Jamaica Center–Parsons/Archer ( trains)	↔	Valley Stream, Nassau County; Green Acres Shopping Mall	Merrick Boulevard, Bedell Street, South/North Conduit Avenue, then: Toward Rosedale: 243rd Street; Toward Green Acres: Green Acres Road	Extended to Green Acres Mall after the a.m. rush.; Peak-direction limited-stop service.
Q85*	NYCT	Limited-Stop Service				
Q85*	NYCT	Jamaica; Parsons Boulevard and Archer Avenue at Jamaica Center–Parsons/Archer ( trains)	← AM ---- → PM	Rosedale; 243rd Street and 147th Avenue	(See Q85 Rosedale routing above)	Weekday limited-stop service to Jamaica (in a.m. hours) and to Rosedale (in p.m. hours).
Q88	NYCT	Elmhurst; 92nd Street and 59th Avenue at Woodhaven Boulevard ( trains) and Queens Center Mall	↔	Queens Village; Jamaica Avenue and Springfield Boulevard at Queens Village LIRR station	Horace Harding Expressway, 188th Street, 73rd Avenue, Springfield Boulevard	
Q100*	MTA Bus	Limited-Stop Service				
Q100*	MTA Bus	Long Island City; Jackson Avenue and Queens Plaza South at Queensboro Plaza ( trains) and Queens Plaza ( trains)	↔	Rikers Island, Bronx	21st Street, 20th Avenue	
Q101*	MTA Bus	East Midtown, Manhattan; East 60th Street and 2nd Avenue	↔	Steinway; 77th Street and Hazen Street	Northern Boulevard, Steinway Street, 20th Avenue	Travels between Manhattan and Queens via the Queensboro Bridge.
Q102	MTA Bus	Roosevelt Island, Manhattan; Coler–Goldwater Hospital	↔	Astoria; 27th Avenue and 2nd Street	Main Street (Manhattan), Vernon Boulevard, 31st Street, 30th Avenue	Travels between Manhattan and Queens via the Roosevelt Island Bridge.
Q103	MTA Bus	Hunters Point; Borden Avenue and Vernon Boulevard at Vernon Boulevard–Jackson Avenue ( trains) and Long Island City LIRR station	↔	Astoria; 27th Avenue and 2nd Street	Vernon Boulevard	
Q104	MTA Bus	Ravenswood; Vernon Boulevard and 34th Avenue	↔	Sunnyside; 48th Street and Queens Boulevard at 46th Street–Bliss Street ( train)	Broadway, 48th Street	
Q110*	MTA Bus	Jamaica; 88th Avenue and Parsons Boulevard at Parsons Boulevard ( trains)	↔	Elmont, Nassau County; UBS Arena/Belmont Park	Jamaica Avenue, Hempstead Avenue	Jamaica-179th Street served during peak-hours only.; Service to UBS Arena/Belmont Park is when either venue is open. Otherwise, buses start/end at Hempstead Avenue and 225 Street.
Q110*	MTA Bus	Jamaica; 179th Street and Hillside Avenue at Jamaica–179th Street ( trains)	← AM ---- → PM	Elmont, Nassau County; UBS Arena/Belmont Park	Jamaica Avenue, Hempstead Avenue	Jamaica-179th Street served during peak-hours only.; Service to UBS Arena/Belmont Park is when either venue is open. Otherwise, buses start/end at Hempstead Avenue and 225 Street.
Q111*	MTA Bus	Jamaica; Parsons Boulevard and Hillside Avenue at Parsons Boulevard ( trains)	↔	Rosedale; 147th Avenue and Hook Creek Boulevard	All trips: Guy R. Brewer Boulevard, 147th Avenue Cedarhurst trips: Rosedale Road, Peninsula Boulevard	Alternate daytime trips terminate at Farmers Boulevard; Cedarhurst service: Weekday mornings, one southbound trip to Cedarhurst.; Weekday evenings, one northbound trip to Jamaica.
Q111*	MTA Bus	Jamaica; Parsons Boulevard and Hillside Avenue at Parsons Boulevard ( trains)	→ AM ---- ← PM	Cedarhurst, Nassau County; Peninsula Boulevard and Rockaway Turnpike	All trips: Guy R. Brewer Boulevard, 147th Avenue Cedarhurst trips: Rosedale Road, Peninsula Boulevard	Alternate daytime trips terminate at Farmers Boulevard; Cedarhurst service: Weekday mornings, one southbound trip to Cedarhurst.; Weekday evenings, one northbound trip to Jamaica.
Q112	MTA Bus	Jamaica; Parsons Boulevard and 88th Avenue at Parsons Boulevard ( trains)	↔	Ozone Park; Rockaway Boulevard and 98th Street at Rockaway Boulevard ( train)	South Road, Liberty Avenue	
Q113	MTA Bus	Limited-Stop Service				
Q113	MTA Bus	Jamaica; Parsons Boulevard and 88th Avenue at Parsons Boulevard ( trains)	↔	Far Rockaway; Seagirt Boulevard and Beach 20th Street	Guy R. Brewer Boulevard, Rockaway Boulevard, Nassau Expressway, Central Avenue, Beach 9th Street	Service operates via Lawrence in Nassau County; Buses run express between Springfield Gardens and Far Rockaway, with a stop in Meadowmere, Queens and one on the Queens side of Five Towns on Rockaway Boulevard.
Q114*	MTA Bus	Local Service (Evenings and Late Nights)				
Q114*	MTA Bus	Limited-Stop Service				
Q114*	MTA Bus	Jamaica; Parsons Boulevard and 88th Avenue at Parsons Boulevard ( trains)	↔	Far Rockaway; Seagirt Boulevard and Beach 20th Street	Guy R. Brewer Boulevard, 147th Avenue, Rockaway Turnpike, Wanser Avenue, Beach Channel Drive, Beach 9th Street	Service toward Far Rockaway operates local in the Lawrence, Cedarhurst, and Inwood neighborhoods in Nassau County.

== Former routes ==
Below are the list of former Queens bus routes, including the previous route designations of current routes. Several route numbers for NYCTA buses in Queens and other boroughs were changed on July 1, 1974. On December 11, 1988, when the Archer Avenue lines opened to Jamaica Center–Parsons/Archer station, some of the Brooklyn "B" routes that operate primarily in Queens were redesignated as "Q" routes, and a number of other routes were renumbered or modified. Most of the former routes are operated by NYCTA; some were operated by private companies in Queens.

Route	Terminals		Major streets	History
Q3A	Became the Q83 on December 11, 1988			
Q4A	Became the Q84 on December 11, 1988			
Q5A	Rosedale	Jamaica	243rd Street, Conduit Avenue, Farmers Boulevard, Merrick Boulevard	On September 13, 1987, the NYCTA implemented a series of service reductions in Southeast Queens, including the combination of the Q5A, which ran to 243rd Street and 147th Avenue in Rosedale via Conduit Avenue, with the Q5AB Bedell Street route, which ran to Rochdale, to form the Q85, with reduced service on Merrick Boulevard. These routes were operated as a single service during late evenings and early mornings.
Q5AB	Locust Manor LIRR station, Springfield Gardens	Jamaica	Bedell Street, Merrick Boulevard	On September 13, 1987, the NYCTA implemented a series of service reductions in Southeast Queens, including the combination of the Q5A, which ran to 243rd Street and 147th Avenue in Rosedale via Conduit Avenue, with the Q5AB Bedell Street route, which ran to Rochdale, to form the Q85, with reduced service on Merrick Boulevard. These routes were operated as a single service during late evenings and early mornings.
Q5AS	Rosedale	Laurelton	147th Avenue, 225th Street	Originally numbered the Q5ALS; discontinued on December 11, 1988
Q5S	Became the Q86 on December 11, 1988. See below for more information.			
Q9A	Became the second version of the Q89 on April 7, 2008. See below for more information.			
Q10A	Kew Gardens	JFK Airport	Van Wyck Expressway	Six trips to JFK Airport only in weekday morning hours, express service; became Q10 Limited stop service in 2006.; Originally operated by Green Bus Lines then MTA Bus in 2005.
Q12A	Became the Q79 on April 15, 1990. See below for more information.			
Q14 (first use)	Flushing–Main Street	Whitestone	Union Street, 149th Street, 150th Street	Replaced former New York and North Shore Traction Company Whitestone Trolley Line; On July 11, 1966, the NYCTA moved the terminals of the Q13, Q14, Q16, Q28, and Q44FS from downtown Flushing to the Flushing Parking Field surrounded by 37th Avenue, Union Street, 138th Street, and 39th Avenue on a six-month pilot basis. The change, which was made at the request of multiple Queens elected officials, was intended to provide shelter for riders and reduce downtown congestion. However, due to immediate opposition from shoppers, who complained that the change forced them to walk four blocks to get from the subway to the buses, businessmen, and elected officials, on July 20, 1966, the NYCTA announced that it would undo the change on July 24. Q13, Q16, and Q28 service would go back to terminating on the north side of Roosevelt Avenue to the east of Main Street, while Q14 and Q44FS service would resume terminating on the east side of Main Street at 39th Avenue.; In December 2000, the MTA announced a proposed extension to the route to 150th Street and Third Avenue in Whitestone to provide service one- and two-family homes that were newly developed on a former country club between Seventh Avenue and Third Avenue, and to eliminate the route's problematic existing turnaround in a residential neighborhood at its terminal at Clintonville Street and Seventh Avenue. Buses had to turn around a small traffic island on a steep hill by making a right turn from Seventh Avenue to Clintonville Street, a left onto 151st Street, and then a left onto Seventh Avenue. Instead of turning east onto Seventh Avenue, buses would continue north along 150th Street to a new terminal at Third Avenue. Southbound buses would turn west on Third Avenue, south on 149th Street east on Fifth Avenue, and then turn back south onto 150th Street. The extension had been requested by Community Board 7 on behalf of residents of the new housing. A customer survey found that 25 percent of riders who boarded the bus on Seventh Avenue lived north of Sixth Avenue. The extension was expected to cost $10,000 a year, and was to take effect in March 2001.; Discontinued on June 27, 2010, due to budget crisis.; Partially replaced by the Q15A
Q17A	Became the Q30 on December 11, 1988			
Q18X	Service began on August 2, 1971, and later became the X18, and then the X68 on April 15, 1990			
Q19A	Became the second version of the Q69 on April 20, 2008.			
Q19B	Became the second version of the Q49 on April 20, 2008.			
Q20X	Service began in October 1971, and later became the X20, and then the X63 on April 15, 1990			
Q21	Howard Beach	Elmhurst; Queens Boulevard and Woodhaven Boulevard at Woodhaven Boulevard ( trains) and Queens Center Mall	Cross Bay Boulevard, Woodhaven Boulevard	Discontinued on August 31, 2025 due to the Queens Bus Redesign, merged with the Q11
Q21A	Far Rockaway	East New York, Brooklyn	Edgemere Avenue, Cross Bay Boulevard, Pitkin Avenue, Linden Boulevard	Discontinued in 1990 due to poor ridership.; Operated by Green Bus Lines
Q22A	Far Rockaway–Mott Avenue subway station, Far Rockaway	Bayswater	Mott Avenue	Began service in 1944.; Operated by Green Bus Lines until MTA takeover in 2005.; Discontinued in fall 2008.; Operated one morning trip to Mott Avenue and one afternoon trip to Bayswater only.
Q24 (first use)	Grand Avenue	Woodside	65th Place	Now part of the Q18; operated by Triboro Coach Corporation.
Q24X	Service began in October 1971, and later became the X24, and then the X64 on April 15, 1990			
Q30 (first use)	Fresh Meadows	Jamaica	188th Street	On November 29, 1956, the NYCTA approved a large number of changes to city bus service to take effect January 22, 1957. One of the changes was to extend the Q17 to replace Q30 service. The change would eliminate duplication with the Q25 bus route of the Queens-Nassau Transit company between Jamaica and College Point. The change took effect on February 3, 1957, and the route was discontinued.
Q31A	Bayside; 201st Street and 32nd Avenue	Queens Village LIRR station	Bell Boulevard, Springfield Boulevard	In March 1949, the Greater Bayside Bus Coordinating Committee was organized at the request of Greater Bayside Citizens Association, with representatives from local civic groups. It created a plan for improvements in bus service, with the main element being proposed crosstown bus service on Springfield Boulevard. The Oakland Gardens Civic Association and the Businessmen's Association were the groups that led the push for Springfield Boulevard service.; On October 27, 1949, Queens Borough President Maurice A. FitzGerald sent a letter to Transportation Commissioner William Ried on October 27, 1949, detailing his strong support for the proposed routes on Springfield Boulevard.; On April 4, 1950, the Board of Estimate approved plans from the Board of Transportation to extend the Q27 2.5 miles along Springfield Boulevard, and to create a new branch of the Q31, the Q31A, running along Springfield Boulevard between Queens Village and Bayside West. The route would be 5.4 miles long. It was expected that the changes would be implemented in two weeks. FitzGerald stated that his initial request that the line along Springfield Boulevard head to Merrick Road was not implemented due to sewer construction, and that he would again request that the full extension be implemented after that work was completed.; Service, also known as the Bayside West-Queens Village route, began on April 30, 1950, via Bell Boulevard and Springfield Boulevard.; Combined with the Q31 and discontinued on February 3, 1957.
Q32 (first use)	Creedmoor Psychiatric Center	Queens Village LIRR station	Winchester Boulevard; 222nd Street and Jamaica Avenue (original route); Hillside Avenue and Springfield Boulevard (post-1945 route)	Began operation in 1930 under Lund Coach, before being transferred to Nevin-Queens Bus Corporation on July 4, 1934.; From February 17, 1935, to November 9, 1936, the route was operated by North Shore Bus Company.; Z & M Coach Company then operated the route until June 30, 1939, and North Shore Bus Company again until city takeover in 1947.; Sunday service on the Q32 was discontinued on February 3, 1957.; On June 25, 1959, the Board of Estimate requested that the NYCTA hold a public hearing on the proposal to discontinue the bus route. The public hearing was held on July 6, 1959, and the route was discontinued on July 24, 1959, due to low ridership. In 1958, only 3,258 passengers used the route, down from 14,148 in 1954.
Q33A	Astoria; Ditmars Boulevard station	Jackson Heights/East Elmhurst	Ditmars Boulevard	Later became the Q51; now part of the Q69; operated by Triboro Coach Corporation.
Q34	Jamaica	Whitestone	Parsons Boulevard, Kissena Boulevard, Union Street	Service began in April 1933.; Formerly operated by Queens-Nassau Transit Lines, Queens Transit Corporation, and Queens Surface Corporation.; The original Q34 route was the College Point segment of the Q25; it was later rerouted to its current alignment in Whitestone and then extended along the Q25 route.; On April 17, 2000, the span of weekday evening service on the route was changed, with bus service ending at 9 p.m. instead of midnight, and Saturday service was eliminated due to low ridership at these times. In addition, service now began at 5:30 a.m. on weekdays and was cut to running from 149th Street and Willets Point Boulevard to Main Street and Roosevelt Avenue.; Southern terminus was moved from 160th Street and Jamaica Avenue to Parsons Boulevard and Jamaica Avenue in 2004.; Service extended to Jamaica LIRR station on Sutphin Boulevard in 2007.; Discontinued on June 29, 2025, with the Queens bus redesign.
Q35 (first use)	Flushing–Main Street	College Point/ Whitestone	Linden Place, 127th Street, 14th Avenue	Operated by North Shore Bus Company; Began service on February 15, 1932, as replacement for LIRR's Whitestone Branch.; Discontinued in 1937; merged into the Q20 and replaced by the Q25.
Q44A	Became the Q46 on April 15, 1990.			
Q44B	Whitestone; Parsons Boulevard and 14th Avenue or Whitestone Expressway and 15th Avenue	Malba; Third Avenue and Whitestone Parkway	14th Avenue, 147th Street, Third Avenue	"Malba Shuttle" or "Malba Gardens Line" on Parsons Boulevard; Franchise approved September 14, 1950; began service on October 9, 1950.; Saturday service was eliminated on September 26, 1959.; Between 1980 and 1985, northbound buses were rerouted off of 147th Street between 12th Avenue and 3rd Avenue; On September 21, 1989, the NYCTA held a public hearing for its proposed discontinuation of the route. Speakers at the public hearing said that ridership on the route would increase significantly if it ran during middays, and that some people would have to walk at least a mile to get to stops on the Q44. The 2.1 miles (3.4 km)-long route ran between Third Avenue near the Whitestone Expressway and 14th Avenue and Parsons Boulevard. The route was scheduled to be discontinued due to low ridership; it was used by an average of 67 to 95 passengers per day. Service on the route ran between 7 and 9 a.m. and 2:48 and 7 p.m., and did not operate on weekends. The route ran 18 trips per day, and was well below the MTA's loading guidelines. Within the following two months, the proposal was sent to the MTA board for approval.; Discontinued in 1990; was to become the Q71 on April 15, 1990
Q44FS	Became the Q20 on April 15, 1990.			
Q44VP	Became the Q74 on April 15, 1990. See below for more information.			
Q45 (first use)	Jackson Heights	The Shops at Atlas Park	Roosevelt Avenue, 69th Street, Calamus Avenue, 80th Street	Operated by Triboro Coach Corporation prior to MTA takeover.; Extended from Eliot Avenue to Glendale at The Shops at Atlas Park on August 31, 2008.; Merged into an extended Q47 on September 4, 2011.
Q45X	Rego Park; Woodhaven Boulevard and Queens Boulevard / Rego Center	Middle Village; 69th Street	Eliot Avenue	Operated by Triboro Coach Corporation; Q45X short for "Q45 Extension".; This later became the first version of Q50; now part of the Q38.
Q45X	Corona; 98th Street and 60th Avenue	Middle Village; 69th Street	Eliot Avenue	Operated by Triboro Coach Corporation; Q45X short for "Q45 Extension".; This later became the first version of Q50; now part of the Q38.
Q46 (first use)	Sunnyside	Corona	Roosevelt Avenue, 111th Street	Operated by Triboro Coach Corporation; Discontinued in 1952.
Q48 (first use)	Flushing	LaGuardia Airport	Roosevelt Avenue, 108th Street, Ditmars Boulevard	North Shore Bus Company began this route on April 5, 1940.; Transferred to New York City Transit in 1947.; On March 4, 1979, the span of Sunday morning service was increased, with service from the airport starting at 9:30 a.m. instead of 11 a.m., and service to the airport starting at 9:00 a.m. instead of 11 a.m.. Service would run at 30-minute headways during these hours.; In January 2000, the MTA announced that it would make a terminal reroute for LaGuardia Airport-bound bus service in Downtown Flushing to reduce delays by rerouting off of congested Prince Street and eliminating two difficult turns. One was a left turn to Prince Street from 39th Avenue, while the other was a right turn to Roosevelt Avenue from Prince Street. The change would reroute Q48 service to continue along 39th Avenue past Prince Street to Janet Place, make a left turn along Janet Place, and make a right turn onto Roosevelt Avenue, resuming its former route. The reroute provided service to a large supermarket at 39th Avenue and Janet Place that had no service. The change was to take effect the same month.; Q48 service was rerouted again in 2013, with service on Roosevelt Avenue from Main Street to Janet Place, ending the reroute via the supermarket on Janet Place.; Discontinued on June 29, 2025, with the Queens bus redesign (replaced with the new route Q90). The Q48 label was retained and applied to the former Q46 260th Street short-turn service.
Q49 (first use)	Richmond Hill	Jamaica	Jamaica Avenue	Started in September 1977 as a shuttle to provide interim service for discontinued BMT Jamaica Line service from Queens Boulevard to 168th Street.; In April 1985, the service began to run from 121st Street to 168th Street.; Discontinued on December 11, 1988, with the opening of the Archer Avenue Subway. Former route covered by current Q56, and J/Z subway train service.
Q50 (first use)	Middle Village; 69th Street	Elmhurst; Woodhaven Boulevard and Queens Boulevard / Rego Center	Eliot Avenue	Originally the Q45X; merged into the Q38 on July 3, 1960; Operated by Triboro Coach Corporation.
Q51 (first use)	Astoria; Ditmars Boulevard station	Jackson Heights / East Elmhurst; 82nd Street	Ditmars Boulevard	Originally the Q33A.; Merged into Q19A circa 1960; Operated by Triboro Coach Corporation.
Q52 (first use)	Became the Q19B (now current Q49); operated by Triboro Coach Corporation.			
Q57	Queensbridge; 21st Street and 41st Avenue	LaGuardia Airport		Operated by Two Borough Express Incorporated, a subsidiary of Triboro Coach. The subsidiary was created to simplify bidding for the route, which did not receive a public subsidy. Within the contract for the one-year franchise for the route was a clause allowing for the cancellation of the route with a six months' notice, included in part because of the fear of subway crime on the part of the president of Two Boroughs Express. The president hoped to give the route at least a year, and hoped that the route would be used by at least 2,000 passengers per day. Six buses were bought from Triboro Coach for the service. It cost $122,000 to start up the service.; Service began on September 17, 1990, with a $5 fare and operated between 6 a.m. and 11 p.m., every 20 minutes and 7 days a week.; Nicknamed "QT" bus route, with the QT short for LaGuardia Express Quick Trip.; The bus followed a 6.1-mile-long (9.8 km) route, and took 20 minutes to complete a trip.; The route was marketed toward business travelers looking for a cheaper way to get to the Airports, and was intended to be an alternative to cabs and airport buses from Manhattan.; Service was discontinued in May 1991.
Q65A	Became the Q64 on September 2, 2007.			
Q69 (first use)	Hunters Point Ferry	Long Island City	Borden Avenue, 49th Avenue	Operated by Queens Surface.; Fare free, weekday rush hour service.; Service was discontinued in 2002 due to poor ridership.
Q74 (first use)	Kew Gardens–Union Turnpike subway station	Queens College	Vleigh Place, Main Street, Kissena Boulevard, Melbourne Avenue	North Shore Bus Company began operating the Q44VP on October 14, 1940.; Renumbered to the Q74 on April 15, 1990.; Discontinued on June 27, 2010, due to budget crisis.
Q75 (first use)	Jamaica	Oakland Gardens	Hillside Avenue, 188th Street, 73rd Avenue, Springfield Boulevard, 69th Avenue, Cloverdale Boulevard	Service was begun, by the New York City Board of Transportation, on a temporary basis on April 28, 1952, before permanent bus service started on May 4, 1952.; Sunday service was discontinued on February 3, 1959.; In August 1979, the NYCTA proposed eliminating Saturday bus service because of their low usage, with 13 riders per trip, and to save $60,000 annually. This was proposed as part of a series of cuts to save $1.4 million. Saturday service ran every 20 minutes between 5:30 a.m. and 1:30 a.m. The public hearing was held on September 12, 1979. On September 19, 1979, in response to a campaign in opposition to the change, led by State Senator Gary Ackerman and Rose Simon, who chaired an "Ad Hoc Committee to Save the Q75", the NYCTA agreed to continue operating Saturday service on the route.; On December 11, 1988, the route was extended from 179th Street station to the 165th Street Terminal in conjunction with the opening of the Archer Avenue Line.; On June 15, 1989, a public hearing was held on the planned elimination of Saturday service. Saturday service ran every 30 minutes between 5:30 a.m. and 1:20 a.m.. The average ridership on Saturday was five passengers per trip. The NYCTA noted that there was frequent bus service on alternate routes. The annual cost saving was $72,000.; In December 1990, local officials stated that the route could be one of the routes to be cut by the NYCTA as part of its $25 million citywide cut in bus service and asked the president of the NYCTA to hold a public hearing. While a TA spokesman denied that the Q75 was part of the plan, the head of Amalgamated Transit Union local 1056, Jerry Fancher, said that he saw an interdepartmental memo saying that service on the route would be cut.; On February 4, 1991, a public hearing was held on the planned span reduction on the Q75, which was to be part of the 1991 Service Plan. At the meeting, the public requested that midday service be maintained to provide a connection to shopping and the subway. Some suggested that it be replaced by an extension of the Q65A, but this was dismissed since it was operated by Queens Surface.; While the original proposal called for greater cuts on the route, the proposal presented to the MTA Board in May 1994 affected fewer passengers. The proposal would have eliminated late evening service between 9:00 p.m. and 1:20 a.m., which was only used by 15 passengers, or an average of fewer than a person per trip. The proposal was set to go into effect in September 1994, limiting the route's hours of operation to 5:30 a.m. to 9:00 p.m., saving $100,000 annually.; Discontinued on June 27, 2010, due to budget crisis.
Q79	Little Neck LIRR Station	Floral Park	Little Neck Parkway	Sunday service was discontinued on February 3, 1959.; Formerly Q12A; renumbered on April 15, 1990.; Discontinued on June 27, 2010, due to budget crisis.; Route restored by select extended Q36 weekday trips in January 2013.
Q80 (first use)	South Jamaica; Sayres Avenue and Merrick Boulevard	South Ozone Park; Lefferts Boulevard and Liberty Avenue	Linden Boulevard	Experimental bus route. Originally scheduled for three months from September 8, 1969, to December 1969. The route was extended for another three months. Although the route was scheduled to be discontinued on March 5, 1970, the pilot was extended again on March 6, 1970. The NYCTA was seeking ways to increase ridership on the route. There were only 8 or 9 riders on each bus. Service ran between 7 and 9 a.m. and between 4 and 7 p.m.
Q86 (first use)	Rosedale LIRR Station	Rosedale; 257th Street and 148th Avenue	Francis Lewis Boulevard	Service began in 1951. Ran from the Rosedale Long Island Railroad Station to 257th Street and 148th Avenue.; On November 29, 1956, the NYCTA approved a large slate of cuts in bus service citywide to take effect January 22, 1957. Initially, this route was planned to be discontinued as part of the changes. However, due to requests by the Queens Borough President and civic groups, the cut was averted. Instead, free transfers were made available at the terminal in Laurelton. Sunday service was discontinued on February 3, 1957, but was restored on August 4. On August 24, 1957, the NYCTA announced that this service would be discontinued on September 8 if ridership did not increase. The NYCTA had lost $30 each Sunday the service was operated.; Originally Q5S; renumbered Q86 on December 11, 1988.; Discontinued in 1996 due to poor ridership.
Q89 (first use)	Elmhurst; Queens Boulevard and Broadway	Jackson Heights	Broadway, Baxter Avenue, 81st Street, 82nd Street	Fifth Avenue Coach Company began operating the 16 on July 9, 1925.; Operated as the "Elmhurst Crosstown Line", a shuttle to connect with the now-Q32 to/from Manhattan.; Taken over by Manhattan and Bronx Surface Transit Operating Authority on March 22, 1962.; Renumbered to Q89 from the 6 on July 1, 1974.; Discontinued on June 26, 1988.
Q89 (second use)	South Ozone Park	Jamaica; 165th Street Terminal	Lincoln Street, Linden Boulevard, Merrick Boulevard	Formerly operated by Green Bus Lines as Q9A.; Extended to 168th Street Bus Terminal on October 30, 1989.; The new route was proposed in March 1986 to serve the newly opened South Jamaica Multi-Service Center. Service was initially planned to operate from Mondays through Saturdays from 8 a.m. to 6 p.m.. The New York City Board of Estimate was scheduled to vote on the proposed route in April 1986. Service was to be operated between 132nd Place and Rockaway Boulevard to 168th Street and Archer Avenue, running via Rockaway Boulevard, Lincoln Street, Linden Boulevard, Merrick Boulevard and Archer Avenue.; Service on the route was scheduled to begin around May 1, 1986, as soon as signs designated the route's stops were installed along the route by the Department of Traffic. Service on the route started after an agreement was reached between Green Bus Lines, the city's Bureau of Franchises and Community Board 12. The Board had sought the creation of the new bus route to help riders traveling between St. Albans or Cambria Heights and South Ozone Park. The Q9A began service operating on weekdays only between 8:30 a.m. and 5 p.m.. Unlike the initial proposal, service began at Lincoln Street and Rockaway Boulevard. In both plans, service made no stops between the turn onto Merrick Boulevard and the terminal.; Under MTA, became the Q89 on April 7, 2008.; Discontinued on June 27, 2010, due to a budget crisis.; Operated one trip per hour in each direction between 10 am and 5 pm weekdays; only bus route in New York City to not serve any subway or rail stations along its route.
Q98V	Jamaica; Liberty Avenue at Union Hall	Edgemere; Beach Channel Drive and Beach 41st Street at Beach 44th Street ( train)	Liberty Avenue, Van Wyck Expressway, Rockaway Boulevard, Cross Bay Boulevard, Rockaway Beach Boulevard, Beach Channel Drive	Began service on March 1, 2021, to bring people from South Ozone Park and the Rockaways to the COVID-19 vaccination center at York College.; Operated only from 6:30 AM to 9 PM, every 30 minutes.; Discontinued on April 25, 2021, due to low ridership.
Q99	Jamaica Center–Parsons/Archer subway station, Jamaica	169th Street subway station, Jamaica		Service began on March 12, 1989, in response to an out-of-court settlement brought by the Jamaica Chamber of Commerce.; Due to low ridership, it was discontinued on September 9, 1990.
Q100 (first use)	Long Island City; Borden Avenue and Jackson Avenue	Woodside; 51st Street and Northern Boulevard	Jackson Avenue, Northern Boulevard	Operated by Steinway Omnibus from September 29, 1939 (renamed Steinway Transit in 1959) until it was discontinued circa 1988; daily franchise run during most of its operation.; The existing Q66 and B62 routes cover most of this route.
Q101R	Became the Q100 on April 6, 2008.			
QBx1	Split into the Q50 and the Bx23 in September 2010.			
