= Lists of NJ Transit bus routes =

The list of New Jersey Transit bus routes has been split into 11 parts:

- Routes 1 through 99
- Routes 100 through 199
- Routes 300 through 399
- Routes 400 through 449
- Routes 450 through 499
- Routes 500 through 549
- Routes 550 through 599
- Routes 600 through 699
- Routes 700 through 799
- Routes 800 through 880
- Routes above 881 (Wheels routes)
