= Dollar vans in the New York metropolitan area =

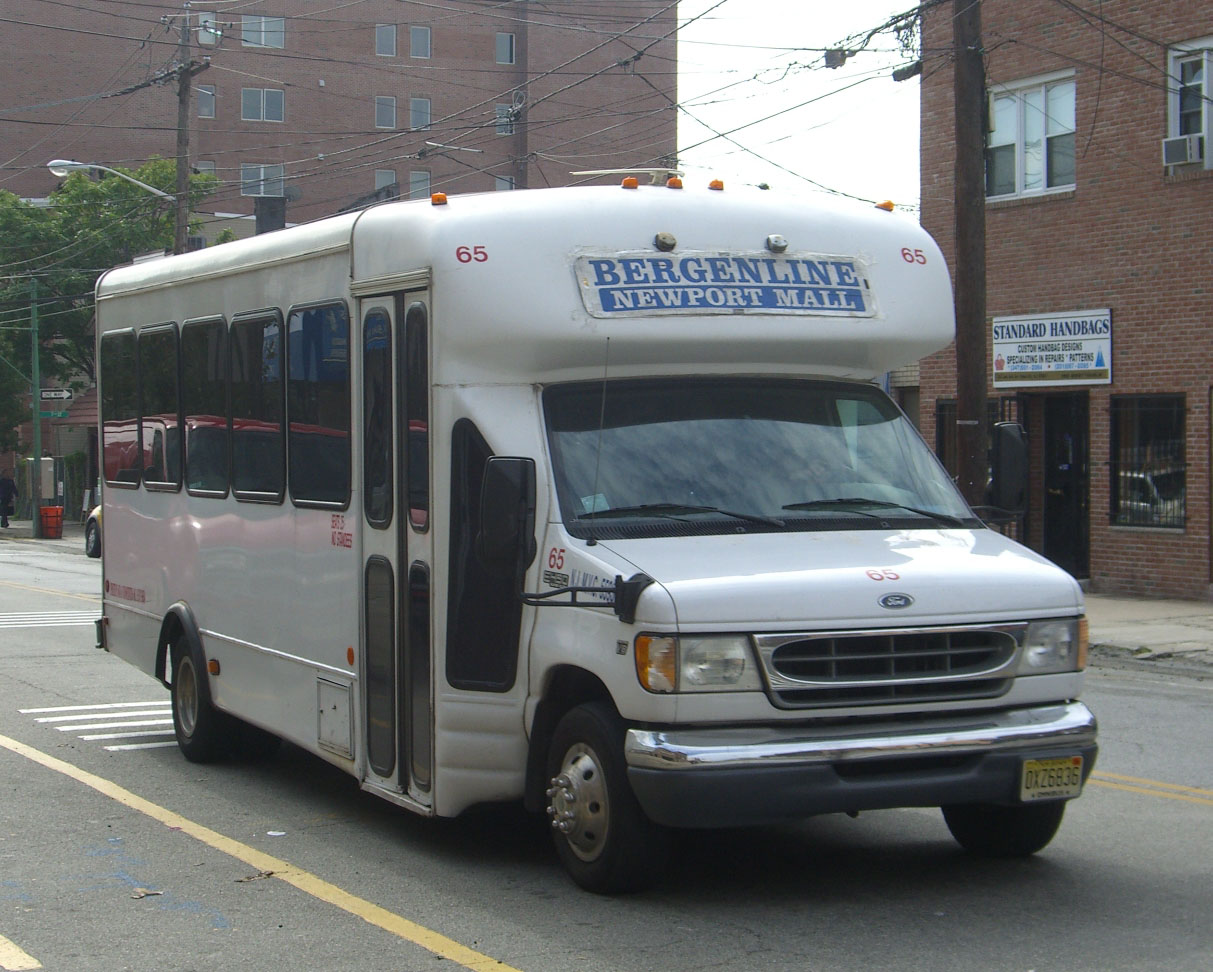
A dollar van in Union City, New Jersey

In the New York metropolitan area, dollar vans are a form of semi-formal public transportation. Dollar vans serve major corridors in Brooklyn, Queens, and the Bronx that lack adequate subway and bus service. A variant of the dollar van, the jitney, also serves areas in eastern New Jersey and transports them to Manhattan.

Within the New York City area, the term "dollar van" originates from the vans which charged one dollar during the 1980 New York City transit strike. Drivers capitalized on the lack of transportation available and subsequently needed throughout the city. Today, dollar vans can still be seen across multiple boroughs. However, prices now typically range from two to six dollars per fare. Often, dollar vans serve what are known as transit deserts, areas that are made up of poor modes of travel and often have many gaps in their transit systems. These "transit deserts" result from a lack of service from MTA Regional Bus Operations routes, or the removal of such service.

Traditionally, the operation of dollar vans has been by immigrants who bring their own culture stateside. Usually Caribbean and Haitian immigrants operate in eastern Queens and Brooklyn, while Chinese immigrants operate within New York City's Chinatowns. Often, drivers modify their vans to add additional amenities, usually inspired from one's culture. The dollar vans have numerous benefits in that they can transport passengers efficiently, and provide a sense of community to the ethnic groups that use them. However, dollar vans also provide competition to licensed drivers, which cannot pick up passengers at MTA bus stops, and are generally more flexible in operations. While permits are available via application through New York City's government, intense licensing requirements and an especially high cost of insurance results in many drivers staying unlicensed and unregulated.

== Operations ==
Dollar vans started operating after the 1980 New York City transit strike, when all transit operated by New York City Transit Authority was stopped. Residents of transit-deprived parts of New York City started a share taxi service with minibuses and their own private vehicles. The fare on each of these share taxis was one dollar. Even after the strike ended, share taxis continued to operate, evolving into higher-capacity "dollar vans" with seats for up to 13 people. During the 2005 New York City transit strike, dollar vans were also used.

Dollar vans and other jitneys mainly serve low-income, immigrant communities in transit deserts, which lack sufficient bus and subway service. Although dollar vans are often dependably punctual and frequent, they often do not have any websites, brochures, stops, or customer service booths. Most riders become familiar with dollar vans either by word of mouth or by actually seeing the vans in public. The vans can pick up and drop off anywhere along a route, and payment is made at the end of a trip. During periods when even limited public mass transit is unavailable, such as the January 2005 Green Bus Lines and Command Bus Company strike or the December 2005 transit strike, dollar vans may become the only feasible method of transportation for many commuters. In such situations, city governments may pass legislation to deter price gouging. However, many such vans are low-priced anyway, often cheaper than the subway or bus.

In New Jersey, 6,500 jitney buses are registered, and are required to have an "Omnibus" license plate, which denotes the vehicle's federal registration. They are also required to undergo inspection by the state MVC mobile inspection team on the vehicles' companies' property twice a year, and be subject to surprise inspection. Drivers of jitneys are required to qualify for a Class B or Class C Commercial Drivers License (CDL), depending on whether the vehicle seats up to 15 or 30 passengers. Violations against a driver's CDL must be resolved and result in payment of fines prior to resumption of driving on the driver's part, with retesting required if the driver waits longer than three years to resolve the issues.

The New York City-area dollar van system is highly used, and in 2011, it was rated the 20th most used "bus system" in the United States. The dollar van and jitney system has been praised as "quietly disruptive" as compared to other vehicle for hire services such as Uber. This has allowed the vans to operate without being restricted by the Taxi and Limousine Commission (TLC).

== Areas served ==
Chinese-operated dollar vans (which are distinct from, and not to be confused with, Chinatown bus lines), go from Manhattan's Chinatown to places in Sunset Park, Brooklyn; Elmhurst, Queens; and Flushing, Queens. There is also a service from Flushing to Sunset Park that does not pass through Manhattan. At $2.50, a ride on Chinatown dollar vans is usually cheaper than a subway and busfare. The vans, which are mostly in Chinese, are used mainly by non-English-speaking Chinese immigrants in Queens and Brooklyn, who have moved to the outer boroughs due to high costs of living in Manhattan. The dollar vans, which take about half as long to travel as the subway, allow Chinese communities in New York City to be closely connected. Some Chinese vans may make stops at places pre-arranged by the customer.

In central Brooklyn, there are many dollar vans that are operated mainly by Haitians and other Caribbean immigrants. One account described these vans as "dollar vans with Haitian flags tied to their antennae, Bible scriptures in colorful decals across their windshields, advertisements for local reggae concerts pasted on their side windows, and forests of rainbow-colored air fresheners dangling from their rearview mirrors." Routes run from Flatlands, Kings Plaza, and Midwood to the Crown Heights – Utica Avenue subway station, Fulton Mall, and Barclays Center, with other vans ferrying people from Flatbush Avenue to Utica Avenue. These dollar vans, which serve the West Indian communities of Crown Heights, Flatbush, East Flatbush, and Prospect Lefferts Gardens, usually cost $2 a fare. They pick up passengers at pre-designated stops, which are sometimes at bus stops. They also provide alternatives to bus routes such as the B41 and B46.

In Jamaica, Queens, vans go to southeast Queens and Far Rockaway. Most vans operate from the Jamaica Center – Parsons/Archer subway terminal. In Queens, the van system is more official; there are fewer unlicensed vans and twice as many licensed vans as in Brooklyn, and several dedicated loading spots have been allocated to these vans. The Jamaica Center-based vans provide an alternative mode of transportation to bus routes such as the Q4 to Cambria Heights, the Q113 to Far Rockaway, and the Q5 and Q85 to Green Acres Mall. When the MTA discontinued some bus routes on June 27, 2010, operators of commuter vans were allowed to take over certain discontinued bus routes. Such routes included the Q74 and Q79 in Queens, as well as the B23, B39, and B71 in Brooklyn.

In Edenwald, Bronx, a van takes passengers 1 mile (1.6 km) to the subway at 233rd Street for $2; the fare is halved for school-age kids. Many passengers and van drivers know each other, and most van drivers are Caribbean. For an additional 25 cents, van drivers drop riders off directly at their homes; help older passengers to their doorways; and assist patrons in carrying packages. This dollar van route was founded in 1984 after the Bx16 bus stopped serving Edenwald Avenue.

Denser urban areas of northern New Jersey, such as Hudson, Bergen and Passaic County, are also served by dollar vans, which are commonly known as jitneys or guaguas, and most of which are run by Spanish Transportation and Community Lines, Inc. Nungessers, along the Anderson Avenue-Bergenline Avenue transit corridor, is a major origination/termination point, as are 42nd Street in Manhattan, Newport Mall and Five Corners in Jersey City, and GWB Plaza in Fort Lee. These interstate vans are under the purview of the federal government. Additionally, long-distance commuter vans go out from Upper Manhattan to various areas throughout the Northeastern United States, with the highest service levels provided out to the Poconos, Wyoming Valley and Lehigh Valley regions in Northeastern Pennsylvania (e.g. Stroudsburg, Mount Pocono, Hazleton, Wilkes-Barre, Scranton, Easton, Bethlehem, Allentown, Reading, etc.)

== Criticism ==
Travelers cite safety, comfort, reliability and cost as factors in choosing larger bus service over jitneys. Hudson County commuters who prefer NJ Transit buses, for example, cite senior citizen discounts and air conditioning among their reasons, which has led some jitney operators to display bumper stickers advertising air conditioning aboard their vehicles in order to lure passengers. Some who prefer the buses will nonetheless take the jitneys if they arrive before the buses, as they pass bus stops more frequently than the buses and are cheaper. Others choose buses because, they claim, jitney drivers are less safe, and are prone to using cell phones and playing loud music while driving. Although Union City jitney driver Samuel Martinez has complained that authorities unfairly target them and not the larger buses, North Bergen Patrol Commander Lt. James Somers has contended that jitneys are less safe, and sometimes exhibit higher levels of aggressive driving in order to pick up passengers, which has led to arguments among drivers. Somers also stated that police can only stop a vehicle that appears to have an obvious problem, and that only certified inspectors from the state MVC can stop a vehicle for less apparent, more serious problems.

Dollar vans may change ownership over the course of decades, and the mostly immigrant drivers are subject to police searches. Between 1994 and 2015, the TLC issued 418 van licenses, although the vast majority of vans are unlicensed. Licensed vans cannot pick up at New York City bus stops, and all pick-ups must be predetermined and all passengers logged. Additionally, in the 1980s and 1990s, the predominantly black and mostly immigrant dollar van drivers stated that they were harassed "day and night" by the New York City Police Department (NYPD), with some van drivers having their keys confiscated and thrown away by NYPD officers.

=== Regulation ===
In 2006, the New York City Council began debate on greater industry regulation, including requiring all dollar vans to be painted in a specific color to make them easier to recognize, similar to the public light buses in Hong Kong.

Over the course of the 2000s, surprise inspections in Hudson County have been imposed on jitney operators, whose lack of regulation, licensing or regular scheduling has been cited as the cause for numerous fines. A series of such inspections of the vans on Bergenline Avenue in June 2010 resulted in 285 citation violations, including problems involving brake lights, bald tires, steering wheels, suspensions, exhaust pipes, and emergency doors welded shut. An early July 2010 surprise inspection by the Hudson County Prosecutor's Office, which receives federal funding for regulating jitneys, found 23 out of 33 jitneys to be unsafe, which were taken out of service. Claims have also been made that jitneys cause congestion and undermine licensed bus service. Drivers of these vans have also developed a reputation for ignoring traffic laws in the course of competing for fares, picking up and dropping off passengers at random locations, and driving recklessly.

In 2012, four Chinatown vans were seized for carrying too many passengers over the legal limit of 19. In 2014, over 1,000 dollar vans were seized by TLC and NYPD inspectors for illegal dollar van operations. However, most vans were returned to their owners within relatively short periods of time.

On July 30, 2013, an accident occurred at 56th Street and Boulevard East in West New York, New Jersey, in which Angelie Paredes, an 8-month-old North Bergen resident, was killed in her stroller when a full-sized jitney bus belonging to the New York-based Sphinx company toppled a light pole. The driver, Idowu Daramola of Queens, was arrested and charged with a number of offenses, including using a cell phone while driving. Officials also stated that he was speeding; however, this was later disputed by an investigator to the scene who concluded that there was insufficient evidence to determine the speed of the bus. At an August 6 press conference, legislators including U.S. Representative Albio Sires, New Jersey State Senator Nicholas Sacco, State Assembly members Vincent Prieto, Charles Mainor and Angelica Jimenez, West New York Mayor Felix Roque, Weehawken Mayor Richard Turner, Guttenberg Mayor Gerald Drasheff, Freeholder Junior Maldonado and Hudson County Sheriff Frank Schillari, noted that problems with jitneys existed since the 1980s, and called for stricter regulations for drivers and bus companies. This included increased monitoring and enforcement, and heightened participation by the public in identifying poor drivers, as jitneys had been exempt from regulations imposed on buses and other forms of transportation. In February 2014, Governor Chris Christie signed Angelie's Law, which strengthens regulations on commuter buses.

== See also ==
- Aluguer – Share taxi in Cape Verde
- Dolmuş – Share taxi in Turkey and Northern Cyprus
- Hail and ride
- Jeepney – Type of public utility vehicle in the Philippines
- Marshrutka – Share taxis found in Eastern Europe and the republics of the former Soviet Union
- Minibuses in Hong Kong – Minibus used for public transport services in Hong Kong
- Nanny van – School bus service in Hong Kong
- Pesero – Form of public transport in Mexico City
- Share taxi – Mode of transport which falls between both taxicabs and buses
- Songthaew – Type of passenger vehicle
