= Jamaica Center–York College station =

New York City Subway station in Queens

Jamaica Center–York College
- Station entrance signage in October 2026

Station statistics
- Address: Parsons Boulevard and Archer Avenue; Queens, New York
- Borough: Queens
- Locale: Jamaica
- Coordinates: 40.702407°N 73.799973°W
- Division: B (BMT/IND)
- Line: BMT Archer Avenue Line; IND Archer Avenue Line
- Services: E (all times); J (all times); Z (rush hours, peak direction)
- Transit: See Jamaica Center Bus Terminal
- Structure: Underground
- Levels: 2
- Platforms: 2 island platforms (1 on each level)
- Tracks: 4 (2 on each level)

Other information
- Opened: December 11, 1988; 37 years ago
- Accessible: Yes
- Former/other names: Jamaica Center–Parsons Boulevard; Jamaica Center–Parsons/Archer

Traffic
- 2025: 6,573,513 ▲7.6%
- Rank: 36 out of 423
Services
Preceding station	New York City Subway	Following station
Sutphin Boulevard–Archer Avenue–JFK Airport E J Z services split	E (New York City Subway service) J/Z (New York City Subway service)	Terminus
Location
Location within New York City Subway
Location within New York City
Location within New York
Track layout
Upper level
Lower level
Street map
Station service legend
Symbol	Description
Stops all times	Stops all times
Stops rush hours in the peak direction only	Stops rush hours in the peak direction only

The Jamaica Center–York College station (formerly the Jamaica Center–Parsons Boulevard station and Jamaica Center-Parsons/Archer station and sometimes shortened as the Jamaica Center station) is the northern terminal station of the IND and BMT Archer Avenue Lines of the New York City Subway, located at Parsons Boulevard and Archer Avenue in Jamaica, Queens. It is served by E and J trains at all times, as well as Z trains during rush hours in the peak direction.

This station opened on December 11, 1988, as Jamaica Center–Parsons Boulevard. The station is a major transfer point for buses from eastern Queens, and replaces the old 160th Street and 168th Street stations of the BMT Jamaica Line; the Jamaica Center station is located near the site of the former. It is also near the site of the Long Island Rail Road's now-demolished Union Hall Street station. The station is announced as Jamaica Center on E trains.

== History ==
=== Construction and opening ===
The plans for the Archer Avenue Lines emerged in the 1960s under the city and the Metropolitan Transportation Authority (MTA)'s Program for Action. The Archer Avenue subway's groundbreaking took place on August 15, 1972, at Archer Avenue and 151st Street, and the station's design started on December 7, 1973. By July 1974, when the federal government announced its approval of a $51.1 million (equivalent to $333,598,178 in 2025) grant for the project, the Parsons Boulevard station was expected to be used by 8,700 passengers during rush hours. Construction of two 200-foot (61 m) tunnels under the nine tracks of the LIRR Main Line in Jamaica began in January 1976. This section, connecting to the Archer Avenue Line's upper-level platform. started at Archer Avenue near 159th Street and ending about 150 feet (46 m) south of South Road near the Atlantic Branch, passing underneath the center of the York College campus. The two tunnels were completed in May 1976; south of these tunnel segments, the line would have been extended south several hundred yards, but this extension was never built.

On September 26, 1980, $40 million of federal funding was transferred to the MTA to build the connection to the Jamaica Line, to complete the Parsons Boulevard station, and the installation of track along the line, including the section south of that station to South Road and 158th Street. Work continued on the connection to the Queens Boulevard Line. The project's opening date at this juncture was October 1984. Plans for the station were completed in-house on June 17, 1981. Bids on the station construction were received on September 21, 1981, and was awarded to A. J. Pegno Construction Corporation for $22,425,415 (equivalent to $79,416,504 in 2025). Work on the station commenced on October 12, 1981.

Because of the 1975 New York City fiscal crisis, the Archer Avenue Line was never fully built to Springfield Boulevard, and was instead truncated to Parsons Boulevard. The shortened version of the line contained three stations and was 2 miles (3.2 km) long. In October 1980, the MTA considered stopping work on the line and on the 63rd Street Line, due to its budget crisis and the bad state of the existing subway system. Due to lack of money, all bidding on new subway and bus projects for the MTA was suspended in 1981, except for the already-built portions of the 63rd Street and Archer Avenue lines, which were allowed to continue. In September 1983, the project was 80 percent complete, and was expected to be in operation in fall 1985. Construction was completed a year ahead of schedule, in 1983, but was delayed for several more years due to various disputes. The station opened along with the rest of the Archer Avenue Line on December 11, 1988.

=== Post-opening ===
On December 14, 1991, a display titled "Astoria–Dreams of New York," a 32 feet (9.8 m)-long mural, consisting of seven portraits of first-generation Greek immigrants was removed from the station for not including any pictures of African Americans, seven days after going up. The artist, Eugenia Marketou, called the decision "censorship of the worst kind." The piece was removed at the request of the directors of the Arts for Transit program after a negative public reaction, which included their defacement with graffiti and protest stickers. A dozen African American riders had complained to the agency. On the same date, a $70,000 sculpture called "Jamaica Center Stations Riders, Blue," which was created by well-known African American artist Sam Gilliam, was unveiled at the station. The sculpture was funded through the MTA Arts for Transit program, which allocates 1 percent of capital construction costs for art projects. After negotiations between Marketou and his agency took place, it was reinstalled on February 6, 1992, with a banner stating "Portraits of the Greek Immigrant Community" added in addition to the tile. In addition, Marketou agreed to appear in front of it during three rush hours to explain it. One of the photographs was removed in the following two weeks. The exhibit was only scheduled to stay until May 6, 1992.

In 2004, the station was renamed to Jamaica Center-Parsons/Archer station.

To save energy, the MTA installed variable-speed escalators at Jamaica Center–Parsons/Archer and three other subway stations in August 2008, although not all of the escalators initially functioned as intended.

In 2020, the MTA announced that it would reconstruct the track and third rail on the IND Archer Avenue Line, which had become deteriorated. From September 19 to November 2, 2020, E service was cut back to Jamaica–Van Wyck, with a shuttle bus connecting to Sutphin Boulevard and Jamaica Center. The MTA then announced it would reconstruct the track on the BMT Archer Avenue Line. Starting on July 1, 2022, J service was cut back to 121st Street, and Z service was temporarily discontinued, with a shuttle bus connecting to Sutphin Boulevard and Jamaica Center. The work was completed in September 2022. The lower-level platform underwent structural and esthetic renovations in mid-2023. In October 2026, the station was renamed to Jamaica Center–York College, to celebrate the 60th anniversary of York College.

== Station layout ==
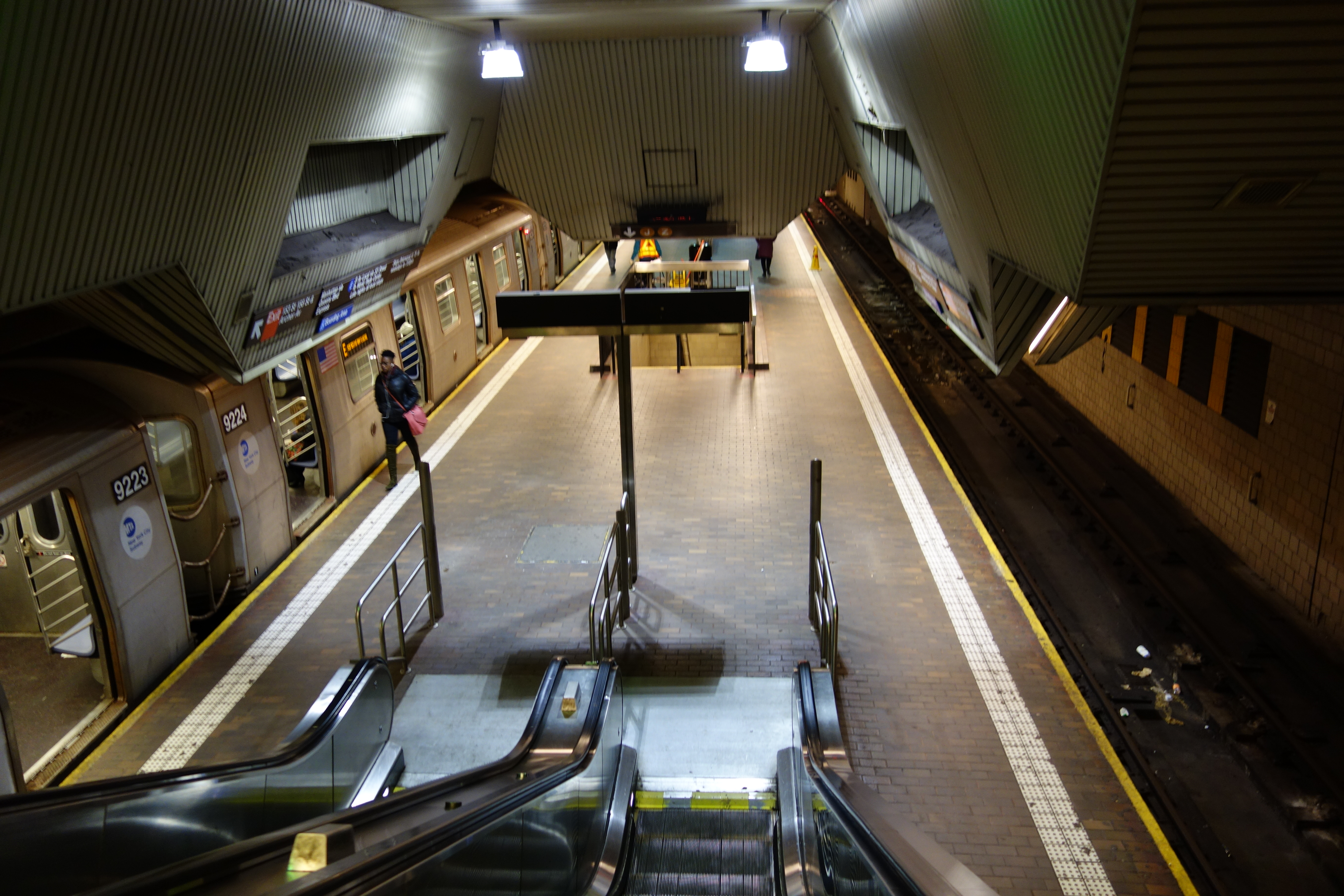
A view of the upper level

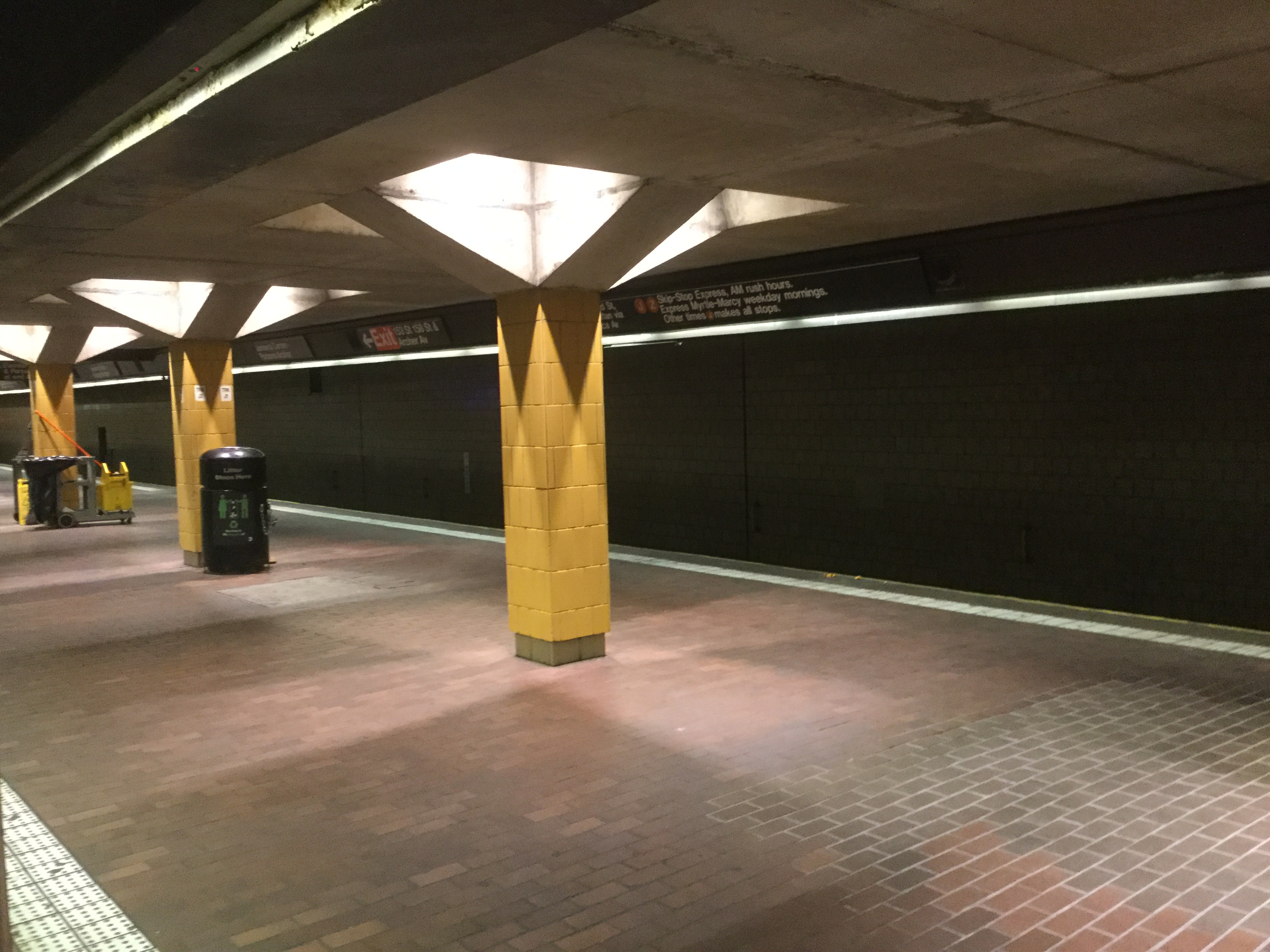
A view of the lower level

The Jamaica Center–York College station has two levels, each with two tracks and an island platform. The E train serves the upper level (IND) at all times. The J and Z trains serve the lower level (BMT); the former operates all times and the latter operates during rush hours in the peak direction. The station is the eastern terminus of all service; the next stop to the west is Sutphin Boulevard–Archer Avenue–JFK Airport. Like the other stations on the Archer Avenue Line, Jamaica Center–York College station is fully ADA-accessible. Both platforms are 600 feet (183 m) in length, standard for a full-length B Division train; however, since BMT Eastern Division trains are only 480 feet (146 m) long, there are fences at both of the unused ends of the lower-level platforms to prevent passengers from falling onto the tracks. Fixed platform barriers, which are intended to prevent commuters falling to the tracks, are positioned near the platform edges throughout the lengths of both platforms.

As with other stations constructed as part of the Program for Action, the Jamaica Center–York College station contained technologically advanced features such as air-cooling, noise insulation, CCTV monitors, public announcement systems, electronic platform signage, and escalator and elevator entrances. This station has ten escalators and two elevators.

This station has tan brick walls and red brick floor on both levels. The coved trapezoidal ceilings are suspended and have metal slats.

=== Exits ===
There are two entrances to this station. The first one is at the very east end of the station and connects with Parsons Boulevard. It contains a mezzanine that has four escalators, two to each platform, and an ADA-accessible elevator serving both platforms. There is a large, single bank of turnstiles with nine turnstiles leading to fare control. One wide staircase and one escalator leads to a pavilion behind the streets at the northeast corner of Parsons Boulevard and Archer Avenue. A narrower staircase and escalator leads to the southeast corner. An elevator is present near the southeast corner of the intersection. This entrance contains a 1991 artwork called Jamaica Center Station Riders by Sam Gilliam made up of blue painted aluminum.

The second exit is near the middle of the platforms and connects with 153rd Street. Each platform contains two escalators to the mezzanine; the upper level also has one staircase to the mezzanine, while the lower level has two. In this mezzanine, there are five regular turnstiles, five High Entry-Exit Turnstiles, and two high exit-only turnstiles. This entrance has three street stairs; two of them, one of which also has an up-only escalator, lead up to the south side of Archer Avenue outside the bus boarding area. The staircase with the escalator has a brickwork design surrounding it while the other staircase at this entrance has an ultra-wide green metal fence. There is another staircase at the northeast corner of Archer Avenue and 153rd Street.

=== Infrastructure ===
West of the station, both levels feature diamond crossovers, which are halfway between this station and Sutphin Boulevard–Archer Avenue.

The tracks on both levels extend past the station for possible future extensions, but are currently used for storage. On the lower level, they continue one train length of about 480 feet (150 m) and end at bumper blocks at 160th Street; they were originally planned to extend as far as Merrick Boulevard. This was a planned extension toward 190th Street–Hollis Avenue (near the Hollis LIRR station). Where the lower level tracks end, there is a provision for a diamond crossover switch at the end of the tunnel (under 160th Street). On the upper level, the tracks extend around 2,000 feet (610 m) or just over 3 train lengths of about 600 feet (180 m), curving south under the LIRR Atlantic Branch 60 feet (18 m) below ground. They then run under 160th Street within the York College campus and end at bumper blocks near Tuskegee Airmen Way (formerly South Road). This was the site of the line's original groundbreaking in 1973. The plan was for this line to use the LIRR Locust Manor Branch (Atlantic) ROW and run to Springfield Boulevard or Rosedale LIRR station. Where the upper level tracks stub end, there is a provision for a portal to go outside if the line going to Southeastern Queens is ever built. The tunnel was originally planned to curve west towards the Atlantic ROW just north of Liberty Avenue, running underneath the York College Athletic Field.

East of the upper-level platform, a Central Instrument Room (753CIR) is located deep in the tunnel on track D2A (upper level) bench wall.

East of the station, next to the D1A tail track on the upper level, the tunnel catwalk structure widens, and the track curves south along with the D2A track. Where the catwalk structure ends, there is a stairway to the lower level tail tracks.

== Ridership ==
In 2018, the station had 10,681,269 boardings, making it the 27th most used station in the 423-station system. This amounted to an average of 36,368 passengers per weekday.

== Gallery ==
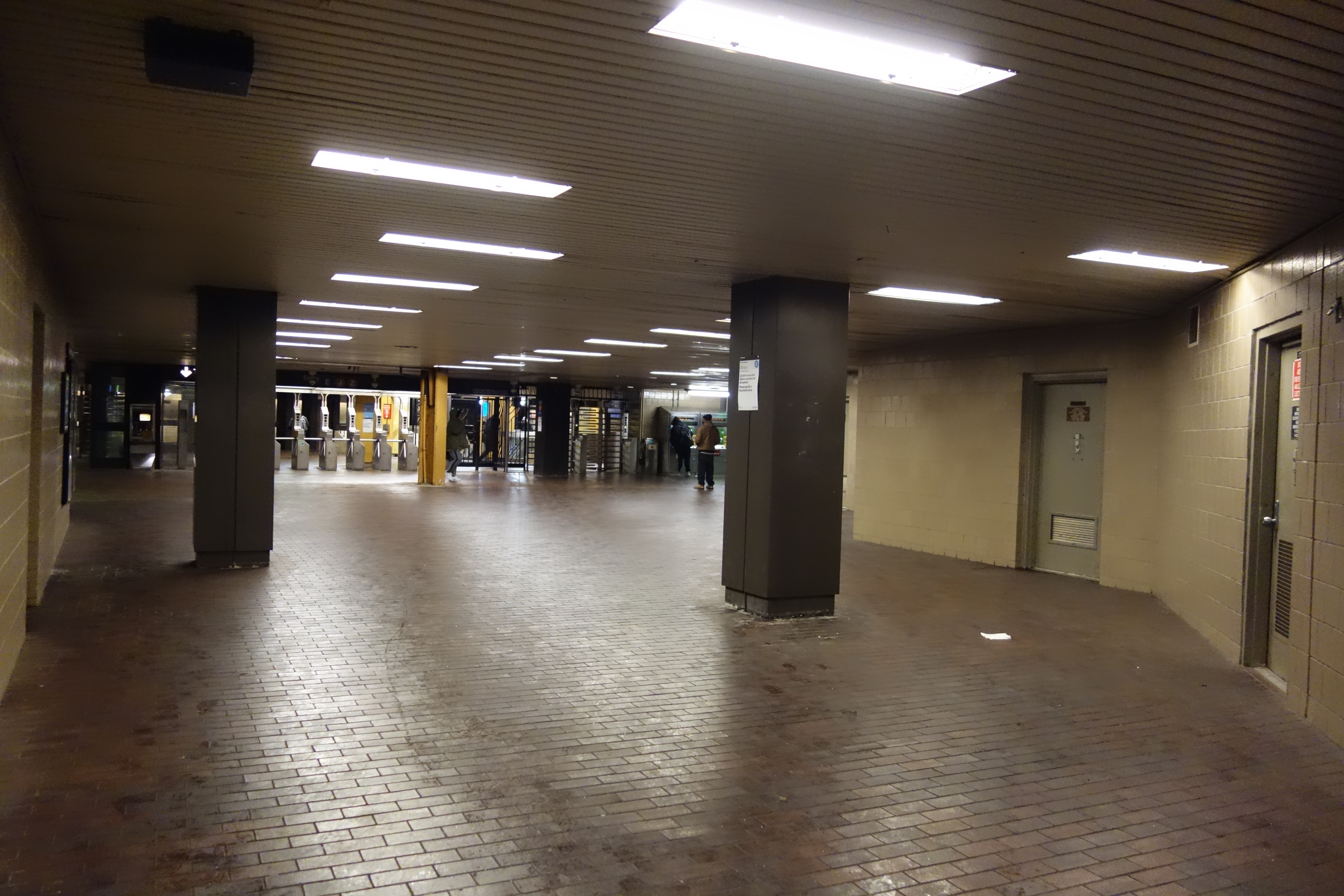
The western mezzanine

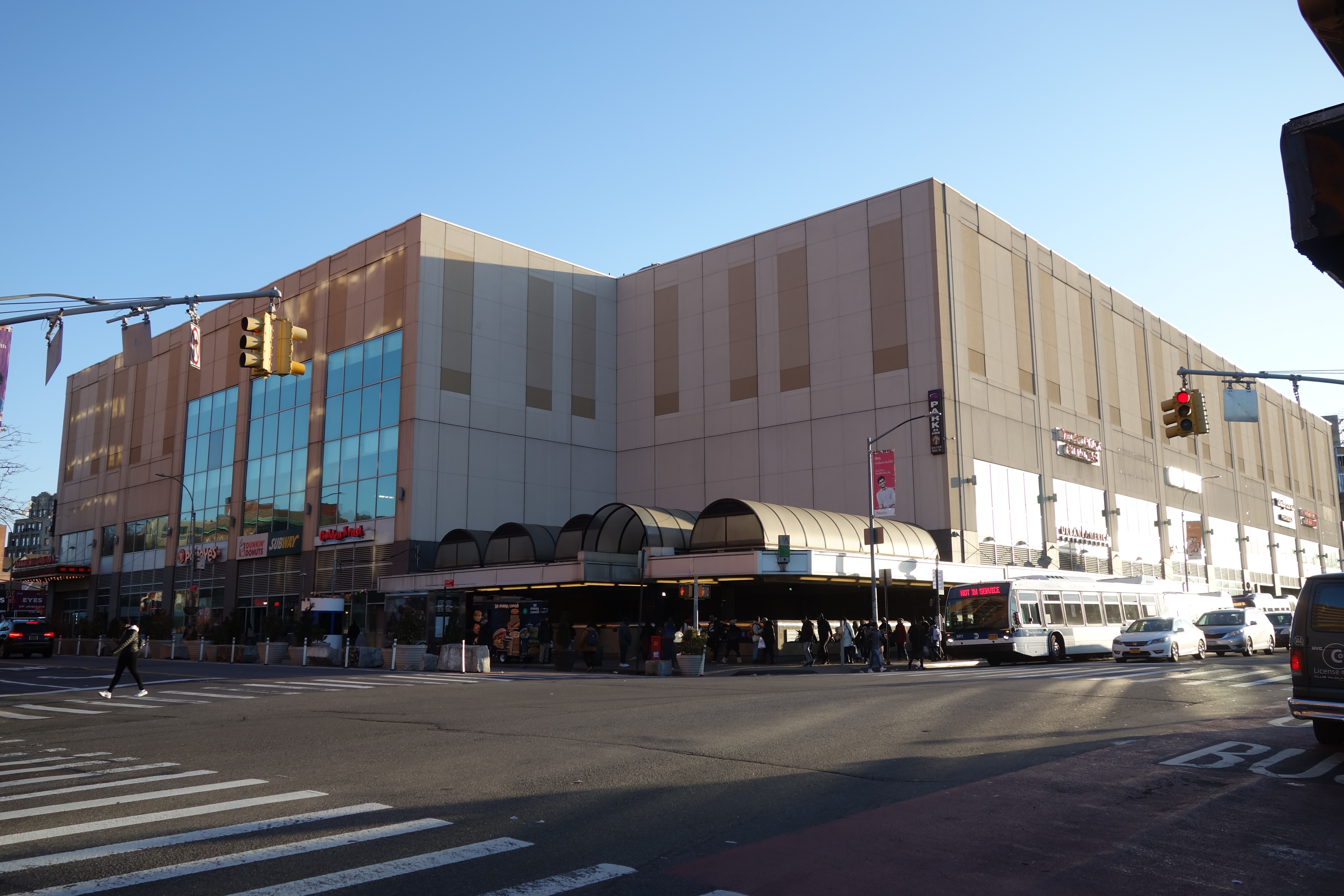
The main entrance, located at the northeast corner of Archer Avenue and Parsons Boulevard

== Jamaica Center Bus Terminal ==
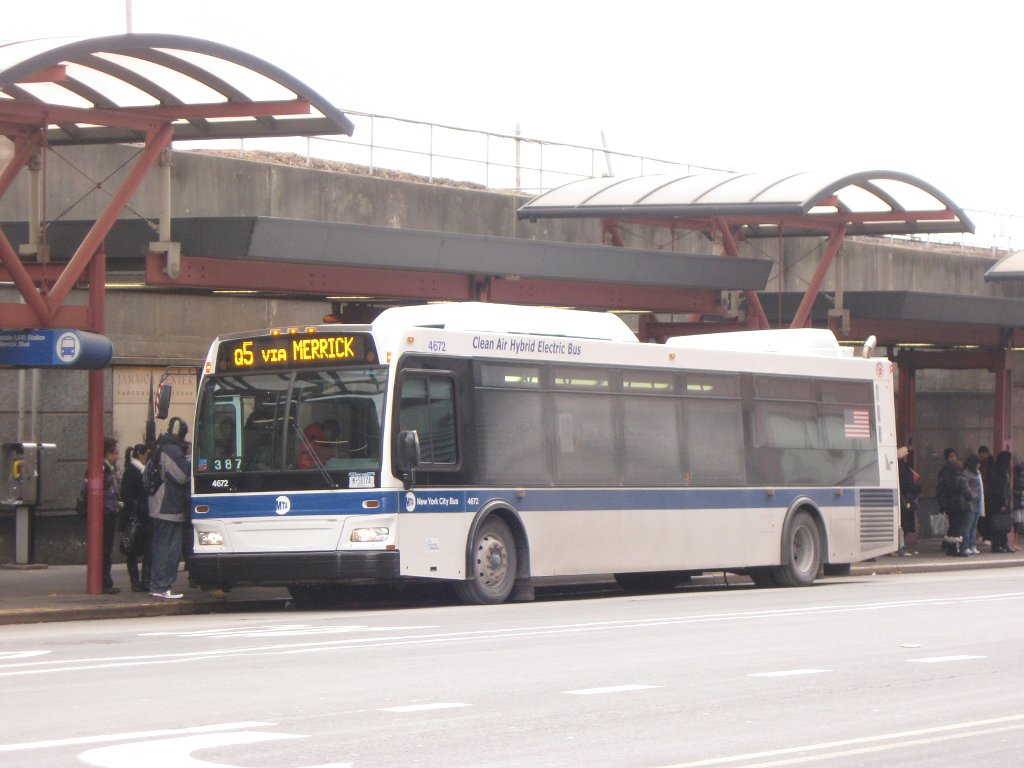
The Jamaica Center Bus Terminal can be found at some of the exits.

The subway complex includes the Jamaica Center Bus Terminal, a series of bus stops located along Archer Avenue (primarily along the south side of the street next to the LIRR right of way). The bus stop areas are lettered A through H. The western portion of the terminal (bays F through H and the bus layover area) is also known as the "Teardrop Canopy". It serves as a major transit hub within Jamaica. The former 160th Street Jamaica Elevated station on Jamaica Avenue that it replaced was also a major hub for trolley service when it was originally built. Several of the trolley lines were the predecessors to current bus service.

Jamaica Center is also a hub for dollar vans in the New York metropolitan area.

Route	Jamaica terminal (if not the Jamaica Center Bus Terminal)	Other terminal	via	Notes
MTA Bus
Q6	168th Street Bus Terminal	JFK International Airport	Jamaica Avenue, Sutphin Boulevard, Rockaway Boulevard, North Boundary Road	
Q8	168th Street Bus Terminal	Spring Creek	Jamaica Avenue, 101st Avenue, Fountain Avenue	
Q9	168th Street Bus Terminal	South Ozone Park	Jamaica Avenue, Supthin Boulevard, Liberty Avenue, 135th Street (Northbound), Van Wyck Expressway Service Road (Southbound), Lincoln Street	
Q25	Sutphin Boulevard–Archer Avenue – JFK Airport Subway station	College Point	Parsons Boulevard, Kissena Boulevard, 127th Street	
Q41	168th Street Bus Terminal	Howard Beach	Lakewood Avenue, 109th Avenue, Cross Bay Boulevard	
Q65	Sutphin Boulevard–Archer Avenue – JFK Airport Subway station	Flushing–Main Street Subway Station	164th Street, 45th Avenue	Originally the NY&QC Flushing-Jamaica and College Point trolley lines
Q110	88th Avenue and Parsons Boulevard	Floral Park, New York	Jamaica Avenue	
Q111	Parsons Boulevard Subway station	Rosedale or Cedarhurst	All trips: Guy R. Brewer Boulevard, 147th Avenue, Cedarhurst trips: Rosedale Road, Peninsula Boulevard	Originally Queens portion of the LIER Far Rockaway Line
Q112	88th Avenue and Parsons Boulevard	Euclid Avenue Subway station	South Road, Liberty Avenue	
Q113	Parsons Boulevard Subway station	Far Rockaway	Guy R. Brewer Boulevard, Rockaway Boulevard, Nassau Expressway	Originally the LIER Far Rockaway Line; Evenings and overnights, no Q113 service operates at this time. Use the Q114 or Q115.
Q114	Parsons Boulevard Subway station	Far Rockaway	Guy R. Brewer Boulevard, 147th Avenue, Rockaway Turnpike	Originally the LIER Far Rockaway Line; Evenings and overnights, no Q113 service operates at this time. Use the Q114 or Q115.
Q115	Parsons Boulevard Subway station	Laurelton	Guy R. Brewer Boulevard	
NYCT Bus
Q4	to Cambria Heights		Merrick Boulevard, Linden Boulevard	
Q5	to Laurelton; Rosedale LIRR station; or Green Acres Mall, Valley Stream		Merrick Boulevard, Hook Creek Boulevard, Sunrise Highway	Green Acres Mall on weekends only, Rosedale on weekend nights only
Q20	Merrick Boulevard and Archer Avenue	College Point	Archer Avenue, Main Street, Union Street, 20th Avenue	
Q24	88th Avenue and Parsons Boulevard	Bushwick	Jamaica/Archer Avenues, Atlantic Avenue, Broadway (Brooklyn)	
Q30	Sutphin Boulevard–Archer Avenue – JFK Airport Subway station	Little Neck	Homelawn Street, Utopia Parkway, Horace Harding Expressway	
Q31	Sutphin Boulevard–Archer Avenue – JFK Airport Subway station	Bay Terrace	Jamaica/Archer Avenues, Homelawn Street, Utopia Parkway, 47th/48th Avenues, Bell Boulevard	
Q42	to Addisleigh Park		Liberty Avenue, 174th Street, Sayres Avenue	
Q44 SBS	Merrick Boulevard and Archer Avenue	West Farms	Archer Avenue, Main Street, Union Street, Parsons Boulevard, Whitestone Expressway, Cross Bronx Expressway	Travels via the Whitestone Bridge between Queens and the Bronx
Q54	170th Street & Jamaica Avenue	Williamsburg Bridge Plaza Bus Terminal	Jamaica Avenue, Metropolitan Avenue, Grand Street	Successors to BMT streetcar service
Q56	170th Street & Jamaica Avenue	Broadway Junction Subway station	Jamaica Avenue	Successors to BMT streetcar service
Q75	Sutphin Boulevard–Archer Avenue – JFK Airport Subway station	Queensborough Community College	Homelawn Street, Utopia Parkway, Horace Harding Expressway, Springfield Boulevard	Weekday only route
Q83	Parsons Boulevard Subway station	Cambria Heights	Liberty Avenue, Murdock Avenue	
Q84	to Laurelton		Merrick Boulevard, 120th Avenue	
Q85	to Rosedale		Merrick Boulevard, Bedell Street, Conduit Avenue, 243rd Street	Part of the former NY&LIT Brooklyn-Freeport Line
Q86	to Rosedale		Merrick Boulevard, Brookville Boulevard, 243rd Street	
Q87	to Green Acres Mall, Valley Stream		Merrick Boulevard, Hook Creek Boulevard, Sunrise Highway	
Q89	to Green Acres Mall, Valley Stream		Merrick Boulevard, Bedell Street, Conduit Avenue, Sunrise Highway	Part of the former NY&LIT Brooklyn-Freeport Line
NICE Bus
n4	to Freeport		Merrick Road, Merrick Boulevard	Part of the former NY&LIT Brooklyn-Freeport Line
n4X	to Freeport		Merrick Road, Merrick Boulevard	Express to Freeport Station Weekdays Only

== Nearby points of interest ==
- King Manor
- York College
- Jamaica Center for Arts & Learning
