= Merrick Boulevard buses =

Bus routes in Queens, New York

q5 q85 rush, q86 rush, q87 rush, q89 rush
- Merrick Boulevard; Jamaica−Rosedale
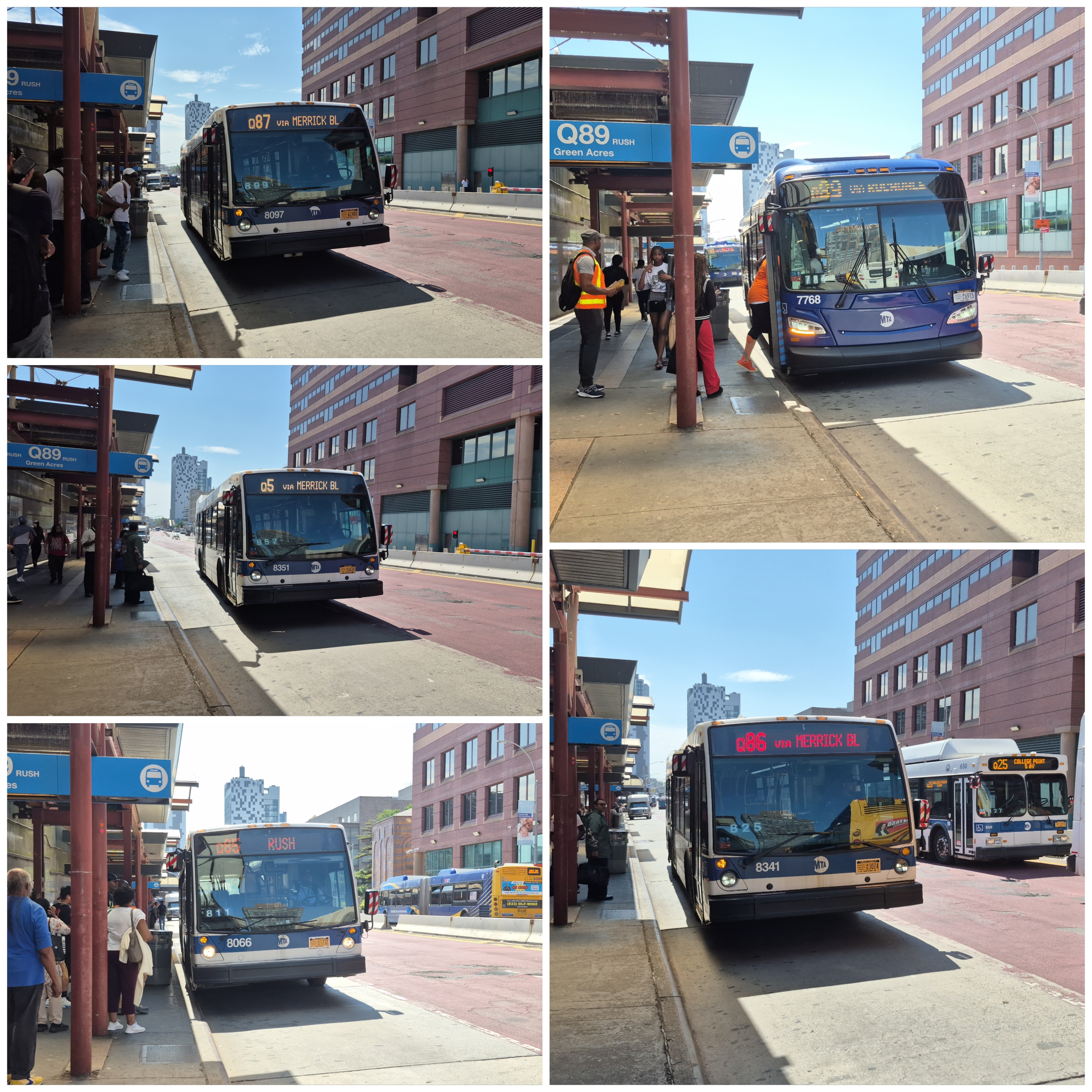
- 2011 LFS #8066 on the Q85, 2015 LFS #8097 on the Q87, 2016 LFSs #8341 on the Q86 and #8351 on the Q5, and 2019 XD40 #7768 on the Q89 at Jamaica Center, boarding passengers on June 30, 2025.

Overview
- System: MTA Regional Bus Operations
- Operator: New York City Transit Authority
- Garage: Jamaica Depot
- Vehicle: Nova Bus LFS; New Flyer Xcelsior XD40

Route
- Locale: Queens, New York, U.S.
- Communities served: Jamaica, South Jamaica, St. Albans, Locust Manor, Laurelton, Springfield Gardens, Rosedale, Valley Stream
- Start: Jamaica Center – Parsons/Archer
- Via: Merrick Boulevard
- End: Q5 weekday: Laurelton – Merrick Boulevard and 233rd Street; Q85: Rosedale – 243rd Street and 147th Avenue; Q86: Rosedale – 253rd Street and 149th Avenue; Q5 weekend, Q87, Q89: South Valley Stream, Nassau County – Green Acres Mall
- Length: Q5 (Jamaica to Laurelton or Rosedale): 4.4 miles (7.1 km) / 5.6 miles (9.0 km); Q86 (Jamaica to Rosedale): 6.9 miles (11.1 km); Q87 (Jamaica to Green Acres): 6.8 miles (10.9 km); Q85 (Jamaica to Rosedale): 6.2 miles (10.0 km); Q89 (Jamaica to Green Acres): 7.4 miles (11.9 km)
- Other routes: Q4 (Merrick Boulevard−Linden Boulevard); Q84 (Merrick Boulevard−120th Avenue) n4 (Jamaica−Freeport) n4X (Jamaica−Freeport Express)

Service
- Operates: 24 hours (Q5, Q85); All times except weekend late nights (Q86); All times except late nights (Q87, Q89)
- Annual patronage: Q5: 1,817,735 (2025); Q85: 1,620,285 (2025); Q86: 331,351 (2025); Q87: 372,545 (2025); Q89: 310,325 (2025)
- Transfers: Yes
- Timetable: Q5 Q85/Q89 Q86/Q87

The Q5, Q85, Q86, Q87, and Q89 bus routes constitute a public transit corridor running along Merrick Boulevard in Southeastern Queens, New York City, United States. The routes run from the Jamaica Center transit hub and business district to Rosedale, with continued service to the Green Acres Mall shopping center in Nassau County. The Q4 and Q84 buses also serve the northern portion of the corridor, before diverging east along Linden Boulevard and 120th Avenue respectively.

The Q4, Q5, Q84, and Q85 routes were operated by Bee-Line Inc. and later the North Shore Bus Company until 1947. The four routes were later taken over by MTA Regional Bus Operations under the New York City Transit brand. On June 29, 2025, all weekday Q5 service began terminating at 233rd Street, and all weekend daytime service began running to Green Acres, with its Rosedale branch replaced by the Q86. Weekday service to Green Acres is provided by the Q87, and the Q85’s Green Acres branch was spun off into the Q89. All of these routes are operated by MTA Regional Bus Operations.

== Route description and service ==
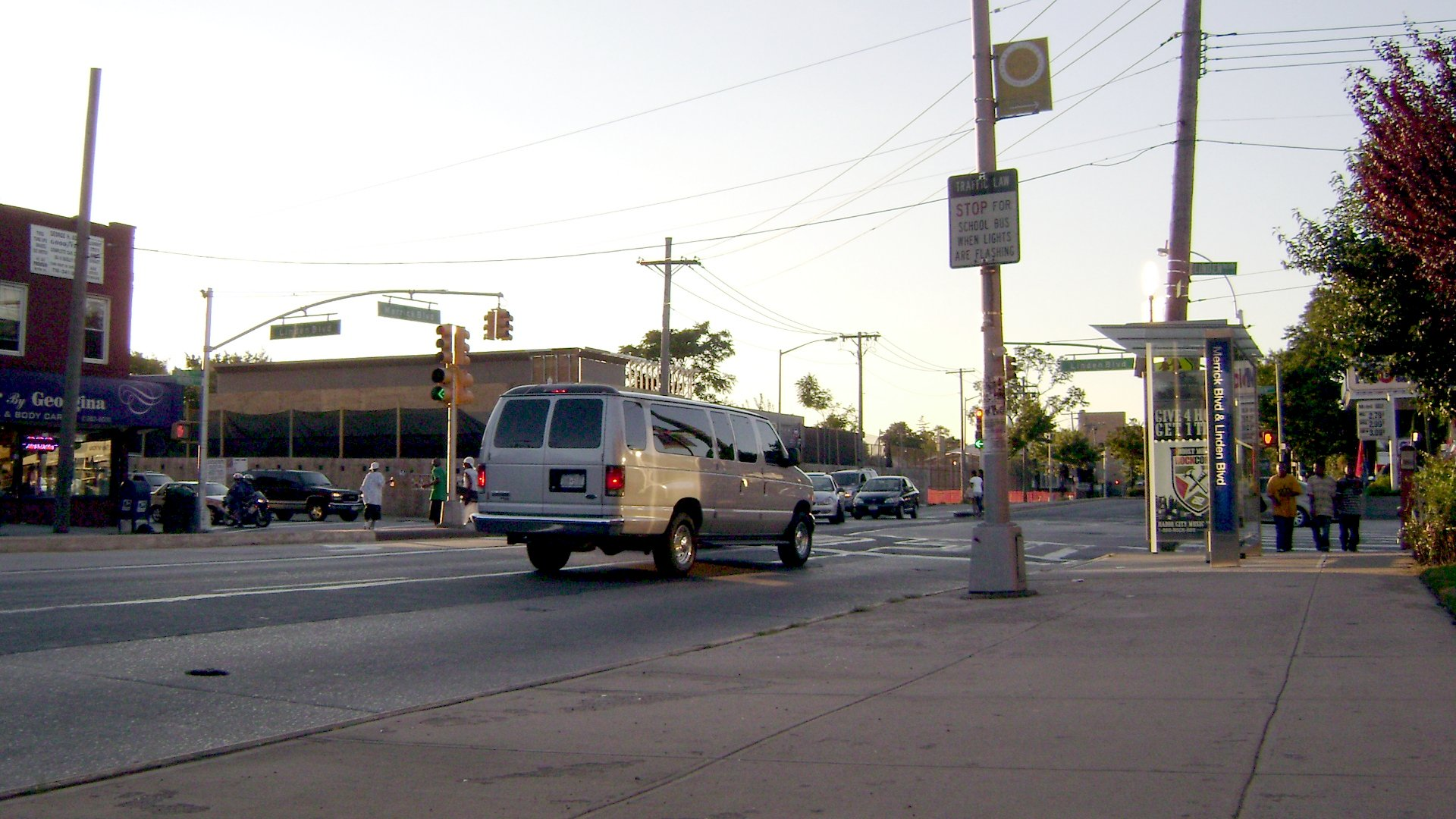
A Q5/Q85 Jamaica bus stop & shelter at Merrick/Linden Boulevards, alongside the Q84

The Q5, Q85, Q86, Q87, and Q89 share most of the Queens portion of Merrick Boulevard (also known as Floyd H. Flake Boulevard (Note: Merrick Boulevard was co-named Floyd H. Flake Boulevard in October 2020, in honor of Floyd Flake, senior pastor of the Greater Allen A. M. E. Cathedral of New York in Jamaica.)), which runs southeast towards the Nassau County border. The routes run from the Jamaica Center–Parsons/Archer bus terminal to either Rosedale near the Nassau County border or Green Acres Mall in Nassau County. The Q5 makes local stops on the corridor, while the Q85, Q86, Q87, and Q89 are rush routes, making limited stops along the corridor and local stops elsewhere. The routes on the corridor mainly serve as feeder routes to New York City Subway services at Jamaica Center–York College station. Buses along the corridor operate out of the Jamaica Bus Depot on Merrick Boulevard near Jamaica Center.

=== Q5 ===
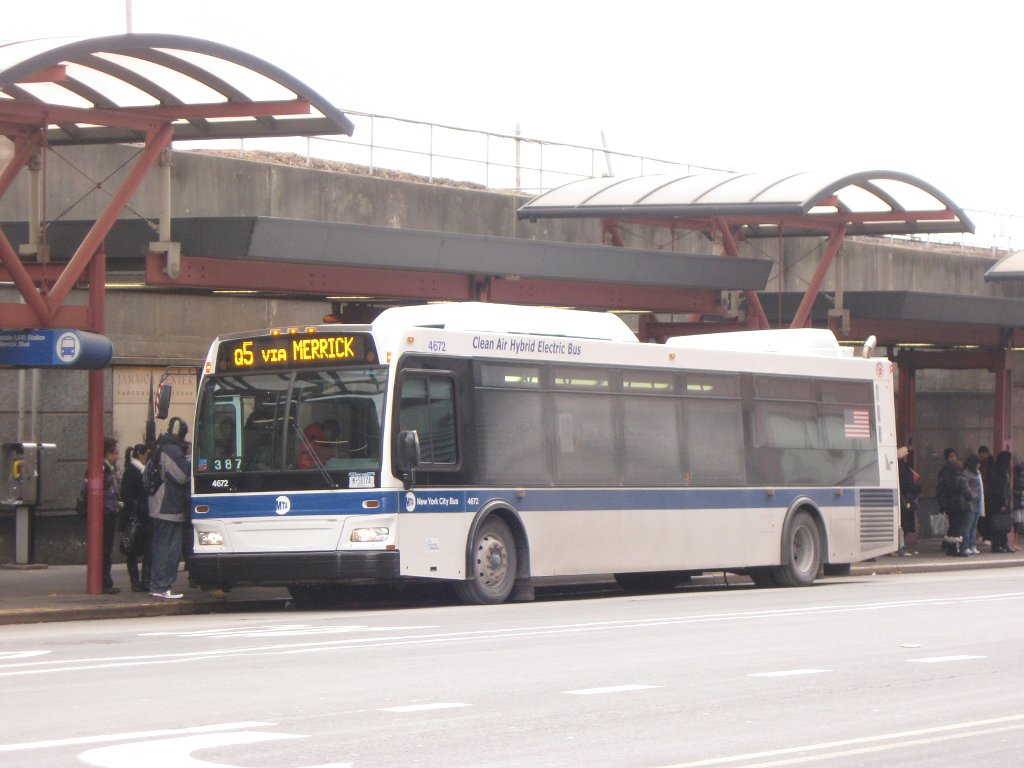
A 2010 Orion VII NG HEV (4672) on the Q5 entering southbound service at the Jamaica Center Bus Terminal.

The Q5 begins at Bay A of the Jamaica Center Bus Terminal, traveling southeast down nearly the entire length of Merrick Boulevard in Queens. On weekdays, Q5 buses terminate at 233rd Street, Merrick Boulevard (near Francis Lewis Boulevard, Brookville Boulevard and the Belt Parkway) with weekday service to Green Acres Mall being provided by the Q87 east of that point. On weekends, Q5 buses run to Green Acres Mall when it is open and to the Rosedale LIRR station when the mall is closed. The Q86 does not run on weekend nights, and the Q87 does not run at night on any day of the week. At the county line, the route turns south along Hook Creek Boulevard to Conduit Avenue. The Green Acres branch travels east along Conduit Avenue, which becomes the Sunrise Highway in Nassau County, then makes a clockwise loop around the Green Acres Mall, terminating at the parking structure at West Circle Drive. The Rosedale branch travels west along Conduit Avenue and ends at Francis Lewis Boulevard, with service heading back to Jamaica via Brookville Boulevard.

When school is in session, four extra trips run to Jamaica from three different points of origin. Two buses depart from 108th Avenue near P.S./I.S. 116 William C. Hughley at 2:30 and 2:32pm; one bus departs from 233rd Street at P.S./I.S. 270 Gordon Parks at 2:25pm; and one bus departs from Springfield Boulevard near I.S. 059 Springfield Gardens at 2:40pm.

=== Q86 and Q87 ===
The Q86 and Q87 begins Bay B making limited stops on the portions of the routes that operate on Merrick Boulevard; the Q86 and Q87 make local stops on Merrick Boulevard east of Springfield Boulevard. At Brookville Boulevard, the Q86 turns south, running to Francis Lewis Boulevard and turning southeast. At Conduit Avenue–243rd Street, the Q86 then runs along 243rd Street, sharing the street with the Q85. While the Q85 terminates at 147th Avenue, the Q86 continues farther into Rosedale. The Q86 terminates at the intersection of 253rd Street and 149th Avenue. The Q87, meanwhile, continues east past Brookville Boulevard to the intersection of Merrick and Hook Creek Boulevards, where the route turns south along Hook Creek Boulevard to Conduit Avenue. It then turns east to serve Green Acres Mall.

=== Q85 and Q89 ===
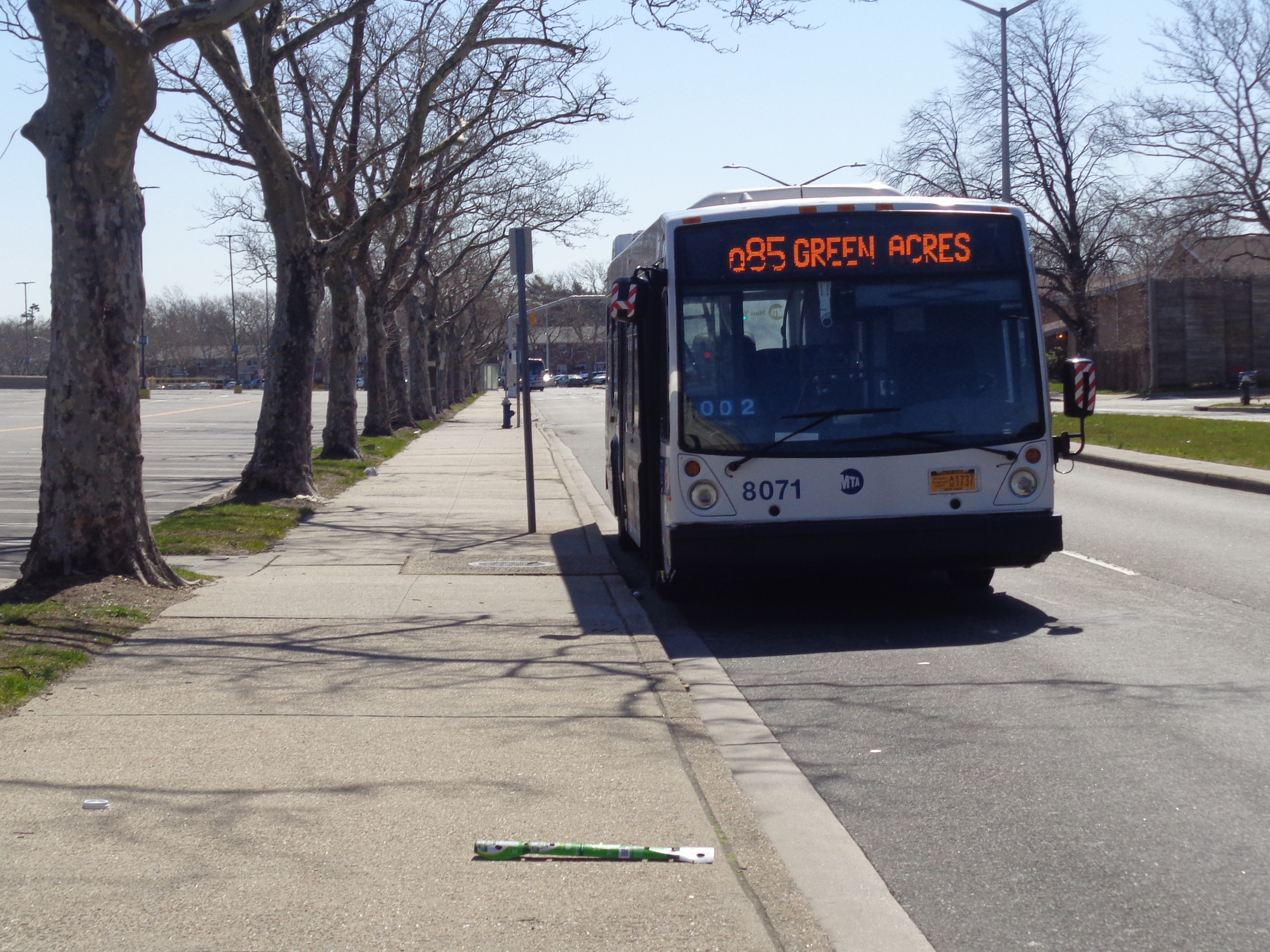
A 2011 Nova Bus LFS (8071) on the Q85, terminated at Green Acres Mall.

The Q85 and Q89 begins at Bay C of the Jamaica Center Bus Terminal, running down Merrick Boulevard to Baisley Boulevard and 120th Avenue in St. Albans. They then turn south along Baisley Boulevard and run Bedell Street (adjacent to the tracks of the Long Island Rail Road's Montauk Branch near Rochdale Village), and 140th Avenue to Springfield Boulevard. The Q85 and Q89 routes then turn south along Springfield Boulevard to Conduit Avenue, then east along Conduit Avenue, along the former Brooklyn-Freeport Line streetcar route. At Francis Lewis Boulevard near the Rosedale LIRR station, the Q85 and Q89 split. The Q85 turns south along 243rd Street and terminates at the intersection of 147th Avenue and Huxley Street, with a transfer to the Q111 to continue farther east along 147th Avenue. The Q89 continues a short distance east along Conduit Avenue/Sunrise Highway into Nassau County, terminating at Green Acres Mall.

When school is in session, several Q85 buses operate to Jamaica from three different points of origin. Three buses depart from George Washington Carver High School at 144th Avenue between 2:36 and 3:02pm; two depart from the Rosedale LIRR station at 2:34 and 2:36pm; and two depart from MS 355 CAMS and St. Francis College at 145th Avenue, heading straight on Springfield Boulevard to its regular route. In addition, one extra trip departs from Jamaica Center at 2:05pm and terminates at Huxley Street without using the turnaround in Brookville.

=== Other routes ===
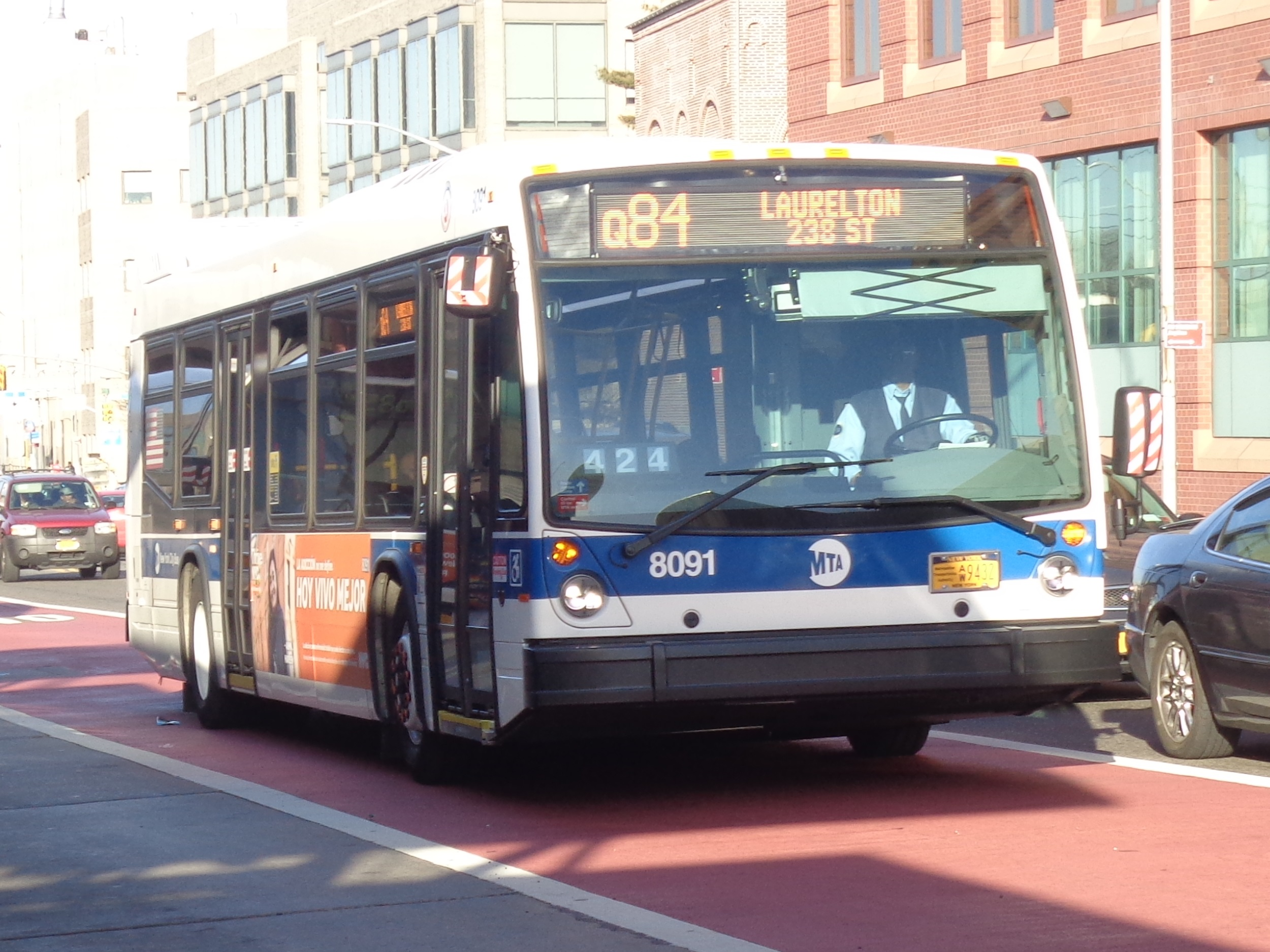
A 2015 Nova Bus LFS (8091) on the Laurelton-bound Q84 leaving Jamaica Center on an offset bus lane in Jamaica in April 2016.

Merrick Boulevard is also served by the following:

- The Q4 and Q84 rush routes provide additional service south of Archer Avenue, making limited stops on Merrick Boulevard and local stops elsewhere. At Linden Boulevard, the Q4 turns east towards Cambria Heights. At the intersection of Baisley Boulevard and 120th Avenue, the Q84 turns east along 120th Avenue towards Laurelton near the Montefiore Cemetery.
- The Jamaica-bound Q1, Q17, Q30, Q31, Q43, Q75, n6/n6X, n22/n22X, n24, and select n1 and n26 buses use the one-way stretch of the boulevard from Hillside Avenue to Jamaica Avenue.
- The n4 local and the n4X express services of the Nassau Inter-County Express also run along Merrick Boulevard from Jamaica to the county line, continuing along Merrick Road to Freeport in Nassau County. These buses, however, only make pick-ups towards Freeport and drop-offs towards Jamaica within Queens.

==== Express bus service ====
The QM63 express bus begins in Rosedale, and runs along Francis Lewis Boulevard (the former Q5S route), 249th Street, Hook Creek Boulevard, and Merrick Boulevard to Linden Boulevard. It then turns west along Linden Boulevard towards Midtown Manhattan.

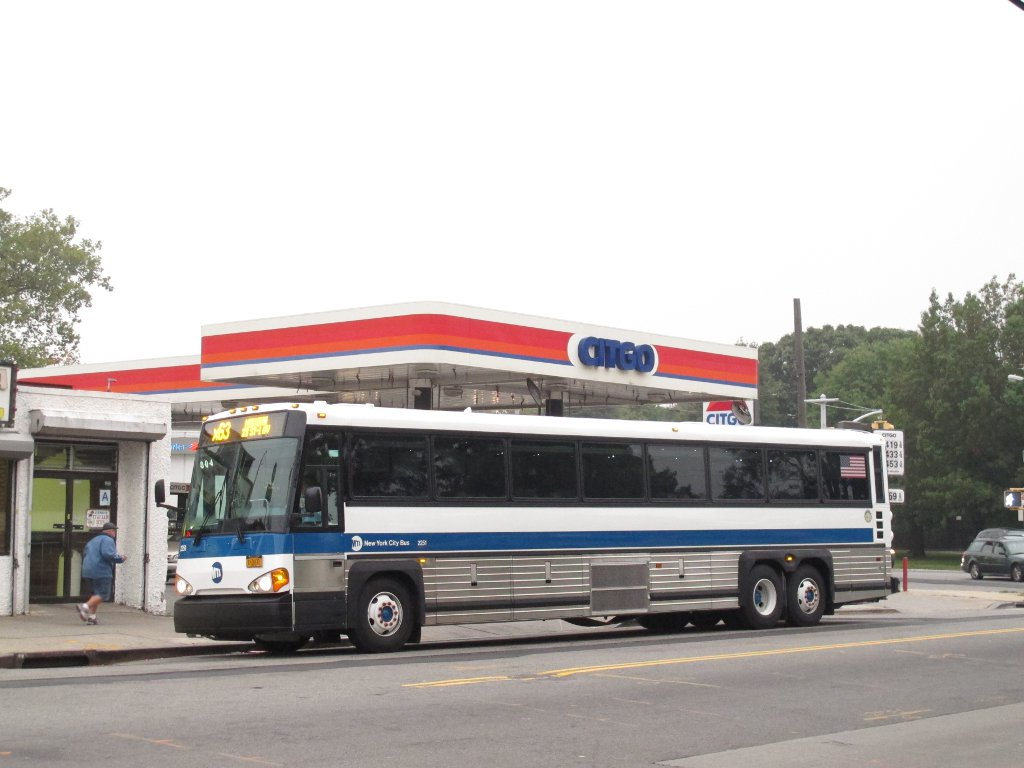
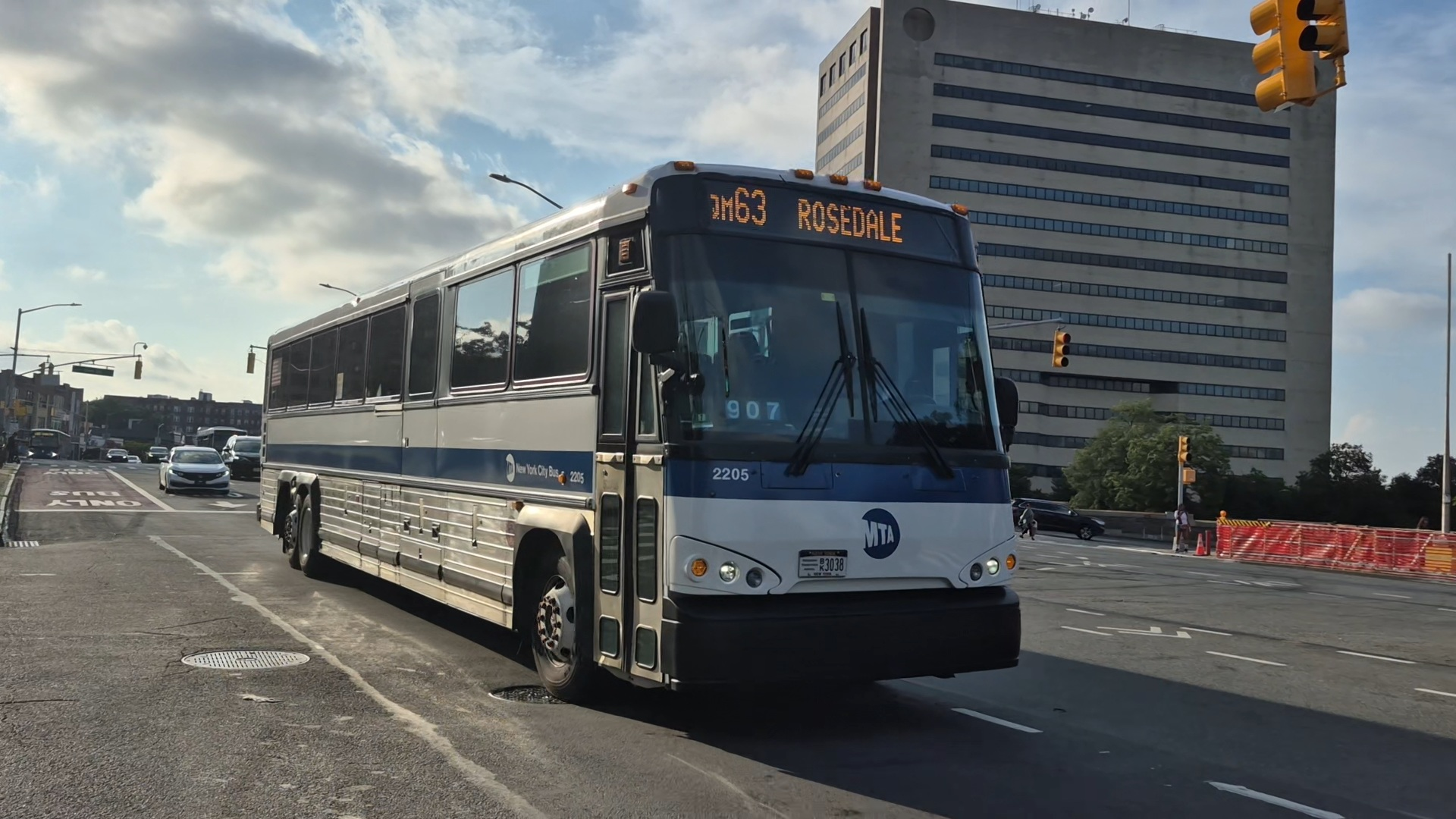
Two Motor Coach D4500CTs on the QM63/X63: 2251 in Rosedale, bound for Midtown in 2012 (top), and 2205 on Union Turnpike in Kew Gardens, bound for Rosedale in July 2025 (bottom), respectively

== History ==
=== Early history ===
On August 9, 1921, the Orange Bus Line began service along Merrick Road from Freeport in Nassau County to Rosedale in Queens near the county border. On September 15, 1921, the route was extended west and north to the Jamaica business district. In 1922, Republic Motor Truck Company dealer Henry B. Carter sold two truck chassis fitted with bus bodies to the operators of the Orange Line. On February 13, 1922, the Orange Line ceased operations, and the buses reverted to Carter's ownership. Carter's new Bee-Line Bus Company operated its first bus, without a franchise, on February 19, between the Rosedale station and Jamaica. This was the predecessor to the Q5. With only two buses, the route originally operated on half-hour headways. In addition to Jamaica-Rosedale service, on April 3, 1926, Bee-Line began operating service along Merrick Road between Jamaica and Freeport, Long Island, replacing the eastern portion of the Brooklyn-Freeport Line streetcar. Bee Line originally operated from 163rd Street and Jamaica Avenue in the Jamaica business district. On October 1, 1930, the Bee Line routes began terminating at the newly constructed Jamaica Union Bus Terminal near its former terminus. The new bus terminal was located at Jamaica Avenue and New York Boulevard (now Guy R. Brewer Boulevard), adjacent to the now-closed Union Hall Street Long Island Rail Road station.

The Q5A services were first operated by Transit Coach Corporation in 1931. By 1937, Schenck Transportation operated the route. By 1938, the Q5A was operated by the North Shore Bus Company.

On August 11, 1936, the Bee-Line routes were moved to the newly opened 165th Street Bus Terminal (then the Long Island Bus Terminal). In May 1939, Bee-Line relinquished its Queens routes. These routes began operation from the terminal under North Shore Bus Company on June 25, 1939, as part of the company's takeover of nearly all routes in Zone D (Jamaica and Southeast Queens). The Queens-Nassau County Merrick route was retained by Bee-Line; it is now the n4 of the Nassau Inter-County Express. The northern terminus of the Q4, Q4A (predecessor to the Q84), Q5, and Q5A was moved once again to Hillside Avenue and 168th Street, near the 169th Street station of the IND Queens Boulevard Line, on October 27, 1939. In 1941, the Q5A Farmers Boulevard service was extended from the Higbie Avenue station on the Long Island Rail Road to Springfield Boulevard.

=== NYCTA operation ===
On March 30, 1947, North Shore Bus would be taken over by the New York City Board of Transportation (later the New York City Transit Authority), making the bus routes city operated.

On November 29, 1956, the NYCTA approved a large slate of cuts in bus service citywide to take effect January 22, 1957. Initially, the Q5S route was planned to be discontinued as part of the changes. However, due to requests by the Queens Borough President and civic groups, the cut was averted. Instead, free transfers were made available at the terminal in Laurelton. Sunday service was discontinued on February 3, 1957, but was restored on August 4. On August 24, 1957, the NYCTA announced that this service would be discontinued on September 8 if ridership did not increase. The NYCTA had lost $30 each Sunday the service was operated.

The Bedell Street branch of the Q5A began operation on August 9, 1964, to serve Rochdale Village and reduce congestion on the other routes along Merrick Boulevard. This branch would start at Bedell Avenue and 133rd Avenue, run along Bedell Avenue, Baisley Boulevard, Merrick Boulevard, 168th Street, 88th Avenue, and 168th Place, and then would run via Hillside Avenue east of 167th Street. Service would return by Hillside Avenue, Merrick Boulevard to the 165th Street bus terminal, Merrick Boulevard, Baisley Boulevard and Bedell Street. This service, which was requested by Queens Borough President Mario J. Cariello, would run weekdays between 6 a.m. and 12 a.m., and from 10 a.m. to 6 p.m. on weekends and holidays. Rush hour service would be every ten minutes, and every 20 minutes during weekdays off-peak, and Sundays and holidays, and every 15 minutes on Saturdays. Early morning service on this branch was added at some point afterwards.

On September 10, 1973, to better serve Rosedale, Q5A service was scheduled to be extended 0.5 miles (0.80 km) to 253rd Street and 149th Avenue, and Jamaica-bound service was rerouted off of Brookville Boulevard and onto 243rd Street. The new route had been approved by Community Board 13 in December 1972. On September 14, 1973, members of the Rosedale Block Association, who had refused to let buses travel along Huxley Avenue between 147th Avenue and 149th Avenue met with Queens Borough President Manes. Residents claimed that the street was too narrow for buses and that the street was too prone to flooding after rainstorms. By this date, Q5A buses did not attempt to use the new route, and the NYCTA did not plan to do so until an agreement was reached with residents.

On April 20, 1975, to cut costs, service on the Farmers Boulevard branch to Huxley Street between 1:15 a.m. and 5 a.m. was eliminated. Early morning service via Bedell Street was maintained.

On September 11, 1983, service on the Q5AB was increased, and service on the Q5A was increased in February 1984. On October 5, 1983, the NYCTA held a public hearing on a proposal to add three buses in both the AM and PM peaks on the Q5AB, reducing headways from 5.5 to 4 minutes.

On December 15, 1985, the NYCTA announced it was reconsidering its plan to adjust service to Rochdale Village, and would conduct a survey with community input over the following three to four weeks. Many local residents were opposed to NYCTA's plan to consolidate the Q5A and Q5AB routes. Bus service along the seven blocks on Farmers Boulevard between Bedell Street and Merrick Boulevard would be discontinued.

=== Archer Avenue changes ===
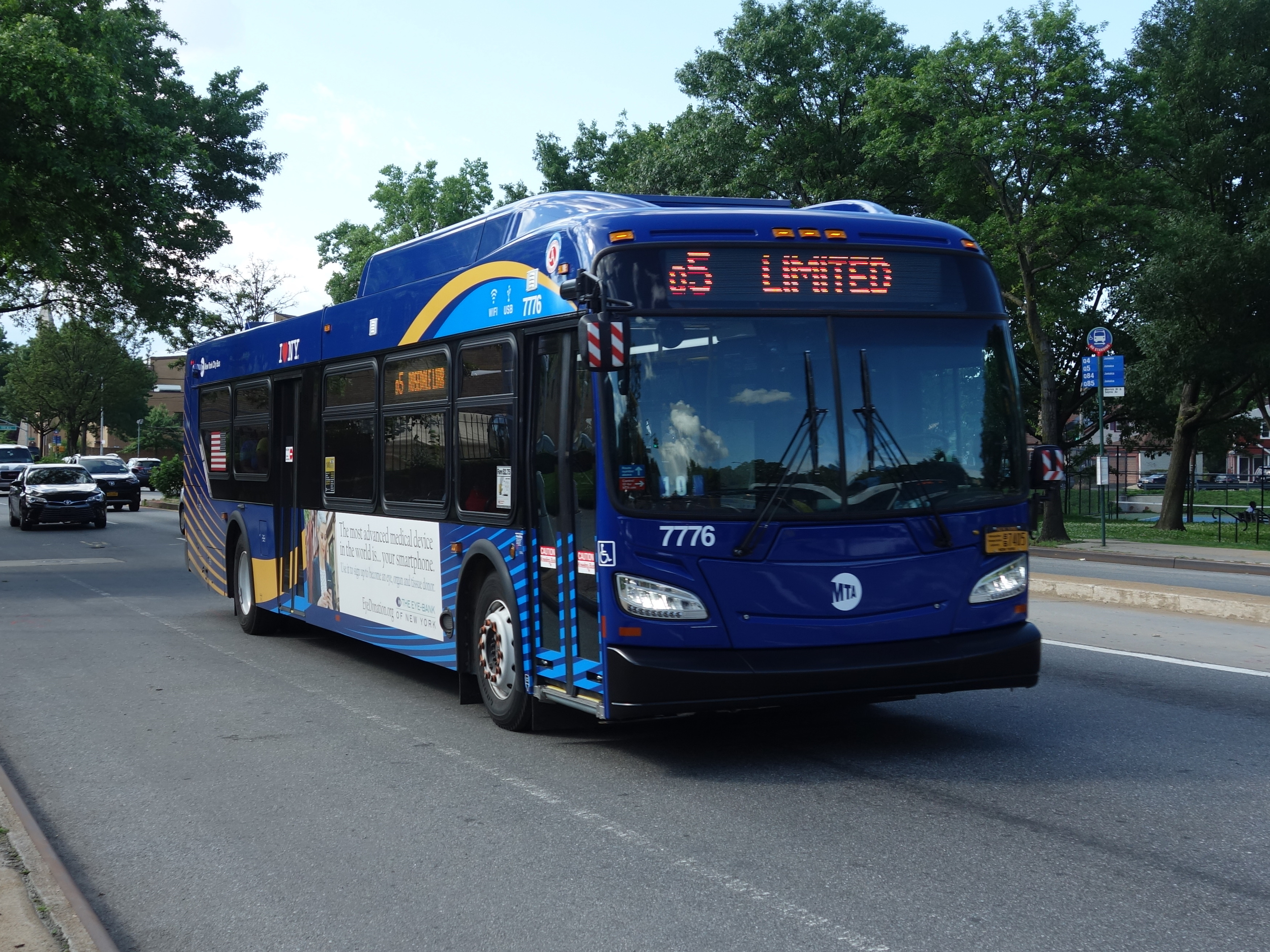
A 2018 New Flyer XD40 (7776) on the Q5 Limited on Merrick Boulevard in 2019, six years prior to the first phase of the Queens Bus Network Redesign.

On September 10, 1987, the NYCTA held a public hearing on a series of proposed changes in bus service in Southeast Queens. Three of the changes involved bus service on Merrick Boulevard. One change was the combination of the Q5A, which ran to 243rd Street and 147th Avenue in Rosedale via Conduit Avenue, with the Q5AB Bedell Street route, which ran to Rochdale, to form the Q85, with reduced service on Merrick Boulevard. These routes had been operated as a single service during late evenings and early mornings. The other two changes in Merrick Boulevard service would extend the Q5 by 0.75 miles (1.21 km) to serve the Green Acres Shopping Center, and the discontinuation of the Q5AS Laurelton Shuttle, which had low ridership. The changes were slated to take effect on September 13, 1987. The Q5 was extended to the Green Acres Shopping Center on November 15, 1987.

On December 11, 1988, in conjunction with the opening of the Archer Avenue Subway, the Merrick Boulevard routes' northern terminal was moved to the Jamaica Center Bus Terminal. That same day, the Q4A was renumbered Q84, the Q85 was created, and the Q5S became the original Q86. At this time, the Q5A Laurelton Shuttle (then the Q5AS) was discontinued.

In March 1992, merchants in Jamaica criticized a NYCTA proposal to extend the Q85 to Green Acres Shopping Center in Valley Stream as they believed it would divert shoppers from their stores to promote economic development in Nassau County. The proposal was spurred due to surveys showing that people in Southeast Queens wanted additional service to the mall. This extension took effect on September 20, 1992, with buses running to the mall every 25 minutes between 9 a.m. and 12 a.m.

In 1993, the routes began traveling on Archer Avenue in both directions. Previously, terminating buses traveled along Archer Avenue, while southbound buses traveled via Jamaica Avenue.

On January 10, 1994, limited-stop service on the Q85 began, with all weekday peak-direction trips (between 6:35 a.m. and 8:50 a.m. westbound, and 4:00 p.m. and 7:20 p.m.) on the Rosedale branch being converted to limiteds. The limited-stop service reduced travel times by three to five minutes. Morning limiteds made limited stops between the intersections of Bedell Street and Baisley Boulevard and Liberty Avenue and Merrick Boulevard, while those in the afternoon made limited-stops between the intersections of Parsons Boulevard and Archer Avenue and Baisley Boulevard and Bedell Street. Limited service and improved operations, reduced annual operating costs by $24,600. A survey of over 575 riders was conducted in July 1994. 57 percent of those surveyed said that travel time decreased, and 77 percent said that they wanted limited service to be extended from Baisley Boulevard to Farmers Boulevard. It was decided not to extend limited service due to higher ridership at intermediate stops at 130th Street and 133rd Street. In January 1995, after an evaluation of the service, it was recommended to continue operating the Q85 limited, and that a limited-stop be added on the Q4, Q5, and Q85 at 109th Avenue and Merrick Boulevard.

The 1.5-mile (2.4 km)-long Q86 was discontinued in 1996, originally expected to be June 1995, due to low ridership. The original Q86 was a short feeder route to the LIRR station at Rosedale, and to mitigate its loss, a UniTicket fare agreement to the Q85 was provided. The route had 200 daily riders, saving $170,000 in annual operating expenses. It had operated during rush hours only, between 5:30 and 9:30 a.m. and 2:50 and 7:50 p.m.. The route's cost recovery ratio of 29 percent was well below New York City Transit's guideline of 50 percent. The NYCTA considered extending the Q85 along the Q86's route, running eastward from its terminal at Huxley Street and 147th Avenue to Francis Lewis Boulevard, and then northbound along the Q86 route to Rosedale station. It was dismissed for inconveniencing Q85 riders and because the cost of the extension would negate the cost saving. Due to high ridership and congestion, the corridor has been identified as a potential bus rapid transit corridor under the city's Select Bus Service (SBS) program. Though it was one of five priority corridors selected for SBS in 2004, the Merrick Boulevard corridor was eventually scrapped because of community opposition related to loss of parking. The Merrick Boulevard corridor was not listed as a potential SBS corridor by the 2010s. The corridor is also frequented by dollar vans, which parallel the bus routes.

In September 2003, limited-stop service on the Q4, Q5, and Q85 was expanded during AM rush hours, beginning earlier in the morning. On January 14, 2004, the MTA instituted the current limited-stop bypass in the Jamaica business district via Liberty Avenue and 160th Street.

=== Former service patterns ===
The Q85 was originally two separate routes, the Q5A and Q5AB. The Q5A ran from Jamaica along Merrick Boulevard, turning south at Springfield Boulevard (along the current Q77 route). It proceeded along Springfield Boulevard, Conduit Avenue (then called the Sunrise Highway), and 243rd Street to 147th Avenue and Huxley Street. It was known as the Jamaica-Rosedale or Jamaica-Huxley Street Line, or as the Laurelton Shuttle. By the 1970s, the Q5A was rerouted from Springfield Boulevard to Farmers Boulevard.

The Q5AB, originally the second branch of the Q5A called the Higbie Avenue branch, turned south from Merrick Boulevard at Farmers Boulevard to serve the Locust Manor LIRR station and the now-closed Higbie Avenue LIRR station at modern-day 140th Avenue. The route terminated either at Higbie Avenue or Springfield Boulevard in Locust Manor, or merged with the Q5A at Springfield Boulevard before continuing to Rosedale at either 147th Avenue or 225th Street and Conduit Avenue. The route was later renamed Q5AB and rerouted to Baisley Boulevard and Bedell Street, corresponding to the current Q85 Farmers Boulevard local service.

There were also additional Q5 services. The first was known as the Q5 Laurelton Station line, the Q5B, and later the Q5A-LS or Q5AS (Laurelton Shuttle). It operated as a north–south shuttle on 224th, 226th, and 229th Streets between the Laurelton LIRR station and 131st Avenue in the Laurelton neighborhood, one block south of the Montefiore Cemetery. It was later moved from 224th Street to 225th Street, and extended south to 147th Avenue and east to 243rd Street. The second, the Q5S, was a shuttle along Francis Lewis Boulevard between the Rosedale LIRR station at Conduit Avenue and 147th Drive at the southeast corner of Queens. Both these routes were later discontinued.

Before 2025, the full-time Q5 route turned west a short distance along Sunrise Highway (which runs between South Conduit Avenue and the Long Island Rail Road Atlantic Branch at this location), terminating at the Rosedale LIRR station at Francis Lewis Boulevard. These buses reentered service towards Jamaica via Francis Lewis Boulevard and Brookville Boulevard. This was the original Q5 route, also known as the Rosedale Station Line. Since 2025, this routing has been served by a combination of the Q86 on Brookdale Boulevard and the Q89 on Sunrise Highway.

=== Later improvements ===
In 2007, the MTA and the New York City Department of Transportation (NYCDOT) proposed converting the Q5 Limited to Select Bus Service, the city's version of Bus Rapid Transit. The Q5 SBS would have run every 5 to 8 minutes, while no changes would be made to local service. On March 26, 2007, members of Community Board 13 spoke out against the proposal because parking on Merrick Boulevard would have been eliminated for peak hour bus lanes. At the time, the NYCDOT expected the changes to go into effect no later than 2008.

==== Queens bus redesign ====
In December 2019, the MTA released a draft redesign of the Queens bus network. As part of the redesign, the Merrick Bolevard buses would have contained one high-density "intra-borough" route, the QT18. The Q5 would have been replaced by a "subway connector" route with nonstop section on Merrick Boulevard, the QT42. The Q85 would have been replaced by a "subway connector", the QT43, that would instead run on Guy R. Brewer Boulevard. The redesign was delayed due to the COVID-19 pandemic in New York City in 2020, and the original draft plan was dropped due to negative feedback.

A revised plan was released in March 2022. As part of the new plan, the Q25 would be extended south to Merrick Boulevard, providing local service there. The Q5 and Q85 would become "zone" routes with nonstop sections on Merrick Boulevard, with the Q5 taking over the Q85 branch to 243rd Street. A new "zone" route, the Q86 (unrelated to the former Rosedale feeder route), would take over the Q5 branch to Green Acres Mall.

A final bus-redesign plan was released in December 2023. Under this plan, the Q25 would not serve the corridor; instead, the Q5 would become a limited route terminating at Merrick Boulevard and 233rd Street, making local stops along the corridor. The Q85 would become a zone route, as in the previous plan, and two new zone routes would be created. The Q86 zone route would travel along Brookville Boulevard and 243rd Street to Rosedale, using the old routing of the Q5 nighttime branch and the Q85 branch to Rosedale, and the Q87 zone route would travel along Merrick Boulevard and Hook Creek Boulevard to Green Acres Mall, using the old routing of the Q5 daytime branch. These new routes would provide more frequent service along existing branches of the Q5 and Q85.

On December 17, 2024, addendums to the final plan were released. Among these, stop changes were made along the corridor, and weekend frequencies on the Q5 were altered for customer benefits. The Q5 retained its truncated route for weekday service, terminating at 233rd Street. The Green Acres and Rosedale branches of the Q5 and Q85 routes were split into four rush routes—the Q85, Q86, Q87, and Q89. The Q85 and Q86 would travel to Rosedale, while the Q87 and Q89 would travel to Green Acres Mall. The Q85 and Q89 would use the existing Q85's routing via Bedell Street and Conduit Avenue, while the Q86 and Q87 would use the existing Q5's routing via Merrick Boulevard. The Q5 would continue to serve Green Acres during the day and Rosedale late nights when the Q87 does not run. This change would clarify the previous service patterns, where the Q85 and Q5 each had three different route variants depending on the time of day. On January 29, 2025, the current plan was approved by the MTA Board, and the Queens Bus Redesign went into effect in two different phases during Summer 2025. The sole Q5 route was changed from “Limited” to “Local” after the approval, and all five routes were assigned to Phase I, which launched on June 29, 2025. The Q87 was to run weekdays only, but is operating every day as of 2026.
