= Q4 and Q51 buses =

Bus routes in Queens, New York

q4 rush q51 ltd
- Merrick Boulevard−Linden Boulevard; Q4: Jamaica−St. Albans−Cambria Heights; Q51: Cambria Heights-Ozone Park
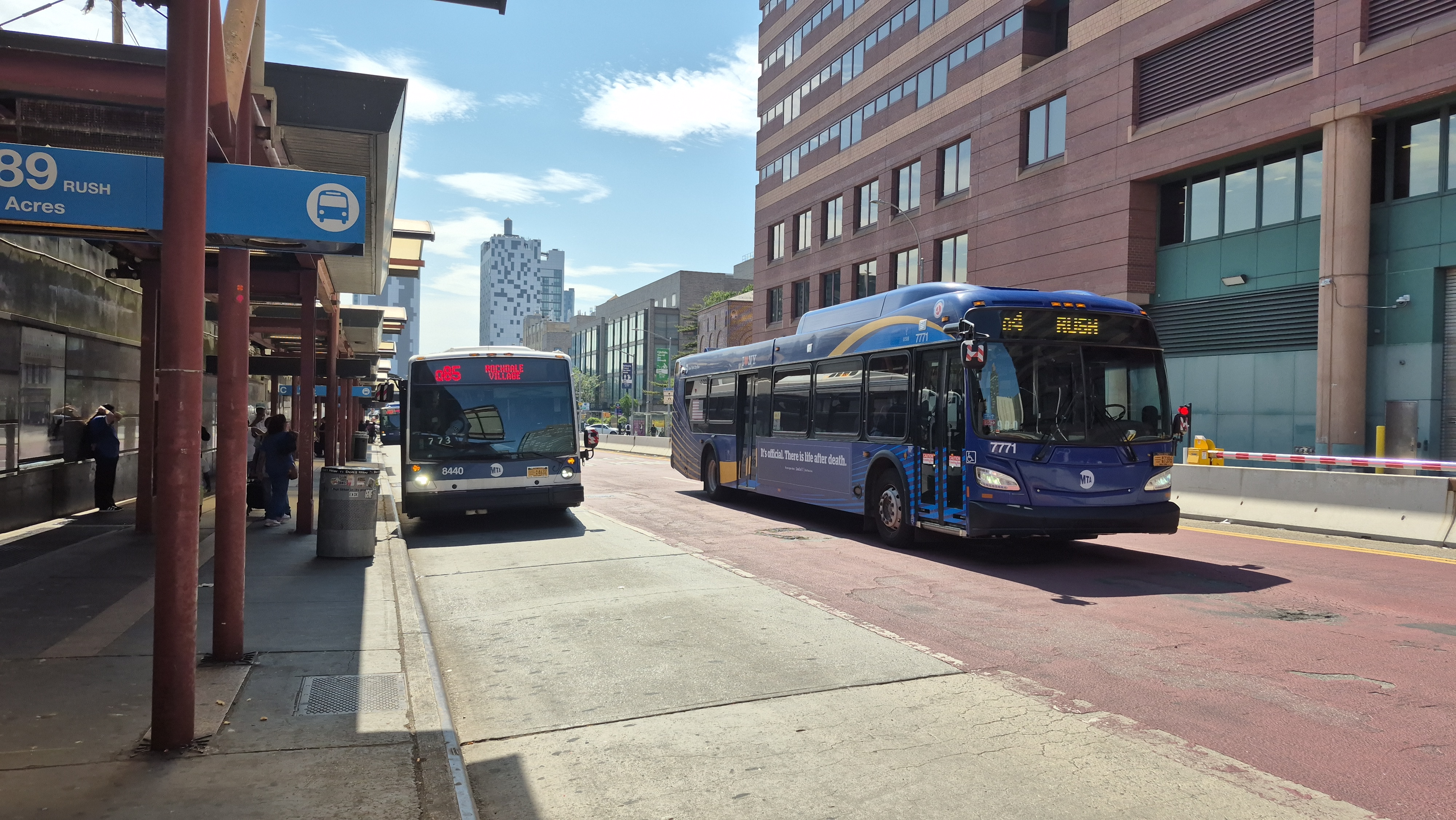
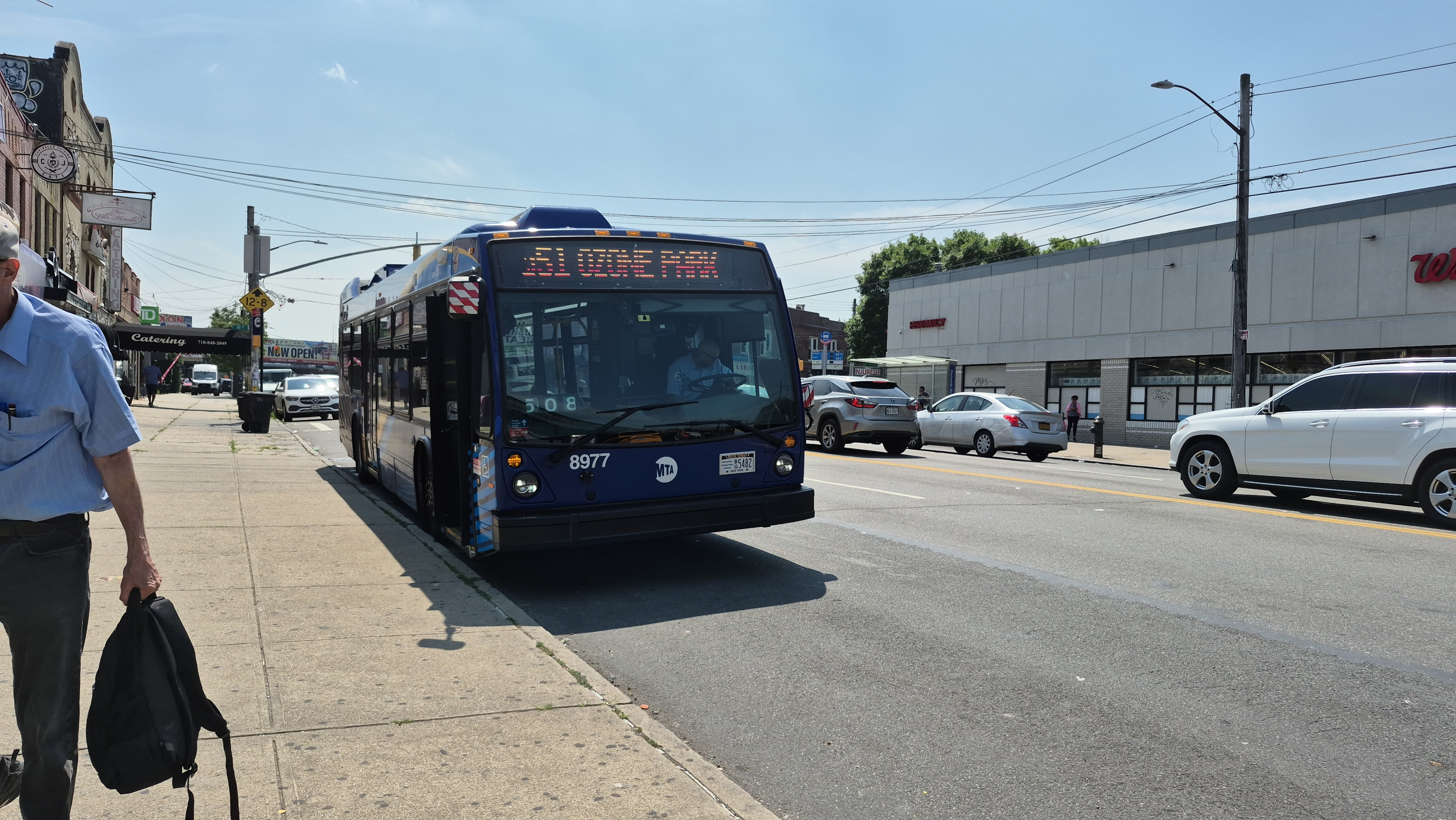
- A 2019 NFI XD40 (7771) on the Q4 Rush exiting Jamaica Center and a 2023 Nova LFS (8977) on the Q51 Limited at its western terminal in Ozone Park.

Overview
- System: MTA Regional Bus Operations
- Operator: New York City Transit Authority (Q4); MTA Bus Company (Q51)
- Garage: Jamaica Depot (Q4); Baisley Park Depot (Q51)
- Vehicle: Nova Bus LFS; New Flyer Xcelsior XD40 (Q4 only)

Route
- Locale: Queens, New York, U.S.
- Communities served: Jamaica, South Jamaica, St. Albans, Cambria Heights, Ozone Park
- Start: Q4: Jamaica Center – Parsons/Archer Bus Terminal – Bay C Q51: Ozone Park – Rockaway Boulevard station
- Via: Merrick Boulevard, Linden Boulevard
- End: Cambria Heights – 235th Street (Q4); Cambria Heights – Springfield Boulevard (Q51)
- Length: 5.0 miles (8.0 km) (Q4); 5.7 miles (9.2 km) (Q51)
- Other routes: Q5 Merrick Boulevard; Q84 Merrick Blvd/120th Avenue; Q85/Q89 Merrick/Conduit Blvds; Q86/Q87 Merrick Boulevard

Service
- Operates: 24 hours (Q4); 4:20 a.m. to 10:40 p.m. (Q51)
- Annual patronage: 1,646,765 (Q4, 2025); 204,900 (Q51, 2025)
- Transfers: Yes
- Timetable: Q4 Q51

The Q4 and Q51 bus routes constitute a public transit corridor running along Merrick Boulevard and the easternmost portion of Linden Boulevard in southeastern Queens, New York City. The Q4 runs from the Jamaica Center–York College station to Cambria Heights near the Queens–Nassau County border. The Q51 runs from the Rockaway Boulevard station in Ozone Park to Springfield Boulevard in Cambria Heights; the two routes share Linden Boulevard between Merrick Boulevard and Springfield Boulevard. The Q4 is operated by MTA Regional Bus Operations under the New York City Transit brand. The Q51 is operated by MTA Bus Company.

What is now the Q4 began service in November 1919, running from Jamaica to 201st Street in St. Albans. The franchise was extended to 223rd Street in Cambria Heights in 1931. The Q4 was originally operated by Bee-Line Incorporated and later the North Shore Bus Company until 1947. The Jamaica terminal has been changed several times throughout the route's history. The Q51 began service in 2025.

== Route description and service ==
=== Q4 ===
The Q4's western terminus is Bay C of the Jamaica Center Bus Terminal. It runs east on Archer Avenue to Merrick Boulevard, then south along Merrick Boulevard to Linden Boulevard. This corridor is shared with the Q5, Q85 and the Q84 (formerly the Q4A). The Q4 then diverges east along Linden Boulevard, running through St. Albans and Cambria Heights. The route's eastern terminus is at 235th Street adjacent to the Cross Island Parkway, which marks the border with North Valley Stream in Nassau County. Travel into Nassau County requires walking several blocks east to Elmont Road to transfer to the n1 route of the Nassau Inter-County Express. The Q4 operates out of the Jamaica Bus Depot on Merrick Boulevard near Jamaica Center, as do several other routes in southeast Queens. The Q4 is classified as a "rush" route, making limited stops on Merrick Boulevard and local stops elsewhere.

When school is in session, one bus departs I.S. 192 The Linden at 204th Street & 111th Avenue for Jamaica at 2:40pm, and three buses depart a high school complex at 116th Avenue & Francis Lewis Boulevard for Jamaica at 2:58, 3:02, and 3:15pm. All head to Linden Boulevard via Francis Lewis Boulevard, with the former turning around 204th Street and Hollis Avenue. In addition, two more buses to Jamaica originate at Francis Lewis Boulevard on the regular route at 3:10 and 3:44pm. All trippers make the usual “rush” stops within Jamaica.

=== Q51 ===
The Q51's western terminus is the Rockaway Boulevard station of the New York City Subway, served by the A train. It travels southeast along Rockaway Boulevard before turning east at Linden Boulevard. The route's eastern terminus is at Springfield Boulevard, where the Q51 turns back west via Springfield Boulevard and Francis Lewis Boulevard. The Q51 is classified as a limited-stop route.

=== Express bus service ===
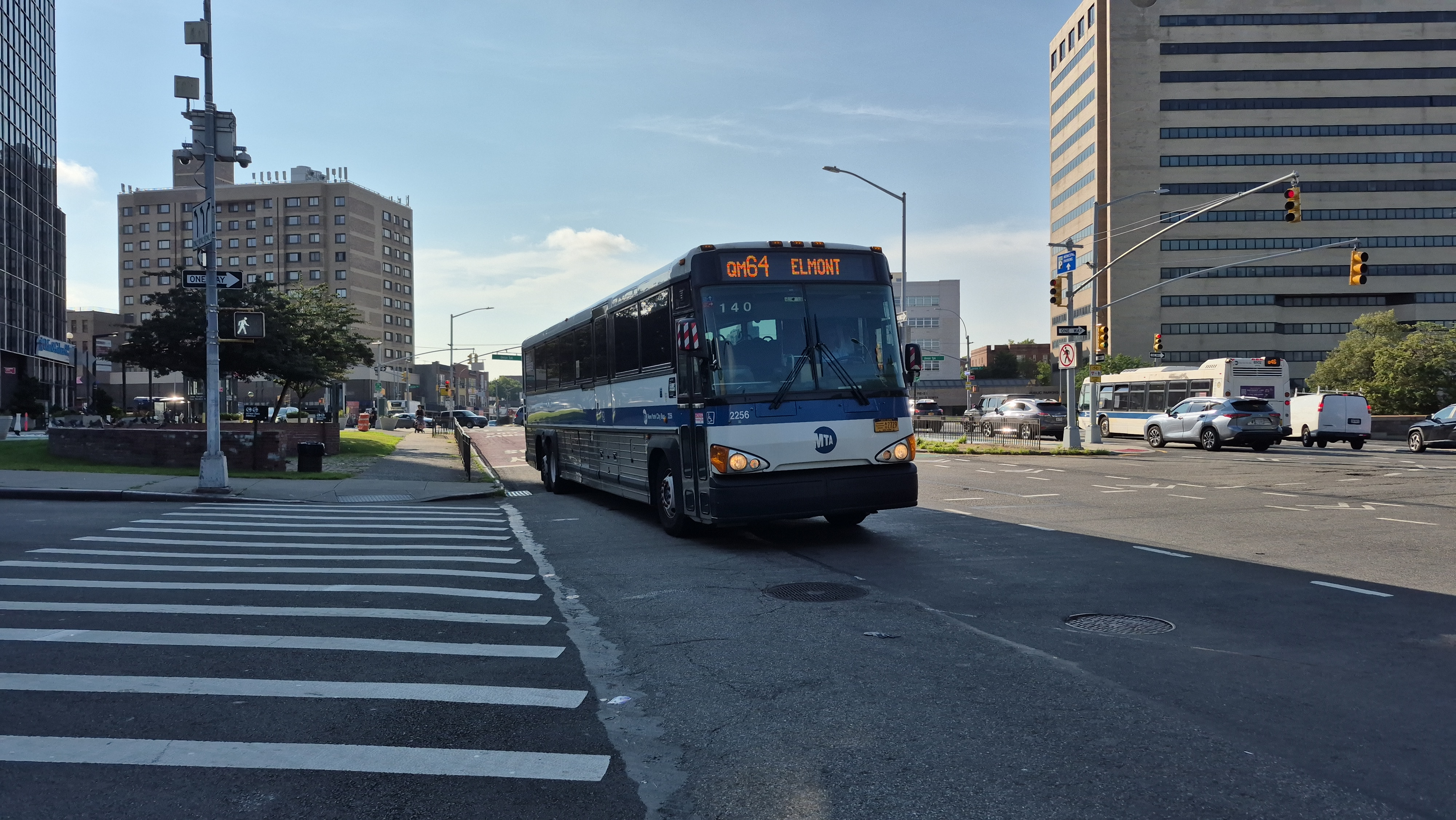
2013 MCI D4500CT #2256 on the QM64

The QM64 express bus begins at Elmont, running along Linden Boulevard to Farmers Boulevard. It then runs on Farmers Boulevard, Liberty Avenue, the Van Wyck Expressway, and Queens Boulevard towards Midtown Manhattan.

== History ==
=== 1910s to 1930s ===
What is now the Q4 began service in November 1919, running from Union Hall Street station in Jamaica along Merrick Road (Merrick Boulevard) and Central Avenue (also known as Foch Boulevard or Westchester Avenue; today's Linden Boulevard) to Bank Street (now 201st Street) in St. Albans, just west of Francis Lewis Boulevard. In December 1923, Bee Line, Inc started operating the route. At this time, service on the eastern portion of the line to Springfield Avenue (Springfield Boulevard) was provided by Bee Line's Farmers Avenue (Farmers Boulevard) route (today's Q3). The exception was a three-week period in July 1927, when Merrick Boulevard-Central Avenue service was extended east to Springfield during construction on Farmers Avenue.

Bee Line originally operated from 163rd Street and Jamaica Avenue in the Jamaica business district. On October 1, 1930, the Bee Line routes began terminating at the newly constructed Jamaica Union Bus Terminal near its former terminus. The new bus terminal was located at Jamaica Avenue and New York Boulevard (now Guy R. Brewer Boulevard), adjacent to the Union Hall Street station. As constituted in December 1930, the Jamaica-St. Albans route (designated Route No. 4) ran along Merrick Road and Central Avenue to Farmers Boulevard, south along Farmers to 119th Avenue, then east along 119th Avenue (the current Q84 route) to 196th Street. In January 1931, the city altered the franchise (designated "Q-4") to continue on Central Avenue to 223rd Street in Cambria Heights.

On August 11, 1936, the Bee-Line routes were moved to the newly opened 165th Street Bus Terminal (then the Long Island Bus Terminal). In early 1939, the Q4 franchise was awarded to North Shore Bus Company; at this time, the Cambria Heights Civic Association requested an extension of the route from 227th Street to 236th Street at the Nassau County border. In May 1939, Bee-Line relinquished its Queens routes including the Q4. These routes began operation from the terminal under North Shore Bus Company on June 25, 1939, as part of the company's takeover of nearly all routes in Zone D (Jamaica and Southeast Queens). The northern terminus of the Q4, Q4A (predecessor to the Q84), Q5, and Q5A was moved once again to Hillside Avenue and 168th Street, near the 169th Street station of the IND Queens Boulevard Line, on October 27, 1939.

=== 1940s to 2000s ===
In early 1945, the Q4 was extended from 227th Street to its current terminus at 235th Street near the county line. At this time, short run service was operated to Francis Lewis Boulevard. Following the extension, the route was frequented by residents of nearby Valley Stream towards Jamaica. This led to crowding on the route and complaints from Queens passengers. On March 30, 1947, North Shore Bus would be taken over by the New York City Board of Transportation (later the New York City Transit Authority [NYCTA]), making the bus routes city operated. Under municipal operations, service on the Q4 was increased on April 3 of that year.

On October 5, 1983, the NYCTA held a public hearing on a proposal to introduce zone express service on the Q4, with short-line local service from Francis Lewis Boulevard. With the addition of seven buses in the a.m., service would run every two minutes from Francis Lewis Boulevard. Buses would be added to allow service to run every three minutes in the evening. On December 11, 1988, in conjunction with the opening of the Archer Avenue Subway, the northern terminal of the Q4, Q4A, and the other Merrick Boulevard routes was moved to the Jamaica Center Bus Terminal. The same day, the Q4A was renumbered Q84. In January 1993, the Merrick Boulevard routes began traveling on Archer Avenue in both directions; previously, northbound buses traveled along Archer Avenue, while southbound buses traveled via Jamaica Avenue. In September 2003, limited service on the Q4, Q5, and Q85 was expanded during AM rush hours, beginning earlier in the morning. On January 14, 2004, limited-stop service began bypassing the Jamaica business district via Liberty Avenue and 160th Street. Reverse-peak limited-stop service was also added to the Q4 during morning hours.

=== 2010s to present ===
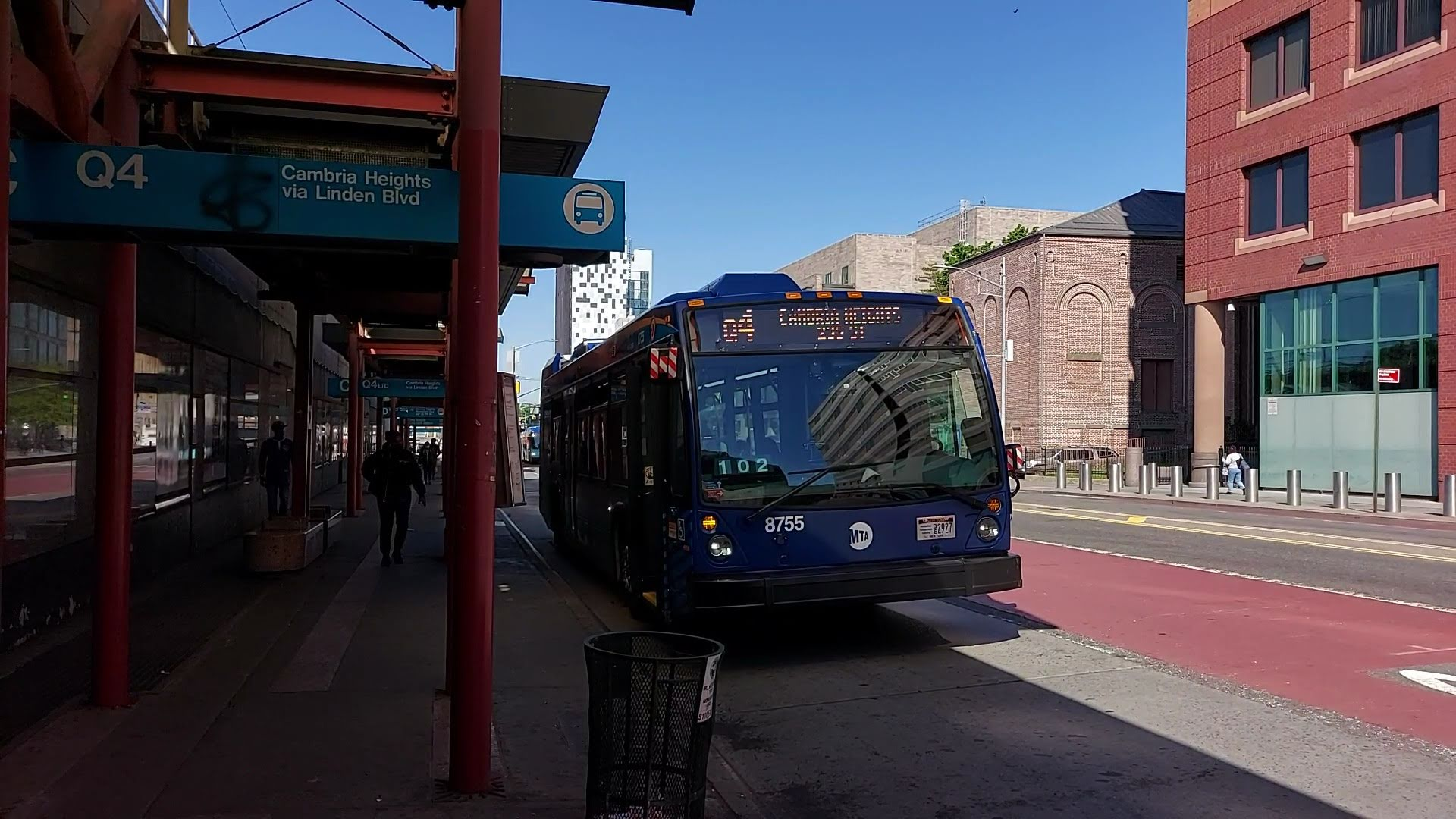
A 2020 Nova Bus LFS (8755) on the Q4 departing the Jamaica Center Bus Terminal for Cambria Heights.

In December 2019, the MTA released a draft redesign of the Queens bus network. As part of the redesign, the Q4 would have been replaced by a "subway connector" bus route, the QT40, with a nonstop section on Merrick Boulevard. The redesign was delayed due to the COVID-19 pandemic in New York City in 2020, and the original draft plan was dropped due to negative feedback. A revised plan was released in March 2022. As part of the new plan, the Q4 would mostly keep its existing route but will have a nonstop section on Merrick Boulevard, and the Q4 Limited would be discontinued. At its eastern end, the Q4 would be extended into Elmont, New York. A second route would run along Linden Boulevard as well called the Q51, a crosstown or Select Bus Service route that would run from Gateway Center Mall to the Q4's current eastern terminus, replacing and making the Q4 Limited stops east of Merrick Boulevard.

As part of a pilot program by the MTA to make five bus routes free (one in each borough), the Q4 was selected alongside the B60, Bx18, M116 and S46/96 to become fare-free in July 2023. The pilot program would last six to twelve months and buses would display a "Fare Free" sign, similar to the one used on the Q70. The pilot was only supposed to run from September 24, 2023 until March 30, 2024, but it was extended in March 2024 to run until further notice. Though ten U.S. Congress members requested in April 2024 that the state government provide additional funding for the fare-free pilot program, state lawmakers declined to reauthorize funding for the program. The fare-free program ended on August 31, 2024.

A final bus-redesign plan was released in December 2023. The Q4 would still become a zone route, with a nonstop section on Merrick Boulevard, but the route would not be extended into Elmont. The Q51 would also be created along Linden Boulevard but would be a limited-stop route with more stops than the original Q51 crosstown/Select Bus Service plan, and would terminate at the Rockaway Boulevard station instead of continuing to Gateway Center.

On December 17, 2024, addendums to the final plan were released. Among these, stop changes were made and the Q4 would retain its route to Jamaica via Merrick Boulevard and Archer Avenue, albeit without its limited-stop variant. On January 29, 2025, the current plan was approved by the MTA Board, and the Queens Bus Redesign went into effect in two different phases during Summer 2025. The Q4 and Q51 are part of Phase I, which started on June 29, 2025. As of this date, the Q51 extension to Gateway Center is still being considered for a separate implementation.

== See also ==
- Merrick Boulevard buses
