= New York and Long Island Traction Company =

Former New York City street railway company

New York & Long Island Traction Company
- A woman boarding New York & Long Island Traction Company Trolley no. 25 circa 1918.

Overview
- Owner: Long Island Rail Road(50%); Interborough Rapid Transit Company(50%)
- Locale: Queens, New York City; Nassau County, New York.

Service
- Type: Streetcar
- Operator: Long Island Rail Road(1902-1924)

History
- Opened: 1902
- Closed: 1926

Technical
- Track gauge: 4 ft 8 1/2 in (1,435 mm)
- Minimum radius: (?)

The New York and Long Island Traction Company was a street railway company in Queens and Nassau County, New York, United States. It was partially owned by a holding company for the Long Island Rail Road and partially by the Interborough Rapid Transit Company. The company operated from New York City east to Freeport, Hempstead, and Mineola.

== Lines ==
The railroad had two main lines.

=== Mineola Line ===
The Mineola Line (now the Nassau Inter-County Express n24 bus route) spanned from Queens Village to Mineola (in Nassau County) along Jamaica Avenue.

=== Brooklyn-Freeport Line ===
The Brooklyn-Freeport Line spanned from Brooklyn (at the former Grant Avenue station) to Freeport (also in Nassau County) and ran mostly along Rockaway Boulevard, North Conduit Avenue, Atlantic Avenue and Merrick Road. The 17-mile (27 km) route was mostly replaced by the Q7 and Q85 (operated by MTA Regional Bus Operations) and n4 (operated by Nassau Inter-County Express).

== See also ==
- Long Island Electric Railway
