= Green Acres Mall =

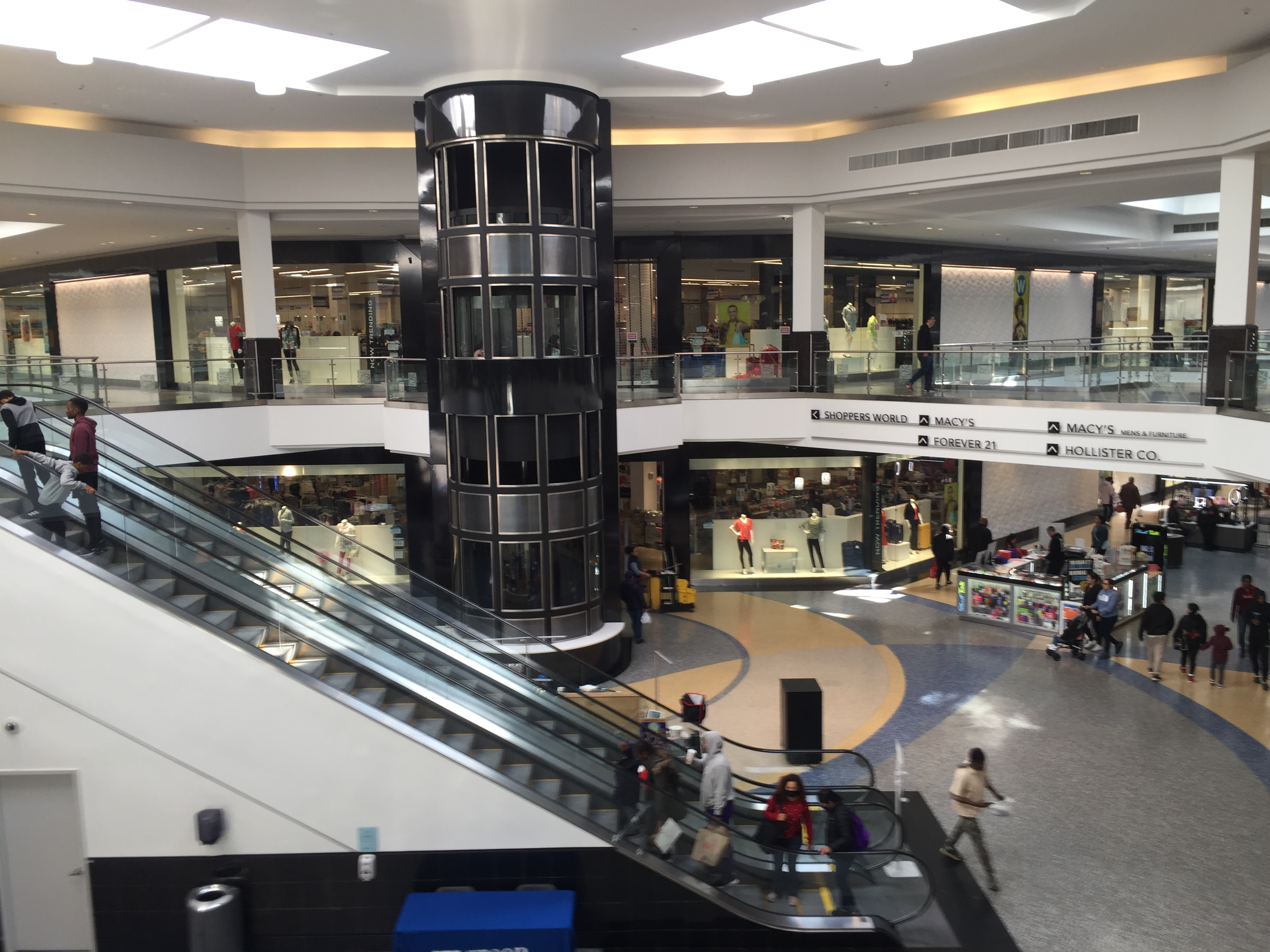
- The main atrium inside the mall in 2023
- Location: South Valley Stream, New York, U.S.
- Coordinates: 40.662°N 73.720°W
- Opened: 1956; 70 years ago
- Owner: The Macerich Company
- Num. of stores: 174
- Num. of anchor tenants: 6
- Floor area: 2,069,000 square feet (192,200 m^{2})
- Floors: 2 (3 in Macy's Men's and Furniture; 4 in main Macy's)
- Public transit: Nassau Inter-County Express: n1, Elmont Flexi Shuttle; New York City Bus: Q5, Q87, Q89
- Website: Green Acres Mall

Green Acres Mall is a shopping mall located within the hamlet of South Valley Stream, in Nassau County, New York, off Sunrise Highway near the Nassau County–New York City border and the Incorporated Village of Valley Stream.

As of 2026, the mall features two Macy's locations and a Primark as its anchor tenants. The mall also features many staples like Express, H&M, and Uniqlo. The mall has a gross leasable area (GLA) of 2,069,000 square feet (192,200 m^{2}). The mall is the 18th largest in the United States and is extremely popular in Nassau County and in the neighboring New York City borough of Queens. It is accessible by many Nassau Inter-County Express routes as well as three MTA New York City Bus routes, the Q5, Q87 and Q89, that cross the city border to the west of property.

== History ==
Green Acres Mall was built in 1956 on the northern portion of Curtiss Airfield and was one of Long Island's first open air malls. It was partially built on the former site of the Columbia Aircraft Corporation. During the mall's early years, WMCA 'Good Guys' would broadcast from the mall – as would WABC.

In 1968, the mall was enclosed, in order "to create an even more appealing shopping environment." At the time, there were three anchor stores: Lane's, JCPenney, and Gimbels. There were further renovations as well as an expansion in 1983 – including the addition of both the mall's second floor and a food court, along with the opening of Sears as a fourth anchor store.

To better compete with Roosevelt Field – Long Island's largest shopping mall, a multimillion-dollar food court renovation project was completed in 2006, and the renovation of the mall's ceilings and floors was completed in March 2007. Additionally, a Best Buy, PetSmart, and BJ's Wholesale Club all opened at the mall in early 2007.

The mall was owned and operated by Vornado Realty Trust until January 2013. It was announced in May 2012 that Vornado planned to sell the mall and some of its other retail centers, and in October 2012, it was announced that the mall was being sold to The Macerich Company in a deal that completed in the beginning of 2013. As of 2026, Macerich remains the owner and operator of the mall.

In 2024, it was announced that the mall would undergo a major renovation and expansion project. As part of the project, the former Sears space would be partially demolished and replaced with expanded retail, dining, and entertainment options and enhanced amenities.

== Anchor stores ==
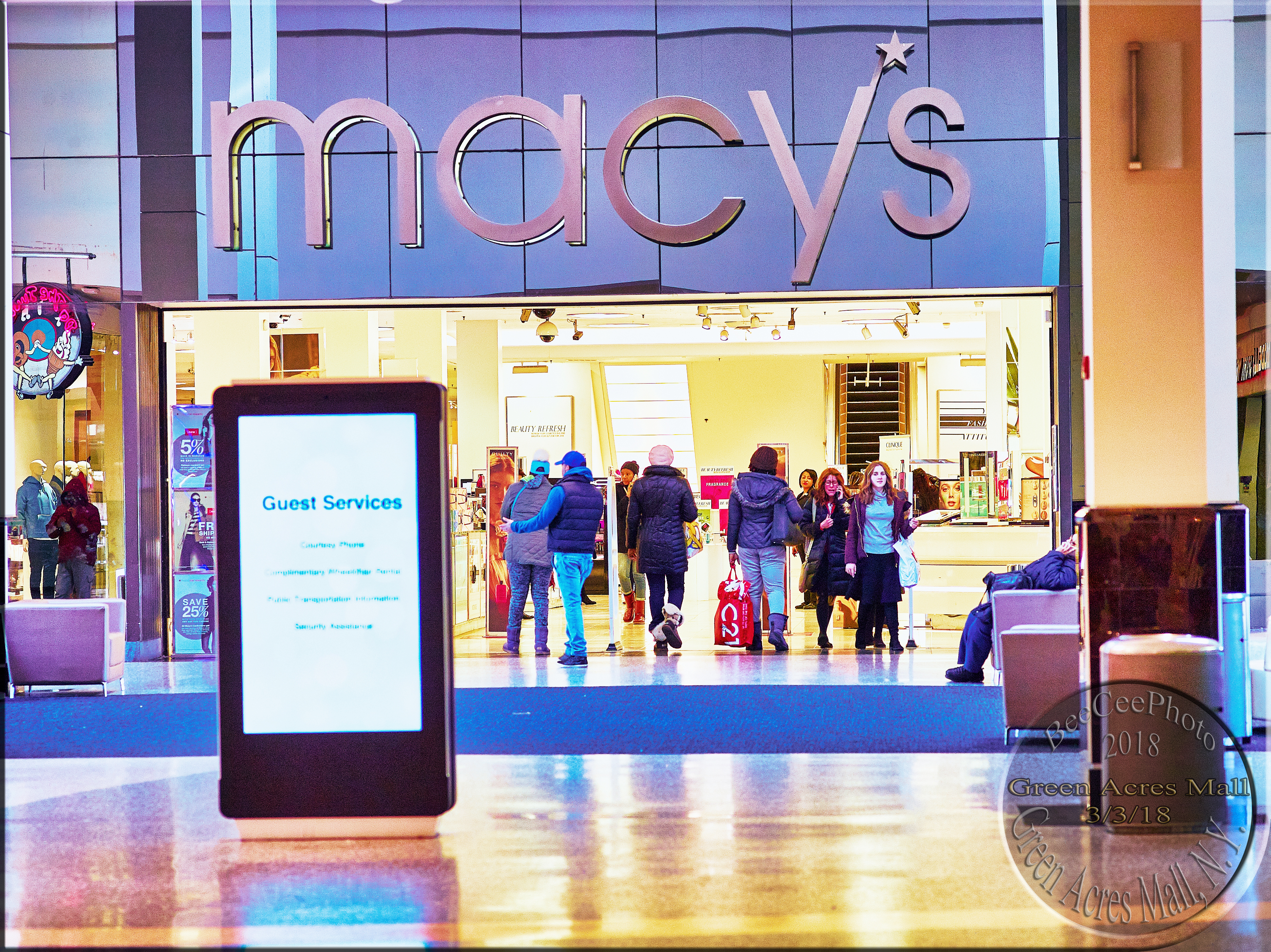
The entrance to Macy's inside the mall

As of 2026, the mall has three anchor stores: Macy's, Macy's Men's & Furniture Gallery, and Primark.

=== Former anchors ===
- Gimbels (218,700 square feet (20,320 m^{2}))- Opened in 1956 with the mall and closed in 1987. It was replaced by Abraham & Straus in 1986 and then Macy's in 1995.
- Lane's (216,400 square feet (20,100 m^{2}))- Opened in 1960 and closed in 1965. It was first replaced by Love's in 1966, which was then converted to S. Klein in 1968. Korvettes took over the space in 1975. Then Gertz took over in 1982 and was rebranded as Stern’s a year later. After Federated Department Stores retired the Stern’s nameplate in 2001, the space was subdivided between a Macy's Men's & Furniture Gallery and Kohls. Kohls closed in 2019 and its space is still vacant as of 2026 with redevelopment plans in the works.
- JCPenney (113,160 square feet (10,513 m^{2}))- Opened in 1957 and closed in 2020 after nearly 63 years of operation. In 1982 the store was expanded into the basement doubling its size from 53,400 square feet (4,960 m^{2}). After it closed, the ground floor was subdivided between Uniqlo and Primark, which opened in 2023.
- Century 21 (72,300 square feet (6,720 m^{2}))- Opened in 2015 in a space made up of 18 former interior stores.[4][5] It closed in 2021 when the chain went out of business and became a Shoppers World for a short period until 2024. It was then turned back into interior mall space with Foot Locker taking up the largest section on the first level. As of 2026, the whole upper level remains vacant.
- J. J. Newberry (52,000 square feet (4,800 m^{2}))- Opened in 1957 and closed by the 1980s. It was turned into additional mall space after closing.
- Sears (150,000 square feet (14,000 m^{2}))- Opened in 1983 and closed in 2021. As of 2026, it is being demolished along with the adjacent parking garage and auto center for new green spaces, dining, and an 80,000 sqft ShopRite scheduled to open in 2027.
- Alexander’s (320,000 square feet (30,000 m^{2}))- Opened in 1967 and closed in 1992 when the chain went bankrupt. The store sat on the mall property close to Sunrise Hwy but was not connected to the mall itself. After closing it was demolished and a Caldor was built on the site in 1994, which would later become Target in 1999.

== Green Acres Commons ==
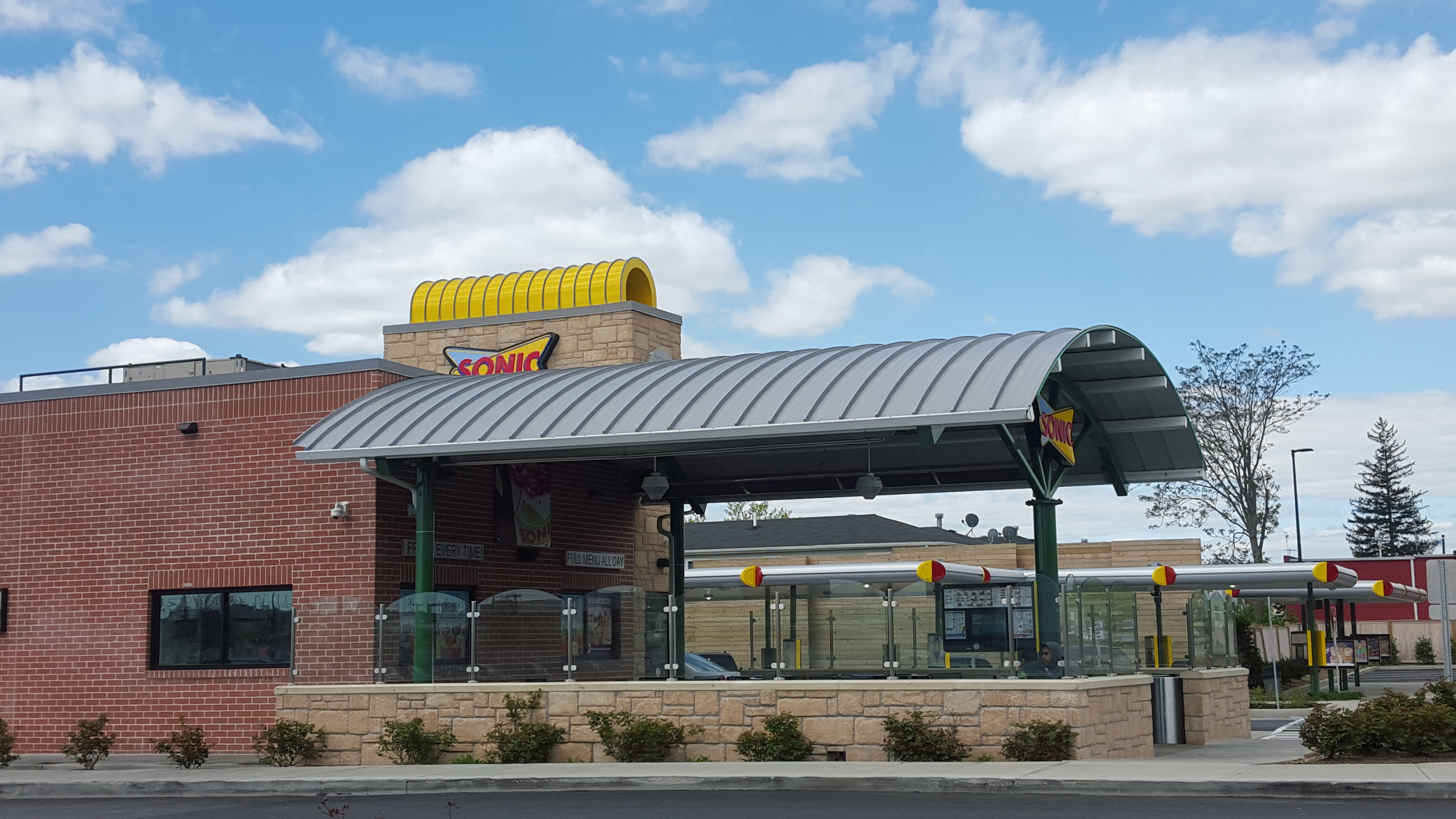
Canopy outside entrance to Sonic Green Acres Commons

In 2015, the Sunrise Cinemas complex at 750 Sunrise Highway was acquired by RIPCO NY – a real estate management company, which completed a 366,000-square-foot (34,000 m^{2}) open-air expansion project at the mall for The Macerich Company, with new shops and standalone eateries; this expansion is known as Green Acres Commons. This part of the complex opened in October 2016, with a BJ's Brewhouse, Buffalo Wild Wings, Ulta, 24-Hour Fitness, DXL, Five Below, Dick's Sporting Goods, HomeGoods, Sonic Drive-In, Ashley HomeStore, Burlington, followed by the addition of a Capital One Bank in 2017 and an AT&T in 2019. The existing Bronx BBQ – an 8,000-square-foot (740 m^{2}) eatery on the northwest corner – remained. To the south are a Walmart and a Home Depot.

There have been lawsuits to roll-back a $4.5 million tax increase affecting the three-town area surrounding Green Acres Mall. The Town of Hempstead Industrial Development Agency provided a tax incentive to Green Acres Mall that would reduce the 2016 liability by that amount, resulting in increases that residents met with protests. The 15-year deal hinged on the promise of added security, renovations to the mall complex, and new higher-end stores which resulted in the commons.

== Public transportation ==
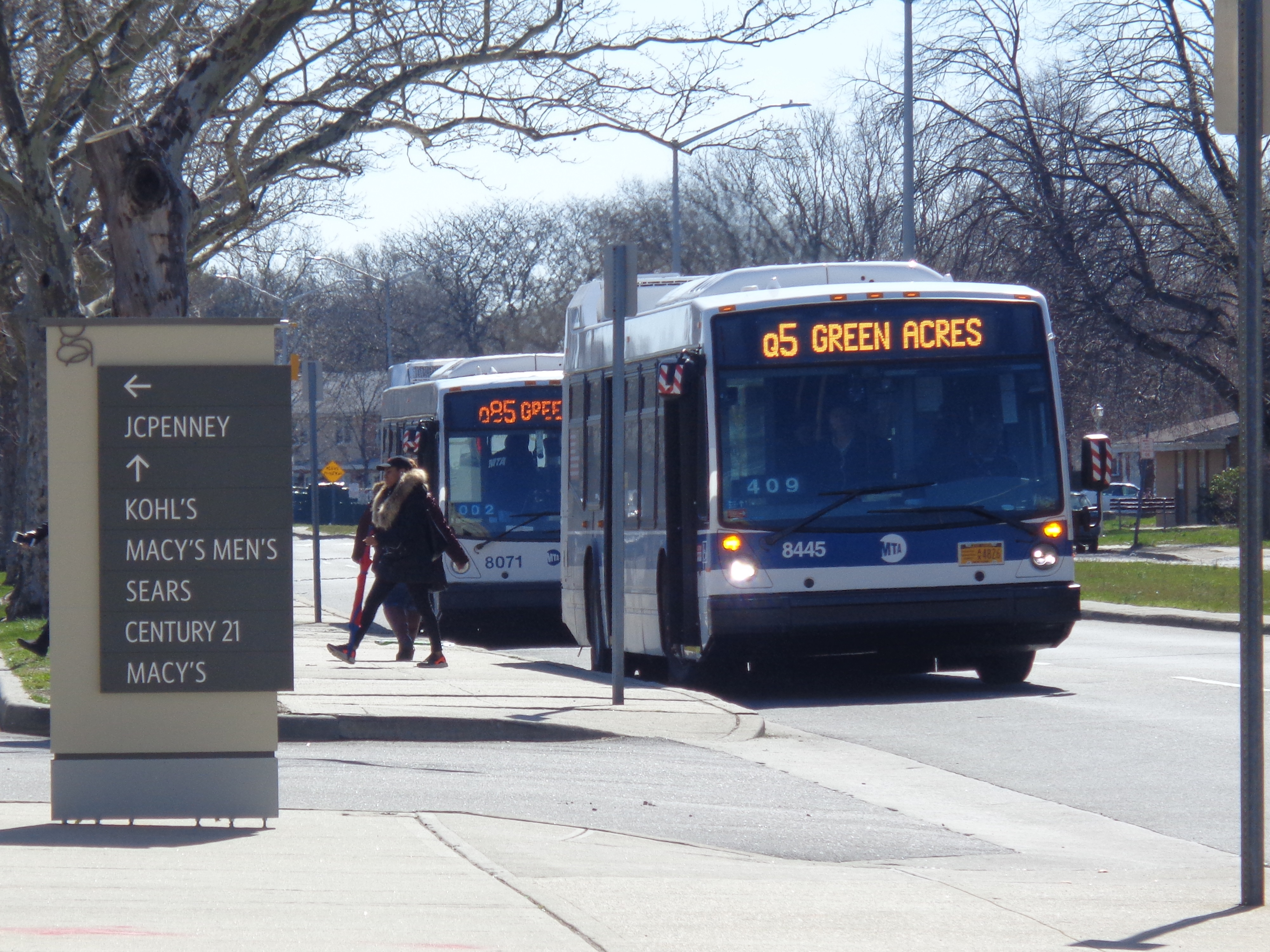
NYCTA buses at the mall in 2016

Green Acres Mall is served by two Nassau Inter-County Express (NICE) bus routes: the n1 and the Elmont Flexi Shuttle. In addition, the Q5 (weekends only), Q87, and Q89 bus routes of the New York City Transit Authority (NYCTA) serve the mall. The bus terminal is located at the south end of the mall, at Ring Road South.

== Incidents ==
Series of incidents that have happened at Green Acres Mall

- 1968: Richard Cottingham, also known as the "Torso Killer", murders 23-year-old Diane Cusick
- September 1, 2019: Ammonia and bleach mixed in a pump sump
- March 7, 2022: Worker shot in the leg by gunman in the famous footwear kiosk
- October 23, 2023: Mall on lock down after shoplifting suspect supposedly fired a gun

== See also ==
- Roosevelt Field
- Sunrise Mall (Massapequa Park, New York)
- Broadway Commons
- Americana Manhasset
