= St. Albans, Queens =

Neighborhood in New York City

St. Albans
- Neighborhood of Queens
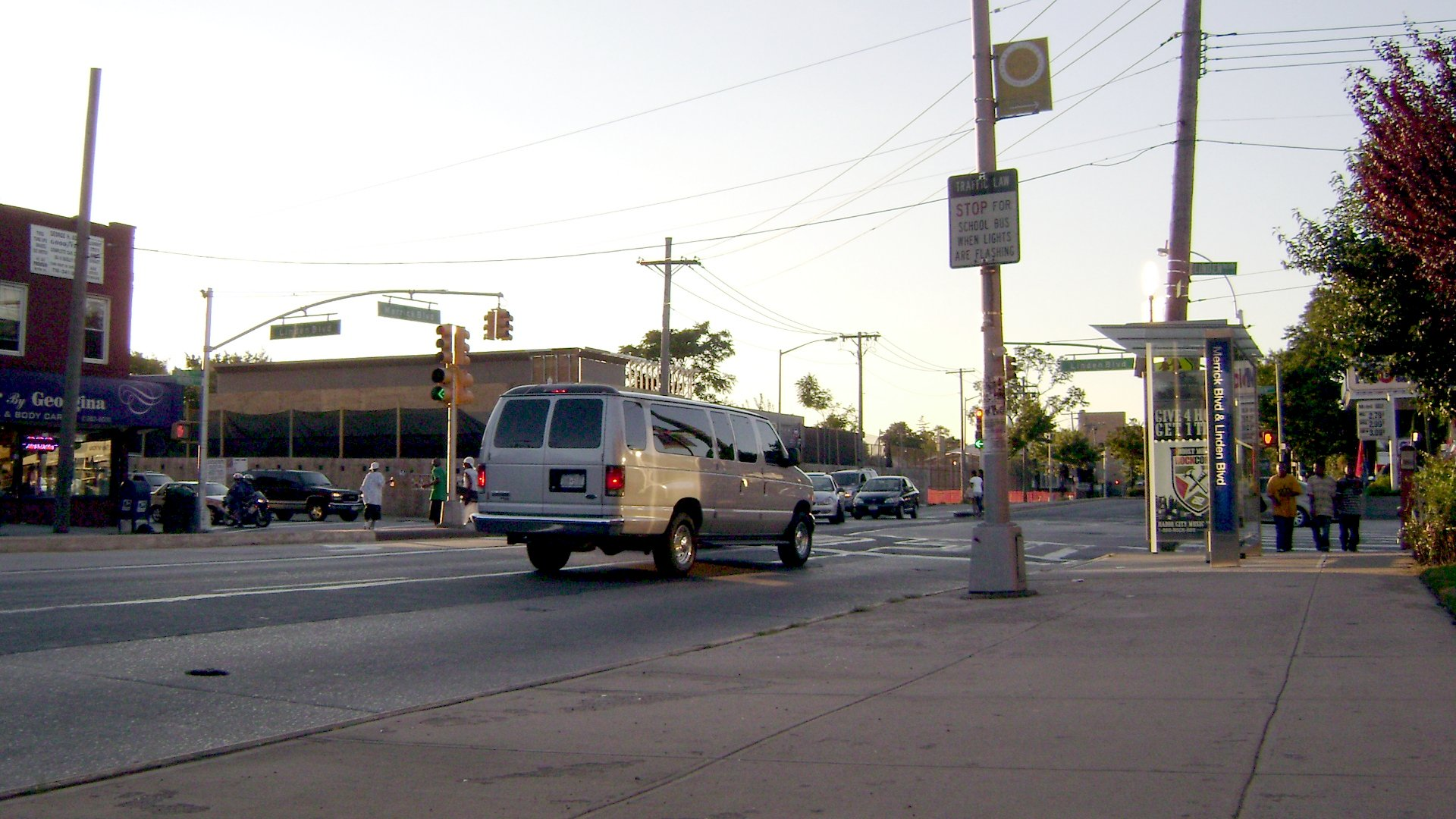
- Merrick Boulevard in St. Albans, 2007
- Location within New York City
- Coordinates: 40.69°N 73.765°W
- Country: United States
- State: New York
- City: New York City
- County/Borough: Queens
- Community District: Queens 12
- Named for: St Albans, Hertfordshire, England

Population (2010)
  - Total: 48,593

Ethnicity
  - Black: 88.6%
  - Hispanic: 6.5
  - Two or more: 2.2
  - White: 1.0
  - Other: 1.7

Economics
- Time zone: UTC−5 (EST)
  - Summer (DST): UTC−4 (EDT)
- ZIP Code: 11412
- Area codes: 718, 347, 929, and 917

St. Albans is a residential neighborhood in the southeastern portion of the New York City borough of Queens. It is bordered by Jamaica to the northwest, Hollis to the north, Queens Village to the northeast, Cambria Heights to the east, Laurelton to the southeast, Springfield Gardens to the south, and South Jamaica to the southwest. St. Albans is centered on the intersection of Linden Boulevard and Farmers Boulevard, about two miles north of John F. Kennedy International Airport.

The small western enclave of Addisleigh Park is a U.S. historic district where many notable African Americans have lived, including Jackie Robinson, W. E. B. Du Bois, Lena Horne, and many jazz musicians such as Fats Waller, Ella Fitzgerald and Count Basie.

St. Albans is located in Queens Community District 12 and its ZIP Code is 11412. It is patrolled by the New York City Police Department's 113th Precinct. Politically, St. Albans is represented by the New York City Council's 27th and 28th Districts.

== History ==
=== Early settlement ===
Part of a land grant to Dutch settlers from New Netherland Governor Peter Stuyvesant in 1655, the area, like much of Queens, remained farmland and forest for most of the next two centuries.

By the 1800s, the lands of four families—the Remsens, Everitts, Ludlums, and Hendricksons—formed the nucleus of this sprawling farm community in the eastern portion of the Town of Jamaica. In 1814, when the Village of Jamaica (the first village on Long Island) was incorporated, its (the village's) boundaries extended eastward to Freeman's Path (now Farmers Boulevard), and south to Lazy Lane (called Central Avenue in 1900, then Foch Boulevard in the 1920s, (Note: The name Foch was chosen to honor Marshal Ferdinand Foch, following World War I. While most of Foch Boulevard still exists, the alignment east of Farmers Boulevard is now part of Linden Boulevard.) thus including parts of present-day St. Albans. In 1852, the old mill pond that is now at the center of Baisley Pond Park was acquired by the Brooklyn waterworks for use as a reservoir.

=== Later development ===
In 1872, the Long Island Rail Road's Cedarhurst Cut-off was built through the area, but no stop appears on the first timetables. In 1892, an area called Francis Farm was surveyed and developed for housing. There were numerous Francis families farming in the eastern portion of the Town of Jamaica in the 1880s. Francis Lewis Boulevard (named for a signer of the Declaration of Independence, from Queens), which does not yet appear on maps from 1909, nor in 1910, is now the eastern boundary of St. Albans.

Soon, the first street lights illuminated the crossroads that is now Linden Boulevard and Farmers Boulevard. New shops clustered around August Everitt's lone store. By July 1, 1898, the St. Albans Long Island Rail Road station opened where the tracks crossed Locust Avenue (now Baisley Boulevard). The station was razed and replaced with the current, grade separated station on October 15, 1935.

In 1899, a year after Queens became part of New York City (and with the Town of Jamaica and the Village of Jamaica thereby dissolved), the new post office for the 600 residents was named St. Albans, after St Albans in Hertfordshire, England, which itself was named after a Saint Alban, thought to be the first Christian martyred in England. The name had been in use for the area since at least 1894 for the name of the school district, and the LIRR station was named St. Albans when it opened in 1898. A 1909 map also shows a St Albans Avenue and a St Albans Place in the area.

The site was originally occupied by the St. Albans Golf Course and Country Club, which was completed in 1915. The club brought rich and famous golfers, including baseball star Babe Ruth, and hosted the 1930 Metropolitan Amateur. The Depression forced the golf course owners to try to sell, but plans for private development fell through. The land was seized by the federal government in 1942, and construction soon began on the St. Albans Naval Hospital, which opened in 1943. After construction was completed in 1950, the hospital had 3000 beds and contained a network of 76 wards. The hospital was turned over to the Veterans Administration in 1974, reopening as a VA hospital two years later, and more recently evolved into the Veterans Administration St. Albans Primary and Extended Care Facility. A portion of the hospital site became Roy Wilkins Park in the 1980s.

==== Addisleigh Park subsection ====
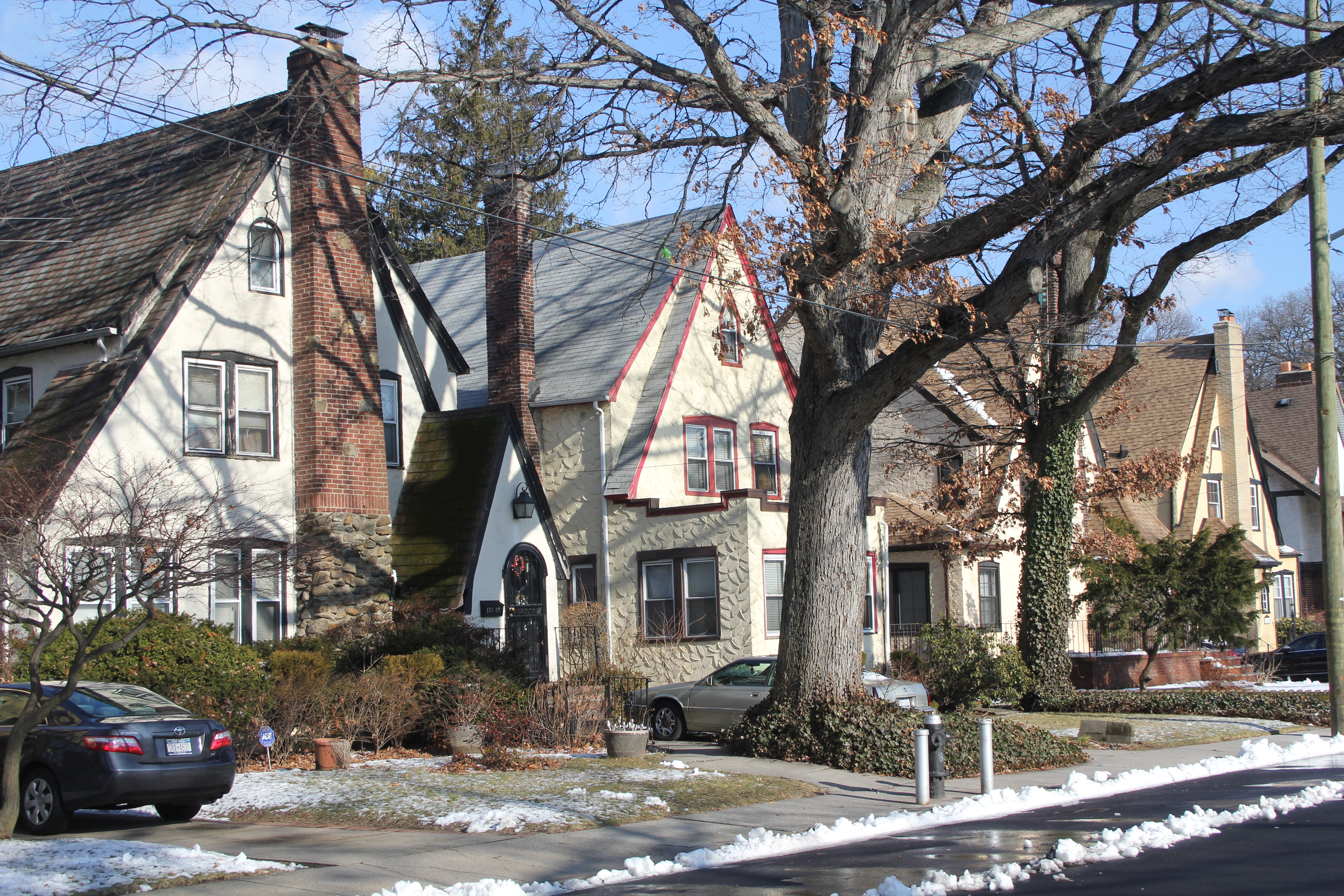
Houses in Addisleigh Park

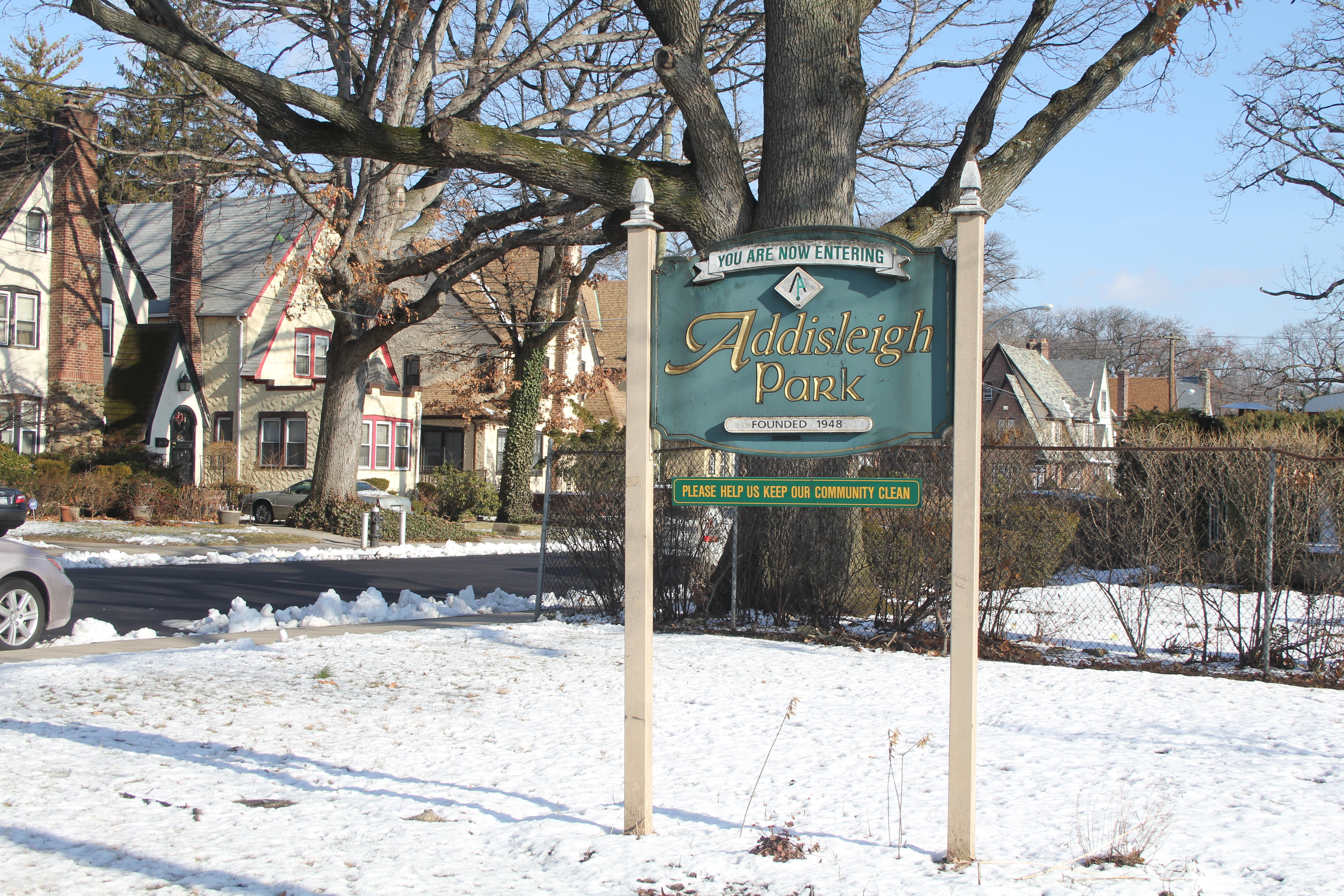
Welcome sign

Within St. Albans is the small western enclave of Addisleigh Park, a U.S. historic district that consists of single-family homes built in a variety of styles between the 1910s and 1930s. Though originally intended as a segregated community for white people only, from the late 1930s many notable African Americans have lived there. Today, it remains a predominantly African American and Jamaican enclave that is more upscale than surrounding areas in southeast Queens.

Between 1900 and 1940, the village of Addisleigh Park was developed by a handful of eminent white entrepreneurs including Edwin H. Brown, Gerald C. English, and Alexander Rodman. Restrictive covenants were established to prohibit the sale of any of its properties to blacks. A 1926 New York Times article insists, "Addisleigh, together with the St. Albans Golf Club, was laid out under the personal direction of Edwin H. Brown, and carries a land and house restriction of the highest type." Two lawsuits were filed successfully by white residents who accused their neighbors of breaking the contractual segregation imposed on the neighborhood by its developers. Simeon Bankoff, executive director of the New York Historic Districts Council, says about this backlash, "It was unpleasant, as it was a case of a number of narrow-minded neighbors trying to fight what they saw as an invasion of unwanted people in their area." Affluent white New York City-based public figures moved into Addisleigh Park to experience the privacy of suburban seclusion. Addisleigh Park boasted well-kept rows of Tudor and Colonial homes. The neighborhood's close proximity to Manhattan allowed for quick and frequent commuting. During the Swing Era, Manhattan's 52nd Street served as the epicenter of Swing Era live entertainment and musical innovation. For this reason, many successful African American jazz musicians began to recognize Addisleigh Park as the newest suburban haven for wealthy, influential artists.

In 1948, in Shelley v. Kraemer, the United States Supreme Court ruled that racially restrictive covenants violated the equal-protection clause of the 14th Amendment, though by that year, Addisleigh Park had already become a haven for world-famous African Americans in jazz and sports. The neighborhood was declared a historic district by the NYC Landmarks Preservation Commission in 2011.

== Demographics ==
Based on data from the 2010 United States census, the population of St. Albans was 48,593, a change of −1,453 (−3%) from the 50,046 counted in 2000. Covering an area of 1,778.68 acres (719.81 ha), the neighborhood had a population density of 27.3 inhabitants per acre (17,500/sq mi; 6,700/km^{2}).

The racial makeup of the neighborhood was 1% (469) White, 88.6% (43,073) African American, 0.3% (129) Native American, 0.9% (417) Asian, 0% (16) Pacific Islander, 0.5% (258) from other races, and 2.2% (1,085) from two or more races. Hispanic or Latino of any race were 6.5% (3,146) of the population.

The entirety of Community Board 12, which mainly comprises Jamaica but also includes St. Albans and Hollis, had 232,911 inhabitants as of NYC Health's 2018 Community Health Profile, with an average life expectancy of 80.5 years. This is slightly lower than the median life expectancy of 81.2 for all New York City neighborhoods. Most inhabitants are youth and middle-aged adults: 22% are between the ages of between 0–17, 27% between 25 and 44, and 27% between 45 and 64. The ratio of college-aged and elderly residents was lower, at 10% and 14% respectively.

As of 2017, the median household income in Community Board 12 was $61,670. In 2018, an estimated 20% of St. Albans and Jamaica residents lived in poverty, compared to 19% in all of Queens and 20% in all of New York City. One in eight residents (12%) were unemployed, compared to 8% in Queens and 9% in New York City. Rent burden, or the percentage of residents who have difficulty paying their rent, is 56% in St. Albans and Jamaica, higher than the boroughwide and citywide rates of 53% and 51% respectively. Based on this calculation, as of 2018, St. Albans and Jamaica are considered to be high-income relative to the rest of the city and not gentrifying.

== Housing ==
St. Albans housing consists mostly of detached, one and two-family homes. Linden Boulevard is the major shopping street. In 2011 The New York Times reported that many foreclosures were occurring and there was a high level of unemployment. At that time, many black people were moving from St. Albans to the Southern United States.

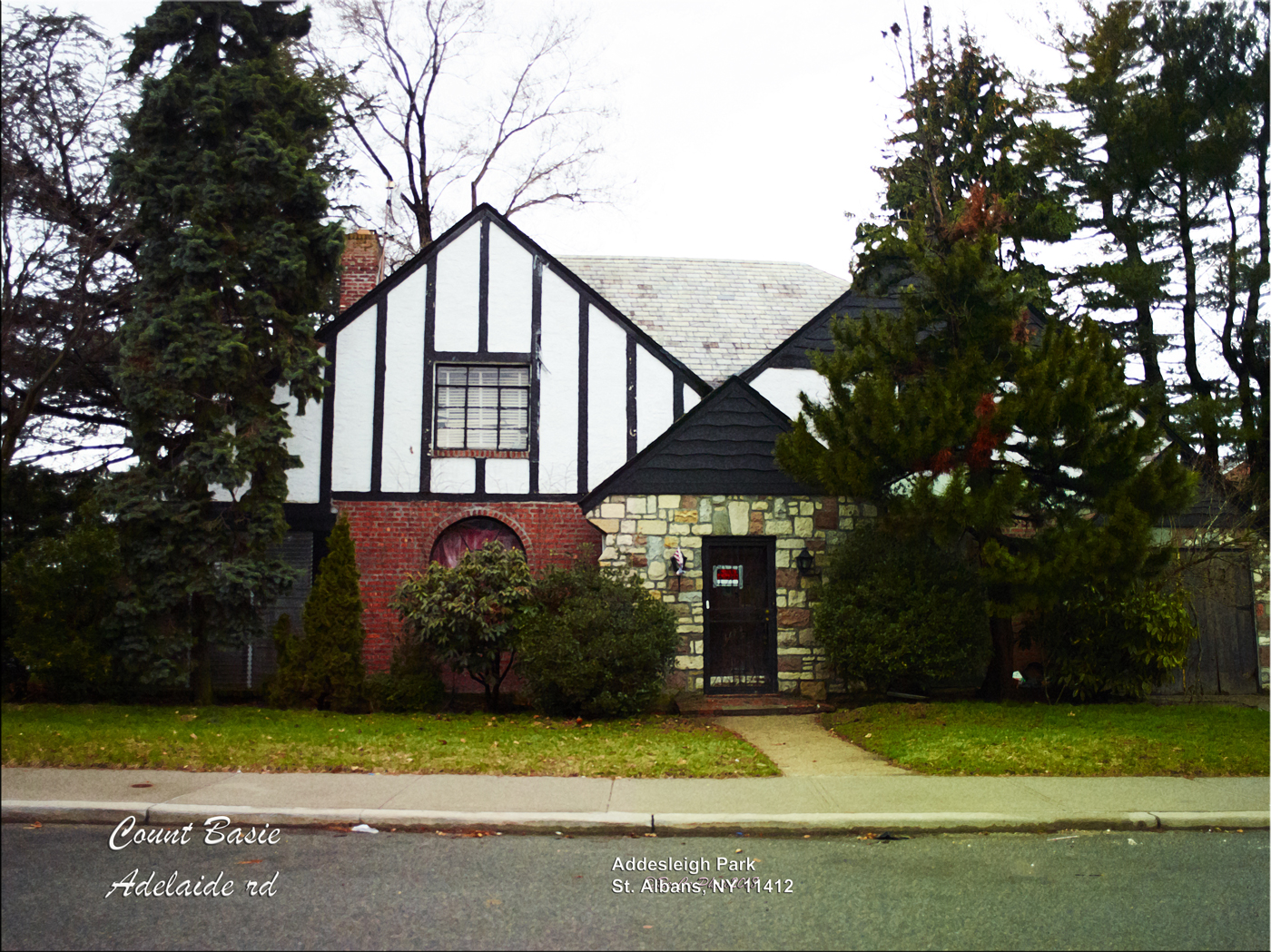

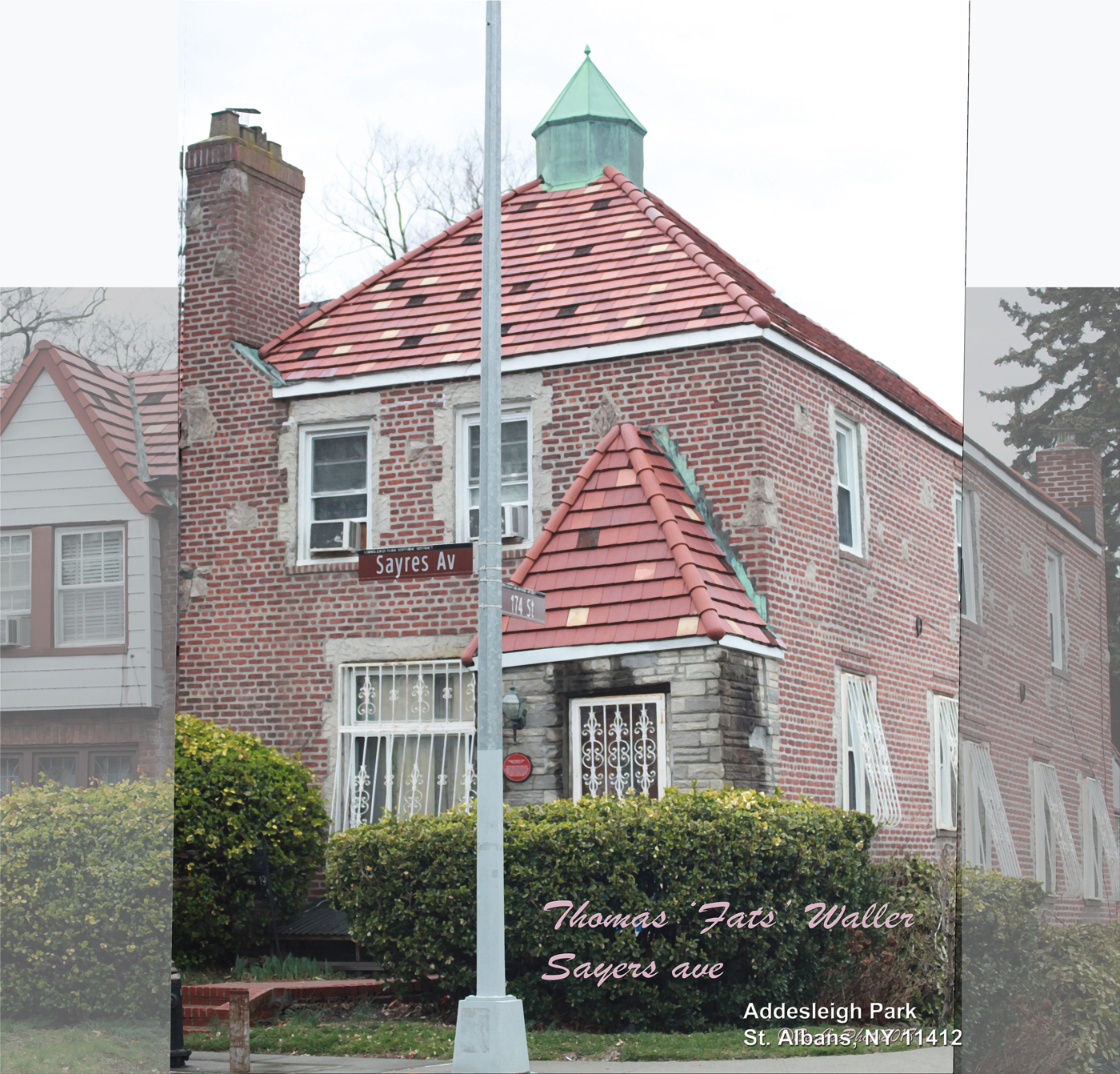

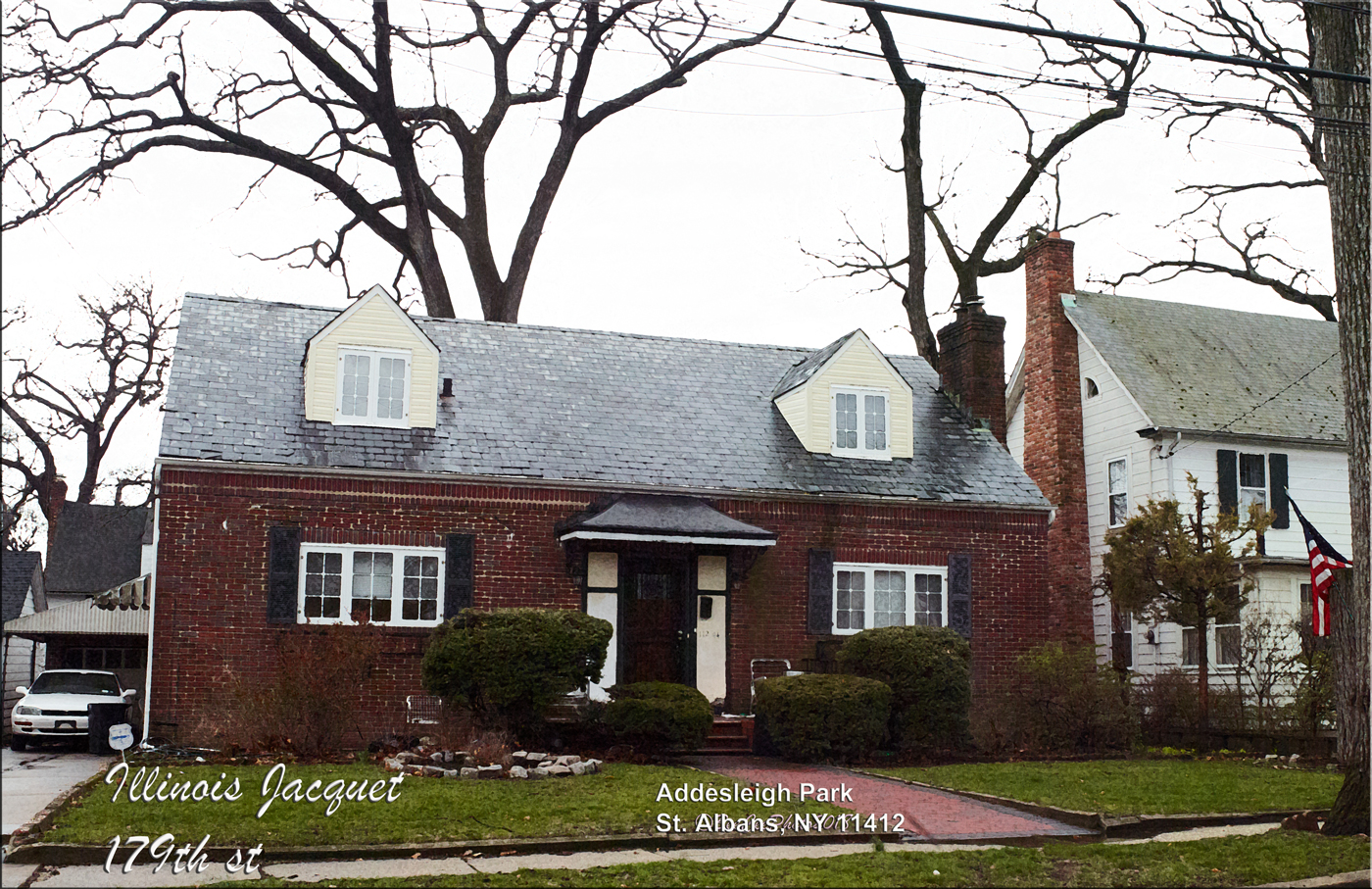

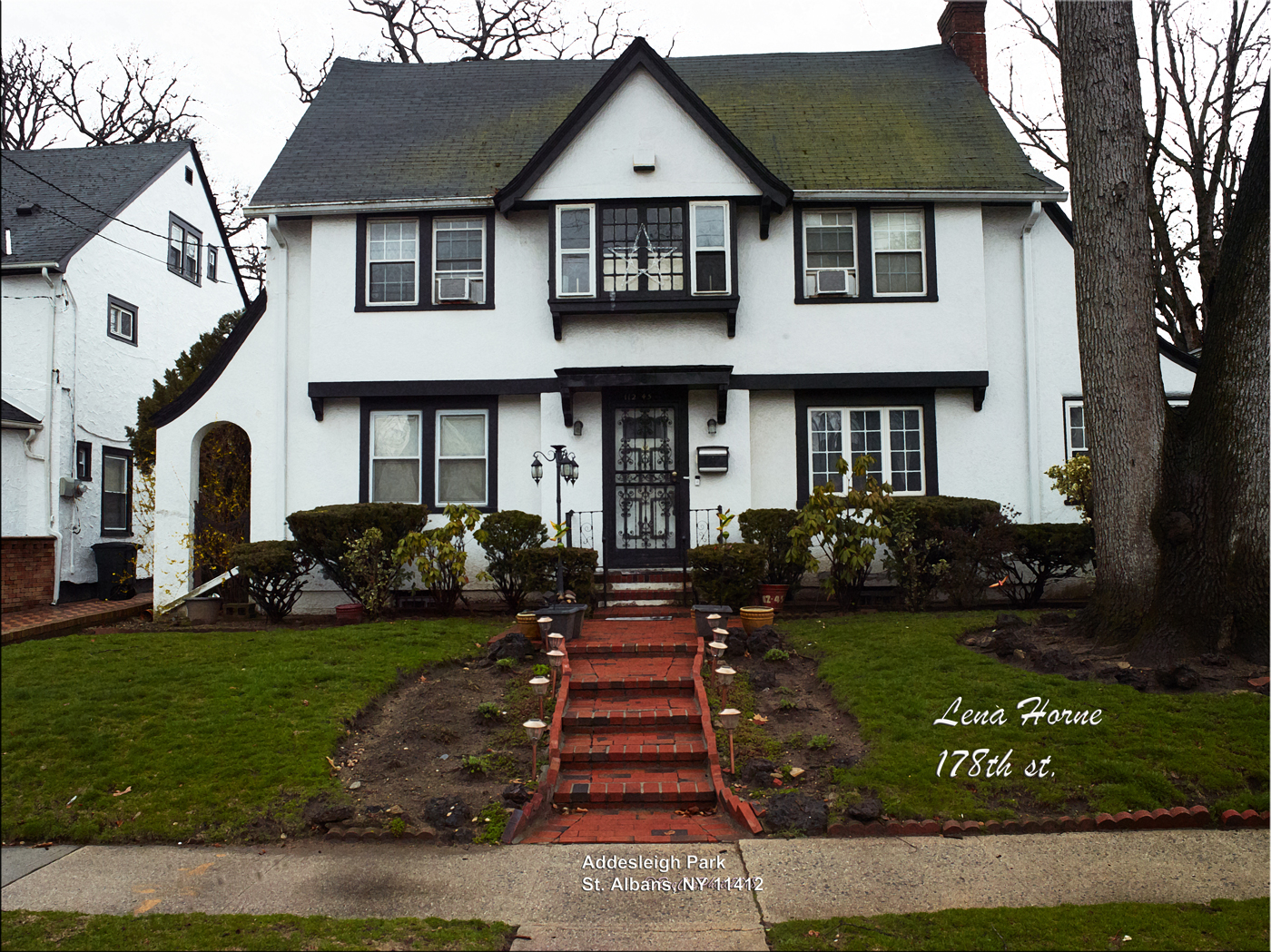

== Police and crime ==
South Jamaica and St. Albans are patrolled by the NYPD's 113th Precinct, located at 167-02 Baisley Boulevard. The 113th Precinct ranked 55th safest out of 69 patrol areas for per-capita crime in 2010. But the precinct crime rate is much lower than in 1990, all categories having decreased by 86.1% between 1990 and 2018. The precinct reported 5 murders, 28 rapes, 156 robberies, 383 felony assaults, 153 burglaries, 414 grand larcenies, and 138 grand larcenies auto in 2018.

== Fire safety ==
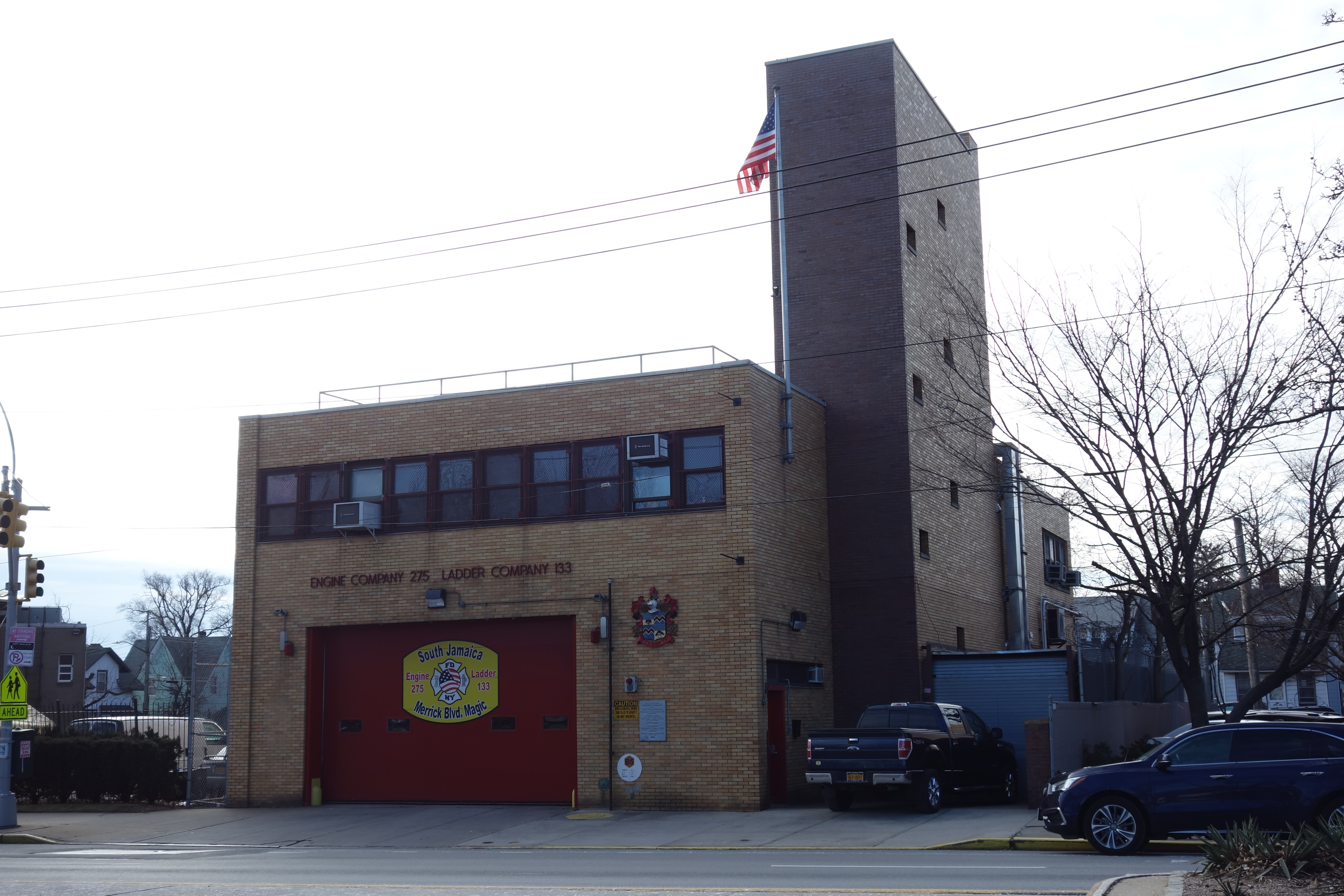
Engine Company 275/Ladder Company 133

St. Albans is served by two New York City Fire Department (FDNY) fire stations:

- Engine Company 275/Ladder Company 133 – 111-36 Merrick Boulevard
- Engine Company 317/Ladder Company 165/Battalion 54, at 117-11 196th Street.

== Health ==
As of 2018, preterm births and births to teenage mothers are more common in St. Albans and Jamaica than in other places citywide. In St. Albans and Jamaica, there were 10 preterm births per 1,000 live births (compared to 87 per 1,000 citywide), and 21.4 births to teenage mothers per 1,000 live births (compared to 19.3 per 1,000 citywide). St. Albans and Jamaica have a low population of residents who are uninsured. In 2018, this population of uninsured residents was estimated to be 5%, lower than the citywide rate of 12%.

The concentration of fine particulate matter, the deadliest type of air pollutant, in St. Albans and Jamaica is 0.007 milligrams per cubic metre (7.0×10^{−9} oz/ft^{3}), less than the city average. Eight percent of St. Albans and Jamaica residents are smokers, which is lower than the city average of 14% of residents being smokers. In St. Albans and Jamaica, 30% of residents are obese, 16% are diabetic, and 37% have high blood pressure—compared to the citywide averages of 22%, 8%, and 23% respectively. In addition, 23% of children are obese, compared to the citywide average of 20%.

Eighty-six percent of residents eat some fruits and vegetables every day, which is slightly less than the city's average of 87%. In 2018, 82% of residents described their health as "good", "very good", or "excellent", higher than the city's average of 78%. For every supermarket in St. Albans and Jamaica, there are 20 bodegas.

The nearest major hospitals are Jamaica Hospital and Queens Hospital Center, both located in Jamaica.

== Post offices and ZIP Code ==
St. Albans is covered by the ZIP Code 11412. The United States Post Office operates two post offices nearby: the Saint Albans Station at 195-04 Linden Boulevard and the Rochdale Village Station at 165-100 Baisley Boulevard.

== Parks and recreation ==
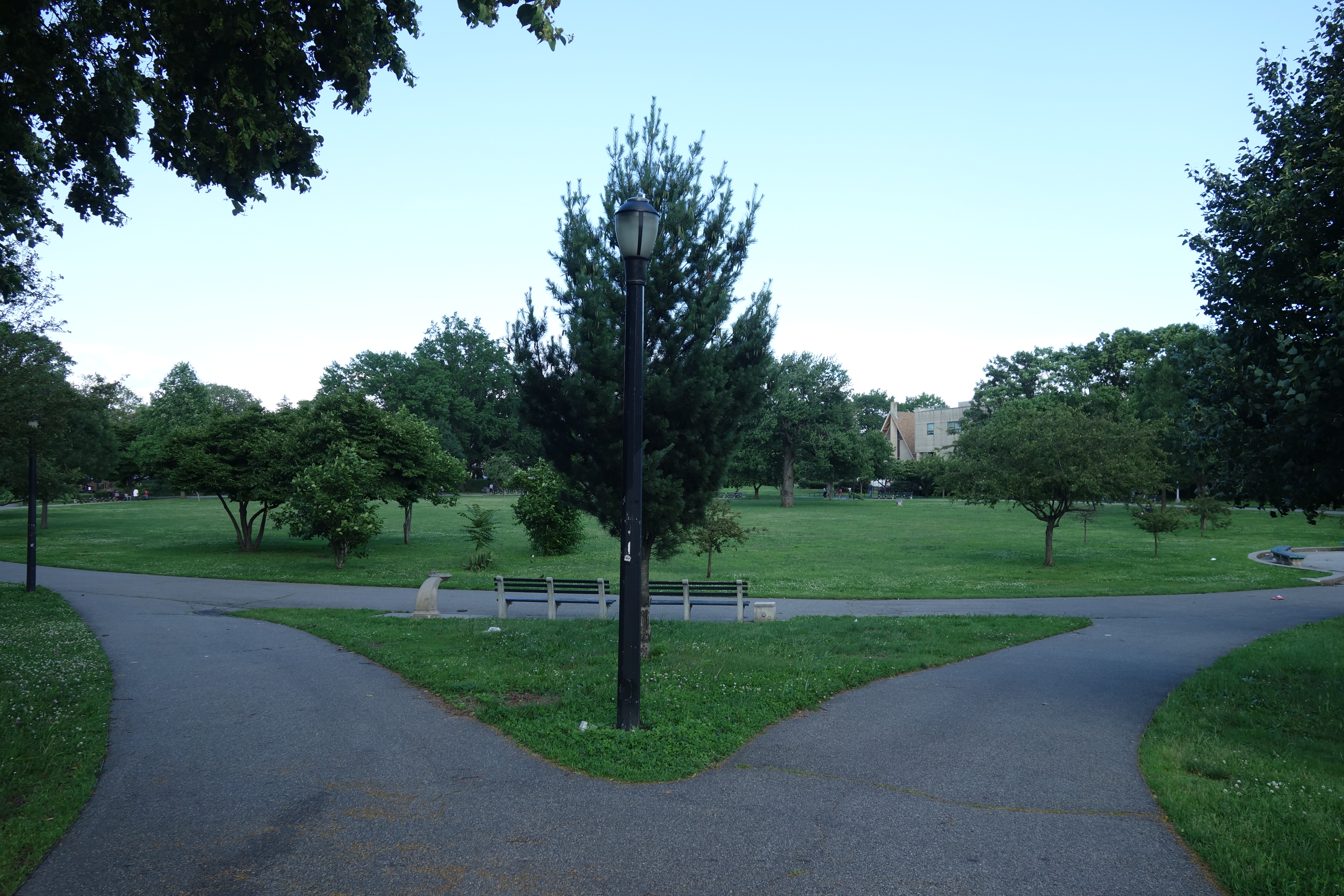
St. Albans Park

There are several public parks in St. Albans, operated by the New York City Department of Parks and Recreation.

St. Albans Park is bounded by Merrick Boulevard, Sayres Avenue, and Marne Place. It includes facilities for cricket, handball, and tennis, as well as fitness equipment, playground, and spray showers. The land was acquired by the city for use as a park in 1914, and it was slightly expanded in 1968.

Roy Wilkins Park is located between 115th Avenue and Merrick and Baisley Boulevards. It contains facilities for baseball, basketball, cricket, handball, swimming, tennis, and track-and-field, as well as a recreation center, fitness equipment, playground, and spray showers. The land, formerly a naval hospital, was given to the city in 1977. It is named for civil rights activist Roy Wilkins.

Railroad Park, a nature area, is located on a triangular plot bounded by 129th Avenue, 176th Street, and the Long Island Rail Road's Atlantic Branch. The land for this park was acquired in 1962–1963.

Daniel M. O'Connell Playground is located between Murdock Avenue, 112th Road, and 197th and 198th Street. It contains basketball and handball courts, fitness equipment, a play area, and spray showers. The playground is named for World War I veteran Daniel M. O'Connell.

Liberty Rock is a boulder in Liberty Triangle park at the intersection of Farmers Blvd. and Liberty Ave.

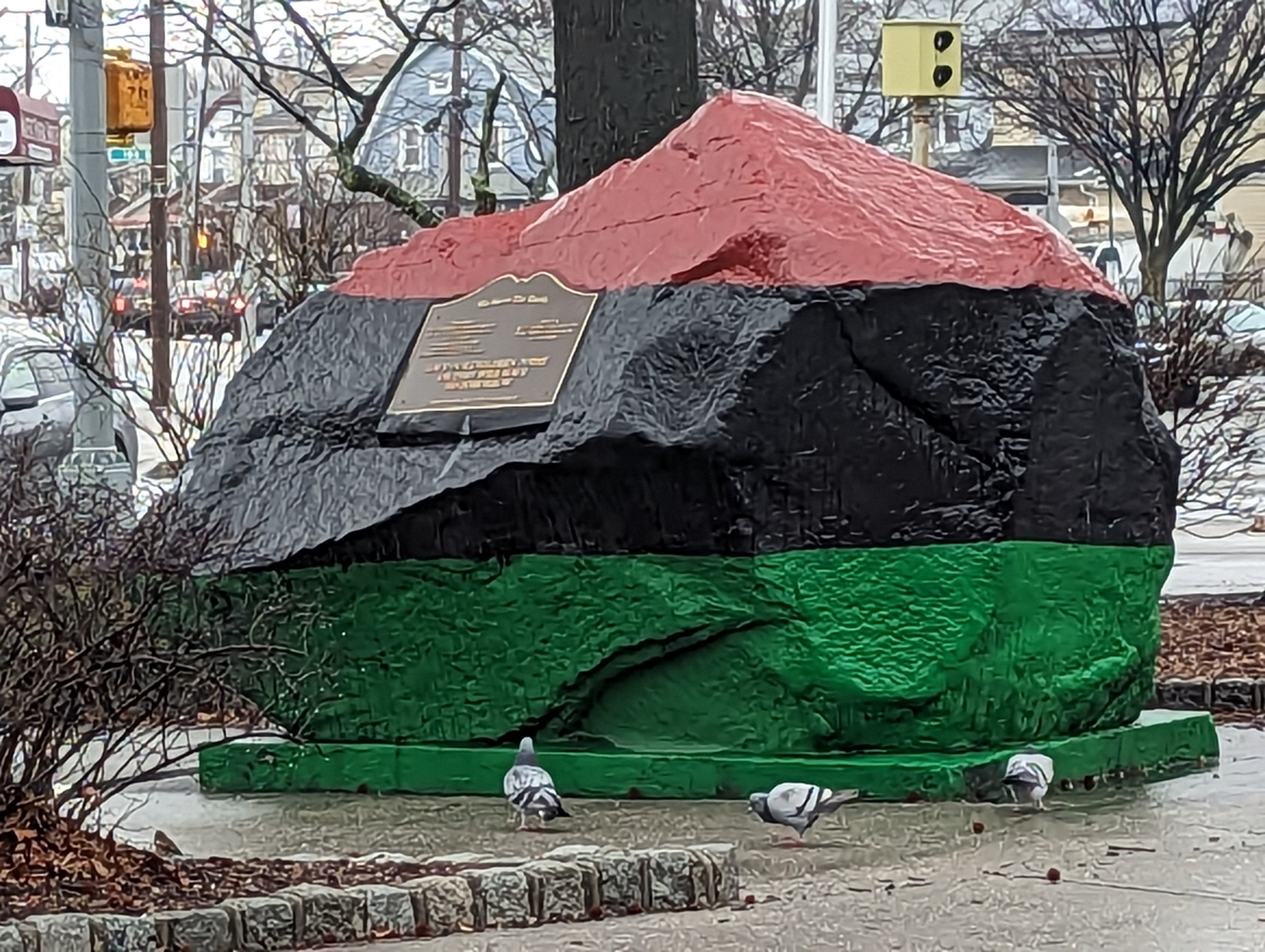
Liberty Rock, Hollis–St. Albans, Queens, NYC

The Liberty Rock is a symbol of the history and culture of the African American community in St. Albans. The painting of the rock in red, black, and green, the colors of the Pan-African flag, represents the community's commitment to civil rights, group identity, and fostering ties between all people of African descent. The location of the rock, at the intersection of St. Albans and Hollis neighborhoods in Jamaica, highlights its significance as a shared symbol for the entire community. The Liberty Rock serves as a symbol of resistance and resilience, reminding the community of its rich cultural heritage and ongoing struggle for equality and justice.

== Education ==
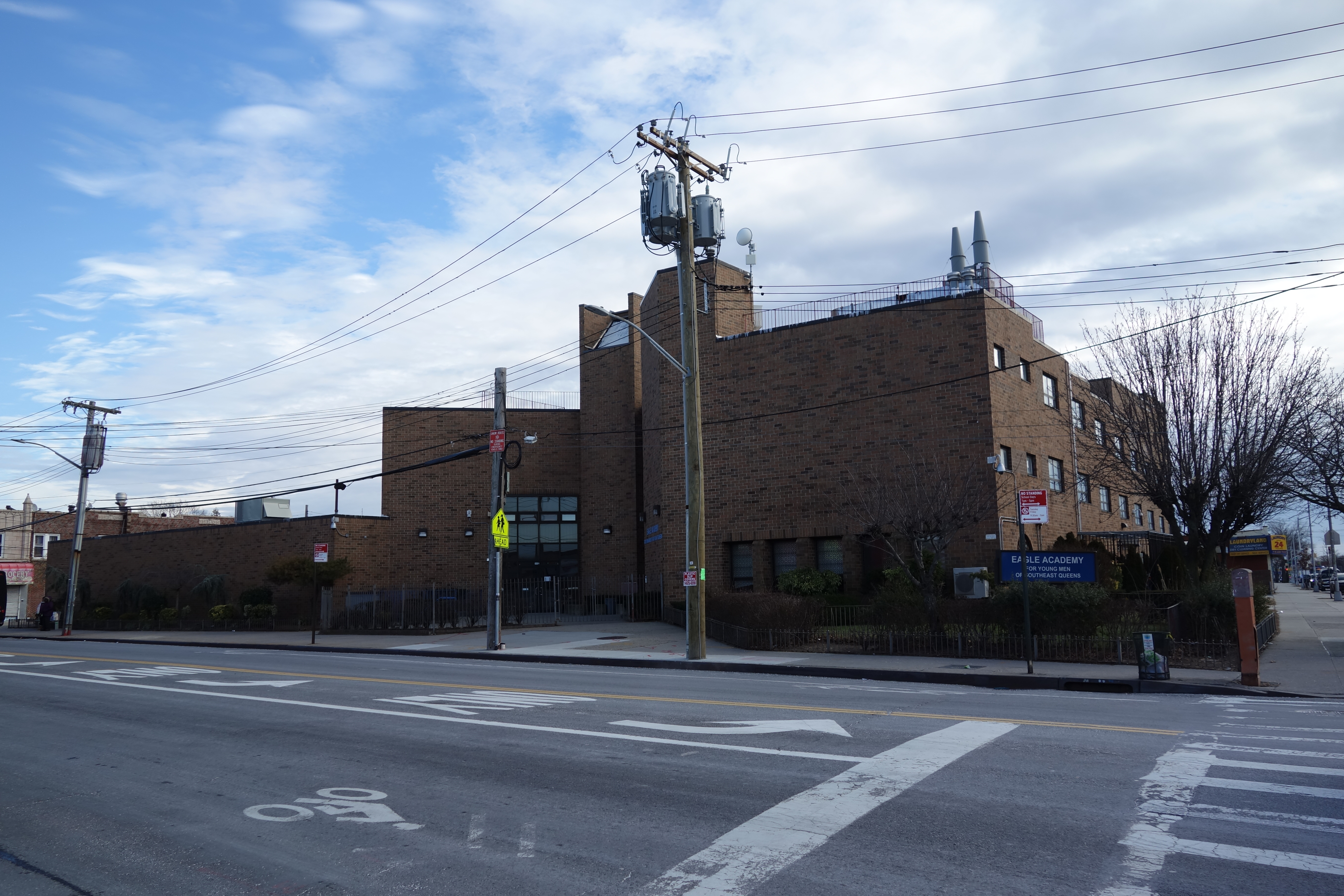
Eagle Academy III

St. Albans and Jamaica generally have a lower rate of college-educated residents than the rest of the city as of 2018. While 29% of residents age 25 and older have a college education or higher, 19% have less than a high school education and 51% are high school graduates or have some college education. By contrast, 39% of Queens residents and 43% of city residents have a college education or higher. The percentage of St. Albans and Jamaica students excelling in math rose from 36% in 2000 to 55% in 2011, and reading achievement increased slightly from 44% to 45% during the same time period.

St. Albans and Jamaica's rate of elementary school student absenteeism is more than the rest of New York City. In St. Albans and Jamaica, 22% of elementary school students missed twenty or more days per school year, higher than the citywide average of 20%. Additionally, 74% of high school students in St. Albans and Jamaica graduate on time, about the same as the citywide average of 75%.

=== Schools ===
==== Public ====
Public schools are operated by the New York City Department of Education (NYCDOE). St. Albans contains the following public elementary schools which serve grades PK-5 unless otherwise indicated:

- PS 15 Jackie Robinson
- PS 36 St. Albans (grades K-5)
- PS 136 Roy Wilkins

The following public middle schools serve grades 6–8:

- IS 59 Springfield Gardens
- IS 192 The Linden

Eagle Academy for Young Men III, a combined public middle and high school, serves grades 6–12.

==== Private and charter ====
There are three charter schools:

- Riverton Street Charter School St. Albans
- Success Academy Springfield Gardens
- Achievement First Legacy Elementary School

Private schools include:

- St. Albans Christian Academy
- True Deliverance Christian School
- St. Catherine of Sienna Catholic School (opened 1929, closed 2009, now site of Riverton Street Charter School)

=== Library ===
The Queens Public Library operates the St.Albans branch at 191-05 Linden Boulevard.

== Transportation ==
Numerous MTA bus lines run through the neighborhood, including the Q3, Q4, Q5, Q42, Q51, Q77, Q83, Q84, Q85, Q86, Q87, Q89, QM63, and QM64 all of which connect to the New York City Subway and the Long Island Rail Road (LIRR) at Jamaica Center and Jamaica, respectively. The LIRR's St. Albans station serves the neighborhood.

== Notable people ==
St. Albans was home to many artists of the jazz, hip-hop, and rap music genres. The following notable people are known to have lived in the area:

Music

- Count Basie (1904–1984), jazz pianist, lived at 174-27 Adelaide Rd.
- Joe Benjamin (1919–1974), jazz bassist.
- Brook Benton (1931–1988), singer and songwriter
- Earl Bostic, saxophonist, lived at 178-16 Murdock Avenue
- James Brown (1933–2006), recording artist and musician
- John Coltrane (1926–1967), jazz saxophonist and composer
- Eddie "Lockjaw" Davis (1922–1986), saxophonist
- Miles Davis (1926–1991), jazz musician
- Phife Dawg (1970–2016), rapper and member of A Tribe Called Quest
- Mercer Ellington, jazz trumpeter, composer, and arranger, lived at 113-02 175th St.
- Ella Fitzgerald, jazz vocalist, lived at 179-07 Murdock Av.
- Karl Grossman, journalist and professor of journalism.
- Milt Hinton, jazz double bassist and photographer, lived at 173-05 113th Av.
- Lena Horne (1917–2010), singer, lived at 112-45 178th St.
- Weldon Irvine, jazz pianist, composer and poet
- Illinois Jacquet, jazz tenor saxophonist, lived at 112-44 179th St.
- Russell Jacquet, lived at 112-32 179th St.
- LL Cool J, rapper, entrepreneur, and actor
- Bill Kenny, Pop and R&B vocalist & lead singer of The Ink Spots
- Wendell Marshall, jazz bassist and last surviving member of Duke Ellington's orchestra
- Rose Murphy, vocalist, pianist, lived at 114-28 180th St.
- Larry Smith, hip-hop producer
- Eileen Southern, musicologist
- Slam Stewart, jazz bass player, lived at 114-28 180th St.
- William Grant Still, classical composer
- A Tribe Called Quest, rap group
- Q-Tip, musician, actor and member of A Tribe Called Quest
- Mal Waldron, jazz pianist
- Fats Waller, jazz pianist, lived at 173-19 Sayres Av.
- Frank Wess, jazz musician
- Cootie Williams, trumpeter, lived at 175-19 Linden Blvd.
- Lester Young, jazz tenor saxophonist and clarinetist

Sports

- Bad News Allen (1943–2007), 1976 bronze medalist (Olympic Judo) and pro-wrestler
- Roy Campanella (1921–1993), 1950s All-Star catcher with Brooklyn Dodgers, lived at 114-10 179th St.
- Bob Cousy, 1950s All-Star basketball player with Boston Celtics
- Joe Louis (1914–1981), heavyweight boxing champion, lived at 175-12 Murdock Av.
- Floyd Patterson (1935–2006), heavyweight boxing champion
- Will Poole, football player
- Jackie Robinson (1919–1972), Major League Baseball player, lived at 112-40 177th St.
- Babe Ruth (1895–1948), baseball legend
- Eddie Sweat, Secretariat's groom

Other

- Alonzo Bodden (born 1962), comedian, actor and radio personality
- John Henry Brinckerhoff (1829–1903), merchant and public official
- W. E. B. Du Bois (1868–1963), sociologist, historian, civil rights activist, Pan-Africanist, author and editor. W. E. B. Du Bois and Shirley Graham Du Bois, both lived at 173-19 113th Road
- Anna Lee Fisher (born 1949), astronaut
- Lester Ford (born 1963), serial killer
- Clarence L. Irving (1924–2014), cultural activist and mentor who made significant contributions to African-American history and heritage.
- Alex Katz (born 1927), painter best known for his large-scale landscape paintings and portraits of friends and family
- Al Roker (born 1954), meteorologist
- Percy Sutton (1920–2009), black political leader, lived at 114-19 179th Street
- Joan Vohs (1927–2001), film actress
- Roy Wilkins (1901–1981), longtime NAACP Head, Civil Rights activist

=== Jazz legacy ===
Famous stride pianist Fats Waller was the first well-known musician to move into Addisleigh Park at the peak of his career in the late 1930s. Waller had grown up in the Church (his father was a pastor). He subsequently had his home in Addisleigh Park fashioned with a built-in Hammond organ. He died in 1943 from bronchial pneumonia.

In 1937, jazz pianist and bandleader Count Basie moved his orchestra from Kansas City to New York. Count Basie's orchestra performed at world-famous Manhattan venues including the Roseland Ballroom, the Savoy Ballroom, and the Woodside Hotel. In 1946, Basie and his wife, Katy, bought a home in Addisleigh Park, where the couple lived until 1973 when it was sold to bandleader/singer/pianist, Robert (Bubber) Johnson.

Singer, film actress, and Civil Rights Activist Lena Horne also moved into the Addisleigh Park neighborhood in the year 1946. Soon after Horne, jazz trumpeter and bandleader Mercer Ellington, son of jazz great Duke Ellington, moved into Addisleigh Park in 1948. Eight years earlier, he had worked for renowned jazz trumpeter Cootie Williams as his road manager. Cootie Williams bought a home in Addisleigh Park in 1947. While residing in Addisleigh Park, Mercer Ellington employed Dizzy Gillespie, Kenny Dorham, and Charles Mingus. Throughout the 1940s, Mercer and his father, Duke Ellington, frequently borrowed musicians from one another's ensembles.

Saxophonist Earl Bostic moved to Addisleigh Park in 1948, the same year Bostic's sextet hit success with their first single "Temptation". Bostic was born in Tulsa, Oklahoma. In the early 1930s, he played with Midwestern territory bands before moving to New York City in 1938 to play with Don Redman. Bostic's second hit, "Flamingo", was produced in 1951, while he was still living in Addisleigh Park. In 1956, Bostic and his wife left Addisleigh Park to settle in Los Angeles. Earl Bostic died onstage from a heart attack in Rochester, New York, in 1965.

Bostic's neighbors on Murdock Avenue were Ella Fitzgerald and her then-husband, famous bassist and cellist Ray Brown. Fitzgerald owned her Addisleigh Park home from 1949 until 1956. During the late 1930s and early 1940s, Fitzgerald had become one of the most recognizable names of wide-release swing music in the United States. She met Brown in 1946 while on tour with Dizzy Gillespie's band. The couple divorced in 1952. Between the years 1949 and 1956, Fitzgerald sang scat with various bebop bands. She was awarded the Presidential Medal of Freedom by President George H. W. Bush in 1992.

Vicksburg, Mississippi, native and famous jazz bassist Milt Hinton moved into Addisleigh Park in 1950. In his younger years, he had lived and worked in Chicago alongside celebrated jazz musicians Art Tatum and Eddie South. He moved to New York City for a job in Cab Calloway's orchestra in 1936. Hinton bought a home on 113th Avenue in Addisleigh Park in 1950. He lived in the neighborhood until his death in 2000.

Saxophonist John Coltrane bought a home on Mexico Street in Addisleigh Park in the year 1959. Coltrane had just met tremendous critical success after his collaborations with Thelonious Monk and Miles Davis. In January 1960, Coltrane released Giant Steps, his first album with Atlantic Records. Giant Steps is considered to be the album that catapulted Coltrane into jazz legend.

== See also ==
- African Center for Community Empowerment
