= ACCE =

ACCE may refer to:

- Academy for College and Career Exploration
- Access Bank plc, a bank which trades on the Nigerian Stock Exchange as ACCE
- African Center for Community Empowerment
- American City County Exchange, a division of the American Legislative Exchange Council
