= Springfield Gardens station =

Train station in New York City (1873–1979)

Springfield Gardens

General information
- Location: Springfield Boulevard and Carson Street; Springfield Gardens, Queens, New York
- Coordinates: 40.675464°N 73.755380°W
- Owner: LIRR
- Line: Montauk Branch
- Platforms: 1 island platform
- Tracks: 2
- Connections: NYCT: Q77

Other information
- Station code: None
- Fare zone: 3

History
- Opened: 1873
- Closed: October 13, 1979
- Electrified: May 21, 1925
- Former names: Springfield

Former services
Preceding station	Long Island Rail Road	Following station
St. Albans toward Penn Station or Long Island City	Montauk Branch	Rosedale toward Montauk
Preceding station	Long Island Rail Road	Following station
St. Albans toward Rockaway Junction	New York and Rockaway Railroad	Ocean Point toward Far Rockaway–Lockwood's Grove
Location

Springfield Gardens was an island platform station that existed along the Babylon-Montauk Branch of the Long Island Rail Road, in the Springfield Gardens section of Queens, New York City. The station was located between St. Albans and Rosedale stations, north of Springfield Junction. The only visible evidence of the station today is a wide gap between the tracks.

== History ==
It first opened around the 1870s by the New York and Rockaway Railroad as Springfield station (a name also given to a former station on the Atlantic Branch near Higbie Avenue).

=== Location ===
It was originally located on Merrick Boulevard until May 1885 when it was moved to the southeast side of Springfield Road (now Springfield Boulevard). The line was electrified on May 21, 1925 and the station was renamed Springfield Gardens in October 1927. On July 24, 1936, the station was rebuilt as part of a grade elimination project.

=== Closure ===
On May 21, 1973, the LIRR announced plans to significantly reduce service at Union Hall Street, Springfield Gardens, and St. Albans, with only a few trains stopping during rush hours. At Springfield Gardens, service was limited to a single westbound train leaving at 7:41 a.m., and a single eastbound train, leaving at 5:20 p.m. The station closed on October 13, 1979 due to very low ridership, nearby alternate forms of transportation, and the high cost of maintaining the station. In July 1979, only 51 people used the station. A LIRR spokesperson said that more frequent service was available at the nearby Locust Manor and Laurelton stops, and that bus service stopped nearby. The spokesman said that the high $500,000 cost of doing needed maintenance work to the station building and platform meant it had to be closed.
