= Cedarhurst Cut-off =

Former Long Island Rail Road branch

Cedarhurst Cut-Off
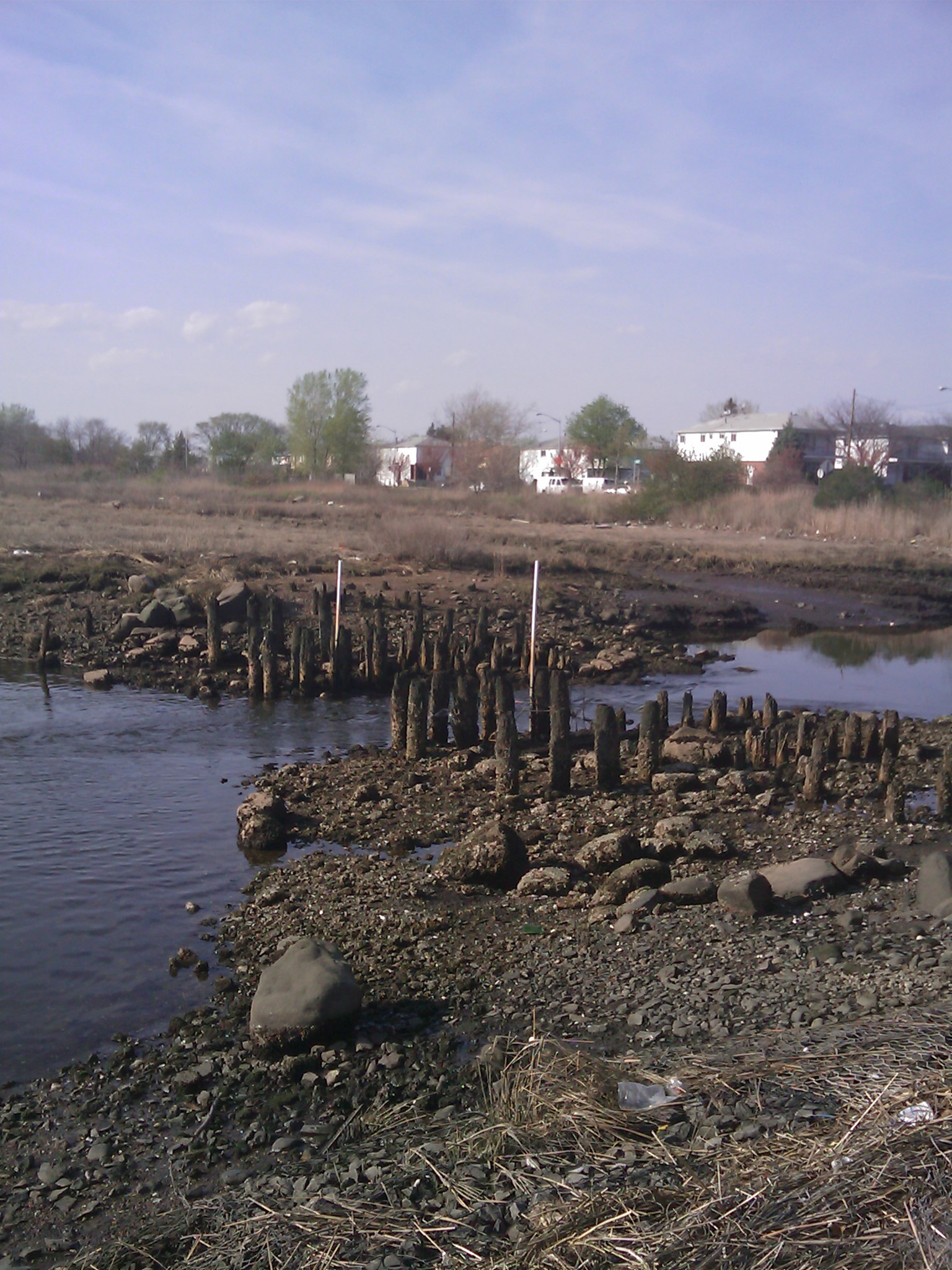
- Remains of a bridge for the Cedarhurst Cut-Off connecting Queens and Nassau Counties at the northeast corner of North Woodmere Park.

Overview
- Status: Abandoned south of Springfield Junction
- Locale: Queens, New York City
- Termini: Hollis (northwest); Cedarhurst (southwest)
- Stations: 3 open, 5 closed (line abandoned)

Service
- Type: Passenger and Freight
- Operator(s): Long Island Rail Road

History
- Opened: December 30, 1871
- Closed: 1934

Technical
- Line length: 3.4 miles (5.5 km) (Abandoned section)
- Track gauge: 4 ft 8 1/2 in (1,435 mm)

The Cedarhurst Cut-off was a rail line owned and operated by the Long Island Rail Road on Long Island, in New York, United States.

The line split from the LIRR's Main Line at Rockaway Junction (near Hollis) and ran south via Springfield Gardens and Cedarhurst and on to Far Rockaway. The portion north of the crossing of the old Southern Railroad of Long Island at Springfield Junction is now part of the Montauk Branch, while the rest has been abandoned in favor of the ex-Southern Far Rockaway Branch.

== History ==
The New York and Rockaway Railroad was incorporated December 30, 1871 to build from the LIRR Main Line east of Jamaica south to Rockaway in competition with the South Side Railroad's Far Rockaway Branch. In exchange for completing it, the LIRR agreed to lease the line on March 2, 1871. It opened from the Main Line south to Springfield Gardens on June 21, 1871, and to Mott Avenue in Far Rockaway on May 14, 1872.

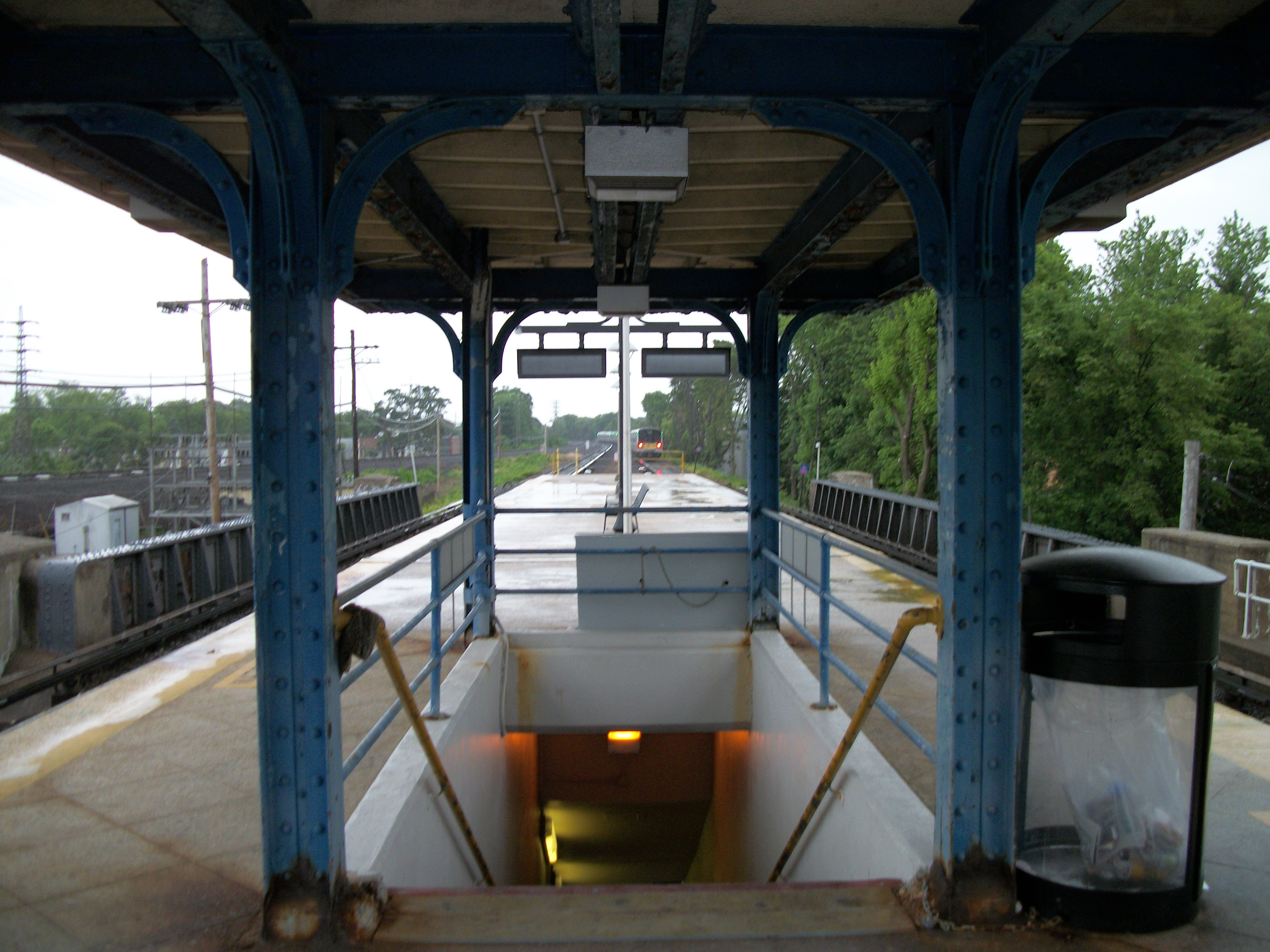
Springfield Junction, as seen from Laurelton Station on the Atlantic Branch

After the LIRR and South Side were brought under common ownership in 1876, the line was abandoned from Springfield Junction south to Cedarhurst on June 2. The portion north of Springfield Junction was connected to the old South Side main line, and is still the main Montauk Branch line.

The line between Springfield Junction and Cedarhurst has been rebuilt and abandoned twice, with electrification, first between 1905 and 1908 to help relieve the traffic off the Far Rockaway Branch; however, for unknown reasons the branch was never put into revenue service and instead was used to route equipment. In 1918, the rails were torn up and used for World War I, and in 1928 the LIRR – in an effort to protect their right of way with the anticipation of new street and residential development in the Southeastern portions of Queens, relayed the track with third rail. In spite of this, with service to the Rockaways sufficiently served by the Far Rockaway Branch, the cut-off was deemed redundant and torn up for good in 1934. The new street grid being laid down in the area was designed around the cut-off, leading to an unusual street pattern in the Rosedale section of Queens in the area of the now vanished cut-off. The line currently passes through marshland within Brookville Park.

A right of way is preserved along the northern boundary of North Woodmere Park, with no development taking place where the rail line once was.

The New York and Rockaway Railroad was sold at foreclosure on May 27, 1903 and reorganized as the Jamaica and South Shore Railroad on October 18. The Jamaica and South Shore was merged into the LIRR on December 6, 1912.

== Stations ==
Besides the existing and former stations along the current Montauk Branch, stations along the line included the following;

Station	Miles (km) from Penn Station	Date opened	Date closed	Connections / notes
For continuing service to points west, see Main Line (Long Island Rail Road)
Rockaway Junction		June 24, 1890	1905	Also called Woodhull Park
St. Albans	13.6 (21.9)	July 1, 1898		LIRR: Babylon and West Hempstead Branches Originally named Locust Avenue
Springfield Gardens		1873	October 30, 1979	Originally Springfield
Atlantic Branch converges at Springfield Junction; Segment south of the junction was abandoned in 1934
Ocean Point				Not to be confused with Cedarhurst station, also formerly known as Ocean Point
Lawrence				
Far Rockaway–Lockwood's Grove		1872	September 1877	

== See also ==
- History of the Long Island Rail Road
- Rockaway Beach Branch
