= Clean Rite Center =

Laundry services provider company in US

- Company type: Private
- Industry: Cleaning
- Founded: 1996; 29 years ago in Springfield Gardens, Queens, US
- Founder: Alexander Weiss
- Website: cleanritecenter.com

Clean Rite Center is an American laundromat chain, founded in 1996, and owned and operated by Alexander Weiss in the United States.

== History ==
Clean Rite Center was founded in 1996 by Alexander Weiss. It started its first laundry in Springfield Gardens, Queens. It began with a focus on creating organized laundry centers in municipal areas. The company expanded to several areas, including New York City's five boroughs, in addition to Columbus, Ohio, Allentown, Pennsylvania, as well as Baltimore and Gwynn Oaks, Maryland, and most of which are open 24 hours. features over 150 washers and dryers per store.

In March 2020, Clean Rite Center began providing free laundry services to hospital staff in the Bronx, New York, to support doctors and nurses during the COVID-19 pandemic. In May 2021, Clean Rite Center partnered with Mr. Jeff, a Spanish laundry pickup and delivery franchise, allowing customers to access Mr. Jeff's services.

In February 2022, Clean Rite entered into a partnership with United Community Schools (UCS) to provide pre-paid laundry cards to students and their families within the UCS network. The cards are redeemable for laundry services, including the use of washers and dryers, and for the purchase of detergent at participating Clean Rite locations. The initiative is financed through funding allocated by the City Council, with partial subsidization provided by Clean Rite. In April 2022, Clean Rite set up reading areas for children at some locations through its Read, Play, Learn program to encourage learning.

Clean Rite Center provides different laundry services, including washing and folding, as well as pick-up and delivery. The Clean Rite Center payment system allows customers to use refillable cards to work the machines instead of cash.
