= Higbie Avenue station =

Train station in New York City (1908–60)

Higbie Avenue

General information
- Location: 140th and Edgewood Avenues; Springfield, Queens, New York City
- Coordinates: 40.672328°N 73.760102°W
- Owner: Long Island Rail Road
- Line: Atlantic Branch
- Platforms: 2 side platforms
- Tracks: 2

Other information
- Station code: None
- Fare zone: 3

History
- Opened: 1908
- Closed: February 2, 1960
- Electrified: July 26, 1905
- Former names: Springfield

Former services
Preceding station	Long Island Rail Road	Following station
Locust Manor toward Flatbush Avenue	Atlantic Division	Laurelton toward Valley Stream
Location

Higbie Avenue was a railroad station along the Atlantic Branch of the Long Island Rail Road, in Queens, New York City. The station was located on 140th Avenue (formerly Higbie Avenue) and Edgewood Avenue in the Springfield section of Queens, New York City between Locust Manor and Laurelton stations.

== History ==
=== Springfield station ===
The South Side Railroad of Long Island established service on Springfield Boulevard on the Atlantic Branch on October 28, 1867 but did not install a station house until August or September 1871. The station was moved to Laurelton in August 1876, but kept the name "Springfield." In 1905, the Atlantic Branch was electrified, but following the development of the area by the Laurelton Land Company, the station was torn down in 1906, and split between Laurelton and Higbie Avenue stations.

=== Higbie Avenue station ===
Higbie Avenue station was built in 1908 as one of two replacements for a former South Side Railroad of Long Island station on Springfield Road known as Springfield station, a name also given to a former station on the Montauk Branch which itself was renamed Springfield Gardens Station. SSRLI's Springfield station existed from October 28, 1867 to 1906. The newer station itself was named Springfield station until September 1927.

Higbie Avenue station always consisted of a small shack on an embankment. Though it ran on the Atlantic Branch, it only served Far Rockaway Branch trains; however, between 1950 and 1955, it also served Rockaway Beach Branch trains due to the 1950 fire on the bridge over Jamaica Bay.

In 1948, the White Engineering Corporation completed a three-volume study for the Pennsylvania Railroad on how to save the Long Island Rail Road from bankruptcy and how to make it self-sufficient. This study, which was made public in August 1949, made several recommendations, including the abandonment of eleven LIRR stations to save $96,000, of which three (Atlantic venue, Inwood, and Merillon Avenue) were in Nassau County, and eight were in Queens, including Hamilton Beach, the Raunt, Elmhurst, Corona, Higbie Avenue, and Cedar Manor.

In 1949, the Long Island Rail Road (LIRR) requested permission from the New York State Public Service Commission (PSC) to discontinue this and Cedar Manor station to reduce the cost of its planned project to eliminate grade crossings on the Atlantic Branch between Springfield Boulevard and South Road. The PSC ordered the LIRR to construct twelve-car long high-level side platforms at both stations, along with shelters. The PSC had determined that ridership at the two stations was high enough to require their continuation.

In 1955, the LIRR again requested permission from the PSC to discontinue Cedar Manor and Higbie Avenue stations. The LIRR claimed that while total ridership at the two stations was 15,000 and 28,400 in July 1949, respectively, ridership decreased by 70 percent at Cedar Manor, and by 60 at Higbie Avenue. At a PSC hearing, a passenger representative of the LIRR said that alternate means of transportation from the two stations to Jamaica and Penn Station would only take ten minutes longer. On July 22, 1955, the PSC allowed the LIRR to close Cedar Manor station, but not the Higbie Avenue station. The PSC found that alternate transportation was available at Cedar Manor in the form of bus service, while there was none at Higbie Avenue. Cedar Manor was ordered to stay open until the temporary tracks for the grade crossing elimination project were installed. The LIRR had stated that ridership had significantly declined at the two stations in recent years and that closing them would save $350,000.

On October 15, 1958, the PSC announced that the Long Island Rail Road (LIRR) had sought permission to eliminate agent service at the station. As part of the Old Southern–Rosedale grade-crossing elimination project underway, the station was to be relocated to Farmers Boulevard. On January 27, 1960, the westbound station platform closed with the placement of the elevated westbound track into service, and the eastbound platform closed on February 2, 1960, with the completion of the eastbound track, which completed the Atlantic Branch grade elimination project. The $9,235,000 project elevated the branch over 111th Avenue, Linden Boulevard, New York Boulevard, Foch Boulevard, Baisley Boulevard, Farmers Boulevard, Higbie Avenue, and Springfield Boulevard, and constructed pedestrian underpasses at 109th Avenue and 108th Avenue. $225,000 was spent to construct a bridge to open Brinkerhoff Avenue across the rail line. The project also consolidated Higbie Avenue station and Locust Manor station, which had been located at Jamaica Racetrack with a new Locust Manor station midway between the two at Farmers Boulevard.
