= Springfield Junction (Long Island Rail Road) =

Railroad junction in New York, United States

Coordinates: 40°40′3.3″N 73°44′58.2″W

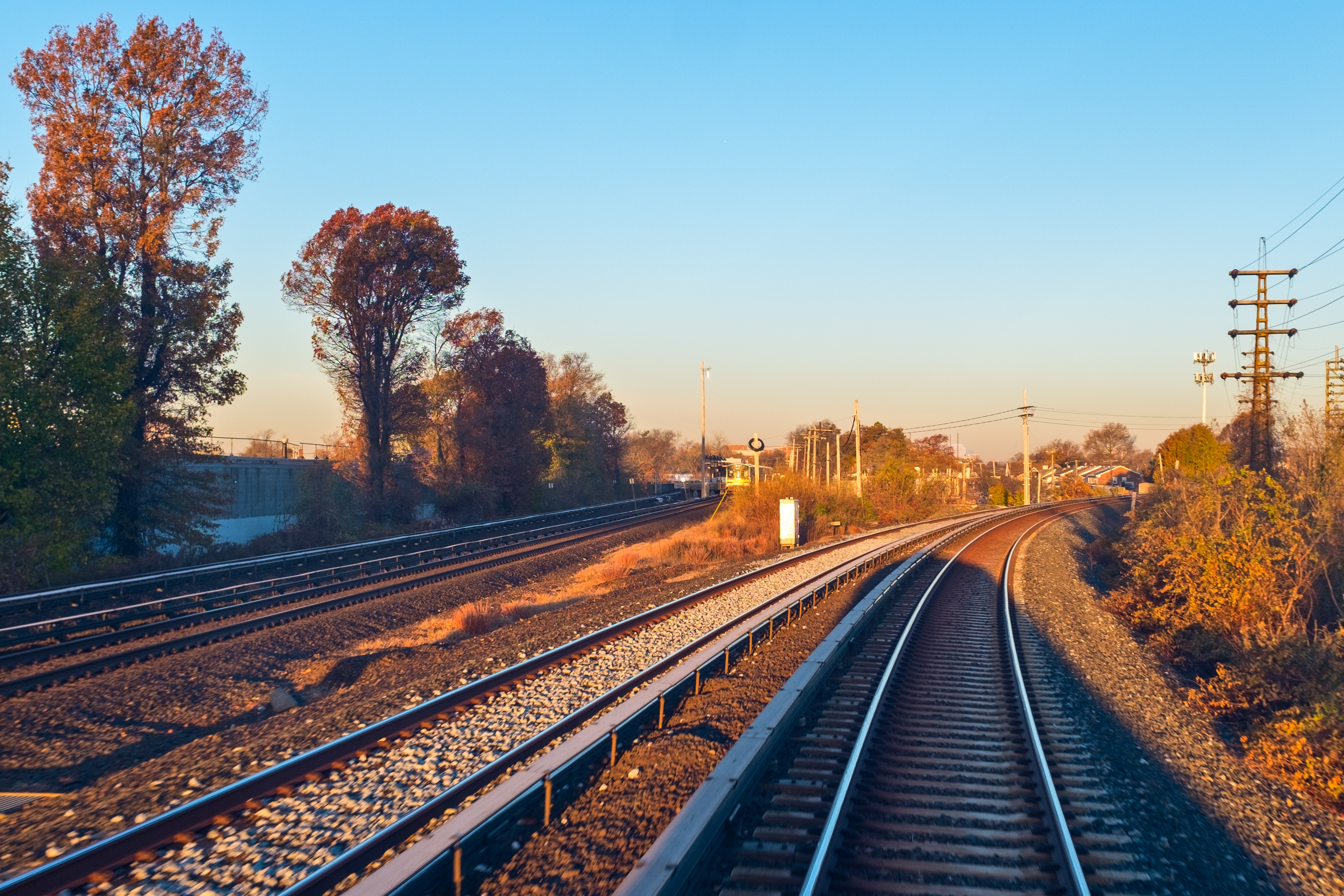
Approximate location of the former Springfield Junction today

Springfield Junction was a junction between the Long Island Rail Road's Montauk Branch and Atlantic Branch in Laurelton, Queens, New York City, United States. It was located at the place where those two branches now begin to parallel, just east of Laurelton station and half a mile east of Springfield Boulevard. No rail station was located at the junction itself, however Springfield Gardens station was located nearby.

== History ==
The junction's location was set in 1871, when the LIRR's Rockaway Branch (now the Montauk Branch) was built, crossing the South Side Railroad of Long Island (now the Atlantic Branch). With the consolidation of the South Side into the LIRR system in 1876, all South Side passenger trains were rerouted to use the LIRR main line through Jamaica to Rockaway Junction and the LIRR's Rockaway Branch to this crossing, where a connecting track was built. This change took effect Sunday, June 25, 1876. A new Atlantic Division track opened alongside the Montauk Division east of the junction in 1906, changing the junction into a connecting track between the two lines. That connection was later removed on September 10, 1923.
