= Rosedale station (LIRR) =

Long Island Rail Road station in Queens, New York

Rosedale
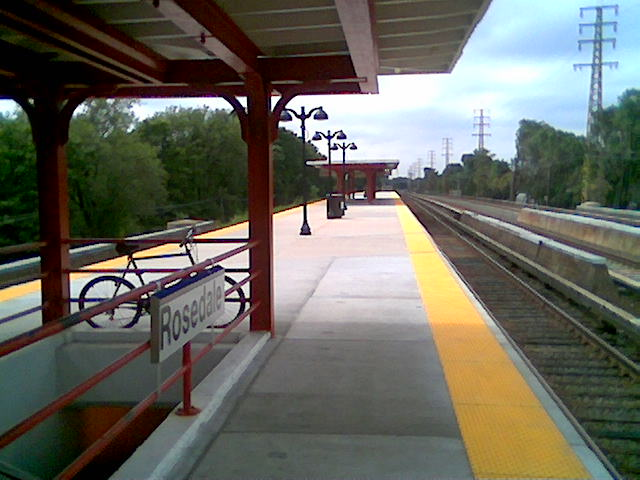
- The Rosedale station, looking west

General information
- Location: Francis Lewis Boulevard and Sunrise Highway; Rosedale, Queens, New York
- Coordinates: 40.6659°N 73.7356°W
- Owner: Long Island Rail Road
- Line: Atlantic Branch
- Distance: 14.0 mi (22.5 km) from Atlantic Terminal
- Platforms: 1 island platform
- Tracks: 2 (Atlantic Branch), 2 (Montauk Branch)
- Connections: NYCT Bus: Q5, Q85, Q86, Q89

Construction
- Parking: Yes; municipal parking (New York City permit required)
- Accessible: Yes

Other information
- Station code: ROS
- Fare zone: 3

History
- Opened: May 1870 (SSRRLI)
- Rebuilt: 1889, 1950, 2005
- Electrified: May 17, 1906; 750 V (DC) third rail
- Former names: Foster's Meadow (1870–1892)

Passengers
- 2012—2014: 2,476 per weekday
- Rank: 45 of 125

Services
Preceding station	Long Island Rail Road	Following station
Laurelton toward Penn Station or Grand Central	Far Rockaway Branch weekdays	Valley Stream toward Far Rockaway
Laurelton toward Penn Station or Grand Central	Long Beach Branch weekends	Valley Stream toward Long Beach
Former services
Preceding station	Long Island Rail Road	Following station
Springfield Gardens toward Long Island City	Montauk Division	Valley Stream toward Montauk
Laurelton toward Flatbush Avenue	Atlantic Division	Valley Stream Terminus
Location

Rosedale is a station on the Long Island Rail Road's Atlantic Branch. The station is located in the Rosedale neighborhood of Queens, New York City, at Sunrise Highway (NY 27), Francis Lewis Boulevard, and 243rd Street. The station is included in the MTA's CityTicket program.

== History ==
Rosedale station was originally built by the South Side Railroad of Long Island. Depending on the source, the original station was built either on October 28, 1867, in May 1870, or in July 1871. It was originally named "Foster's Meadow." The station was abandoned in 1889 but may have been subsequently used as a freight house.

The second station was built also in 1889, and renamed "Rosedale" in 1892. The eastbound station facilities were relocated south of the former station on November 26, 1941, in anticipation of a future grade separation project, but they returned north on March 10, 1942, when the project was halted, likely due to concentration on surplus for World War II. All facilities were ultimately relocated south of the former location again between November 16–18, 1948 when the grade separation project resumed. Temporary facilities were built south of the former location on the same days, while the second depot was razed that month.

The current elevated station finally opened for westbound trains on October 31, 1950, and for eastbound trains on November 27, 1950.

== Station layout ==
This station has one 10-car long island platform between Tracks 1 and 2. These tracks are part of the Atlantic Branch, while the bypass tracks north of Track 1 are part of the Montauk Branch and carry trains on that branch as well as the Babylon Branch and West Hempstead Branch.

Toward the center of the island platform are staircases going down to either side of Francis Lewis Boulevard, which passes under the station. The westernmost staircase has a canopy. The other staircase is at the canopy that covers the brick waiting room that has two small waiting areas with a non-public area in between where the ticket office and windows were once was in. The canopy ends before reaching the eastern side of the platform where a single staircase leads down to a small pedestrian underpass. On the other side of this underpass is an elevator installed in 2008 going up to the extreme eastern end of the platform at the very end of it. There is a small canopy over the upper landing. This underpass leads to Sunrise Highway to the south and North Conduit Avenue to the north between 243rd and 244th Streets running between a police station and its parking lot to reach it. A rack to lock up bicycles is available between the underpass and the police station.

=== Parking ===
A park and ride facility used to occupy the space currently used by the police station. A NYC Department of Transportation muni-meter parking lot is located to the west of the police station, at the southeast corner of North Conduit Avenue and Francis Lewis Boulevard. Permit parking was cancelled for the field at the southwest corner of North Conduit Avenue and Francis Lewis Boulevard in September 2018. All parking is now at the daily metered rates. 73 of the parking spaces in the Municipal Parking Field are allocated and reserved for use by the new 116th Police Precinct.
