= Laurelton station =

Long Island Rail Road station in Queens, New York

Laurelton
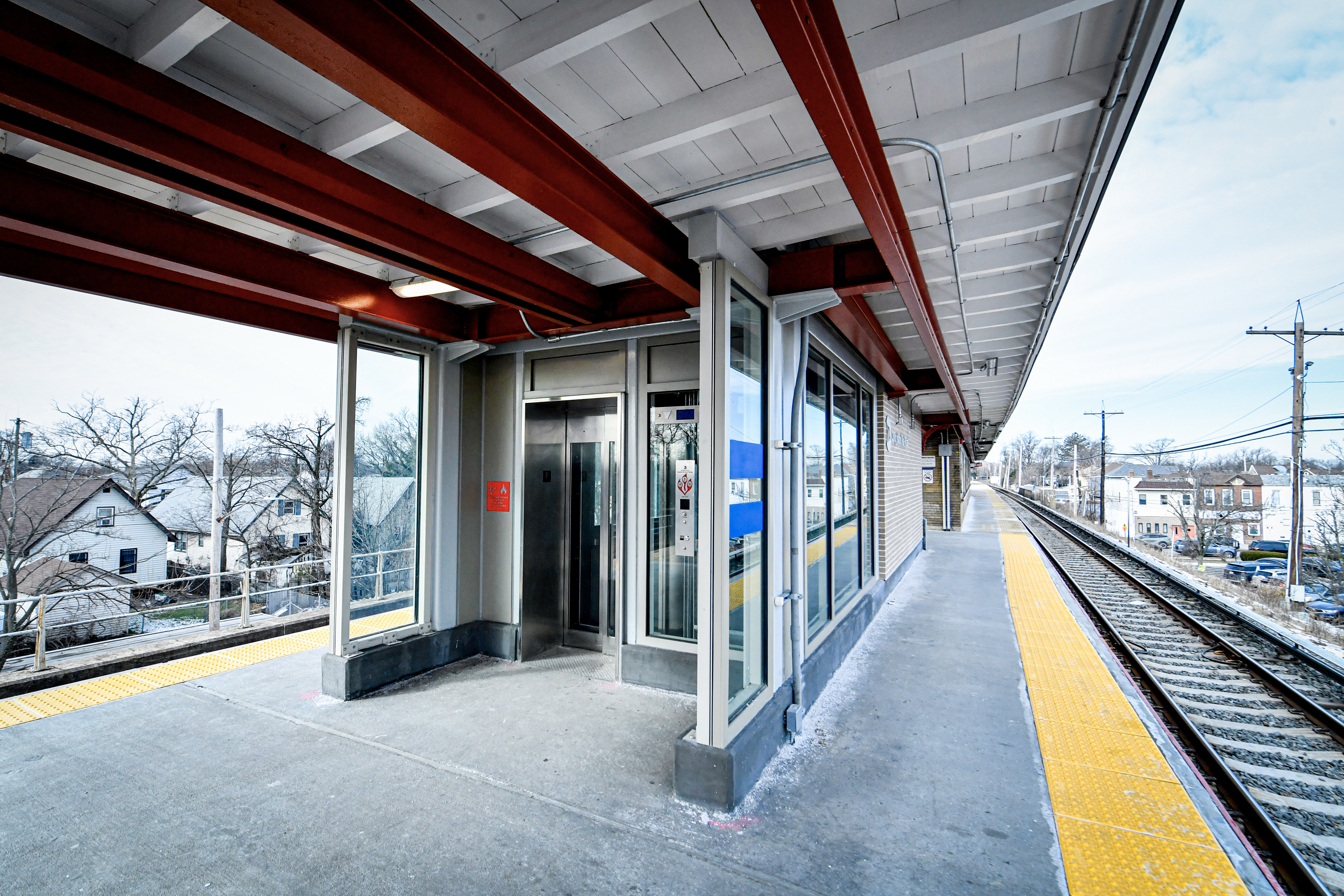
- The Laurelton station in 2026

General information
- Location: 224th Street and 141st Road; Laurelton, Queens, New York
- Coordinates: 40.66853°N 73.7518°W
- Owner: Long Island Rail Road
- Line: Atlantic Branch
- Distance: 13.1 mi (21.1 km) from Atlantic Terminal
- Platforms: 1 island platform
- Tracks: 2
- Connections: NYCT Bus: Q85, Q89

Construction
- Parking: Yes
- Accessible: Yes

Other information
- Station code: LTN
- Fare zone: 3

History
- Opened: April 1907
- Rebuilt: 1941, 1942, 1948–1950
- Electrified: October 16, 1905; 750 V (DC) third rail
- Former names: Central Avenue

Passengers
- 2012—2014: 1,832
- Rank: 55 of 125

Services
Preceding station	Long Island Rail Road	Following station
Locust Manor toward Penn Station or Grand Central	Far Rockaway Branch weekdays	Rosedale toward Far Rockaway
Locust Manor toward Penn Station or Grand Central	Long Beach Branch weekends	Rosedale toward Long Beach
Former services
Preceding station	Long Island Rail Road	Following station
Higbie Avenue toward Flatbush Avenue	Atlantic Division	Rosedale toward Valley Stream
Location

Laurelton is a station on the Long Island Rail Road's Atlantic Branch, located at the intersection of 225th Street and 141st Road in the Laurelton neighborhood of Queens, New York City. It is 14.9 miles (24.0 km) from Penn Station in Midtown Manhattan. The station is included in the MTA's CityTicket program.

== History ==
=== 20th century ===
==== Early history ====
The Laurelton station was originally built by the Long Island Rail Road in April 1907. The line was electrified through the area on October 16, 1905 – two years prior to the station's opening. The station was one of two along the Atlantic Branch to replace the former Springfield station – the other being the Higbie Avenue station.

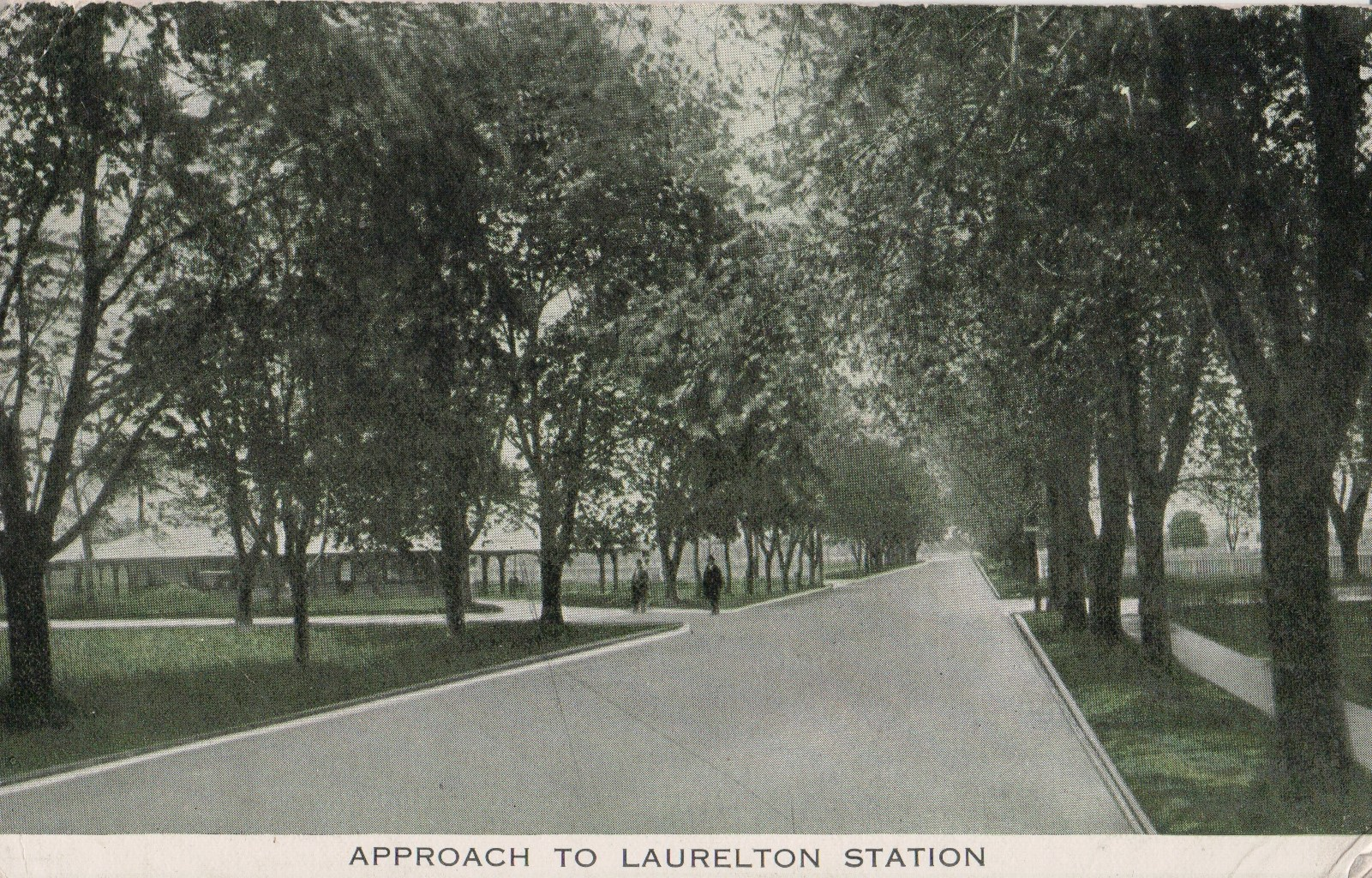
A 1908 postcard of the original station

Laurelton's original station house was built in connection with Dean Alvord's Laurelton Land Company – the company that developed the surrounding neighborhood of Laurelton. The tracks were laid below grade level, and a floral arrangement on the embankment spelled out the community's name. It was also located northwest of Springfield Junction.

==== Grade crossing elimination ====
On November 26, 1941, the eastbound facilities were relocated south in anticipation of a proposed grade crossing elimination project, but they were relocated north again on April 10, 1942, when the project was cancelled due to World War II. All facilities were again relocated south of the former location between November 16–18, 1948, when the aforementioned grade crossing elimination project was revived after the end of the war. The old station depot was razed sometime in 1950. The new elevated structure & station was opened for westbound trains on October 31, 1950, and for eastbound trains a few weeks later, on November 27, 1950.

=== 20th century ===
The station received major renovations in the early 2000s, receiving improved lighting and waiting room improvements. It underwent further renovations between 2018 and 2019, during which time it received upgraded features such as LED lighting, repainted canopies, and improved staircases.

In March 2022, the Metropolitan Transportation Authority announced that it would be making the Laurelton station and several other non-wheelchair-accessible stations in Queens compliant with the Americans with Disabilities Act of 1990, thus making the stations wheelchair-accessible. Elevators would be installed at the Laurelton station to make it accessible. The MTA approved contracts for the elevators' construction in November 2022. The elevator opened in December 2025.

== Station layout ==
This station has one high-level island platform that is eight cars long. There are enclosed waiting rooms and ticket vending machines on street level. The station's current appearance is similar to that of the neighboring Rosedale station.

== See also ==
- List of Long Island Rail Road stations
- Springfield Gardens station
