= St. Albans station (LIRR) =

Long Island Rail Road station in Queens, New York

St Albans
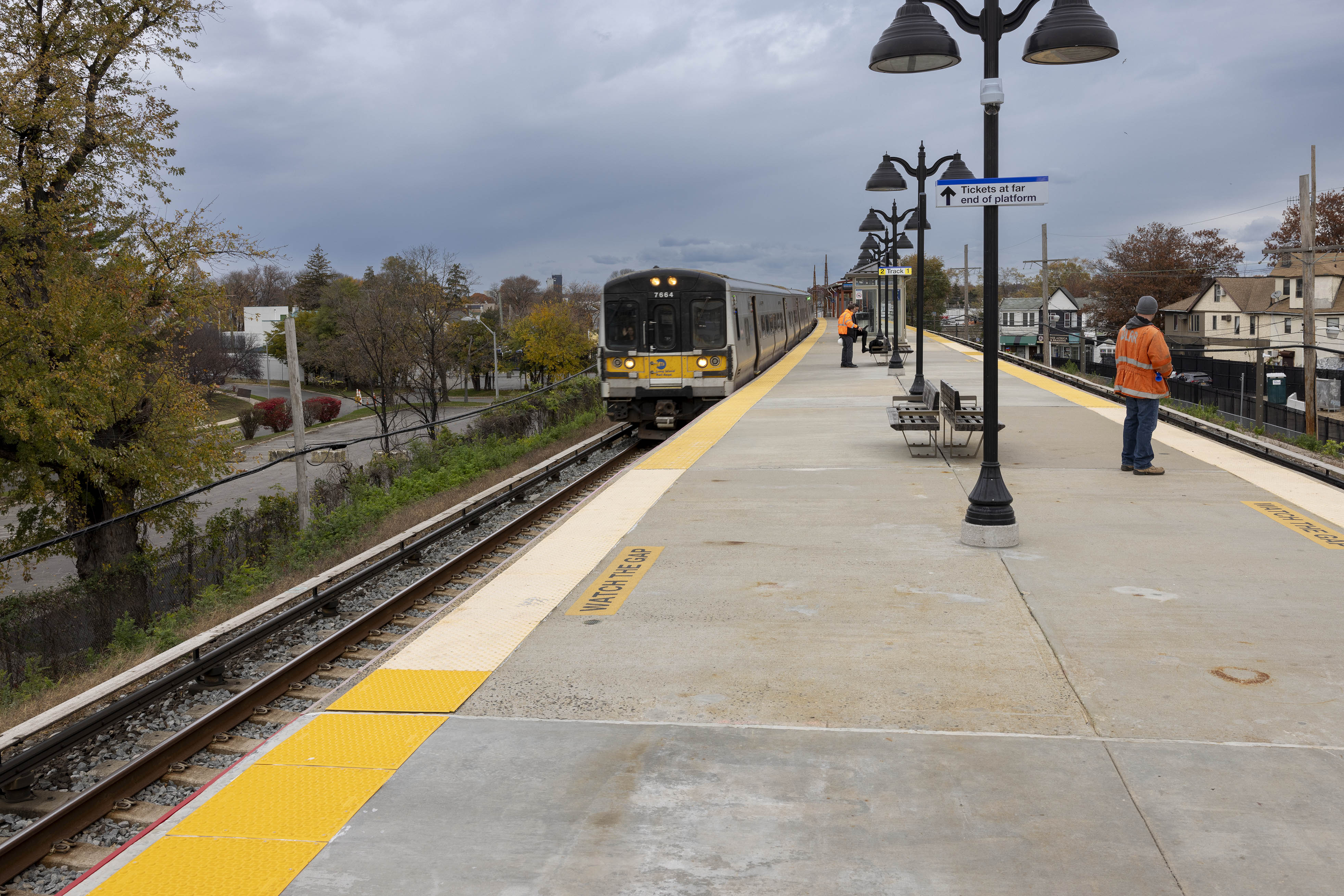
- The St. Albans station platform in 2025

General information
- Location: Linden Boulevard and Montauk Place; St. Albans, Queens, New York
- Coordinates: 40.691052°N 73.765426°W
- Owner: Long Island Rail Road
- Line: Montauk Branch
- Distance: 11.8 mi (19.0 km) from Long Island City
- Platforms: 1 island platform
- Tracks: 2
- Connections: NYCT Bus: Q4; MTA Bus: Q51

Construction
- Accessible: Yes

Other information
- Station code: SAB
- Fare zone: 3

History
- Opened: July 1, 1898
- Rebuilt: 1935
- Electrified: May 21, 1925; 750 V (DC) third rail
- Former names: Locust Avenue

Passengers
- 2012–2014: 461 per weekday
- Rank: 99 of 125

Services
Preceding station	Long Island Rail Road	Following station
Jamaica toward Penn Station, Grand Central or Atlantic Terminal	West Hempstead Branch	Westwood toward West Hempstead
Montauk Branch does not stop here
Babylon Branch does not stop here
Former services
Preceding station	Long Island Rail Road	Following station
Rockaway Junction toward Long Island City	Montauk Division	Springfield Gardens toward Montauk
Location

St. Albans is a station on the Long Island Rail Road's Montauk Branch in St. Albans, Queens, New York. It is located at the southwest corner of Linden Boulevard and Montauk Place, although the segment of Montauk Place that once intersected with Linden Boulevard has been abandoned and fenced off.

== History ==
In 1872, the LIRR's Cedarhurst Cut-off was built through the area, but no stop appeared at this location on the first timetables. The St. Albans station was built on July 1, 1898, and originally appeared on maps with the name of Locust Avenue (the same name as the station at the other end of what is now called Baisley Boulevard). The original station was razed in 1935 as part of a grade elimination project. The current elevated structure was opened either on October 22 or October 23, 1935.

On May 21, 1973, the LIRR announced plans to significantly reduce service at Union Hall Street, Springfield Gardens, and St. Albans, with only a few trains stopping during rush hours. At St. Albans, service was limited to four westbound trains in the morning between 7 a.m. and 9 a.m., and four eastbound trains in the evening between 5 p.m. and 6:45 p.m..

In 2023, the Metropolitan Transportation Authority announced plans to add an elevator to the St. Albans station to bring it in compliance with the Americans with Disabilities Act of 1990. The elevator opened in November 2025.

== Station layout ==
This station has one narrow six-car-long island platform between the two tracks with two entrances. The north staircase goes down to the south side of Linden Boulevard between Newburg and 180th Street while the south staircase goes down to a short tunnel leading to the dead-end street of Foch Boulevard.

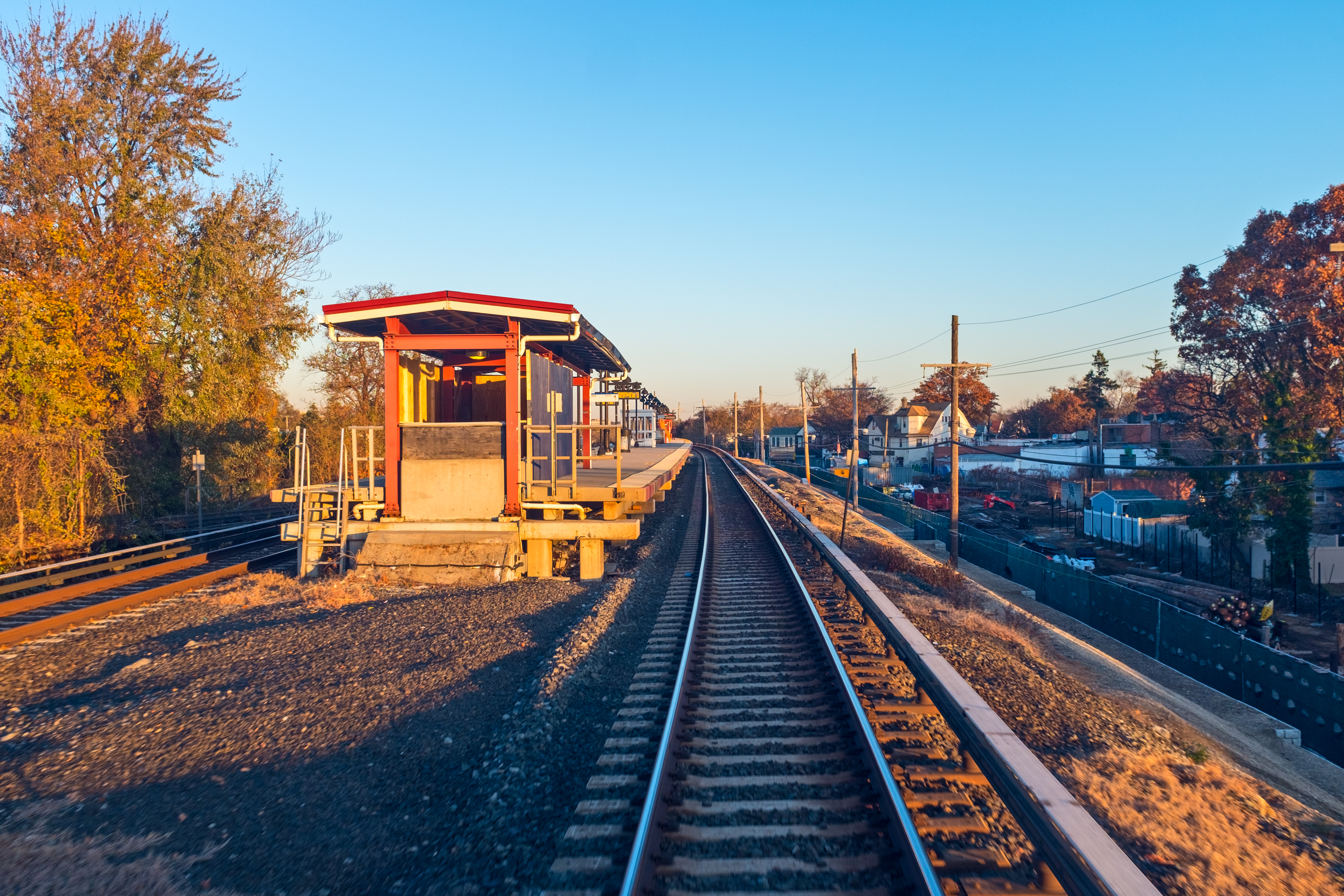
The station as seen from a train.

== Service ==
Service to the station is provided by hourly West Hempstead Branch trains.

== See also ==
- List of Long Island Rail Road stations
- St. James station (LIRR)
