= Far Rockaway–Lockwood's Grove station =

Train station in New York City (1872–77)

Far Rockaway–Lockwood's Grove

General information
- Location: Beach 21st Street; Far Rockaway, Queens, New York
- Coordinates: 40.602487°N 73.754715°W
- Line: Cedarhurst Cut-off

History
- Opened: May 14, 1872 (NY&RW)
- Closed: September 1877

Other services
Preceding station	Long Island Rail Road	Following station
Lawrence toward Rockaway Junction	New York and Rockaway Railroad	Terminus
Location

Far Rockaway–Lockwood's Grove is a former station on the Long Island Rail Road's Cedarhurst Cut-off that was located between Beach 21st Street and Beach 22nd Street in Far Rockaway, Queens. The old station house was located roughly between the present Wavecrest and Mott Avenue stations when the entire line was at grade.

== History ==
On or about July 1, 1871 – before the extension to Far Rockaway opened, the line was leased to the Long Island Railroad. Far Rockaway–Lockwood's Grove was opened by the New York and Rockaway Railroad on May 14, 1872 with the extension of the Cedarhurst Cut-off. The section of the Cedarhurst Cut-off between Far Rockaway and Lockwood's Grove was later known as "The Grove Track". The station closed in September 1877.

=== Station house ===
Lockwood's Grove's original station building was moved to Syosset station in 1877 after the station was abandoned. The building was renovated in 1944, but was torn down and replaced in 1948.

== See also ==
- History of the Long Island Rail Road
- Far Rockaway station (LIRR)
