= African Center for Community Empowerment =

US nonprofit organization

The African Center for Community Empowerment (ACCE) is a nonprofit, community-based organization serving youth and adults in Southeastern Queens, New York, US. The ACCE was founded in Far Rockaway, Queens in 2000 to help solve the poverty-related problems of inner-city youth and their families, and is currently in operation as an after-school program and community center in St. Albans, Queens.

The organization is the recipient of the 2005 Union Square Awards.
