= Atlantic Branch =

Long Island Rail Road branch

Overview
- Status: Operational
- Owner: Long Island Rail Road
- Locale: Western Long Island, New York, USA
- Termini: Atlantic Terminal; Valley Stream
- Stations: 8 passenger, 1 employee-only

Service
- Type: Commuter rail
- System: Long Island Rail Road
- Services: City Terminal Zone (Atlantic Shuttle) West Hempstead Branch Hempstead Branch (Peak Only) Babylon Branch (Peak Only)
- Operator: Metropolitan Transportation Authority

History
- Opened: 1836 (west of Jamaica); 1867 (east of Jamaica)

Technical
- Line length: 15.7 mi (25.3 km)
- Track gauge: 4 ft 8 1/2 in (1,435 mm) standard gauge
- Electrification: Third rail, 750 V DC

The Atlantic Branch is an electrified rail line owned and operated by the Long Island Rail Road in the U.S. state of New York. It is the only LIRR line with revenue passenger service in the borough of Brooklyn.

The line consists of two sections constructed separately. The portion of the line from Atlantic Terminal to Jamaica was constructed as part of the Brooklyn and Jamaica Railroad and opened in 1836, while the portion from Jamaica to Valley Stream was constructed as part of the South Side Railroad of Long Island in 1867.

== Description ==
Partly underground and partly elevated, the Atlantic Branch runs from Atlantic Terminal in Downtown Brooklyn to Valley Stream, in Nassau County, where it becomes the two-track Long Beach Branch with the two-track Far Rockaway Branch splitting southward just east of the Valley Stream station.

The section between Atlantic Terminal and Bedford Avenue is underground along Atlantic Avenue. From there the line is elevated above the median of Atlantic Avenue to Dewey Place (with a stop at Nostrand Avenue) before returning underground. At East New York the line rises to street level to cross above the north–south, freight-only Bay Ridge Branch, then descends underground once more. Between East New York and Jamaica, the closed but intact station at Woodhaven Junction is visible.

At 121st Street in Richmond Hill, Queens, the line rises to street level and passes the Morris Park Facility before joining the elevated Main Line at Jamaica. Immediately east of Jamaica, the line turns southeast, ducking beneath the eastward Main Line tracks. It curves parallel to the Montauk Branch after a few miles and continues next to it to Valley Interlocking in Valley Stream.

== History ==
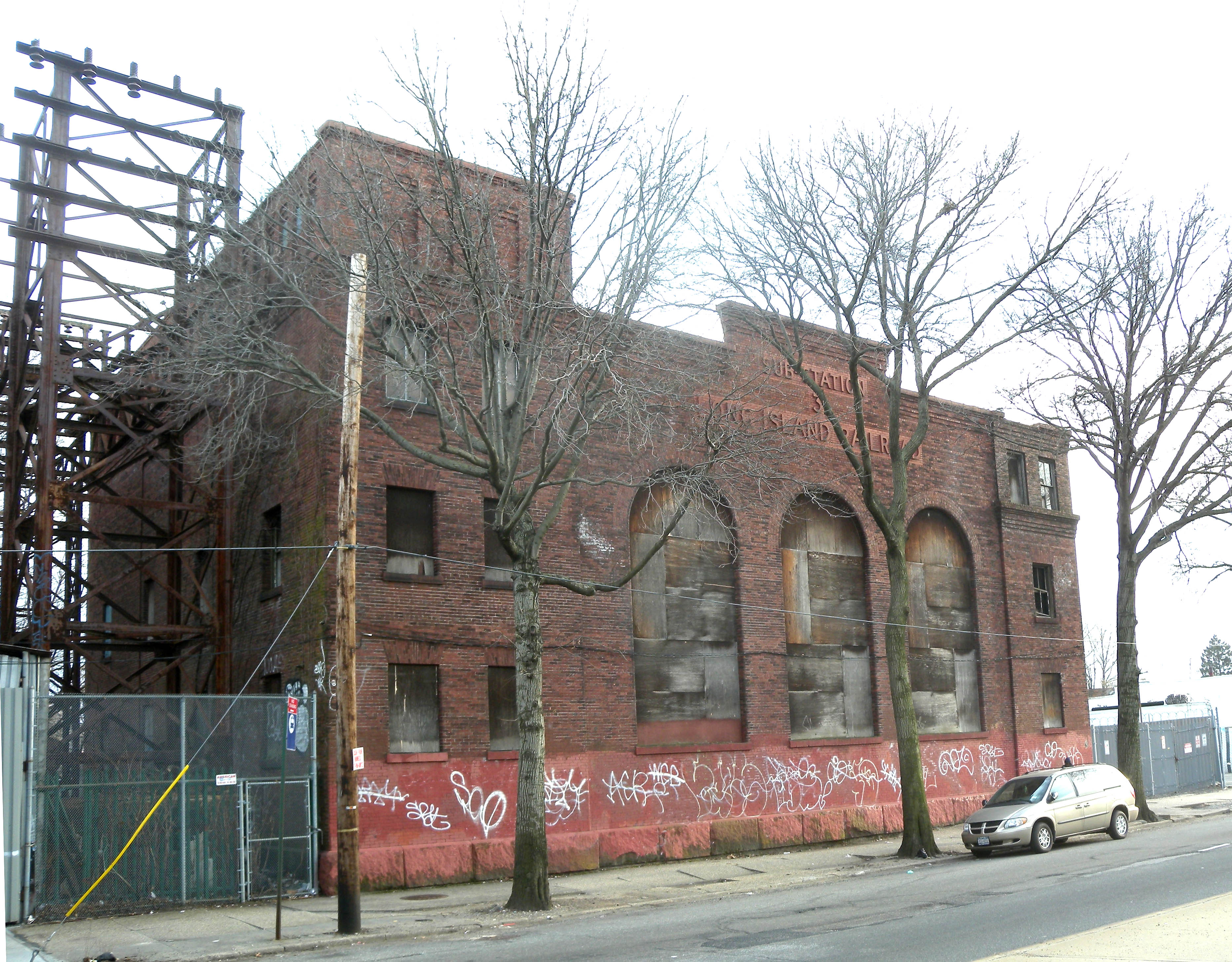
Woodhaven Junction power substation

The current Atlantic Branch is the successor to two separate lines: the Brooklyn and Jamaica Railroad (opened 1836) along Atlantic Avenue from Flatbush Avenue to Jamaica, and the South Side Railroad of Long Island (opened 1867) from Jamaica to Valley Stream.

=== Atlantic Terminal to Jamaica ===
The Brooklyn and Jamaica Railroad opened the line from South Ferry to what is now 151st Street in Jamaica on April 18, 1836. The line was leased to the Long Island Rail Road on December 1 that year. Upon the opening of the Hunter's Point terminal of the LIRR at Long Island City, all LIRR traffic was diverted to that terminal, and the Atlantic Avenue line, now owned solely by the Brooklyn Central and Jamaica Railroad, installed horse-drawn trains through Brooklyn (in response to a law banning steam in the city) and steam service from the city line to Jamaica. In 1867, the LIRR leased the line east of Classon Avenue, running its own steam service on this section. In 1876, the restriction of steam on Atlantic Avenue was lifted, and the line was leased east of Flatbush Avenue to the LIRR on June 1, 1877, with LIRR steam service beginning anew on June 28, 1877.

Initially the line turned halfway between Classon and Franklin Avenues, running halfway between Herkimer Street and Schuyler Street (now Atlantic Avenue) along the line of the present Herkimer Place. It turned slightly to the southeast near Howard Avenue, crossing the centerline of Schuyler Street about one-third of the way between Hopkinson Avenue (Thomas Boyland Street) and Paca Avenue (Rockaway Avenue). It crossed into the town of New Lots just beyond Stone Avenue (Mother Gaston Boulevard).

The Atlantic Branch was one of the first lines in the LIRR system slated to be electrified. In anticipation of this the entire line to Jamaica was to be grade separated. Between 1903 and 1905 the line was depressed into a tunnel from Flatbush Avenue to Bedford Avenue, then placed on an elevated viaduct from Bedford Avenue to Ralph Avenue then depressed back into a tunnel until Manhattan Crossing located just west of East New York station. At East New York the line returned to grade level then rose onto another elevated viaduct until Atkins Ave. The rest of the line from Atkins Ave to Morris Park located just west of Jamaica remained at grade level along Atlantic Avenue with numerous grade crossings with the anticipation of grade separating the line later on. Additionally a new terminal and yard was built at Flatbush and Atlantic Avenues. Electric service commenced in 1905 with the line consisting of two tracks between Flatbush Avenue and Woodhaven Junction and four tracks beyond that point to Jamaica.

LIRR then ran two services along the line: the traditional commuter type services from points on eastern Long Island to Flatbush Avenue, along with what was called the "local rapid transit" service, frequent elevated/subway like service at lower fare between Flatbush Ave and Queens Village. Although referred to as a rapid transit service, standard LIRR cars were used, and the service was operated by regular railroad rules. At this time the line from Jamaica to East New York had many more stations along Atlantic Avenue spaced at closer intervals, much like a rapid transit line. The four tracks between Jamaica and Woodhaven Junction lent itself to this service with the "rapid transit" trains using the outer two tracks while commuter trains used the inner two tracks.

In November 1925, 25 "local" trains left Brooklyn each weekday for Queens Village, 12 more ran to Hillside, and 16 more ran to Jamaica. All trains made all stops, 15 of them west of Queens Village. Fare was probably 10 cents for 13 miles Queens Village to Brooklyn, compared to about 40 cents on "express" LIRR trains making six or seven stops (but a monthly ticket good on any train was $7.10).

For a while the LIRR operated joint service along the Atlantic Branch with the Brooklyn Rapid Transit company (BRT) consisting of two connections, one with the Fifth Ave El at Flatbush Avenue, and another with the Broadway and Lexington Avenue els with a connection built at Chestnut Street in Brooklyn. This allowed BRT trains to access the Rockaways and Manhattan Beach, while affording the LIRR a connection into Manhattan to the BRT terminal located at Park Row over the Brooklyn Bridge (this service predated the opening of the East River Tunnels to Penn Station). Nevertheless, the Interstate Commerce Commission ended this service in 1916 when they classified different operating standards between rapid transit trains (such as BRT trains) and regular heavy rail railroads (such as the LIRR).

By the late 1930s, it was clear that the rest of the line needed to be grade separated. Much of the surrounding area along Atlantic Avenue in Ozone Park and Richmond Hill began their suburban development leading to more traffic along Atlantic Avenue which was plagued by the line's many grade crossings. The City of New York along with the LIRR thus allocated the funds to depress the rest of the line from Morris Park to East New York in a tunnel. Building of the tunnel commenced in 1939 (although plans to build the tunnel date back to 1893) with two of the line's four tracks being pulled out of service and the rapid transit service being discontinued.

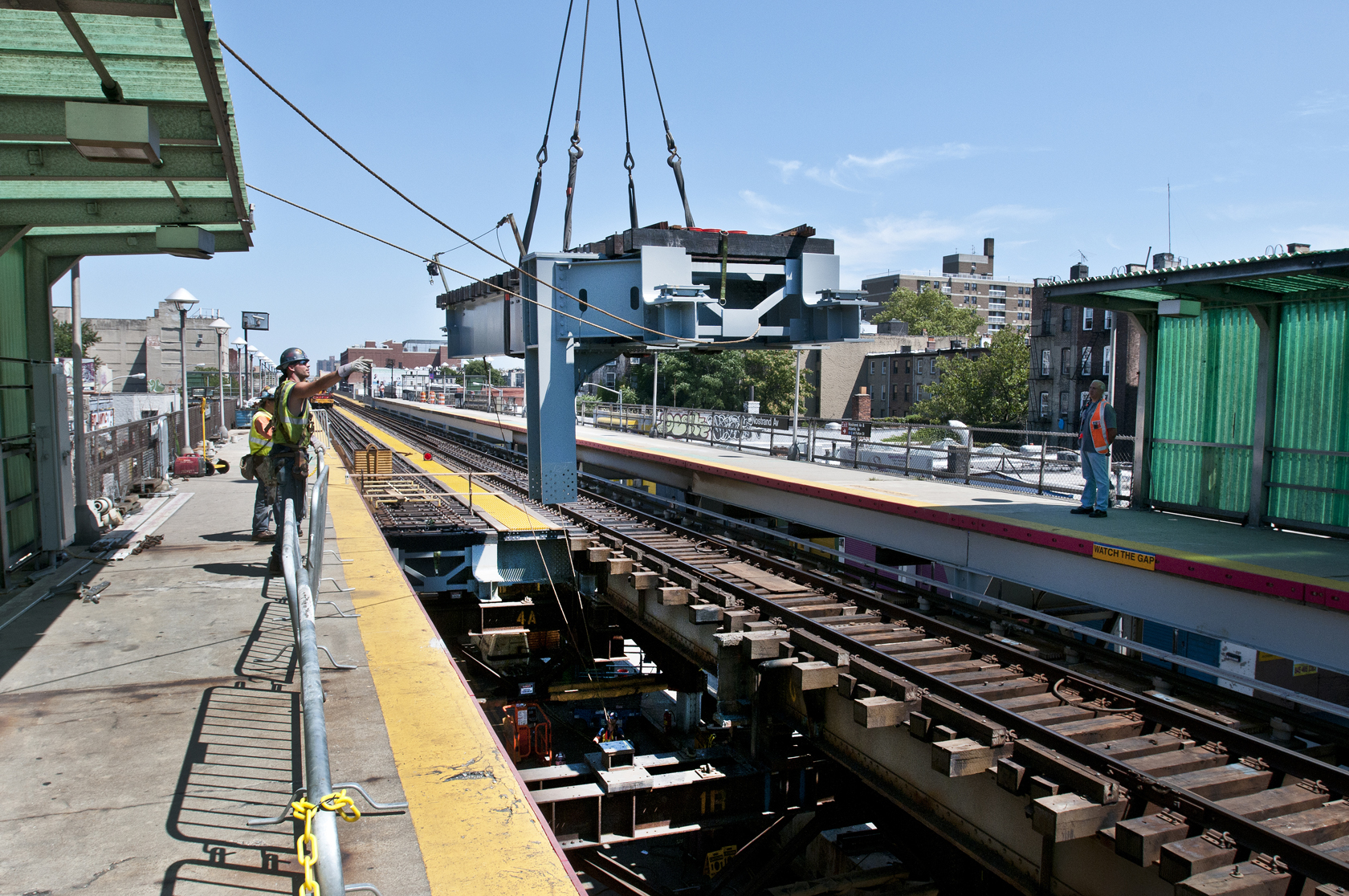
Replacement of the Atlantic Avenue viaduct at Nostrand Avenue in July 2011

On December 28, 1942, the tunnel was completed and opened with the two remaining at-grade tracks pulled out of service. Around this time Atlantic Avenue was raised over the East New York station via a viaduct that separated the road and the railroad. The elevated trestle from East New York to Atkins Avenue was also demolished as it had been included in the new tunnel to Jamaica. Only one station was included in the new tunnel: Woodhaven Junction, where the Atlantic Branch crossed under the Rockaway Beach Branch. An interlocking and track connection was built just west of the Woodhaven Junction station to connect the two lines, but these closed after the abandonment of the Rockaway Beach Branch between 1955 and 1962.

=== Jamaica to Valley Stream ===
The portion east of Jamaica was opened by the South Side Railroad of Long Island on October 28, 1867, as part of its initial line from Jamaica to Babylon. With the consolidation of the South Side into the Long Island Rail Road system in 1876, all passenger trains were rerouted to use the LIRR main line from Berlin Junction (west of Jamaica) to Rockaway Junction and the LIRR's Rockaway Branch to Springfield Junction, where it crossed the South Side. This change took effect June 25, 1876, and resulted in the closure of the South Side's Berlin, Beaver Street (Jamaica), Locust Avenue, and Springfield stations. This formed the current configuration, where the Montauk Branch follows this route, mostly ex-South Side, and the Atlantic Branch (then the Old Southern Road) uses the old South Side to Springfield Junction.

The line was soon reopened due to a lawsuit, but closed again by Austin Corbin as of January 6, 1881.

Effective May 17, 1906, when an electrified third track opened alongside the Montauk Division from Springfield Junction to Valley Stream, the Old Southern Road and this new track became part of the Atlantic Division.

Grade-crossing elimination work between Laurelton and Jamaica began in May 1958.

== Stations ==
East of Valley Stream, the Far Rockaway Branch continues to Far Rockaway and the Long Beach Branch continues to Long Beach.

As of February 27, 2023, the Atlantic Terminal, Nostrand Avenue, and East New York stations are primarily served by a shuttle running between Atlantic Terminal and Jamaica. These stations are also served by trains on the West Hempstead Branch, as well as a limited number of weekday trains on the Hempstead and Babylon branches. Other trains traveling east of Jamaica run to Penn Station, Grand Central Madison, or Long Island City.

Zone	Location	Services			Station	Miles (km)	Date opened	Date closed	Connections / notes
Zone	Location	AT	FR	LB	Station	Miles (km)	Date opened	Date closed	Connections / notes
1
1	Cobble Hill, Brooklyn				South Ferry		1836	1861	
1	Pacific Park, Brooklyn	●			Atlantic Terminal	0.0 (0.0)	1877		Long Island Rail Road: Atlantic Terminal shuttle, ■ West Hempstead Branch, ■ Babylon Branch (limited service), ■ Hempstead Branch (limited service); New York City Subway: (at Atlantic Avenue – Barclays Center); New York City Bus: B37, B41, B45, B63, B65, B67, B103; Originally named Flatbush Avenue
1	Prospect Heights, Brooklyn				Vanderbilt Avenue		1877	before 1890	
1	Prospect Heights, Brooklyn				Washington Avenue		c. 1878	before 1890	
1	Crown Heights, Brooklyn								
1	Crown Heights, Brooklyn				Grand Avenue		1877	c. 1878	
1	Crown Heights, Brooklyn				Bedford	1.2 (1.9)	c. 1842	c. 1900	Formerly Franklin Avenue; Connected to the Brooklyn, Flatbush and Coney Island Railway
1	Crown Heights, Brooklyn	●			Nostrand Avenue	1.6 (2.6)	1877		Long Island Rail Road: Atlantic Terminal shuttle, ■ West Hempstead Branch, ■ Babylon Branch (limited service), ■ Hempstead Branch (limited service); New York City Subway: (at Nostrand Avenue); New York City Bus: B25, B44, B44 SBS, B65, B49
1	Crown Heights, Brooklyn				Brooklyn Avenue		1877	before 1890	
1	Crown Heights, Brooklyn				Kingston Avenue				
1	Crown Heights, Brooklyn				Albany Avenue		1877	before 1890	
1	Crown Heights, Brooklyn				Troy Avenue	2.3 (3.7)	1877	c. 1899	
1	Crown Heights, Brooklyn				Schenectady Avenue		c. 1878	before 1890	
1	Crown Heights, Brooklyn				Utica Avenue	2.6 (4.2)	1877	c. 1899	
1	Crown Heights, Brooklyn				Rochester Avenue		1877	before 1890	
1	Crown Heights, Brooklyn				Ralph Avenue		1877	before 1890	
1	Brownsville, Brooklyn				Saratoga Avenue				
1	Brownsville, Brooklyn				Hopkinson Avenue		1877	c. 1878	
1	Brownsville, Brooklyn				Rockaway Avenue		c. 1878	before 1890	
1	East New York, Brooklyn								
1	East New York, Brooklyn				Stone Avenue		1877	c. 1878	
1	East New York, Brooklyn	●			East New York	4.0 (6.4)	c. 1848		Long Island Rail Road: Atlantic Terminal shuttle, ■ West Hempstead Branch, ■ Babylon Branch (limited service), ■ Hempstead Branch (limited service); New York City Subway: (at Atlantic Avenue), (at Broadway Junction); New York City Bus: B12, B20, B25, B83, Q24, Q56; Originally named Manhattan Beach Railroad Crossing
1	East New York, Brooklyn				Howard House	4.1 (6.6)	c. 1843	1905	Originally named East New York
1	East New York, Brooklyn				Pennsylvania Avenue				
1	East New York, Brooklyn				Wyckoff Avenue		c. 1878		
1	East New York, Brooklyn				Bradford Avenue		1899		
1	East New York, Brooklyn				Van Siclen Avenue		c. 1878		
1	East New York, Brooklyn				Warwick Street	4.9 (7.9)	1905	1939	
1	East New York, Brooklyn				Linwood Street	5.0 (8.0)	c. 1878	c. 1899	Originally named Van Wicklens
1	East New York, Brooklyn				Norwood Avenue	5.3 (8.5)	c. 1890	1915	
1	Cypress Hills, Brooklyn				Cypress Avenue		c. 1853	c. 1890	
1	Cypress Hills, Brooklyn				Cypress Hills		c. 1849		
1	Cypress Hills, Brooklyn				Autumn Avenue	5.8 (9.3)	1905	1939	Originally Railroad Avenue
1	Cypress Hills, Brooklyn				Adamsville		1872	1876	
1	Cypress Hills, Brooklyn				City Line				
1	Woodhaven, Queens				Unionville				
1	Woodhaven, Queens				Union Course	6.3 (10.1)	c. 1842	1939	
1	Woodhaven, Queens				Woodhaven	6.7 (10.8)	c. 1848	1939	Originally named Woodville
1	Woodhaven, Queens				Trotting Course Lane		1837	1842	
1	Woodhaven, Queens				Woodhaven Junction	7.2 (11.6)	c. 1890	1977	
1	Richmond Hill, Queens								
1	Richmond Hill, Queens				Chester Park				
1	Richmond Hill, Queens				Clarenceville	7.8 (12.6)	c. 1874	1939	
1	Richmond Hill, Queens				Lefferts Avenue		c. 1867	1870	
1	Richmond Hill, Queens				Morris Park	8.1 (13.0)	c. 1890	1939	
1	Richmond Hill, Queens				Morris Grove		1878	1886	
1	Richmond Hill, Queens	●			Boland's Landing	8.5 (13.7)	1889		Long Island Rail Road: Atlantic Terminal shuttle Employee-only station to serve the Morris Park Facility
1	Richmond Hill, Queens				Berlin				
1	Richmond Hill, Queens				Berlin Junction				
1	Richmond Hill, Queens				Dunton	8.9 (14.3)	1869	1939	Originally named Berlin, then Van Wyck Avenue
3	Jamaica, Queens	●	●	●	Jamaica	9.3 (15.0)	1836		Long Island Rail Road: Atlantic Terminal shuttle, ■ Babylon Branch, ■ Hempstead Branch, ■ Montauk Branch, ■ Oyster Bay Branch, ■ Port Jefferson Branch, ■ Ronkonkoma Branch, ■ West Hempstead Branch; New York City Subway: (at Sutphin Boulevard–Archer Avenue–JFK Airport); New York City Bus: Q1, Q20, Q24, Q30, Q31, Q43, Q44 SBS, Q54, Q56, Q75; MTA Bus: Q6, Q8, Q9, Q25, Q40, Q41, Q60, Q65; Nassau Inter-County Express: n4 AirTrain JFK: ■ Jamaica Train
3	Jamaica, Queens				Beaver Street	9.6 (15.4)	1867	1913	Also known as Jamaica—Beaver Street
3	Jamaica, Queens				South Street		1917	1922	
3	South Jamaica, Queens				Cedar Manor	10.8 (17.4)	1906	1959	Originally named Power Place
3	Locust Manor, Queens		●	●^{†}	Locust Manor	12.2 (19.6)	1869		New York City Bus: Q3, Q85, Q89, QM21, QM65; Originally named Locust Avenue † Served by ■ Far Rockaway Branch weekdays, ■ Long Beach Branch weekends
3	Springfield Gardens, Queens				Higbie Avenue	12.6 (20.3)	1908	1960	Originally named Springfield
3	Springfield Gardens, Queens				Springfield		1867	1906	
3	Laurelton, Queens		●	●^{†}	Laurelton	13.1 (21.1)	1907		New York City Bus: Q77, Q85, Q89; Originally named Central Avenue † Served by ■ Far Rockaway Branch weekdays, ■ Long Beach Branch weekends
3	Rosedale, Queens		●	●^{†}	Rosedale	14.0 (22.5)			New York City Bus: Q5, Q85, Q86, Q89, QM63; Originally named Foster's Meadow † Served by ■ Far Rockaway Branch weekdays, ■ Long Beach Branch weekends
4	Valley Stream		●	●	Valley Stream	15.7 (25.3)	1869		Long Island Rail Road: ■ West Hempstead Branch; Nassau Inter-County Express: n1, Elmont Flexi

== See also ==
- Lower Manhattan-Jamaica/JFK Transportation Project – A defunct proposal to use the LIRR Atlantic Branch in a new direct JFK connection to Lower Manhattan
