= Grand Central Parkway =

Highway in New York

Grand Central Parkway
- Map of New York City with Grand Central Parkway highlighted in red

Route information
- Maintained by NYSDOT
- Length: 14.61 mi (23.51 km)
- Existed: 1933–present
- Component highways: NY 907M (unsigned) entire length I-278 in Astoria
- Restrictions: No commercial vehicles east of exit 4

Major junctions
- West end: I-278 Toll in Astoria
- I-278 in Astoria: NY 25A / I-678 in Corona; I-495 in Flushing Meadows Park; I-678 / Jackie Robinson Parkway in Kew Gardens Hills; I-295 / NY 24 / NY 25 in Cunningham Park; Cross Island Parkway in Glen Oaks
- East end: Northern State Parkway at the Little Neck–Lake Success line

Location
- Country: United States
- State: New York
- Counties: Queens

Highway system
- New York Highways; Interstate; US; State; Reference; Parkways

The Grand Central Parkway (GCP) is a 14.61-mile (23.51 km) controlled-access parkway that stretches from the Triborough Bridge in New York City to the Queens–Nassau County line on Long Island. At the Nassau County line, it becomes the Northern State Parkway, which runs across the northern part of Long Island into Suffolk County, where it ends in Hauppauge. The westernmost stretch (from the RFK Bridge to the BQE) also carries a short stretch of Interstate 278 (I-278). The parkway runs through Queens and passes the Cross Island Parkway, Long Island Expressway, LaGuardia Airport and Citi Field, home of the New York Mets. The parkway is designated New York State Route 907M (NY 907M), an unsigned reference route. Despite its name, the Grand Central Parkway was not named after Grand Central Terminal.

== Route description ==
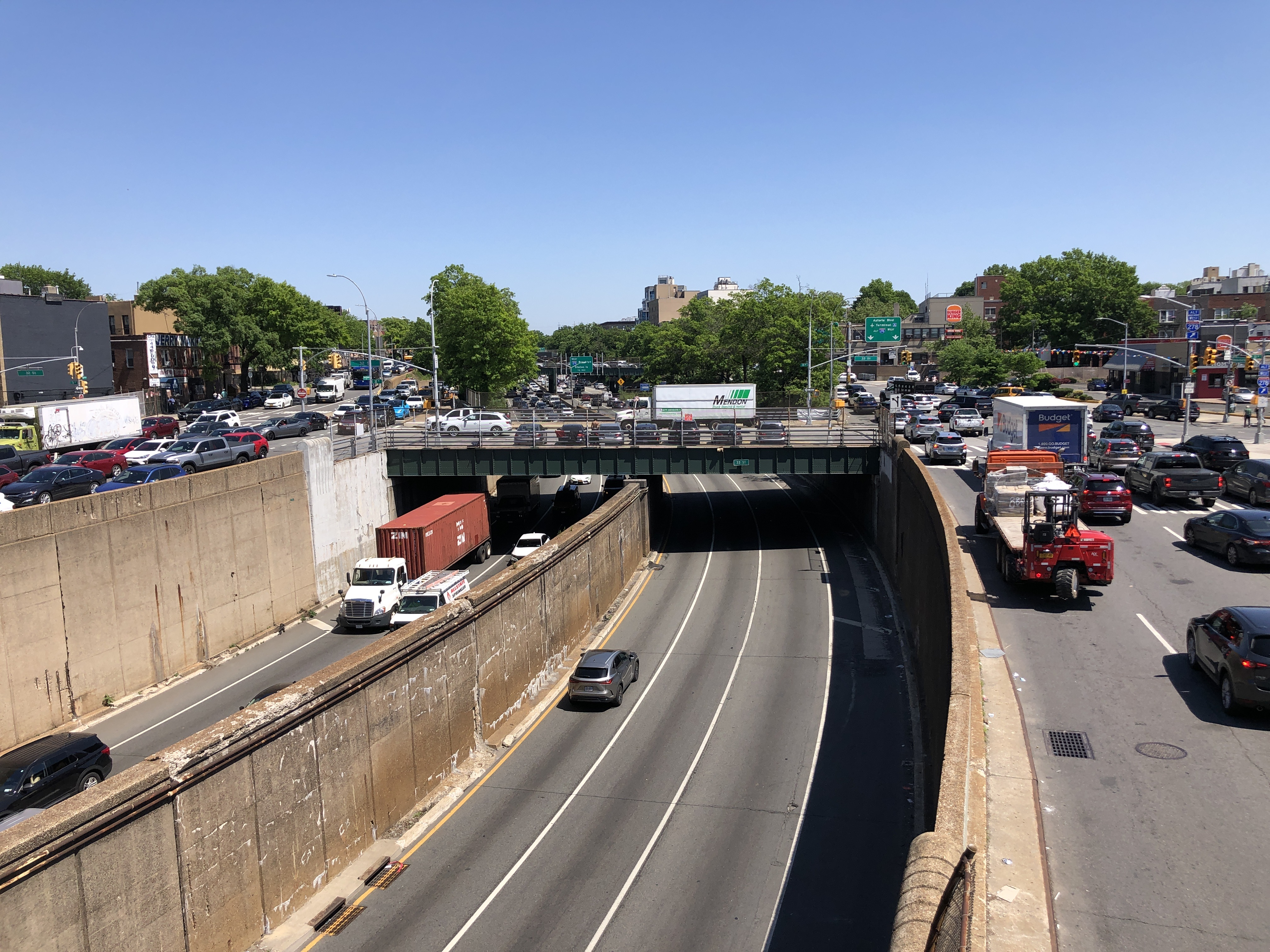
The western end of the Grand Central Parkway concurrent with I-278 in Astoria

The Grand Central Parkway begins at the Robert F. Kennedy Bridge overlapped with I-278 in the Astoria section of Queens. After an interchange with 31st Street (I-278 exit 45); the parkway runs concurrently with I-278 for 0.80 mi (1.29 km) before the latter splits off onto the Brooklyn–Queens Expressway at exit 4, where all commercial traffic must exit. This concurrency is one of the few places in the parkway system where truck traffic is allowed to any extent—all trucks under 14 feet (4.3 m) high may drive on it.

The parkway proceeds east past St. Michaels Cemetery, entering exit 5, which serves 82nd Street and Astoria Boulevard in East Elmhurst, also connecting to the Marine Air Terminal and Terminal A of LaGuardia Airport. After crossing over 82nd Street and Ditmars Boulevard, the parkway enters the airport area, passing south of runway 4-22. During the reconstruction of the LaGuardia terminals, construction has been heavy in the vicinity of exits 6 and 7. As currently configured, eastbound exit 6 is an interchange with 94th Street while exit 7 forks northward on a ramp to the airport's terminals B, C and D. On the westbound side, exit 7 provides access to terminals C and D while exit 6 serves terminal B (in addition to 94th Street). After exit 7, the Grand Central bends southeast and away from LaGuardia Airport, paralleling the Long Island Sound into the eastbound only exit 8, which serves 111th Street.

Entering the Corona section of Queens, the Grand Central enters exit 9, which serves NY 25A (Northern Boulevard) and the Whitestone Expressway just west of Citi Field. The Grand Central then proceeds south, crossing under the Long Island Rail Road's Port Washington Branch and soon into Flushing Meadows-Corona Park. Through the park, the parkway passes west of Arthur Ashe Stadium, the Queens Zoo and the Unisphere before entering exit 10, a cloverleaf interchange with the Long Island Expressway (I-495). Soon crossing into Forest Hills, the parkway continues through Flushing Meadows-Corona Park, passing Meadow Lake, entering exit 11, connecting to 69th Road and Jewel Avenue in [in Forest Hills]. After that interchange, the parkway bends southeast through Forest Hills, passing Willow Lake and exit 12, which connects to NY 25 (Queens Boulevard) via 78th Avenue.

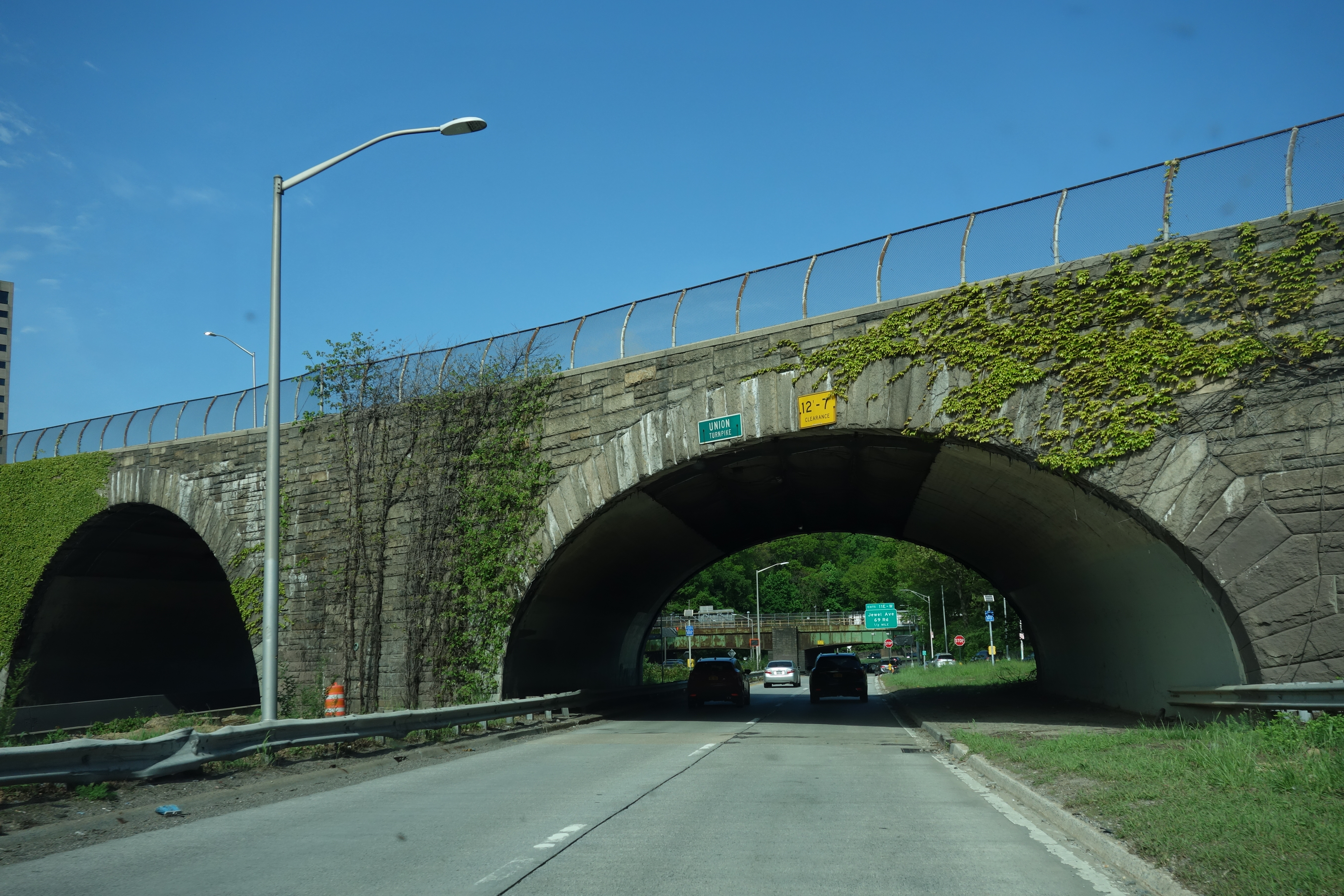
Passing under Union Turnpike

The Grand Central continues its bend, now proceeding eastward over Jamaica Yard, entering the Kew Gardens Interchange (exits 13, 14 and 15), connecting I-678 (the Van Wyck Expressway), Union Turnpike and the Jackie Robinson Parkway in Kew Gardens. After the Kew Gardens Interchange, the Grand Central Parkway continues east into the Briarwood section of Queens, where exit 16 connects to Parsons Boulevard via a service road. After crossing through the developed neighborhood of Briarwood, the parkway enters Jamaica Hills, passing south of Queens Hospital near 164th Street. Proceeding westbound, an exit (exit 17) is present, connecting to 168th Street, while eastbound, exit 18 connects the Grand Central to Utopia Parkway. At the interchange with Utopia Parkway, the Grand Central passes south of St. John's University, soon winding northeast into exit 19, which serves 188th Street in Jamaica Estates. After exit 19, the parkway winds eastward into Cunningham Park, where it enters exit 20, which serves Francis Lewis Boulevard and exit 21, which connects to the Clearview Expressway (I-295) and its southern terminus. The parkway leaves Cunningham Park, entering the Bellerose section of Queens, entering exit 22, which connects to Union Turnpike via Stronghurst Avenue. The route then enters Alley Pond Park, where it interchanges with the Cross Island Parkway and Winchester Boulevard. After the interchange, the Grand Central passes west of Creedmoor Hospital, winding northeast into exit 24, which serves Little Neck Parkway before winding northeast to the Nassau County line in Little Neck. At this crossing, the parkway changes names to the Northern State Parkway, which continues east towards Hauppauge.

== History ==
The Grand Central Parkway was first proposed in 1922, as a scenic drive along the high ground of east-central Queens. By the time construction began in 1931, it had been reconceived as extending northwestward to the Triborough Bridge, then in the planning stages, and connecting on the east with the Northern State Parkway, also in the planning stages, thereby among other things providing an easier route from the bridge to Jones Beach. The parkway was widened in 1961 in preparation for the 1964 New York World's Fair in Flushing Meadows–Corona Park.

In 2010 construction began at Kew Gardens Interchange to improve traffic congestion. Formerly, the frontage road of the Grand Central between BQE and the RFK Bridge served as a truck route, since large trucks were not permitted on the parkway. Exemptions were provided for smaller trucks that conform with strict regulations on the section of the Grand Central that overlapped with I-278. In December 2017, the state concluded a $2.5 million project that lowered the roadbed of the section of the parkway that is concurrent with I-278. This section of I-278 now has a 14-foot (4.3 m) vertical clearance, which allows most trucks to stay on I-278.

== Exit list ==
County	Location	mi	km	Exit	Destinations	Notes
Queens	Astoria	0.00	0.00	–	I-278 Toll east (RFK Bridge) – Manhattan, Bronx, Randalls Island	Continuation east; western end of I-278 concurrency
Queens	Astoria	0.00	0.00	45	31st Street / Astoria Boulevard	No westbound access to Astoria Boulevard; last westbound exit before toll
Queens	Astoria	0.80	1.29	4	I-278 west (Brooklyn–Queens Expressway) – Brooklyn, Staten Island	Eastern end of I-278 concurrency; eastbound exit and westbound entrance; all trucks must exit; exit number not signed
Queens	East Elmhurst	1.34	2.16	4	To I-278 west (Brooklyn–Queens Expressway) – Brooklyn, Staten Island	Westbound exit and eastbound entrance
Queens	East Elmhurst	1.34	2.16	5	Astoria Boulevard / 82nd Street – Terminal A	
Queens	East Elmhurst	2.26	3.64	6	94th Street – Terminal B Parking	No westbound exit
Queens	East Elmhurst	2.51	4.04	7	LaGuardia Airport – Terminals B and C	
Queens	East Elmhurst	3.55	5.71	8	111th Street	Eastbound exit only
Queens	Corona	3.79	6.10	9	NY 25A (Northern Boulevard) / Whitestone Expressway north to I-678	Signed as exits 9W (NY 25A west) and 9E (NY 25A east/Whitestone); no eastbound access to NY 25A west; exits 13B-C on Whitestone Expy.
Queens	Flushing Meadows–Corona Park	4.39	7.07	9P	Flushing Meadows–Corona Park, BJK Tennis Center	Access via Shea Road; no eastbound exit
Queens	Flushing Meadows–Corona Park	5.10	8.21	10	I-495 (Long Island Expressway) – Manhattan, Eastern Long Island	Signed as exits 10W (west) and 10E (east); exits 22A-B on I-495
Queens	Flushing Meadows–Corona Park	5.94	9.56	11	69th Road / Jewel Avenue	Signed as exits 11W (west) and 11E (east) westbound
Queens	Flushing Meadows–Corona Park	6.50	10.46	12	To NY 25 (Queens Boulevard) / 78th Avenue	Eastbound exit only
Queens	Kew Gardens Hills	7.19	11.57	13	I-678 south (Van Wyck Expressway) – Kennedy Airport	Eastbound exit and westbound entrance; exit 10 on I-678
Queens	Kew Gardens Hills	7.53	12.12	14	Jackie Robinson Parkway west / Union Turnpike to NY 25 west (Queens Boulevard) – Brooklyn	Signed as exits 14 (Parkway) and 15 (Union) westbound; no westbound access to Union Turnpike east; NY 25 not signed eastbound
Queens	Briarwood	8.11	13.05	16	Parsons Boulevard / 164th Street	Eastbound exit only
Queens	Jamaica Hills–Hillcrest line	8.64	13.90	17	Parsons Boulevard / 168th Street to I-678 south (Van Wyck Expressway)	Westbound exit only
Queens	Jamaica Hills–Hillcrest line	9.13	14.69	18	Utopia Parkway	No westbound exit
Queens	Jamaica Estates–Holliswood line	9.83	15.82	19	188th Street	
Queens	Cunningham Park	10.57– 10.86	17.01– 17.48	20	Francis Lewis Boulevard	Signed as exits 20A (north) and 20B (south)
Queens	Cunningham Park	11.10	17.86	21	I-295 north (Clearview Expressway) / NY 24 east / NY 25 (Hillside Avenue) to I-495 – Bronx	NYC's only stack interchange; NY 24 not signed; exit 1 on I-295
Queens	Bellerose	11.93	19.20	22	Union Turnpike	Eastbound exit and westbound entrance; former NY 25C
Queens	Glen Oaks	12.56	20.21	23	Cross Island Parkway / Winchester Boulevard to I-495 / Union Turnpike	No westbound access to Winchester Boulevard; no eastbound access to Union Turnpike; exits 29E-W on Cross Island Parkway
Queens	Little Neck	13.67	22.00	24	Little Neck Parkway	
Queens–Nassau county line	Little Neck–Lake Success line	14.61	23.51	–	Northern State Parkway east – Eastern Long Island	Continuation east
1.000 mi = 1.609 km; 1.000 km = 0.621 mi: Concurrency terminus; Electronic toll collection; Incomplete access
