= Queens Community Board 8 =

Queens Community District 8 Queens Community Board 8
- Community District
- Country: United States
- State: New York
- City: New York City
- Borough: Queens
- Neighborhoods: list: Briarwood; South Flushing; Fresh Meadows; Holliswood; Jamaica Estates; Jamaica Hills; Kew Gardens Hills

Government
  - Type: Community board
  - Body: Queens Community Board 8
  - Chairperson: Martha Taylor
  - District Manager: Marie Adam-Ovide

Area
  - Total: 7.4 sq mi (19 km^{2})

Population (2010)
  - Total: 151,107
  - Density: 20,000/sq mi (7,900/km^{2})

Ethnicity
  - African-American: 11.5%
  - Asian: 34.3%
  - Hispanic and Latino Americans: 19.2%
  - White: 30.6%
  - Others: 4.4%
- Time zone: UTC−5 (Eastern)
  - Summer (DST): UTC−4 (EDT)
- ZIP codes: 11366, 11367, 11423, 11432, 11435, and 11427
- Area codes: 718, 347, and 929, and 917
- Police Precincts: 107th (website)
- Website: www1.nyc.gov/site/queenscb8/index.page

The Queens Community Board 8 is a local government in the New York City borough of Queens, encompassing the neighborhoods of Briarwood, Cunningham Heights, Flushing South, Fresh Meadows, Hillcrest, Hilltop Village, Holliswood, Jamaica Estates, Jamaica Hills, Kew Gardens Hills, Pomonok, and Utopia. It is delimited by the Long Island Expressway to Hillside Avenue and from the Van Wyck Expressway to the Clearview Expressway.
