= Jamaica Hills, Queens =

Neighborhood in New York City

Coordinates: 40°42′46″N 73°47′57″W

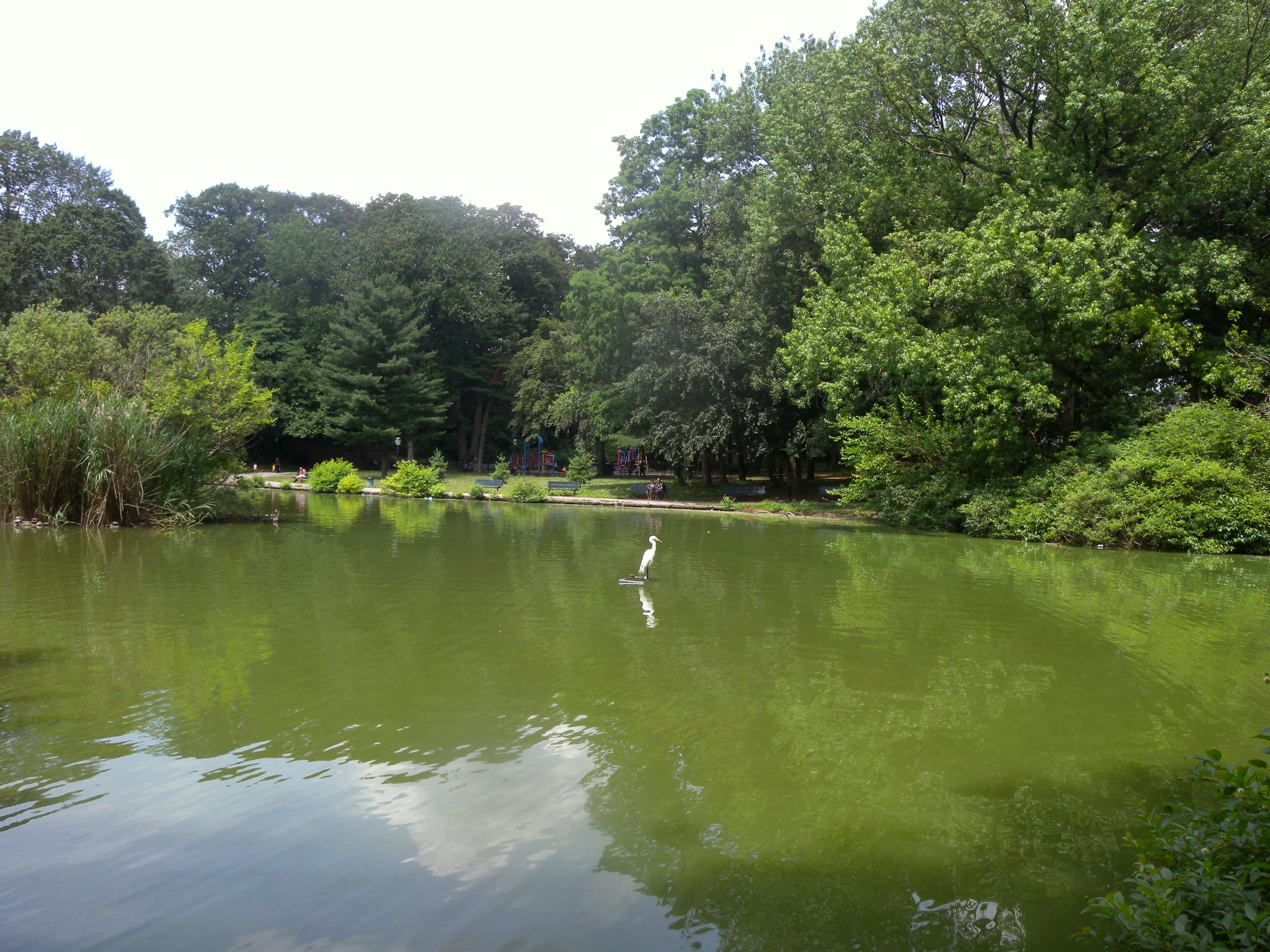
Captain Tilly Park

A map of Jamaica Hills

Jamaica Hills is a small middle class neighborhood in the New York City borough of Queens.

== Geography ==
The neighborhood is surrounded by Hillcrest (at the Grand Central Parkway to the north), Jamaica Estates (at Homelawn Street, a continuation of Utopia Parkway, to the east), Jamaica (at Hillside Avenue to the south), and Briarwood (at Parsons Boulevard to the west). It is centered on the terminal moraine that runs the length of Long Island.

== Local culture ==
Originally populated with people who left neighborhoods under ethnic transition, Jamaica Hills started to become more ethnically diverse after 1964. The population today is very mixed with a large South Asian population and smaller populations from the Caribbean, Central America, and China. Because of the opening of a Greek Orthodox church in the 1960s, many Greek immigrants live in the area. Jamaica Hills is patrolled by the New York City Police Department's 107th Precinct.
