= Fresh Meadows, Queens =

Neighborhood in New York City

Fresh Meadows
- Neighborhood of Queens
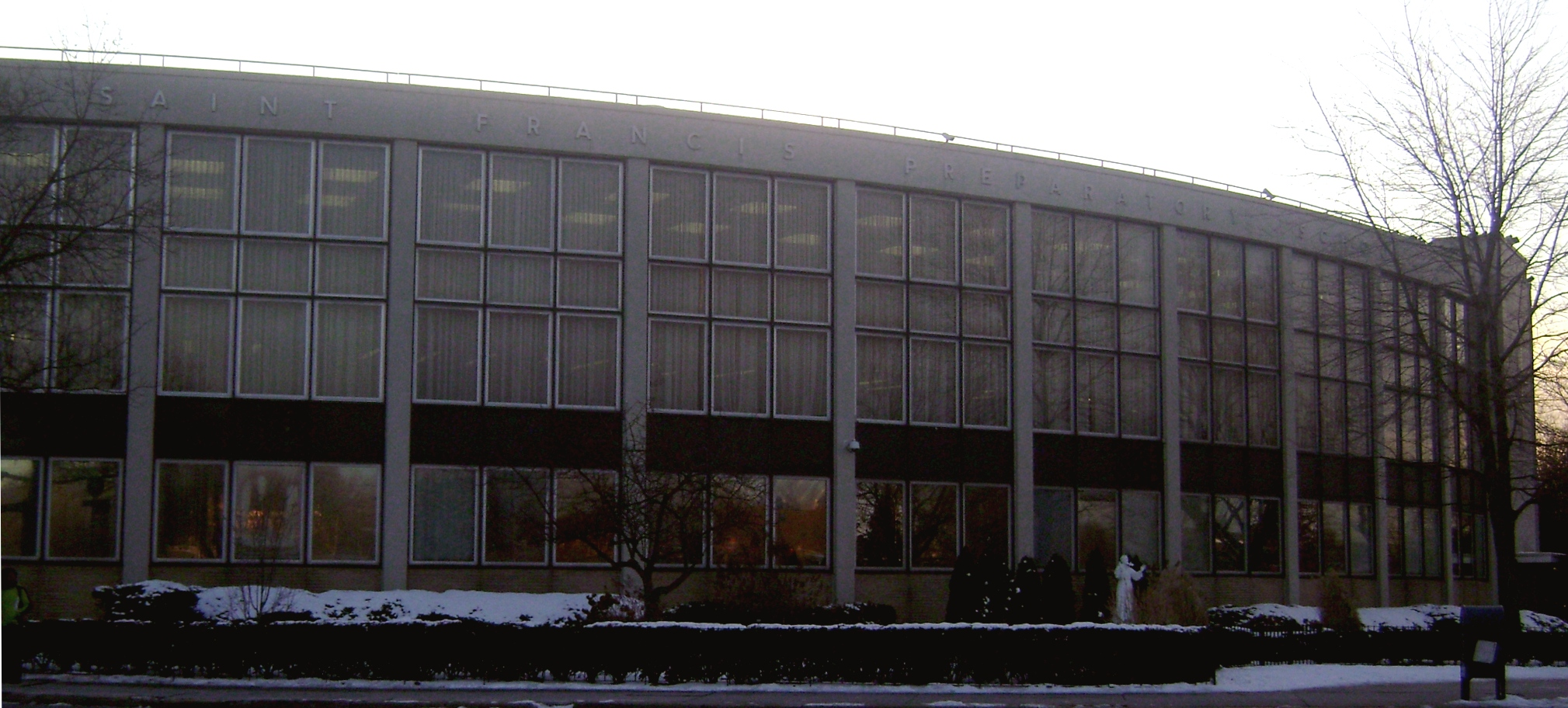
- St. Francis Preparatory School
- Interactive map of Fresh Meadows
- Coordinates: 40.735°N 73.78°W
- Country: United States
- State: New York
- City: New York City
- County/Borough: Queens
- Community District: Queens 8

Population
  - Estimate (2010): 17,812
- Based on 2010 U.S. Census figures; excludes Hillcrest

Ethnicity
  - Asian: 47.1%
  - White: 32.9%
  - Hispanic: 9.9%
  - Black: 7.6%
  - Other/Multiracial: 2.5%

Economics
  - Median income: $64,005
- Time zone: UTC−5 (EST)
  - Summer (DST): UTC−4 (EDT)
- ZIP Codes: 11365, 11366
- Area codes: 718, 347, 929, and 917

Fresh Meadows is a neighborhood in the northeastern section of the New York City borough of Queens. Fresh Meadows was formerly part of the broader town of Flushing and is bordered to the north by the Horace Harding Expressway and Auburndale; to the west by Pomonok, St. John's University, Hillcrest, and Utopia; to the east by Cunningham Park and the Clearview Expressway; and to the south by the Grand Central Parkway.

Fresh Meadows is located in Queens Community District 8 and its ZIP Codes are 11365 and 11366. It is patrolled by the New York City Police Department's 107th Precinct. Politically, Fresh Meadows is represented by the New York City Council's 23rd and 24th Districts.

== History ==
=== Early history ===
The name "Fresh Meadows" dates back to before the American Revolution. Fresh Meadows was part of the Town of Flushing, which had large areas of sal meadows, such as the original "Flushing Meadows". The wetlands in the hilly ground south and east of the village of Flushing, however, were fed by freshwater springs, and thus were "fresh meadows". Fresh Meadows Road (which today follows the same route under a number of names, including Fresh Meadow Lane and part of Utopia Parkway) traversed the area, and served as the route from the landing place at Whitestone to the village of Jamaica. In The Evening Post in 1805, farm owner James Smith advertised the sale of his 60-acre farm "on the road to Fresh Meadows and Flushing".

During the American Revolution, British troops marched through the area. General Benedict Arnold and his troops stayed at farms along the way. General Arnold drilled his troops in the area, on the current location of M.S. 216. In order to help move military supplies from British ships using the Whitestone Landing, a new road was built to connect the Fresh Meadows Road with Hempstead. This road began at what is now the intersection of Utopia Parkway and 73rd Avenue, near a local landmark along the Fresh Meadows Road: the remnants of a large tree that had burned after being struck by lightning that was known as the "Black Stump". The road took its name from this feature, and was called "Black Stump Road".

During the 19th century, a farming community known as Black Stump developed in the area. The Black Stump School was built before 1871. The school was expanded in 1900 and a second story was added in 1905. The remains of the Black Stump School were demolished in 1941 in order to build present-day Utopia Playground, located at 73rd Avenue and Utopia Parkway.

For several years, the woods of Black Stump were rumored to be haunted because people heard strange sounds coming from the woods. In 1908, the mysterious sounds were discovered to be coming from a recluse who lived in a small hut and sang Irish folk songs at night.

=== Parsons Nurseries and Kissena Park ===
In 1868, Samuel Parsons opened Parsons Nurseries, one of the earliest commercial gardens, near what is now Fresh Meadows Lane. With help of a team of collectors, Parsons Nurseries found exotic trees and shrubs to import into the United States, and its advertisements filled gardening magazines with depictions of these exotic plants. During the late 1880s, Parsons Nurseries was importing 10,000 Japanese maples into the United States each year with help from Swiss immigrant John R. Trumpy. Parsons Nurseries also was the first to introduce the California privet in the United States from Japan. Samuel Parsons' children, Samuel Bowne Parsons and Robert Bowne Parsons, later took over running the nursery. In 1886, Samuel Bowne Parsons helped renew the plantations of Central Park while serving as Superintendent of Parks.

Samuel Bowne Parsons gave the lake on his property the name "kissena", which he thought was the Chippewa word for "it is cold". Kissena Lake was initially used as a mill pond. Parsons later used the lake for ice cutting, where surface ice from lakes and rivers is collected and stored in ice houses and use or sale as a cooling method before mechanical refrigeration was available. The lake was also a habitat for wood duck through the 1900s. Just east of the lake was a water pumping station.

By 1898, Samuel Bowne Parsons' son, George H. Parsons, had taken over as superintendent of Parsons Nurseries. Later that year, George was found in the lavatory by his father; he had died of heart failure. Parsons Nurseries closed in 1901, and Samuel Bowne Parsons died in 1906. Two real estate developers, John W. Paris and Edward McDougal, bought most of the Parsons land, then built large houses as part of the "Kissena Park" residential development. New York City bought the rest of the Parsons land and a few other land parcels to create Kissena Park. A 14-acre (5.7 ha) tract of Parsons' exotic specimens was preserved in the modern-day park and is now the Historic Grove.

=== Fresh Meadow Country Club ===
In 1921, Park Slope resident Benjamin C. Ribman and others from the Unity Club of Brooklyn were looking to build a golf course. The group chose the intersection of Fresh Meadow Lane and Nassau Boulevard as the site, because the land was suitable for golf and roads provided accessibility to other parts of the city. The 106 acres of land were purchased in late 1921, and another 26 acres were purchased the next year. A. W. Tillinghast designed the golf course.

Originally, the name was to be the Woodland. After the Brooklyn Daily Eagle realized that there was already a golf course name Woodland in Boston, the founders decided to name the course Fresh Meadow Country Club. The name came from an area northeast of Flushing even though the golf course was actually located southeast of Flushing, just south of what is presently the Long Island Expressway near 183rd Street.

Fresh Meadow Country Club opened on May 30, 1922. At the golf course's dedication, the first round of golf was played by former NCAA golf champion Jesse Sweetser and club professional Willie Anderson. Sweetser won by two strokes. People in attendance included New York State Supreme Court Justices Mitchell May, Edward Lazansky, and Harry Lewis, and Borough President Maurice E. Connolly.

The clubhouse opened on September 8, 1923. Nine days later, the clubhouse burned to the ground from an explosion of a boiler. Firefighters from Flushing, Bayside, and Black Stump arrived but they were unable to save the clubhouse, in part because the nearest fire hydrant was a half-mile away, but they were able to stop the fire before it consumed an adjoining locker building and a two-story dormitory building.

The PGA Championship was held at Fresh Meadow Country Club in 1930, and the U.S. Open in 1932. In 1937, the golf course hosted a charity game between John Montague, Babe Ruth, Babe Didrikson, and Sylvania Annenberg, a game that was watched by 10,000 fans, some of whom rushed the golf course and left Babe Ruth's shirt in tatters.

=== Holliswood Homes ===
Around 1939, Paul Roth bought 27 acres (11 ha) of land that had been part of the Klein farm and the Boggs farm. The land was bounded by 73rd Avenue, 185th Street, Union Turnpike, and 188th Street. The 204 homes were designed by architect Arthur E. Allen. Roth named the community Holliswood Homes. Houses were sold for an average of $7,400 each. Roth had previously developed areas elsewhere in Queens, Brooklyn, and Long Island.

=== Fresh Meadows housing and retail development ===
In February 1946, the golf course's land was sold to New York Life Insurance Company for $1,075,000, equivalent to $17,700,000 in 2025, in order to build a housing complex on the land. The Gross-Morton Company had also made an offer to buy the land, but it was not accepted. The New York Life Insurance Company chose Ralph Thomas Walker as the chief designer, and it signed a contract with the George A. Fuller Company, which had built the Flat Iron Building, to construct the apartment buildings. Construction cost the New York Life Insurance Company $35 million (equivalent to $578 million in 2025)).

New York Life Insurance Company donated land on 69th Avenue at 195th Street to the city so it could build a school. In 1947, the New York City Board of Education awarded contracts of over $1.8 million (equivalent to $26 million in 2025) to construct P.S. 26, an elementary school with a capacity of 1,494 students. On April 21, 1947, ground was broken for the school's construction. The school, P.S. 26, also known as the Rufus King School, opened in February 1949. P.S. 173 opened soon afterwards, in September 1949, at 69th Avenue and Fresh Meadows Lane. P.S. 173 was originally supposed to be built on the site of Utopia Playground one block west, but the school had been relocated due to opposition from Robert Moses, the New York City parks commissioner.

The first twenty families moved into the Fresh Meadows Housing Development on September 2, 1947. As a result of housing segregation, New York Life Insurance Company did not allow black individuals to live in the Fresh Meadows Housing Development. It was also built to house local World War II veterans. The complex and its eponymous shopping center were among the first in the United States designed primarily to accommodate automobile traffic rather than pedestrian traffic. Apartment rents were between $74 and $108 per month, which included gas and electricity. In 1949, architectural critic Lewis Mumford described the Fresh Meadows housing complex as "perhaps the most positive and exhilarating example of large-scale community planning in this country". The construction of the final residential building, a 20-story apartment building at 67th Avenue and 192nd Street, was completed and ready for occupancy in May 1962. At the time the building's construction ended, 11,000 people were living in the Fresh Meadows Housing Development.

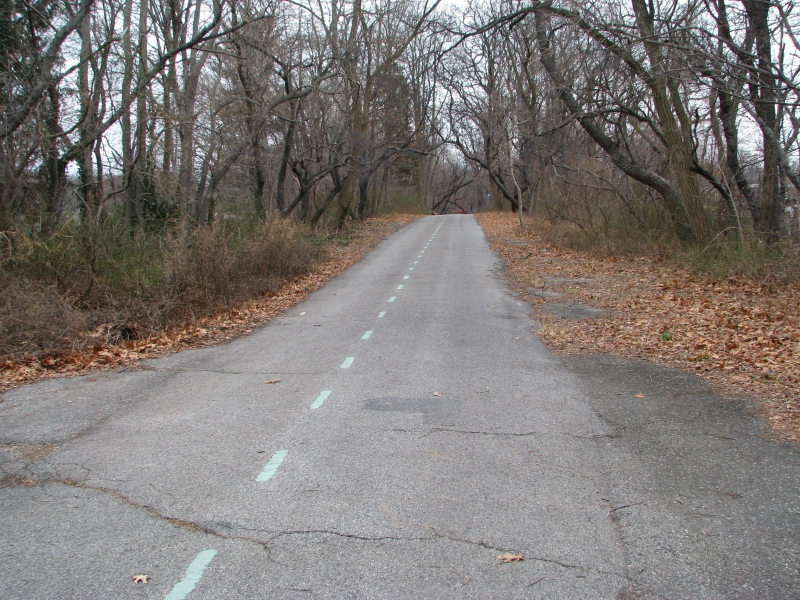
Remnant of Long Island Motor Parkway c. 2008 at Springfield Boulevard in nearby Oakland Gardens

New York Life Insurance Company built a 12-acre shopping center on 188th Street at Horace Harding Expressway. The shopping center was planned to include a Bloomingdale's, a movie theater, Canterbury Shops clothing store, Mary Lewis, Ormond Hosiery Shop, Woolworth's, Miles Shows, Buster Brown children's shoes, Selby women's shoes, Food Fair, a Horn & Hardart automat, Whelan's Drugs, Fanny Farmer, Union News, Womrath's Book Shop, Barrett Nephews dry cleaners, and Harris Brothers delicatessen, a Bank of Manhattan, a Jamaica Savings Bank, and a post office. Bloomingdale's opened on May 24, 1949. Century Meadows Theatre opened November 1949. In 1973, Bloomingdale's added a three-level extension to the store, on what had been a pedestrian plaza. Five 36-year-old oak trees were uprooted to construct the extension, to the dismay of nearby residents.

The QM1 express bus to Manhattan started operating in 1968 as part of a 90-day trial run proposed by city traffic commissioner Henry A. Barnes, transportation administrator Arthur A. Palmer, and the New York Life Insurance Company. This service was eventually kept, and it was expanded in 1970 with branches running further east into Queens. The combined QM1/QM1A service eventually became among the busiest privately operated express routes in the city by the 2000s.

In 1972, Harry B. Helmsley and the John D. and Catherine T. MacArthur Foundation partnered to buy the Fresh Meadows housing and retail complex for $53 million from the New York Life Insurance Company. The MacArthur Foundation acquired the property outright in 1995. In 1997, Witkoff Group and Insignia Financial Group bought the residential property, and Federal Realty Investment Trust bought the commercial property for $215 million.

Two months after the Bloomingdale's store was sold in August 1991, Kmart signed a 31-year lease for the space. Kmart's grand opening was on October 22, 1991. Kmart closed the store in 2003, as part of an effort to close underperforming stores. Kmart sold the lease to the Fresh Meadows location and four other locations to Kohl's for $16 million in 2003. The Kohl's in Fresh Meadows was the first Kohl's location in New York City.

=== Klein Farm ===
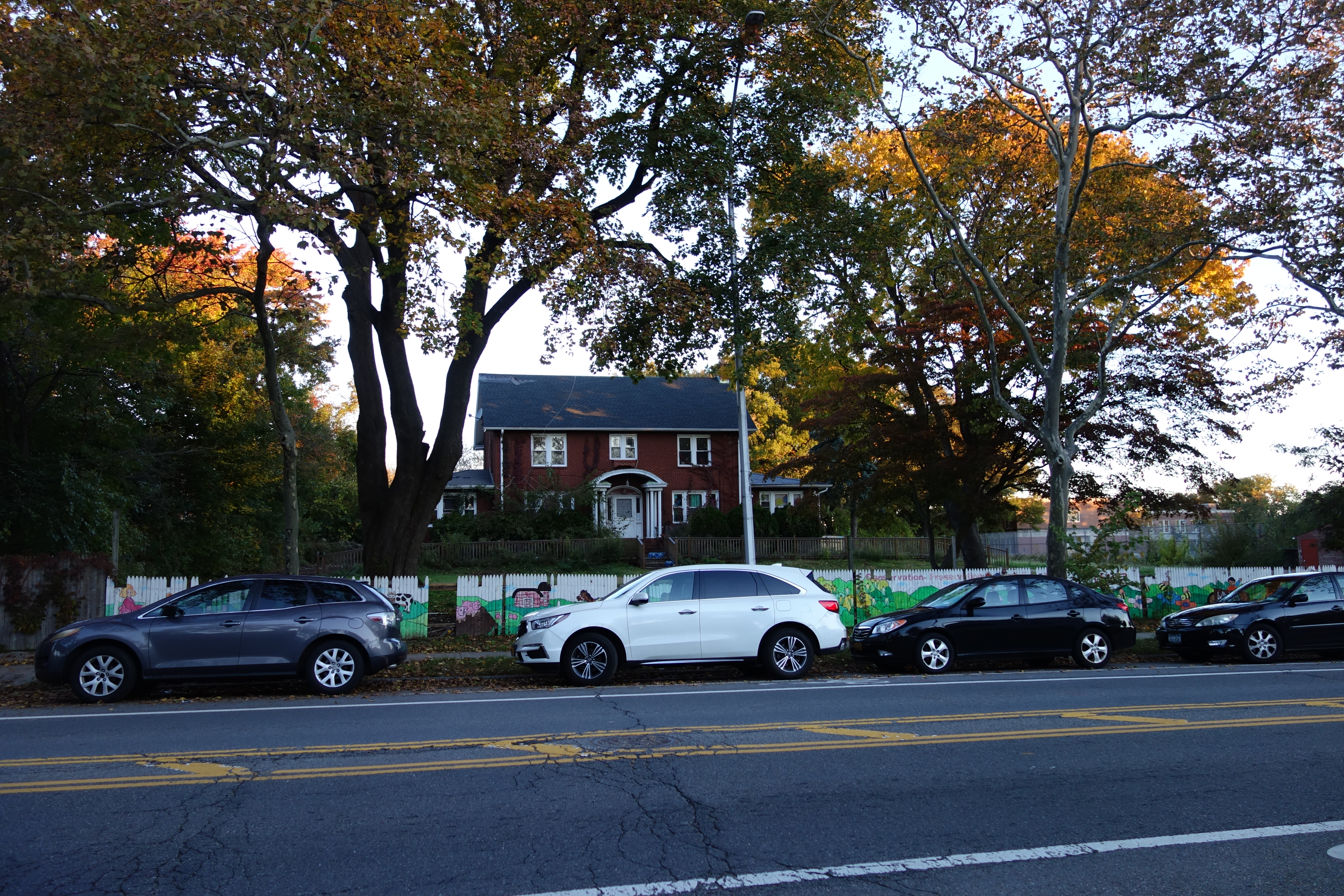
The former farmhouse of the Klein Farm on 73rd Avenue

Fresh Meadows was home to Klein Farm, the last surviving commercial farm in New York City, located on 73rd Avenue between 194th and 195th Streets. Adam Klein, from Brooklyn, bought the Voorhis farm in the 1890s. Klein bought the 200-acre plot of land for $18 per acre. The family sold portions of the land over time, but kept the two acres surrounding the farm house. His son, Charles Klein, was born on the farm and operated it after his father's death in 1954 at age 89. By the early 1990s, John Klein Sr. ran the farm as well as two larger farms, one in Riverhead and one in upstate New York. The family had received many offers over the years to buy the land in Fresh Meadows. In 1991, the family declined an offer from the owner of a local pizza store, who wanted to buy the property in order to convert the family's home into a country-style restaurant. John Klein Jr., the great-grandson of Adam Klein, was running the farm by the late 1990s.

The farm gradually became unprofitable, and in 2001, John Klein Sr. signed a contract to sell the two-acre property to Flushing-based developer Audrey Realty, who wanted to build 22 two-family homes on the site. The farm's last day open was November 21, 2001. Many in the community were opposed to the proposed sale, including the Fresh Meadows Tenants Association, the West Cunningham Park Civic Association, the Flushing Heights Civic Association, the Hillcrest Estates Civic Association, the Utopia Estates Civic Association, and the Utopia Park Civic Association. The community later learned that the developer was owned by the family of Tommy Huang, whose permits to restore the landmark RKO Keith's Theater in Flushing were revoked when he destroyed its lobby. Huang had also admitted to failing to report a spill of 10,000 gallons of heating oil from an underground tank into the soil beneath the RKO Keith's Theater in 1999. John Klein Sr. completed the sale to Huang for $4.3 million in late 2003.

The land was located in a Special Planned Community Preservation District and required a special permit to build homes there. David Weprin, the neighborhood's representative in the New York City Council, opposed granting the special permit. Faced with strong community opposition, Huang and Audrey Realty decided not to go forward with the plan, and they instead agreed to sell the land to a Westchester-based developer, Steven Judelson. At the time, Judelson said he had not decided what to do with the land. The sale did not go through.

In 2005, Huang sent a proposal to the City Planning Commission to build 18 two-family homes on the site. The proposal was not approved, and a day-care center was opened instead. Huang attempted to evict the day-care center in 2009, saying that he needed to end the lease early in order to sell the property. Huang settled with the day-care center to terminate its lease three months early so that Huang could sell the property to Fresh Meadows Jewish Development LLC for $5.6 million. The sale did not go through. In 2012, Huang was convicted of embezzling over $3 million of federal funds that were intended to pay for children's lunches at Huang's Red Apple Child Development Centers.

Huang finally sold the property to Ziming Shen's Fresh Meadows Children's Farm LLC for $5.6 million in 2014. New York City fined Shen $1,600 after Shen's daycare center, Preschool of America, cut down trees and modified the driveway on the property without the required permits.

=== Meadowlark Gardens ===
Meadowlark Gardens is a 288-unit residential apartment development between 65th Avenue, 197th Street, and 73rd Avenue. It was built by Mortimer M. Reznick, and George Miller was the architect. The first residents moved in on July 1, 1950. Reznick had previously built homes in the Williams Homes development at 197th Street and 73rd Avenue. Reznick also built residential developments called Williams Homes in Flushing and Bonnie Meadows in New Rochelle, and a commercial development in Yonkers.

Meadowlark Gardens Tenant Association was organized on June 3, 1977, in order to advocate for the tenants' rights.

== Subsections ==
=== Hillcrest ===
Map of Hillcrest

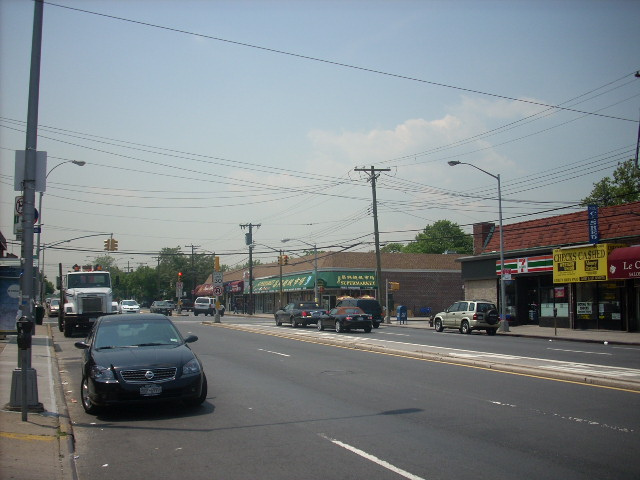
Union Turnpike in Hillcrest, 2007

Hillcrest is a neighborhood in the center of Queens; the name comes from its location on the hills between Flushing and Jamaica. Hillcrest stretches from the Grand Central Parkway to 73rd Avenue, between Utopia Parkway and Parsons Boulevard. Its main commercial street is Union Turnpike. Hillcrest is part of Queens Community Board 8. The ZIP Codes for the neighborhood are 11366 (Fresh Meadows and Flushing zip code) for anything above Union Turnpike, and 11432 or 11439 (Jamaica zip codes) for the southern part of the neighborhood (below Union Turnpike, north of Grand Central Parkway). It neighbors Kew Gardens Hills and Pomonok to the west, Fresh Meadows to the north, Utopia to the east, and Jamaica Hills to the south. It is mostly made up of single-family homes, is in a relatively well-off public school district, and has a low crime rate.

As with many neighborhoods in the city, different residents have varying perceptions of its boundaries.

==== History ====
75th Avenue was originally known as Hell Fire Lane, then Quarrelsome Lane, and then Eiseman Avenue.

In 1938 and 1939, Moss Brothers built approximately 550 homes along Utopia Parkway between Horace Harding Expressway and Grand Central Parkway. Moss Brothers hired architect Arthur E. Allen to design the homes. The development was called Hillcrest Gardens.

=== Utopia ===
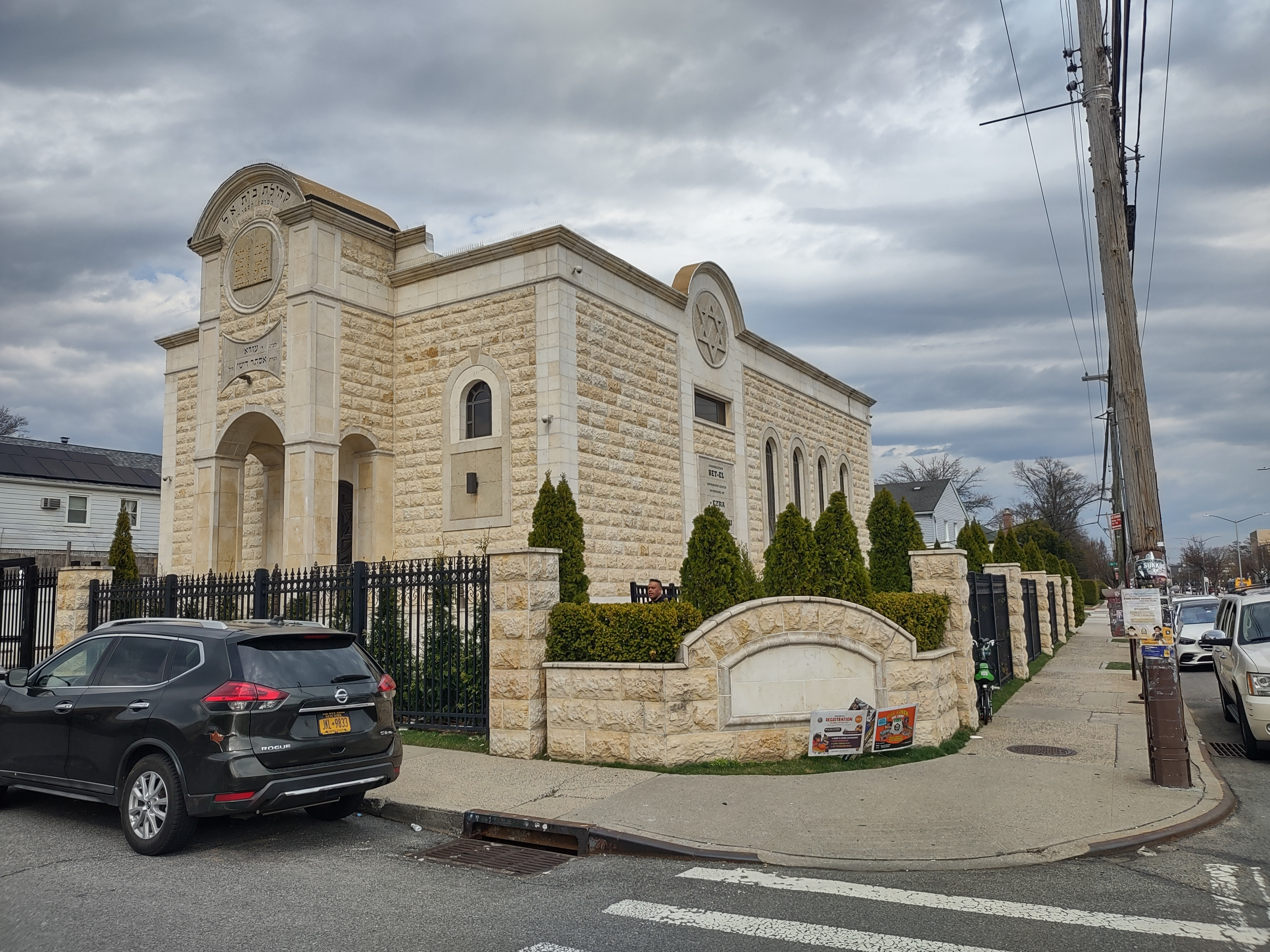
Bet-El Synagogue

Utopia is in the southeastern part of Fresh Meadows, bordered by Utopia Parkway to the west, 73rd Avenue to the north, 188th Street to the east, and Union Turnpike to the south. Utopia is part of Queens Community Board 8 and is often considered to be a part of Fresh Meadows, though The New York Times and the New York City Department of City Planning delineate Utopia as a separate neighborhood. Utopia's residents includes many Conservative and Orthodox Jews, Israeli Americans, Bukharian Jews, Chinese Americans, Korean Americans, and to a lesser extent, Russian Americans, Indian Americans, and Hispanic and Latino Americans. Utopia primarily consists of houses and tree-lined streets.

The triangular-shaped Utopia Playground, at Utopia Parkway and 73rd Avenue, used to be the site of the Black Stump School, when the area was still called Black Stump. The school was later replaced by Black Stump Hook, Ladder, and Bucket Company, a volunteer firehouse. Today, it has a playground, a softball field, basketball courts, and handball courts.

It is bordered by the neighborhoods of Hillcrest to the west, Fresh Meadows to the north and east, and Jamaica Estates to the south. Utopia is also home to the Hillcrest Jewish Center and the Queens Public Library at Hillcrest, both located on Union Turnpike.

==== History ====
Simon Freeman, Samuel Resler, and Joseph Fried incorporated the Utopia Land Company in 1903. The following year, the Utopia Land Company bought 161.25 acres (65 ha) of land between the communities of Jamaica and Flushing. The Utopia Land Company intended to build a cooperative community for Jewish families interested in moving away from the Lower East Side of Manhattan. They intended to name the streets after those on the Lower East Side, where there was already a large Jewish population.

After its initial acquisition, the company was unable to secure enough funding to further develop the area. In 1909, 118 acres (48 ha) of the land was sold to Felix Isman of Philadelphia for $350,000, equivalent to $12,500,000 in 2025.

The area remained farmland until 1935, when the land was bought by the Gross-Morton Park Corporation, run by George M. Gross, Alfred Gross, and Lawrence Morton. Gross-Morton had experience in building residential developments in Queens, such as when it had developed the land of the Belleclaire golf course in Bayside, around today's 48th Avenue and 211th Street. In 1937, the company bought 27 acres (11 ha) of contiguous farmland on the south side of Black Stump Road (now 73rd Avenue) from the Klein family. In 1939, it bought 117 acres (47 ha) of land that had been formerly part of the Klein Farm and the Wigmore estate. The land included about one mile of land directly on Union Turnpike, on which it built about forty stores.

On the land it bought in Utopia, the Gross-Morton Park Corporation built colonial and Cape Cod-style homes with either two or three bedrooms, each on approximately 4,000 square feet (372 m^{2}) of land in the early 1940s. Arthur Allen was the architect of the homes.

In 1938, Paul Roth bought the portion of the Klein Farm on the north side of Union Turnpike, between 185th Street and 188th Street, to build 70 houses.

The Batterman family owned and operated a farm on land bounded by Union Turnpike, Utopia Parkway, 75th Avenue, and 170th Street. In 1938, the Foch Building Corporation bought the Batterman Estate in order to develop it into a residential neighborhood, named University Manor. The Foch Building Corporation had previously built 111 houses in what is now St. Albans, Queens.

== Demographics ==
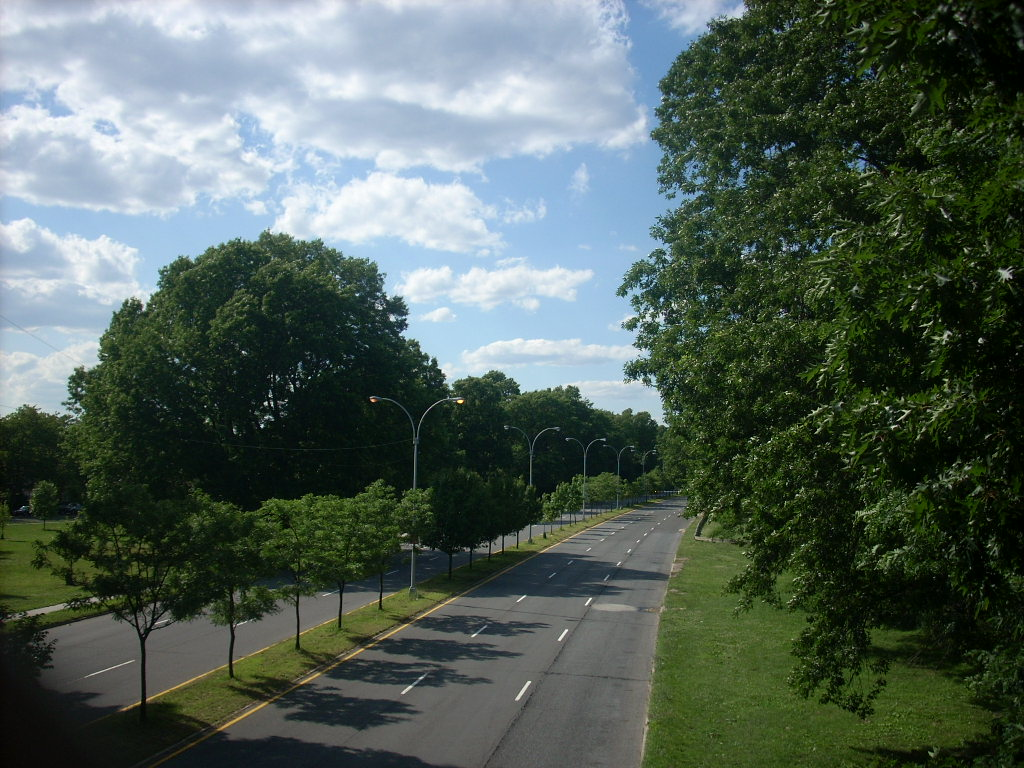
Cunningham Park

Based on data from the 2010 United States census, the population of Fresh Meadows (including Utopia but excluding Hillcrest) was 17,812, a change of 439 (2.5%) from the 17,373 counted in 2000. Covering an area of 636.38 acres (257.53 ha), the neighborhood had a population density of 28 inhabitants per acre (18,000/sq mi; 6,900/km^{2}).

The racial makeup of the neighborhood was 32.9% (5,864) White, 7.6% (1,355) African American, 0.1% (17) Native American, 47.1% (8,381) Asian, 0% (2) Pacific Islander, 0.4% (74) from other races, and 2% (356) from two or more races. Hispanic or Latino of any race were 9.9% (1,763) of the population.

The entirety of Community Board 8, which comprises Fresh Meadows as well as Kew Gardens Hills and Jamaica Hills, had 156,217 inhabitants as of NYC Health's 2018 Community Health Profile, with an average life expectancy of 83.9 years. This is higher than the median life expectancy of 81.2 for all New York City neighborhoods. Most inhabitants are middle-aged adults and youth: 20% are between the ages of 0–17, 28% between 25 and 44, and 27% between 45 and 64. The ratio of college-aged and elderly residents was lower, at 10% and 15% respectively.

As of 2017, the median household income in Community Board 8 was $64,005. In 2018, an estimated 22% of Fresh Meadows residents lived in poverty, compared to 19% in all of Queens and 20% in all of New York City. One in eleven residents (9%) were unemployed, compared to 8% in Queens and 9% in New York City. Rent burden, or the percentage of residents who have difficulty paying their rent, is 54% in Fresh Meadows, slightly higher than the boroughwide and citywide rates of 53% and 51% respectively. Based on this calculation, as of 2018, Fresh Meadows is considered to be high-income relative to the rest of the city and not gentrifying.

Population estimates of Fresh Meadows vary widely depending on which boundaries are considered. Zip codes 11365 and 11366 together have an estimated population of 59,873 as of 2017, according to the U.S. Census Bureau, but this also includes part of Auburndale north of the Long Island Expressway, while excluding Hillcrest. According to 2009 census data, however, the neighborhood had 16,100 residents, 44 percent of whom residents are white, 24 percent Asian, 14 percent black, 29 percent Hispanic, and 3 percent identify as multiracial. The neighborhood has historically and traditionally been home to one of New York City's most notable Jewish communities. Today, there is an increasing presence of younger Asian American and Colombian American families, Israeli Americans, Bukharian Jews, and West Indian Americans living in the neighborhood.

== Police and crime ==
Fresh Meadows is patrolled by the 107th Precinct of the NYPD, located at 71-01 Parsons Boulevard. The 107th Precinct ranked 11th safest out of 69 patrol areas for per-capita crime in 2010. The low crime rate was attributed primarily to the area's isolation and to local neighborhood patrols. As of 2018, with a non-fatal assault rate of 22 per 100,000 people, Fresh Meadows's rate of violent crimes per capita is lower than that of the city as a whole. The incarceration rate of 191 per 100,000 people is lower than that of the city as a whole.

The 107th Precinct has a lower crime rate than in the 1990s, with total major felony complaints decreasing by 83.5% between 1990 and 2025. In 2025, the precinct reported 3 murders, 24 rapes, 109 robberies, 259 felony assaults, 238 burglaries, 604 grand larcenies, and 356 grand larcenies auto.

== Fire safety ==
Fresh Meadows is served by two New York City Fire Department (FDNY) fire stations. Engine Co. 299/Ladder Co. 152 is located at 61-20 Utopia Parkway and serves Utopia and the Fresh Meadows development, while Engine Co. 315/Ladder Co. 125 is located at 159-06 Union Turnpike and serves Hillcrest and southern Fresh Meadows.

== Health ==
As of 2018, preterm births and births to teenage mothers are less common in Fresh Meadows than in other places citywide. In Fresh Meadows, there were 74 preterm births per 1,000 live births (compared to 87 per 1,000 citywide), and 6.7 births to teenage mothers per 1,000 live births (compared to 19.3 per 1,000 citywide). Fresh Meadows has a relatively average population of residents who are uninsured. In 2018, this population of uninsured residents was estimated to be 11%, which is slightly lower than the citywide rate of 12%.

The concentration of fine particulate matter, the deadliest type of air pollutant, in Fresh Meadows is 0.0078 milligrams per cubic metre (7.8×10^{−9} oz/ft^{3}), lower than the citywide and boroughwide averages. Fourteen percent of Fresh Meadows residents are smokers, which is equal to the city average of 14% of residents being smokers. In Fresh Meadows, 19% of residents are obese, 11% are diabetic, and 29% have high blood pressure—compared to the citywide averages of 20%, 14%, and 24% respectively. In addition, 18% of children are obese, compared to the citywide average of 20%.

Eighty-nine percent of residents eat some fruits and vegetables every day, which is higher than the city's average of 87%. In 2018, 79% of residents described their health as "good", "very good", or "excellent", about the same as the city's average of 78%. For every supermarket in Fresh Meadows, there are 5 bodegas.

The nearest large hospitals to Fresh Meadows are Queens Hospital Center in Hillcrest and NewYork–Presbyterian Queens in Flushing.

== Post offices and ZIP Codes ==
Fresh Meadows is covered by ZIP Codes 11365 north of 73rd Avenue; 11366 between 73rd Avenue and Union Turnpike. The United States Post Office operates two locations in Fresh Meadows: the Fresh Meadows Finance Station at 193-04 Horace Harding Expressway, and the Utopia Station, at 182-04 Union Turnpike in Utopia.

== Education ==
Fresh Meadows generally has a higher ratio of college-educated residents than the rest of the city as of 2018. Half of residents (50%) have a college education or higher, while 14% have less than a high school education and 37% are high school graduates or have some college education. By contrast, 39% of Queens residents and 43% of city residents have a college education or higher. The percentage of Fresh Meadows students excelling in math rose from 51 percent in 2000 to 71 percent in 2011, and reading achievement rose from 56% to 57% during the same time period.

Fresh Meadows's rate of elementary school student absenteeism is less than the rest of New York City. In Fresh Meadows, 15% of elementary school students missed twenty or more days per school year, less than the citywide average of 20%. Additionally, 86% of high school students in Fresh Meadows graduate on time, more than the citywide average of 75%.

=== Schools ===
==== Public ====
Fresh Meadows and Hillcrest contain the following public elementary schools.

- P.S. 4 (grades PK–8)
- P.S. 26 Rufus King School (grades PK–5)
- P.S. 154 (grades PK–5)
- P.S. 173 Fresh Meadow School (grades PK–5)
- P.S./I.S. 178 Holliswood School (grades PK–8)
- P.S. 255 (grades PK–12)

Fresh Meadows and Hillcrest contain the following public middle schools.

- J.H.S. 216 George J. Ryan School (grades 6–8) — opened September 1955, named after the former 15-year president of the Board of Education
- Queens Gateway To Health Sciences Secondary School (grades 6–12)
- Queens School of Inquiry (grades 6–12)

Francis Lewis High School (grades 9–12) is located in Fresh Meadows.

==== Private ====
St. Francis Preparatory School, the largest Catholic high school in the United States, is located in Fresh Meadows.

The Summit School, a state-approved tuition-free private school serving students with special education needs, holds classes at Hillcrest Jewish Center in Utopia.

St. John's University, a private Catholic university, has its main campus in Hillcrest.

The Japanese Weekend School of New York, a Japanese weekend school, holds classes at the building of P.S. 26. The school also holds classes in Westchester County and Long Island.

The Japanese School of New York formerly held classes in Fresh Meadows between 1980 and 1991.

=== Libraries ===
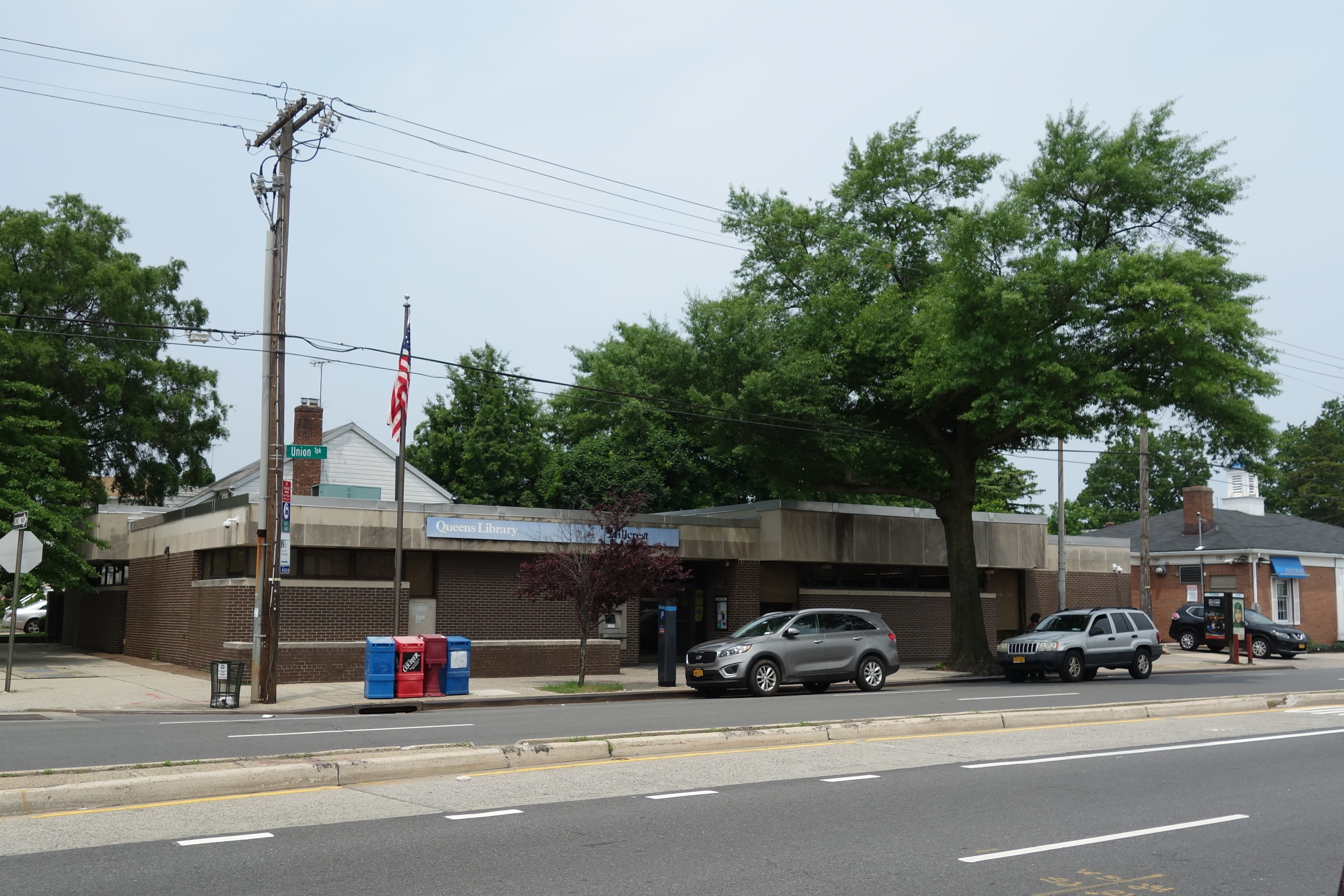
Hillcrest branch, Queens Public Library

The Queens Public Library operates two branches in Fresh Meadows. The Fresh Meadows branch is located at 193-20 Horace Harding Expressway, and the Hillcrest branch is located at 187-05 Union Turnpike in Utopia.

== Transportation ==
=== Buses ===
Although there are no New York City Subway stations in Fresh Meadows, several local MTA Regional Bus Operations routes serve the neighborhood and connect to the subway. These include the:

- Q17: to Jamaica (F and <F> train) or Flushing–Main Street (7 and <7> trains) via Horace Harding Expressway and 188th Street
- Q26: to College Point via Hollis Court Boulevard
- Q30: to Jamaica LIRR (E, J, and Z trains) or Little Neck via Utopia Parkway and Horace Harding Expressway
- Q31: to Jamaica LIRR (E, J, and Z trains) or Bay Terrace via Utopia Parkway
- Q45: to Kew Gardens–Union Turnpike (E, F, and <F> trains) via Union Turnpike and 188th Street
- Q46: to Kew Gardens–Union Turnpike (E, F, and <F> trains) or LI Jewish Hospital via Union Turnpike
- Q48: to Kew Gardens–Union Turnpike (E, F, and <F> trains) or Glen Oaks via Union Turnpike
- Q74: to Forest Hills–71st Avenue (E, F, <F>, M, and R trains) via Horace Harding Expressway and 164th Street
- Q75: to Jamaica LIRR (E, J, and Z trains) or Queensborough Community College via Utopia Parkway and Horace Harding Expressway
- Q76: to 168th Street Bus Terminal (F and <F> train or College Point via Francis Lewis Boulevard
- Q88: to Woodhaven Boulevard (M and R trains) or Queens Village LIRR via Horace Harding Expressway, 188th Street and 73rd Avenue

In addition, the Union Turnpike express buses run along Union Turnpike, 188th Street, and 73rd Avenue, providing service to Manhattan:

- QM1, QM5, QM6, QM31, QM35 and QM36 to Midtown Manhattan
- QM7 and QM8 to Lower Manhattan

=== Trains ===
The Long Island Rail Road (LIRR)'s Auburndale station is nearby and provides access on the Port Washington Branch to Midtown Manhattan. Buses also run to the LIRR stations at Flushing–Main Street and Jamaica.

==== Former ====
In June 1873, the Central Railroad of Long Island opened a station, called Frankiston, on Black Stump Road, now called 73rd Avenue. It was east of the present-day Clearview Expressway, where Cunningham Park is now. The railroad line continued northwest, along the parkland between today's Peck Avenue and Underhill Avenue, ultimately ending in downtown Flushing.

The origin of the name Frankiston is unknown. Loomis L. White, the railroad's second largest stockholder, had bought all the land surrounding the station in April 1871. The station's building was built by E.W. Karker & Co. of College Point, April–May 1873. The train fare from Frankston to downtown Flushing was $0.30 (equivalent to $8 in 2025). The station was first included in railroad timetables in June 1873.

On April 30, 1879, the station was closed and the railroad line was abandoned.

==== Proposed ====
In the 1970s, an extension of the subway system along Horace Harding Expressway was proposed as part of the Program for Action, but it was ultimately not built.

=== Highways ===
The Long Island Expressway (I-495) connects Fresh Meadows with both midtown Manhattan and Long Island, while the Clearview Expressway (I-295) provides access to the Bronx and the New England Thruway.

The Long Island Motor Parkway, formerly a highway, is now used as a biking and walking trail, as part of the Brooklyn–Queens Greenway.

== In media ==
In October 2011, a book written by Fred Cantor and Debra Davidson that chronicled the history of Fresh Meadows was released. The book is part of the Images of America series.

== Notable people ==
- Bruce Bierman (born 1953), interior designer
- Nily Rozic (born 1986), member of the New York State Assembly
