= Bruce Bierman =

American interior designer

Bruce Bierman is an American interior designer and president of Bruce Bierman Design, Inc., based in New York City.

Bruce Bierman died on August 6, 2025, at the age of 72.

== Early life and education ==
Bierman was born on May 9, 1953, and raised in Fresh Meadows, Queens with his parents and sisters. He was trained in Architecture as well as the Fine Arts at the Rhode Island School of Design and moved to Manhattan after graduating. Bierman’s first assignment came soon after his debut project - his own apartment- was published in New York. His first commission was the design of a villa in Acapulco.

== Career ==
Bierman established Bruce Bierman Design in 1984, and specializes in residential and commercial design. His work epitomizes an East Coast style with a sophisticated but understated aesthetic, which has become the hallmark of his work. His approach is frequently likened to couture workmanship, using the finest materials, clean lines, and attention to detailing.

Bierman’s worldwide portfolio of projects include a 15,000-square-foot (1,400 m^{2}) residence in Greenwich, Connecticut, a townhouse and artist studio on New York City’s Upper East Side, a Penthouse at the Breakers Hotel in Palm Beach, a 3,500-square-foot (330 m^{2}) Penthouse loft in New York City’s Chelsea neighborhood, and a coastal vacation compound in Seal Harbor.

In 2000, Bruce was inducted into the Interior Design ‘Hall of Fame’. His work has received extensive acclaim from his peers as well as from the design press.

Since 1995, Bruce Bierman has been a member of the Designers Collaborative.

== Media coverage ==
Bruce Bierman’s work has appeared both in print and on television, including The New York Times, Elle Décor, House Beautiful and the following publications and outlets:

- Interior Design
- Hamptons Cottages & Gardens
- New York Home
- Palm Beach Cottages & Gardens
- MetroSource NY
- The Robb Report
- The Home Observer
- Area
- KBB
- Avenue Magazine
- Espaco’d
