= Jamaica Estates, Queens =

Neighborhood in New York City

Coordinates: 40.719°N 73.774°W

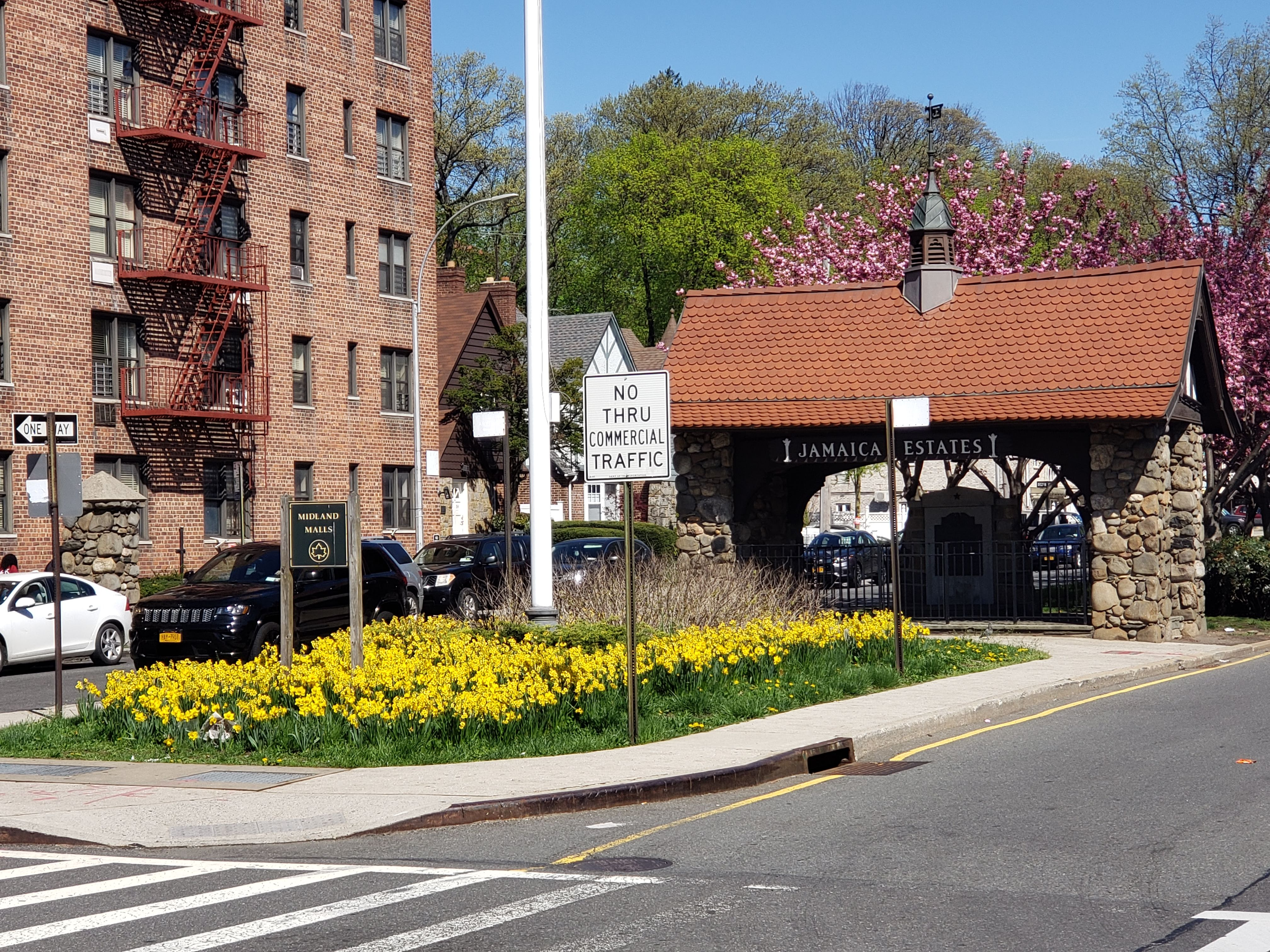
Jamaica Estates Memorial on a spring morning

Jamaica Estates is a neighborhood in the New York City borough of Queens. Jamaica Estates is part of Queens Community District 8 and located in the northern portion of Jamaica. It is bounded by Union Turnpike to the north, Hillside Avenue to the south, Utopia Parkway and Homelawn Street to the west, and 188th Street to the east. The main road through the neighborhood is Midland Parkway and Union.

The surrounding neighborhoods are Jamaica Hills to the west; Jamaica to the southwest; Hollis to the southeast; Holliswood and Queens Village to the east; and Fresh Meadows, Utopia, and Hillcrest to the north.

== Character ==
Map of Jamaica Estates

The area is characterized by houses in the Tudor, Craftsman, Cape Cod, or Mediterranean styles. Out of 14,000 residents, 45% are foreign-born. In the 2000 United States census, 43% of residents were white, Bangladeshis comprise 11% of residents, while Filipinos make up 10%, Haitians 7%, Guyanese 5%, and Russians 4%. A population of over 1,000 Bukharan Jews live in the area. Jamaica Estates has significant Modern Orthodox Jewish American and South Asian American populations.

== History ==
Jamaica Estates was created in 1907 by the Jamaica Estates Corporation, which developed the hilly terminal moraine's 503 acres (2.04 km^{2}), while preserving many of the trees that had occupied the site. The company was founded by Ernestus Gulick and Felix Isman, both of Philadelphia.

In 2007, following the damage of the roof of the Historic Gatehouse in Hurricane Isabel, the restoration and beautification of the Gatehouse and Malls was completed.

The Jamaica Estates Association, founded in 1929, continues as an active, vital civic organization representing the community. A historical plaque was unveiled April 23, 2010, on the Midland Mall by The Aquinas Honor Society of the Immaculate Conception School (now the Immaculate Conception Catholic Academy) and by the sponsor of the plaque, Senator Frank Padavan.

== Education ==
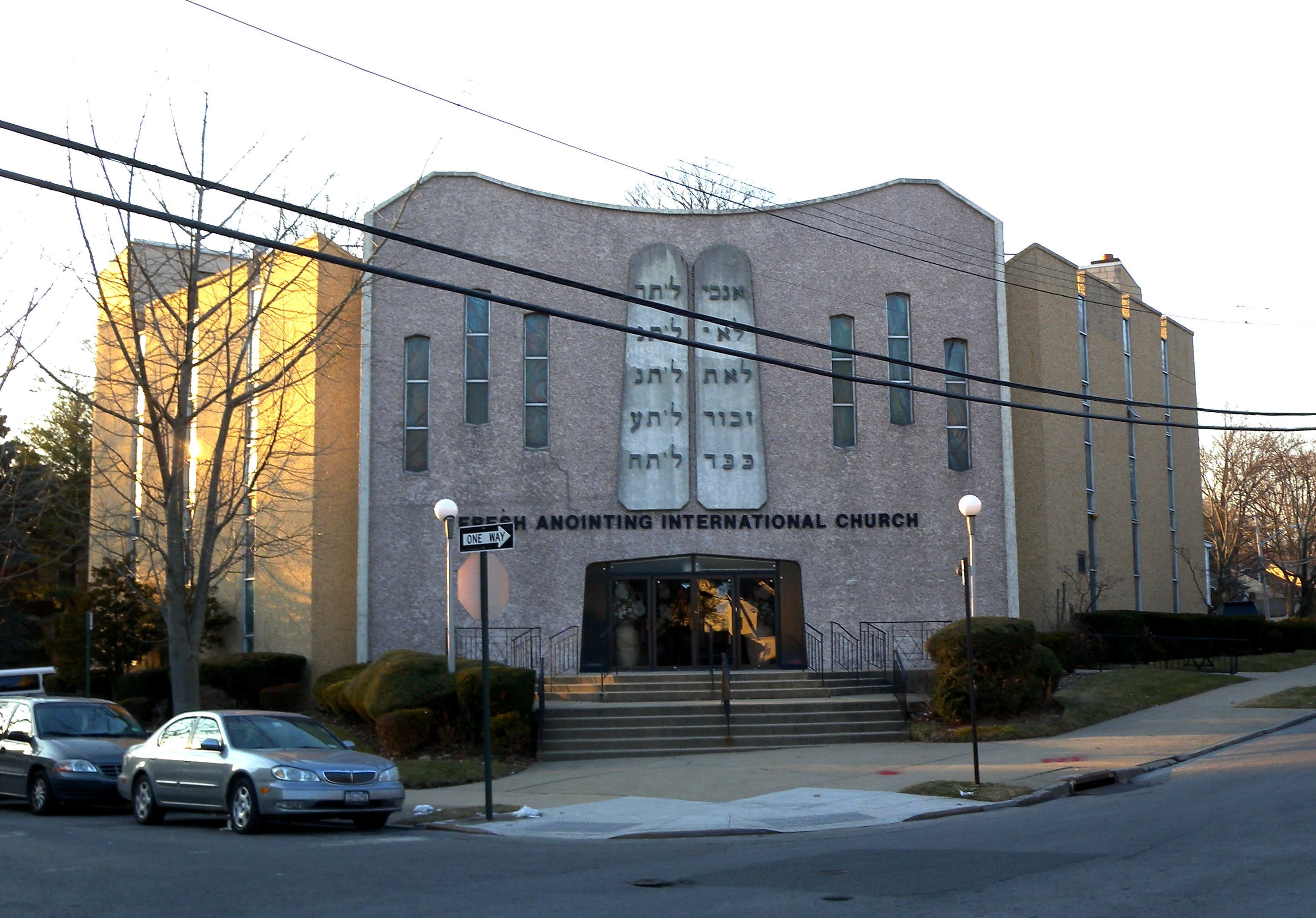
Fresh Anointing International Church

The New York City Department of Education operates public schools:

- Holliswood School (PS 178) in School District 26, at 189th Street in Fresh Meadows, Queens
- Abigail Adams School (PS 131) in School District 29 in Jamaica Hills

Private schools include:

- The Mary Louis Academy, an all-girls Catholic college-prep school, is located on the corner of Edgerton Boulevard and Wexford Terrace.
- Immaculate Conception School is on the corner of Midland Parkway and Dalny Road.(Immaculate conception School is now named Immaculate Conception Catholic Academy.)
- The Summit School has their high school on 188th Street and the Grand Central Parkway in Jamaica Estates.
- Yeshiva University High School for Girls is just east of the Estates in Holliswood
- United Nations International School Queens Campus, for students in grades K-8, is located on Croydon Road; intended for the children of UN diplomats and employees, enrollment is now open to everyone. The school first opened in Lake Success, but relocated in 1950 to Parkway Village.
- From its 1975 founding to around 1980, The Japanese School of New York was located in Jamaica Estates, at where is now The Summit School.

== Transportation ==
The New York City Subway's IND Queens Boulevard Line serves the neighborhood at the line's Jamaica–179th Street terminal station (E, F, and <F> trains), as well as the penultimate 169th Street local station (F and <F> train). The neighborhood is also served by the Q1, Q2, Q3, Q36, Q43, Q76, Q77, Q82 local bus lines on Hillside Avenue, the Q45, Q46, Q48 buses serve the area along Union Turnpike, the Q30, Q31, Q75 buses on Homelawn Street and Utopia Parkway, and the Q17 bus serving the area on Hillside Avenue and 188th Street. Numerous express buses (QM1, QM5, QM6, QM7, QM8, QM31, QM35, QM36, QM68) to Manhattan also stop on Union Turnpike and Hillside Avenue.

In contrast to much of Queens, most streets in Jamaica Estates do not conform to the rectangular street grid and follow topographic lines, the most notable example being Midland Parkway. Many of the named streets have etymologies originating from Languages of the United Kingdom, such as Aberdeen, Avon, Hovenden, Barrington, Chelsea, and Chevy Chase Street. However, unlike Forest Hills Gardens, which is a similarly wealthy Queens neighborhood with an atypical Queens street layout, the street numbering system does conform to the grid in the rest of Queens. Jamaica Estates's house numbering system, as in the rest of Queens, uses a hyphen between the closest cross-street going west to east or north to south (which comes before the hyphen) and the actual house number (which comes after the hyphen).

== Notable residents ==
- Gretel Bergmann (1914–2017), German high jump champion of the 1930s, later United States champion in high jump (1937 and 1938) and shot put (1938)
- Peter Brant (born 1947), industrialist, art collector and champion horse breeder
- Lou Carnesecca (1925–2024), retired basketball coach of the St. John's Red Storm men's basketball and the New York Nets, who was inducted into the Naismith Memorial Basketball Hall of Fame in 1992
- Frank D. O'Connor (1909–1992), attorney and judge
- Lois Sasson (1940–2020), jewelry designer, gay rights activist, and longtime partner of singer-songwriter Lesley Gore
- Joseph "Run" Simmons (born 1964), the "Run" of Run-D.M.C.
- Lennie Tristano (1919–1978), blind bebop pianist and teacher, who has been credited as the first to record "free jazz"
- Donald Trump (born 1946), 45th and 47th President of the United States, was born while the family lived at 85-15 Wareham Place, later moving within the neighborhood to 85-14 Midland Parkway
- Fred Trump (1905–1999), real estate developer and father of Donald Trump, built and resided in two houses in the neighborhood
