= Union Turnpike express buses =

Express bus routes in New York City

qm1 / qm5 / qm6 qm7 / qm8 qm31 / qm35 /qm36
- Union Turnpike; Manhattan–Queens Express
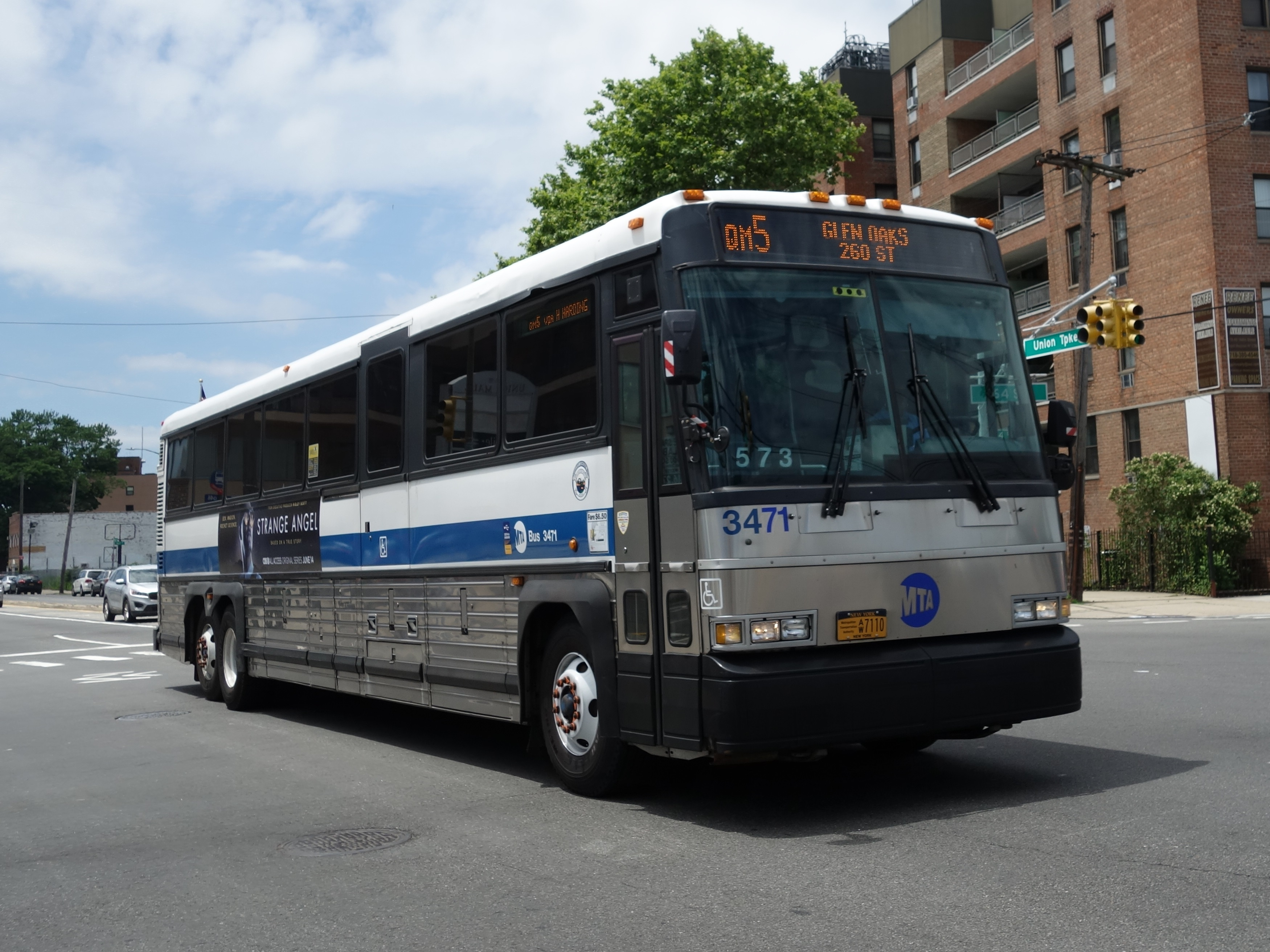
- A 2007 Motor Coach D4500CL (3471) on the Glen Oaks-bound QM5 at Union Turnpike/164th Street in June 2018

Overview
- System: MTA Regional Bus Operations
- Operator: MTA Bus Company
- Garage: College Point Depot
- Vehicle: MCI D4500CL; MCI D4500CT; Prevost X3-45
- Began service: February 26, 1968 (QM1)

Route
- Locale: Queens and Manhattan, New York, U.S.
- Communities served: Queens: Kew Gardens Hills, Hillcrest, Fresh Meadows, Hollis Hills, Oakland Gardens, Bellerose, Little Neck, Glen Oaks; Nassau County: Lake Success
- Start: Fresh Meadows, Queens – 188th Street & Horace Harding Expressway (QM1, QM7, QM31); Glen Oaks, Queens – 260th Street & Union Turnpike (QM5, QM8, QM35); Glen Oaks, Queens / Lake Success, Nassau County – North Shore Towers (QM6, QM36)
- Via: Union Turnpike, Queens Boulevard, Long Island Expressway & Midtown Tunnel (westbound) / Queensboro Bridge (eastbound)
- End: Midtown Manhattan – Sixth Avenue (QM1, QM5, QM6); Midtown Manhattan – Third Avenue (QM31, QM35, QM36); Downtown Manhattan – Downtown Loop (QM7, QM8)
- Other routes: Q45/Q46/Q48 Union Turnpike

Service
- Operates: (see below)
- Annual patronage: QM1/QM31: 91,400 (2025); QM5/QM35: 415,104 (2025); QM6/QM36: 195,380 (2025); QM7: 123,560 (2025); QM8: 97,346 (2025)
- Transfers: Yes
- Timetable: QM1/QM5/QM6/QM31/QM35/QM36; QM 7/QM8

The QM1, QM5, QM6, QM7, QM8, QM31, QM35, and QM36 bus routes constitute a public transit line in New York City, operating express between Northeast Queens and Midtown or Downtown Manhattan. The routes operate primarily on Union Turnpike in Queens, and travel non-stop via Queens Boulevard, the Long Island Expressway, and the Midtown Tunnel or Queensboro Bridge between Queens and Manhattan.

The routes are numbered based on their origin and destination; buses that run to Third Avenue in Midtown Manhattan are double-digit routes that start with the number "3" or "4", while all other routes are single-digit routes. Some QM8 buses provide a "Super Express" service, with longer non-stop sections during the trip.

The routes were originally privately operated under the QM1 and QM1A designations by Steinway Transit Corporation and Queens Surface Corporation from 1968 to 2005. The routes are now operated by MTA Regional Bus Operations under the MTA Bus Company brand. Following MTA takeover, the two designations were split into eight different routes signifying different service patterns.

== Route description and service ==
Borough	Routes	Routing
Manhattan	QM1 QM5 QM6	Sixth Avenue
Manhattan	QM7 QM8	Financial District
Manhattan	QM31 QM35 QM36	Third Avenue
		Destination
Queens	QM1 QM7 QM31	188th Street & Horace Harding Expressway
Queens	QM5 QM8 QM35	260th Street & Union Turnpike via Horace Harding Expressway
Queens	QM6 QM36	North Shore Towers

The Union Turnpike express routes consist of eight bus routes: the QM1, QM5, QM6, QM7, QM8, QM31, QM35, and QM36. They begin at three different termini in Northeast Queens, each running via different corridors. All eight bus routes run along Union Turnpike west of 188th Street, then along Queens Boulevard and the Long Island Expressway. The routes then split into three corridors in Manhattan: the QM1, QM5, and QM6 via Sixth Avenue in Midtown; the QM31, QM35, and QM36 via Third Avenue in Midtown; and the QM7 and QM8 to the Financial District in Downtown Manhattan. Westbound, the routes only pick up passengers in Queens and discharge passengers in Manhattan, while eastbound buses receive passengers in Manhattan before dropping off passengers in Queens. In Manhattan, there are segments where buses provide "open-door" service, both dropping off Manhattan-bound passengers and picking up Queens-bound riders. Passengers are able to transfer between buses at points along Union Turnpike.

=== Queens service ===
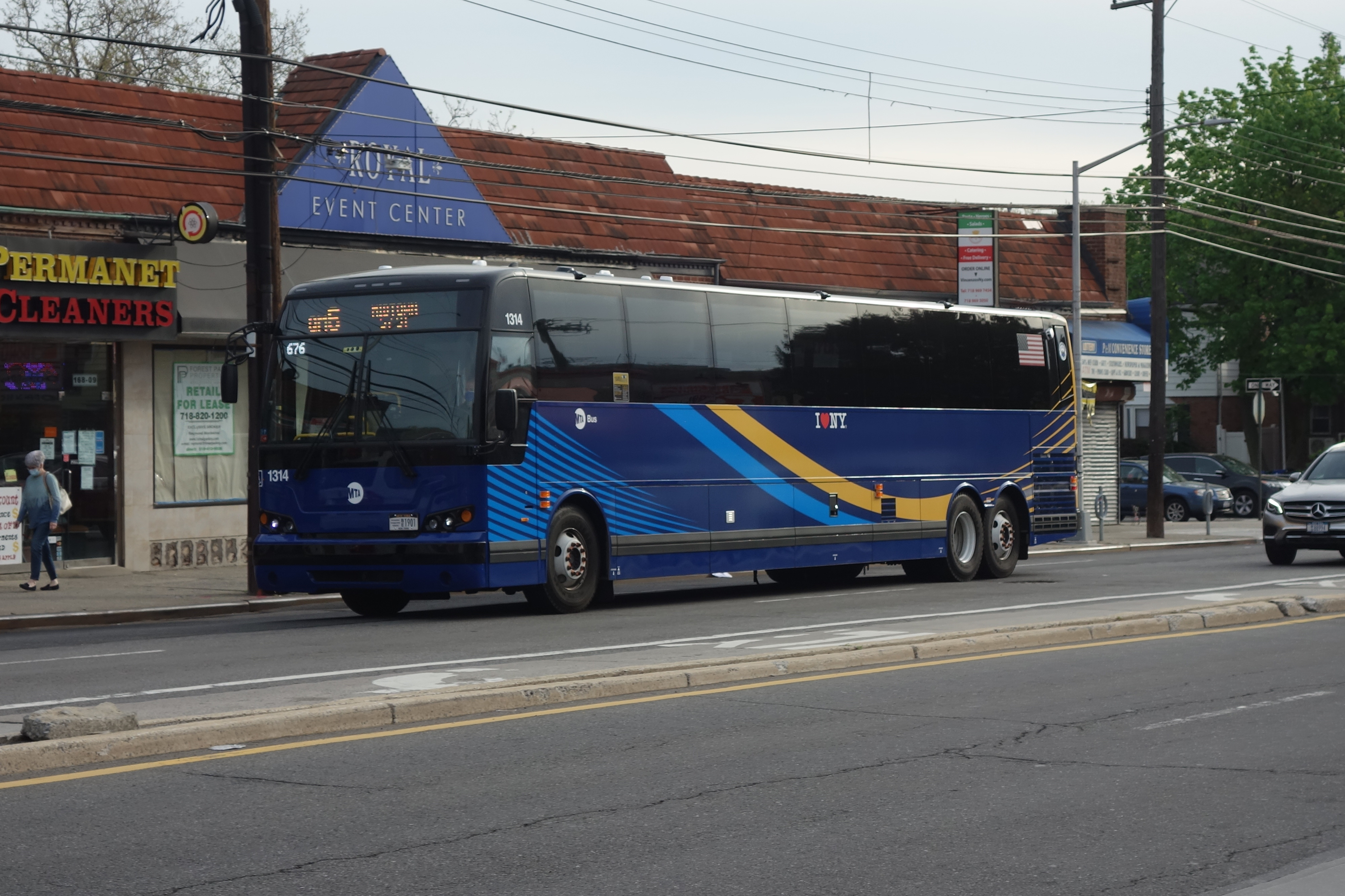
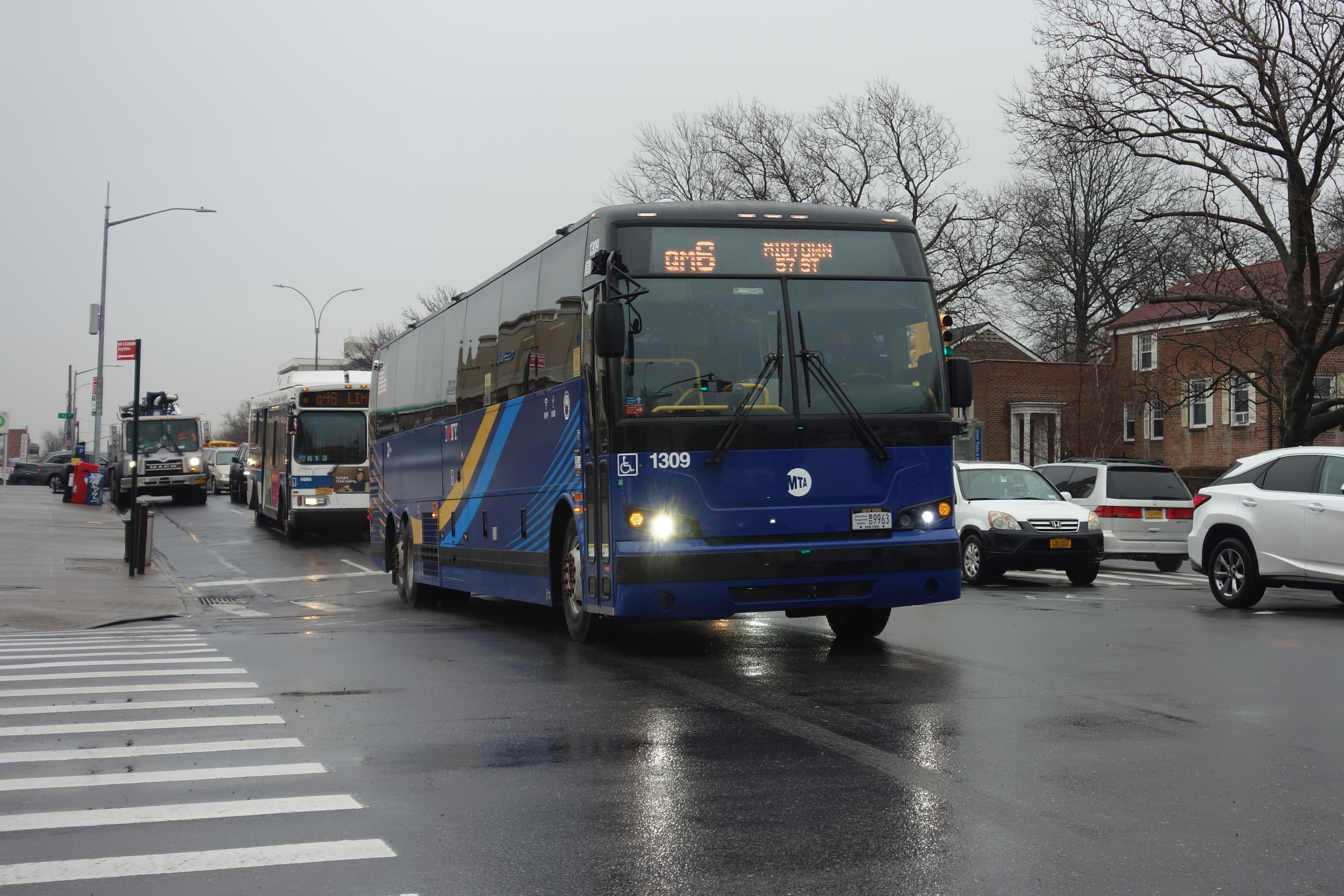
Two 2021 Prevost X3-45s on the Midtown via 6th Ave-bound QM6 on Union Turnpike: 1314 at 168th Street in May 2021, and 1309 at Main Street in March 2021

The QM6 and QM36 begin service at the North Shore Towers apartment complex in Glen Oaks, Queens, on the border with Lake Success, Nassau County. The routes run east along Marcus Avenue (the eastbound service road for the Grand Central/Northern State Parkway at this location) to Lakeville Road in Lake Success, then south along Lakeville Road past Long Island Jewish Medical Center to Union Turnpike. The routes then travel west through Queens along Union Turnpike, parallel to the Q46 local bus route.

The QM5, QM8, and QM35 routes begin service at 260th Street and Union Turnpike in Glen Oaks, intersecting with the Q46, QM6, and QM36. These routes, however, travel a circuitous route through Northeast Queens, running north on 260th Street and Little Neck Parkway into Little Neck, then west along the Horace Harding Expressway service road through Bayside and Oakland Gardens. The routes turn south onto Springfield Boulevard, then west again onto 73rd Avenue. After entering Fresh Meadows, the routes turn south onto 188th Street, merging with the QM1, QM7, and QM31 routes, and then turn west at Union Turnpike, meeting the QM6 and QM36.

The QM1, QM7, and QM31 routes begin service at 188th Street and Horace Harding Expressway, at the Fresh Meadows Shopping Center and the Fresh Meadows Houses apartment complex. They run south down 188th Street before turning west onto Union Turnpike and meeting the other routes of the corridor. There are only three stops along 188th Street that are served exclusively by the QM1/QM7/QM31 corridor. During off-peak hours, the QM5 serves two of these stops, turning north from 73rd Avenue onto 188th Street, then making a U-turn using a roundabout at 64th Avenue.

West of 188th Street, all eight routes share Union Turnpike, making pickups westbound or drop offs eastbound, until Main Street in Kew Gardens Hills near the Kew Gardens Interchange. Here, the routes begin non-stop express service along Queens Boulevard. Near Woodhaven Boulevard in Rego Park, all of the midtown routes' westbound buses turn onto the Long Island Expressway (LIE) and utilize the Queens–Midtown Tunnel to enter Manhattan, as do numerous other express routes from Queens. Except for the QM7 and QM8, eastbound buses travel from Manhattan via the Queensboro Bridge and Queens Boulevard. The QM7 and QM8 use the Midtown Tunnel in both directions, as they run via Lower Manhattan via the FDR Drive.

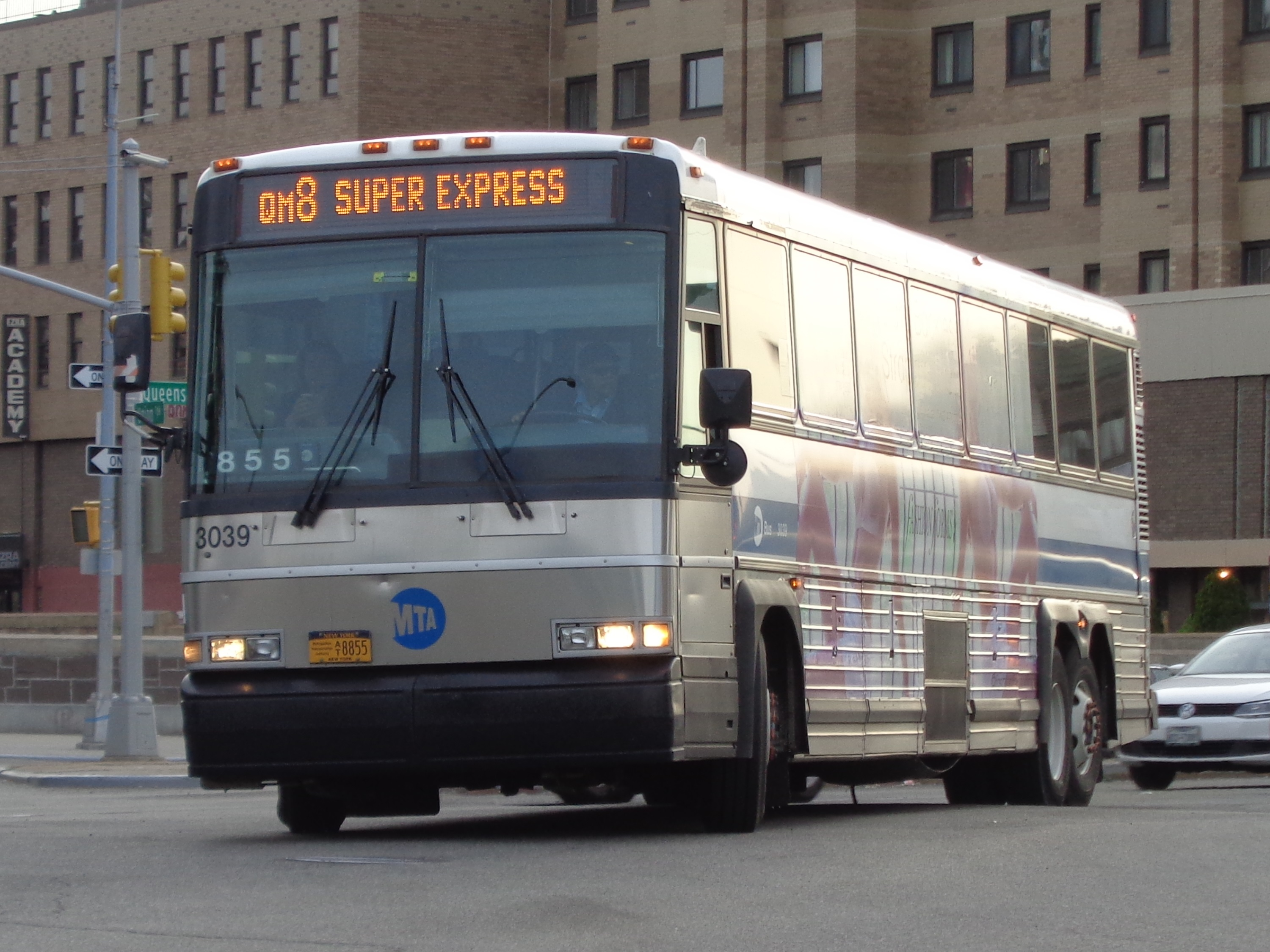
A 2005 Motor Coach D4500CL (3039) on the Glen Oaks-bound QM8 "Super Express" turning onto Union Turnpike in Kew Gardens

Manhattan-bound QM8 super express service runs along the normal QM8 route to 188th Street. Buses then turn north on 188th Street and then onto the LIE, bypassing the Union Turnpike portion of the route. Queens-bound super express buses follow the normal QM8 route within Queens to 188th Street, then run north to Fresh Meadows (via the QM5 off-peak route) before turning east towards Glen Oaks.

=== Manhattan service ===
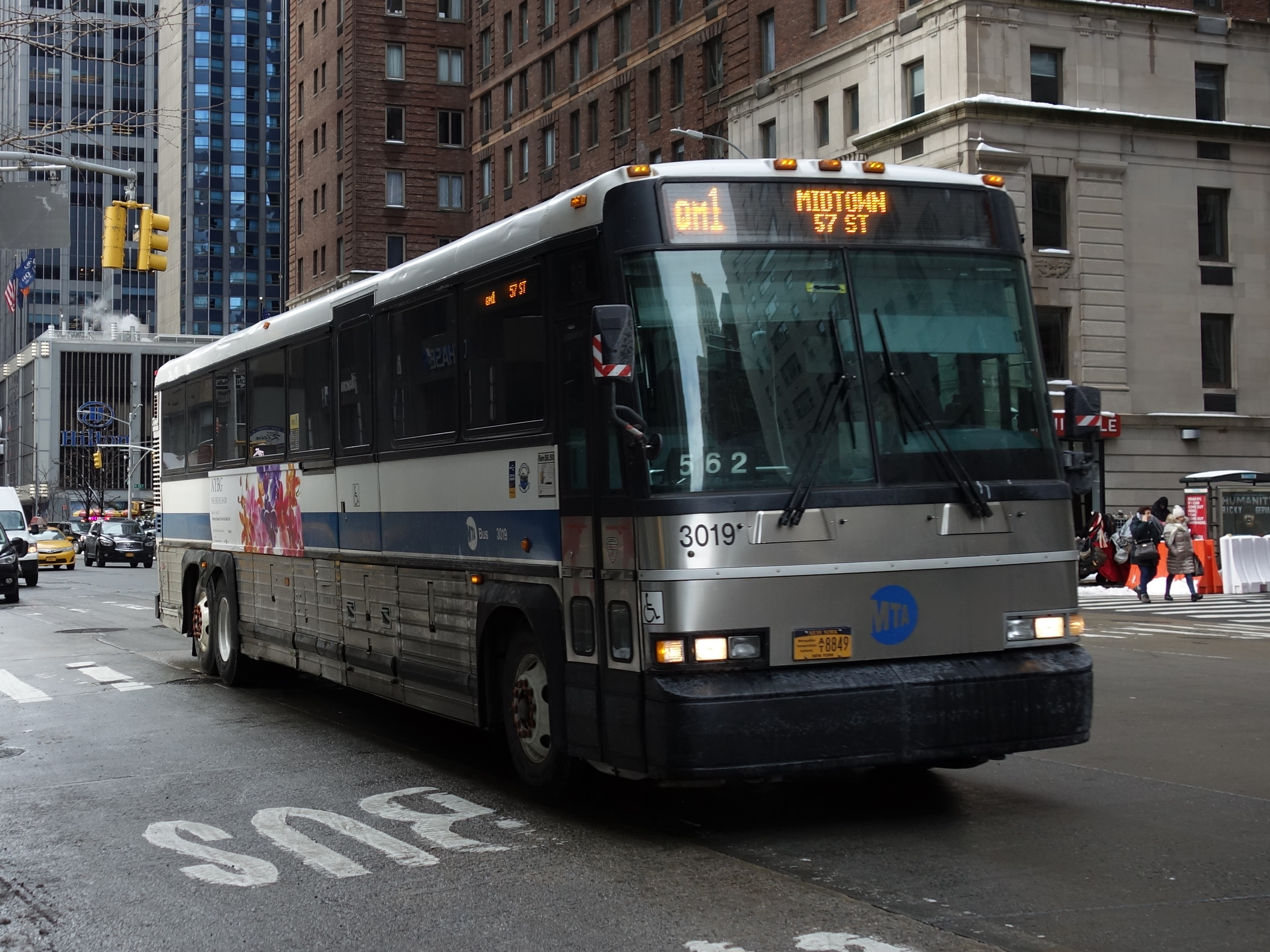
A 2005 Motor Coach D4500CL (3019) on the Midtown-bound QM1 bus at 6th Avenue/56th Street in Manhattan

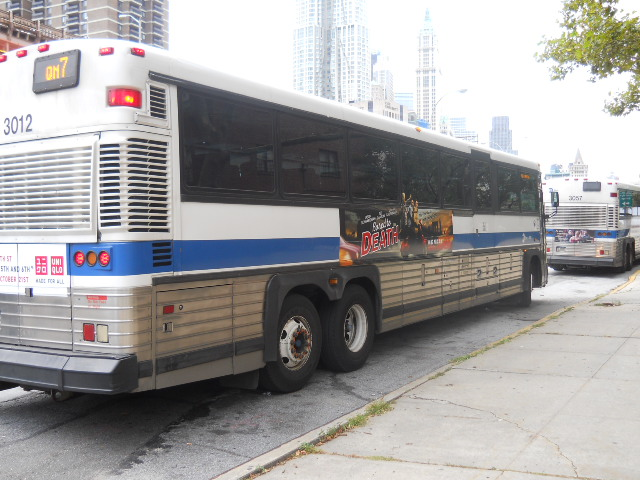
A 2005 Motor Coach D4500CL (3012) on the QM7 in Lower Manhattan

After exiting the Midtown Tunnel, the QM1, QM5 and QM6 begin making drop offs while traveling west along 34th Street in Midtown Manhattan. The routes turn north along Sixth Avenue, then turn east along 57th Street in Upper Midtown. Terminating Manhattan-bound buses end service at 57th Street and Third Avenue. Queens-bound buses begin service at 36th Street and Sixth Avenue. Buses looping to-and-from Queens run open-door service between 36th Street and 57th Street/Third Avenue.

The QM31, QM35, and QM36 make their first stop in Manhattan at Third Avenue and 38th Street, and proceed north on Third Avenue through East Midtown to 55th Street. Queens-bound buses begin service at 38th Street.

The QM7 and QM8 do not serve Midtown Manhattan, instead traveling south down the FDR Drive to the Brooklyn Bridge exit. The routes turn south onto Pearl Street, making their first stop at Peck Slip; this is where Queens-bound buses begin pickups. They continue down Pearl Street, which becomes Water Street, to Whitehall Street in Battery Park at the Staten Island Ferry Whitehall Terminal. They then turn north onto State Street, then onto Greenwich Street, which becomes Trinity Place and later Church Street, to Park Place near New York City Hall. The routes circumscribe City Hall via Broadway and Park Row, then proceed east along Frankfort Street back to Pearl Street. Frankfort Street and Pearl Street is the last drop off in Manhattan; Queens-bound buses proceed back onto the FDR towards Queens. This loop through Lower Manhattan is referred to and signed on buses as the "Downtown Loop". Queens-bound QM8 super express buses make a single pick up stop at Water Street and Gouveneur Lane near Wall Street, then turn directly onto the FDR towards Queens.

=== Service times ===
The QM1 and QM31 only operate during rush hours in the peak service direction: to Midtown mornings, and to Queens during PM hours. The QM7 and QM8 also operate only in the peak direction, with Downtown Manhattan-bound service ending at 9:20 AM, and Queens-bound service beginning at 2:15 PM. QM7s and QM8s alternate in frequency during rush hour periods, with only QM7s running at the end of the AM period and the beginning of PM service hours. Three QM8 Super Expresses operate during both AM and PM periods.

The QM5 and QM6 are the only buses of the corridor to operate seven days a week, and operate in both directions during morning, midday, and evening hours between Midtown and Queens. The QM6 also ran during late nights as of May 2020 but has since been discontinued in October 2020 due to low ridership. Their Third Avenue counterparts, the QM35 and QM36, however, only operate during rush hours in the peak direction.

== History ==
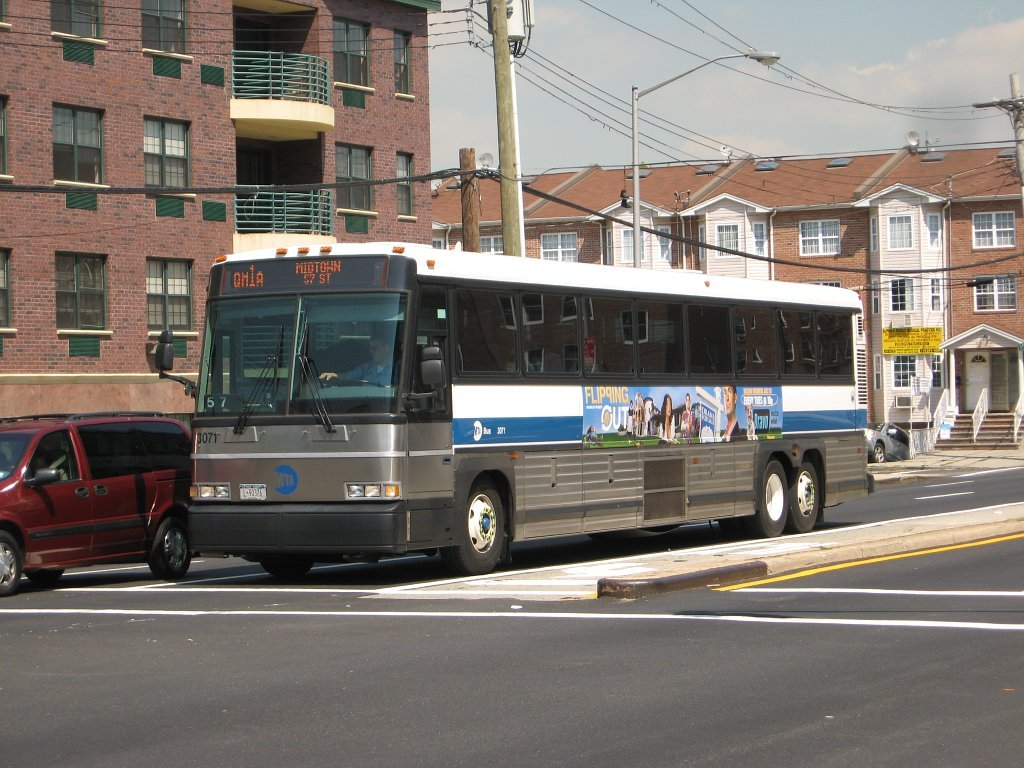
A 2005 Motor Coach D4500CL (3071) on the Midtown-bound QM1A in 2007, prior to the relabeling of the routes

In 1957, the New York City Board of Estimate received a proposal from Green Bus Lines for an express franchise between Fresh Meadows and 37th Street in Manhattan, running via the Long Island Expressway which was then under construction. The route would serve Kew Gardens Hills, Pomonok, Forest Hills, Rego Park, and Corona. This line was never created.

What is now the QM1 began service under Steinway Transit Corporation in February 1968. On February 15, 1968, the Board of Estimate approved an express bus route between Fresh Meadows, Queens and Midtown Manhattan, at the request of Queens Borough President Mario J. Cariello. On February 26, 1968 the route began operating between 188th Street at the Fresh Meadows Houses and Midtown Manhattan, with buses split between Third and Sixth Avenues. The service was a 90-day trial run proposed by city traffic commissioner Henry A. Barnes, transportation administrator Arthur A. Palmer, and the New York Life Insurance Company which developed the Fresh Meadows Houses. The fare was 65 cents. By September of that year, the fare was raised to 85 cents. On March 16, 1970, the Glen Oaks branch began service. On October 20, 1971, buses from both routes began using a new high-occupancy vehicle lane (HOV) created on the Long Island Expressway. By 1976, a branch along Union Turnpike to 260th Street was created.

By 1983, the Union Turnpike branch became the North Shore Towers branch, and service to Downtown Manhattan was added. The Downtown branch, called the "Wall Street Express", terminated at 188th Street and Union Turnpike. Steinway Transit would merge with its sister company Queens Transit Corporation to become Queens-Steinway Transit Corporation in 1986, and Queens Surface Corporation in 1988. By 1990, the QM1 and QM1A designations were added, the QM1 referring to the original Fresh Meadows service as well as the Wall Street branch, and the QM1A signifying the Glen Oaks and North Shore Towers branches.

By the early 2000s, the combined QM1/QM1A service was the busiest among privately operated express routes in the city.

=== MTA takeover ===
On February 27, 2005, the MTA Bus Company took over the operations of the Queens Surface routes, part of the city's takeover of all the remaining privately operated bus routes. At this time, eight different route combinations were operated under the QM1/QM1A designation. The QM1 operated between Fresh Meadows and Midtown or Downtown weekdays only, primarily during peak hours. The QM1A operated to/from Glen Oaks or North Shore Towers weekdays and weekends, with some weekday and all weekend Glen Oaks trips operating via Fresh Meadows to replace QM1 service. On June 27, 2010, the QM5, QM6, QM7, and QM8 designations were created from the QM1A to better allow passengers to identify their desired route. On January 4, 2016, midday service on the QM1 was discontinued, replaced by the QM5. In September 2016, the Third Avenue variants of the QM1, QM5, and QM6 were respectively renamed QM31, QM35 and QM36. This change was done in order to minimize passenger confusion, and to avoid the need to wait for the front sign to scroll to determine whether the bus was going via Third or Sixth Avenue.

Overnight service on the QM6 briefly operated between May 6, and June 2, 2020, to supplement service due to an overnight subway shutdown caused by the COVID-19 pandemic in New York City. The QM6 made additional pick-ups and drop-offs along Queens Boulevard at daytime QM18 stops, in order to replace IND Queens Boulevard Line to/from Manhattan. A pick-up was also made at Woodhaven Boulevard & Hoffman Drive, with a corresponding drop-off made at Queens Boulevard & Woodhaven Boulevard.

=== Bus redesigns ===
In December 2019, the MTA released a draft redesign of the Queens bus network. As part of the redesign, the Union Turnpike express routes would have been replaced by new express routes: the QMT105 (188th Street–Financial District), QMT115 (188th Street–Hudson Yards), QMT134 (Glen Oaks–Third Avenue), QMT135 (188th Street–Third Avenue), QMT165 (Glen Oaks–Sixth Avenue), QMT166 (188th Street–Sixth Avenue), and QMT167 (North Shore Towers–Sixth Avenue). The routes originating in Glen Oaks would have also been diverted to use the Long Island Expressway rather than Union Turnpike west of 188th Street. The redesign was delayed due to the COVID-19 pandemic in 2020, and the original draft plan was dropped due to negative feedback.

A revised plan was released in March 2022. Under the new plan, the express routes would have largely kept their existing paths, but the QM5, QM8, and QM35 would have used the LIE instead of Union Turnpike.

A final Queens bus-redesign plan was released in December 2023. All eight routes that used Union Turnpike would continue to run on that road, although there would be changes to stop spacing and frequencies. On December 17, 2024, addendums to the final plan were released. Among these, bus stops were rearranged on all routes except the QM6/QM36. On January 29, 2025, the current plan was approved by the MTA Board, and the Queens Bus Redesign went into effect in two different phases during Summer 2025. All routes were part of Phase I, which started on June 29, 2025, but the only express routes running that day were the QM5 and QM6 as the rest are weekday-only routes, which debuted new service on June 30.

== See also ==
- Union Turnpike local buses, the Q45, Q46, and Q48 local and rush buses running on Union Turnpike.
