= Utopia Parkway (Queens) =

Boulevard in Queens, New York

Utopia Pkwy
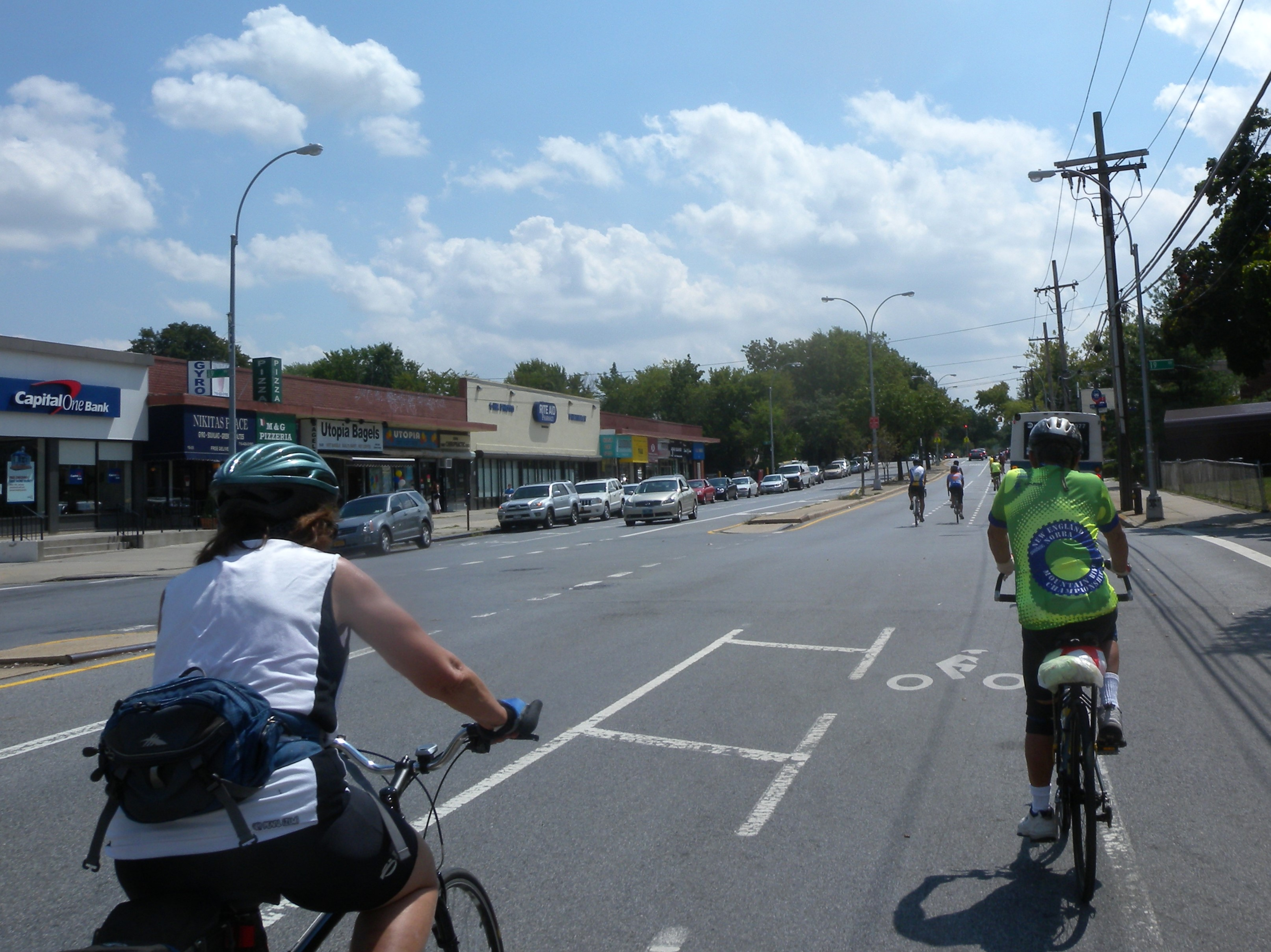
- The parkway crossing 19th Avenue in Whitestone
- Owner: City of New York
- Maintained by: NYCDOT
- Length: 5.1 mi (8.2 km)
- Location: Queens, New York City
- Nearest metro station: 169 Street-Hillside Avenue
- Coordinates: 40.729472°N 73.793333°W
- South end: Grand Central Parkway in Hillcrest
- Major junctions: I-495 in Utopia; NY 25A in Murray Hill; Cross Island Parkway in Clearview
- North end: Dead end in Beechhurst

Utopia Parkway is a major street in the New York City borough of Queens. Starting in the neighborhood of Beechhurst and ending in the Jamaica Estates neighborhood, the street connects Cross Island Parkway and Northern Boulevard in the north to Union Turnpike, Grand Central Parkway and Hillside Avenue in the south.

== History and naming ==
Simon Freeman, Samuel Resler, and Joseph Fried incorporated the Utopia Land Company in 1903. The following year, the Utopia Land Company bought 161.25 acres (65 ha) of land between the communities of Jamaica and Flushing. The Utopia Land Company intended to build a cooperative community for Jewish families interested in moving away from the Lower East Side of Manhattan. They intended to name the streets after those on the Lower East Side, where there was already a large Jewish population. After its initial acquisition, the company was unable to secure enough funding to further develop the area. In 1909, 118 acres (48 ha) of the land was sold to Felix Isman of Philadelphia for $350,000. Utopia Parkway was named after Freeman, Resler, and Fried's unrealized plan.

The part of Utopia Parkway in Auburndale, north of 33rd Avenue, was named Highland Avenue before being renamed Utopia Parkway in 1911.

Utopia Parkway also shares its name with Utopia Playground, a park built atop a filled-in pond bound by Utopia Parkway, Jewel Avenue, and 73rd Avenue. Utopia Playground was opened by the New York City Department of Parks in 1942. It was the site of the Black Stump School and later the Black Stump Hook, Ladder and Bucket Company.

== Transportation ==
Utopia Parkway is served by the following:

- The Q16 runs on Utopia Parkway between Cross Island Parkway and 26th Avenue. The QM20 also serves this segment of the road.
- The Q31 runs on Utopia south of Hollis Court Boulevard, and is supplemented by the Q30 and Q75 south of Horace Harding Expressway.
- Cross Island Parkway splits into two parts at Utopia, requiring the Midtown-bound QM2 and QM32 to use it between them, while Bay Terrace-bound buses turn south from 14th Road.

== In popular culture ==
The American rock band Fountains of Wayne named their second studio album, Utopia Parkway, after the street.

The artist Joseph Cornell lived on Utopia Parkway for most of his life.
