= Dutch Broadway =

- Nassau County Route C62
- Dutch Broadway, highlighted in red

Route information
- Maintained by NCDPW
- Length: 2.38 mi (3.83 km)

Major junctions
- West end: 115th Avenue at the Queens–Nassau border in Elmont & North Valley Stream
- Elmont Road (CR C71) in Elmont & North Valley Stream; North Corona Avenue (CR C47) in Franklin Square
- East end: Franklin Avenue (CR C83) in Franklin Square

Location
- Country: United States
- State: New York
- County: Nassau

Highway system
- County routes in New York; County Routes in Nassau County

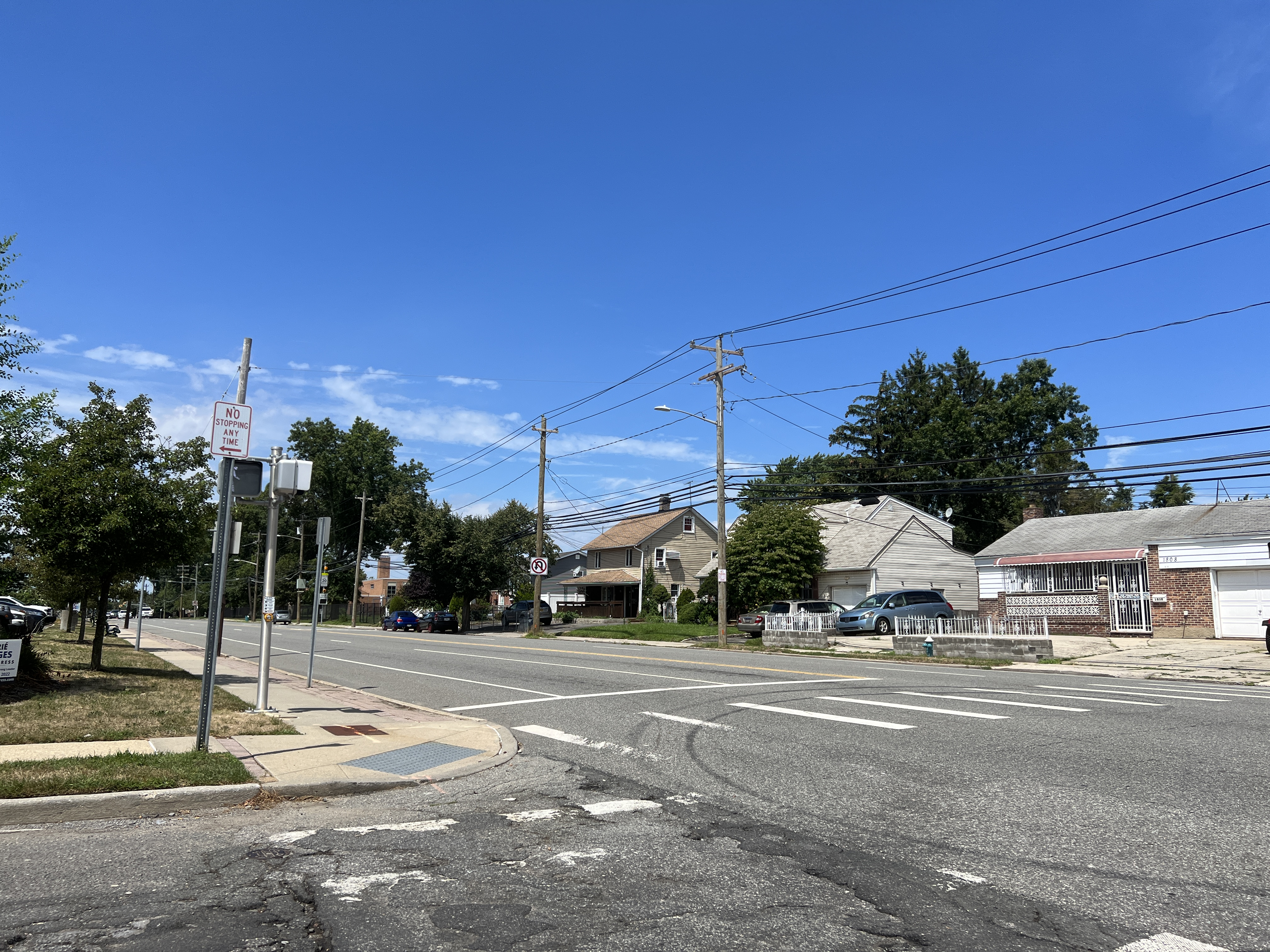
Dutch Broadway (CR C62) in North Valley Stream in 2022

Dutch Broadway is a major, 2.38-mile (3.83 km) road located within western Nassau County, in New York, United States.

Colloquially known as DBW, the road runs from the Queens–Nassau border in Elmont and North Valley Stream at its western end, to Franklin Square at its eastern end. It is owned by Nassau County and maintained by the Nassau County Department of Public Works, and is designated as County Route C62 for its entire length.

The portion of the road between Elmont Road and the New York City line is historically known as Dutch Broadway Extension.

On the Queens side of the New York City line, Dutch Broadway becomes 115th Avenue, and continues west to Springfield Boulevard; 115th Avenue is owned and maintained by the New York City Department of Transportation.

== Route description ==
Dutch Broadway and the CR C62 designation begin at Parkway Drive, adjacent to the Cross Island Parkway at the Queens–Nassau border (on the west side of which Dutch Broadway becomes NYCDOT-maintained 115th Avenue, which continues west to Springfield Boulevard). From Parkway Drive, the road runs east-southeast, soon reaching Elmont Road (CR C71). From there, it continues east-southeast to Crystal Street. From Crystal Street, the road continues east-southeast and soon intersects North Fletcher Avenue.

Continuing east-southeast from its intersection with North Fletcher Avenue, CR C62 soon curves to the northeast before curving back to the east-southeast to intersect Meacham Avenue (CR D49). From there, it continues east-southeast for a distance before curving towards the east and intersecting North Corona Avenue (CR C47). It then continues towards the east, soon intersecting Franklin Avenue (CR C83), where the road and county route designation end.

== History ==
On October 15, 1947, Nassau County officials approved the construction of a western extension of Dutch Broadway. This project saw Dutch Broadway be extended west from its original terminus at Elmont Road to the New York City line, where it would connect with 115th Avenue. This extension created a major, new vehicular connection between eastern New York City and western Nassau County.

By 1949, county officials, citing the increased traffic on Dutch Broadway, announced that the road would undergo a major reconstruction project, to modernize it, improve traffic flow, and to increase capacity. As part of the project, the road's existing macadam blacktop surface was replaced with a concrete one, and the road was widened from 49.5 feet (15.1 m) to 79 feet (24 m), in turn upgrading the road to four lanes.

In 1950, county officials approved the construction of an additional extension to Dutch Broadway. This project extended the road east by approximately 520 feet (160 m), from its former terminus at North Corona Avenue to its current eastern terminus at Franklin Avenue.

In 2023, the County of Nassau approved more than $500,000 in funding to reconstruct the road to improve traffic safety on the road – a longtime goal among the community and government officials. The project will include the installation of improved crosswalks and sidewalks and additional traffic signals – among several other enhancements.

=== Route number and shield ===
CR C62 was formerly designated as CR 100, prior to the route numbers in Nassau County being altered. It, along with all of the other county routes in Nassau County, became unsigned in the 1970s, when Nassau County officials opted to remove the signs as opposed to allocating the funds for replacing them with new ones that met the latest federal design standards and requirements, as per the federal government's Manual on Uniform Traffic Control Devices.

== Major intersections ==
Location	mi	km	Destinations	Notes
Queens–Elmont– North Valley Stream tripoint	0.00	0.00	Parkway Drive	Western terminus of CR C62 and Nassau County ownership; continues west as NYCDOT-maintained 115th Avenue, crossing under the Cross Island Parkway and ending at Springfield Boulevard
Elmont–North Valley Stream line	0.51	0.82	Elmont Road (CR C71)	
Elmont–North Valley Stream line	0.65	1.05	Crystal Street	
Elmont–North Valley Stream line	1.44	2.32	North Fletcher Avenue	
Elmont–North Valley Stream line	1.53	2.46	Meacham Avenue (CR D49)	
Franklin Square	2.27	3.65	North Corona Avenue (CR C47)	Access to westbound Southern State Parkway, via North Corona Avenue
Franklin Square	2.38	3.83	Franklin Avenue (CR C83)	Eastern terminus; access to eastbound Southern State Parkway, via Franklin Avenue
1.000 mi = 1.609 km; 1.000 km = 0.621 mi

== See also ==
- List of county routes in Nassau County, New York
