= Alley Pond Park =

Public park in Queens, New York

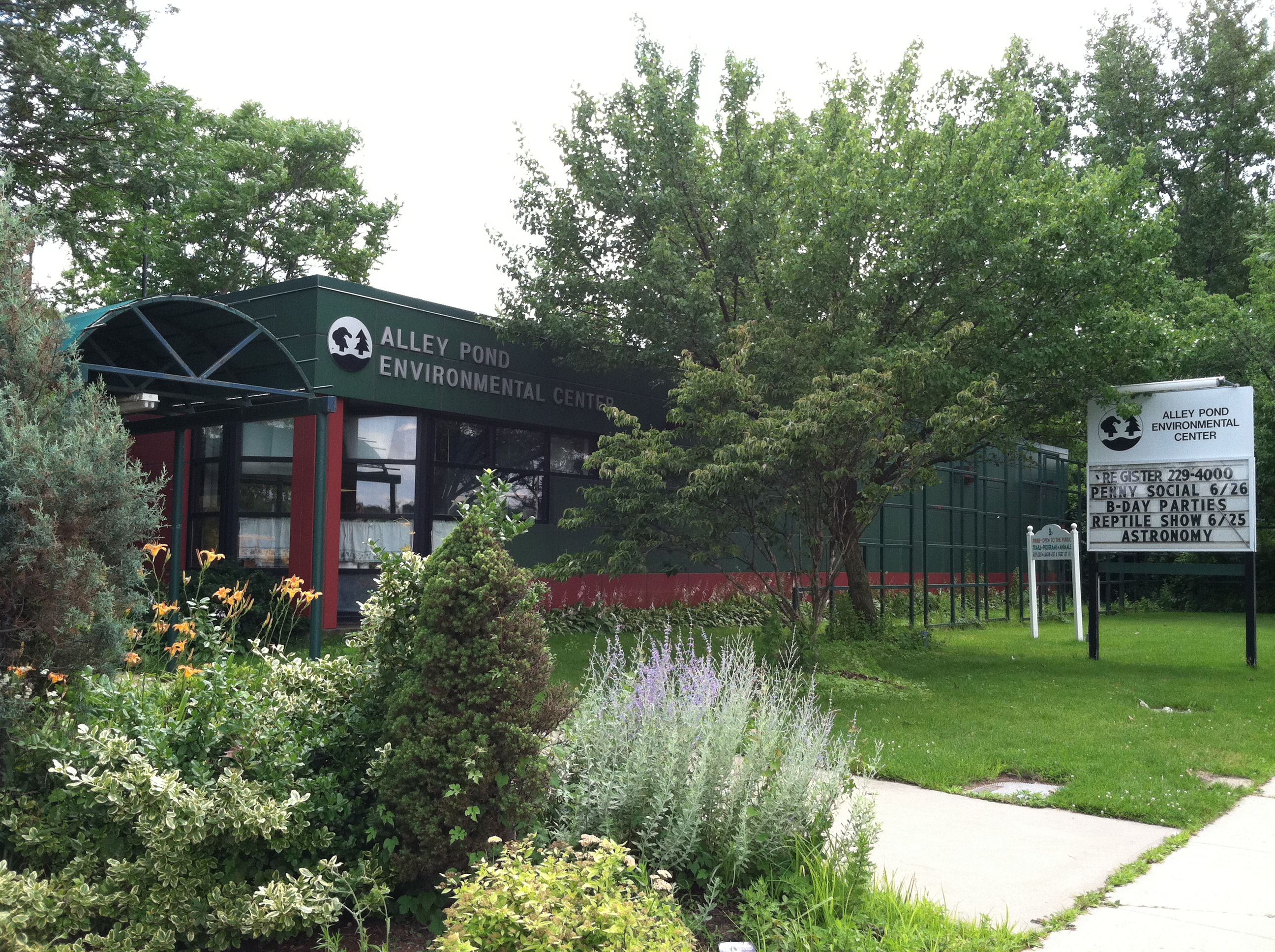
- Alley Pond Environmental Center (APEC)
- Interactive map of Alley Pond Park
- Type: Public park
- Location: Bordering Douglaston and Bayside in New York City
- Coordinates: 40°45′30″N 73°44′50″W
- Area: 655.294 acres (265.188 ha)
- Operator: New York City Department of Parks and Recreation
- Status: Operating
- Parking: 200 spaces

Alley Pond Park is the second-largest public park in Queens, New York City, occupying 655.3 acres (265.2 ha). The park is bordered to the east by Douglaston, to the west by Bayside, to the north by Little Neck Bay, and to the south by Union Turnpike. The Cross Island Parkway travels north-south through the park, while the Long Island Expressway and Grand Central Parkway travel east-west through the park. The park primarily consists of woodlands south of the Long Island Expressway and meadowlands north of the expressway. It is run and operated by the New York City Department of Parks and Recreation.

Alley Pond Park was mostly acquired and cleared by the city in 1929, as authorized by a resolution of the New York City Board of Estimate in 1927. The park contains the Queens Giant, a tulip poplar (Liriodendron tulipifera) that is the tallest carefully measured tree in New York City and possibly the oldest living thing in the New York metropolitan area. The Alley Pond Environmental Center (APEC), with a library, museum and animal exhibits, is located in the northern part of the park, on the south side of Northern Boulevard.

== History ==
=== Site ===
What is now Alley Pond Park was once home to the Matinecock Native Americans, who harvested shellfish from Little Neck Bay. The English began to colonize the area by the 1630s, when Charles I granted Thomas Foster 600 acres (240 ha), on which he built a stone cottage near what is now Northern Boulevard. Mills were built on Alley Creek by Englishmen Thomas Hicks and James Hedges. The valley also contained the region's first mail route, established in 1764. Colonists also used the valley as a route to Brooklyn, the Hempstead Plains and the Manhattan ferries, and U.S. president George Washington is thought to have used this route for his 1790 tour of Long Island. The valley's usage as a passage, or perhaps its shape, may ultimately account for its name; in any case, an 18th-century commercial and manufacturing center there became known as "the Alley". In 1828, the Burhman general store was opened, becoming the only store in the area.

On the west side of the valley, William Douglas (the namesake of the Douglaston neighborhood on the east side) bought 180 acres (73 ha) around Oakland Lake in 1827. The lake itself was named after another estate, Frederick N. Lawrence's "The Oaks": that estate was named because of the many oak trees nearby, and was the namesake of the Oakland Gardens neighborhood on the valley's west side. In 1896–1897, the Oaks became the Oakland Golf Club. The lake itself was used as a water source by the town of Flushing from the 19th century through the creation of the City of Greater New York in 1898, when the city built a water pumping plant on the lake; by the early 20th century, the city took its water from upstate reservoirs.

Despite the valley's commercial center and light industrial uses that dated back to Hicks' and Hedges' mills, the area remained agricultural and largely unspoiled into the 20th century. In 1908, as motorists sought attractive areas for expeditions, William Kissam Vanderbilt built his privately run Long Island Motor Parkway through the area.

=== Founding and early history ===
By the 1920s, with open space becoming less plentiful, the City of New York began setting aside land for parks. Queens borough president Maurice E. Connolly wrote a letter to the city in 1927, suggesting that the tributary of the Little Neck Bay south of Northern Boulevard could be acquired for one such park called Alley Park. His successor Bernard M. Patten also supported the purchase of the land, and Douglaston civics groups argued in favor of the park. After the New York City Board of Estimate passed a resolution in 1927 to allow the acquisition of parkland, the city acquired the Alley site for such purposes on June 24, 1929. Later that year, the New York City Department of Parks and Recreation (NYC Parks) expanded the park into a 330-acre (130 ha) landscape surrounding the Alley and removed some older structures, including the Burhman store. After this acquisition had been approved, Mayor James J. Walker declared that "there is no better site in Queens" for a park. NYC Parks acquired Oakland Lake for Alley Pond Park in 1934.

NYC Parks then began work on converting the park for public use. The northern section of the land became a nature preserve. In the southern section, a field house and numerous sports fields for soccer, baseball, tennis, and hockey were built. These sections officially opened in 1935 with a ceremony attended by Mayor Fiorello H. La Guardia and Parks Commissioner Robert Moses. At opening, the park had 26 acres (11 ha) of new playing fields; the Alley Pond Park Nature Trail, the first of its kind in the city; a 23-acre (9.3 ha) bird sanctuary; bridle paths; tennis court; picnic areas; and a 200-space parking lot. NYC Parks added a 2.5-mile (4.0 km) bicycle path in the 1930s, having acquired and converted Vanderbilt's parkway. It runs west into Cunningham Park as part of the 40-mile (64 km) Brooklyn-Queens Greenway from Bayside to Prospect Park and Coney Island. The path opened in 1938. Part of the southern section of Alley Pond Park was renovated into a nature trail and reopened in 1940.

=== Recreation and pollution ===
After the 1930s, NYC Parks had focused more on recreation in Alley Pond Park than on the park's conservation. NYC Parks filled in much of the valley's marshlands to construct recreational facilities and roads, namely the Cross Island Parkway and Long Island Expressway. The construction of the Cross Island Parkway resulted in the park's namesake pond being reduced in size. By 1954, when the Long Island Expressway was built, Alley Pond was infilled to create the interchange between the two highways; the expressway opened in 1957 The center portion of the park, surrounding Alley Creek, was not developed through the mid-20th century and was considered an "eyesore". A 1959 proposal to add 91 acres (37 ha) along the bay to Alley Pond Park was controversial among Douglaston landowners, who wanted the land to be used for a commercial amusement center. The related legislation was rejected almost unanimously by the New York City Council, with only the two representatives of borough president John T. Clancy voting in favor of the expansion.

The Oakland Golf Club disbanded in 1952 but served as a city-operated course until 1961, after which it was developed into the Queensborough Community College, Benjamin N. Cardozo High School, and tract housing. This contributed to pollution in the Oakland Lake section of Alley Pond Park. In 1969, mayor John Lindsay broke ground on the renovation of the badly deteriorated Alley Park Extension at the north end of the park. Ford Motor Company bought a lot on the northern side of Northern Boulevard in 1968, intending to build an automotive showroom there, but the company's plan was controversial, and was rejected by the New York City Board of Standards and Appeals. Another lawsuit was filed in 1977 to prevent the construction of a tennis spa next to Alley Pond Park, which the plaintiffs argued would cause pollution in the park, though the spa owners won the lawsuit.

=== Conservation ===
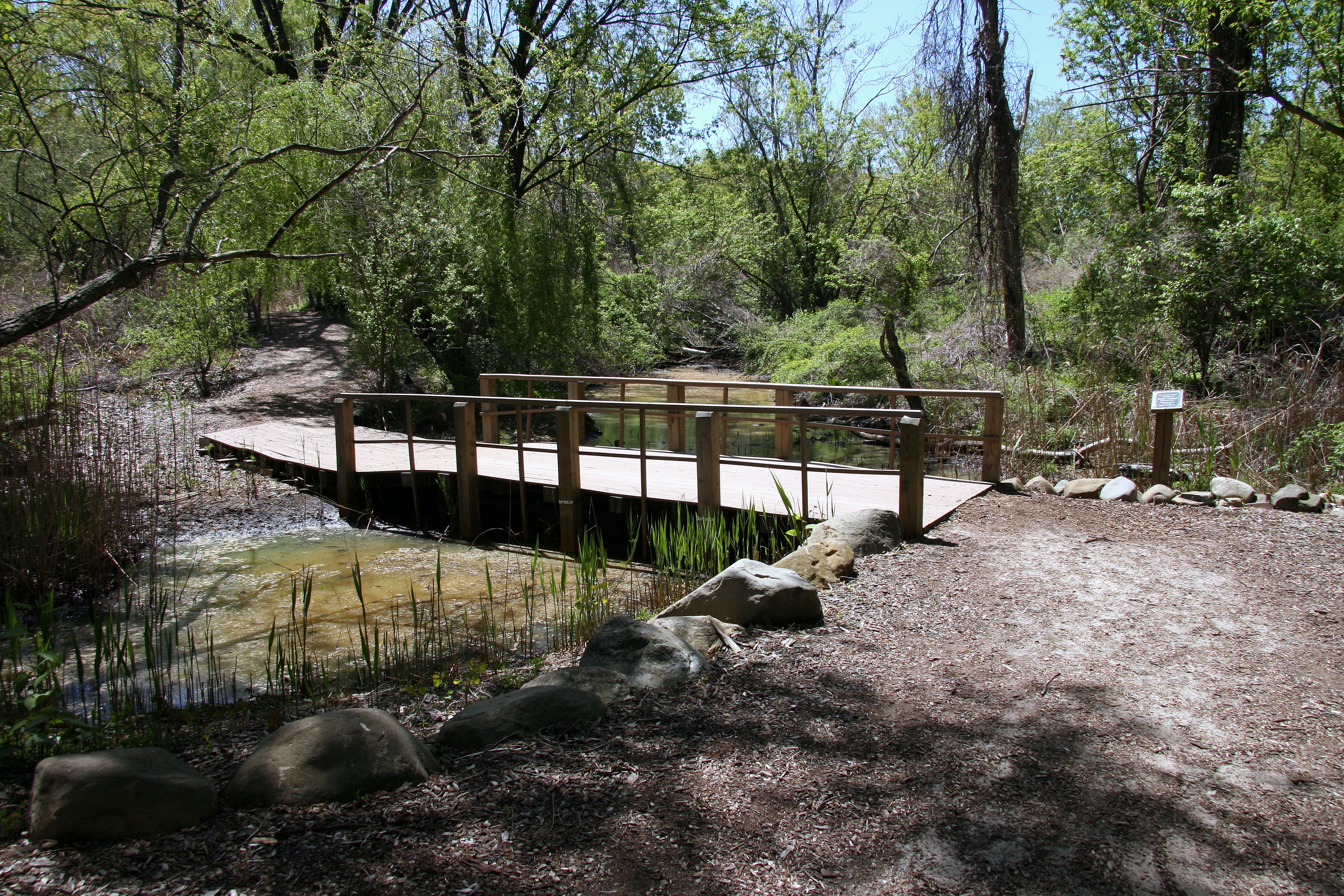
Boardwalk across a stream leading from Oakland Lake to Alley Creek

By the 1960s, civic groups were advocating for Alley Pond Park's restoration. Two thousand people participated in the first "Walk in the Alley" in 1969, led by Queensborough Community College dean John O. Riedl. Local groups also argued for the preservation of Alley Pond and Cunningham Parks. The city's park system was in various states of disrepair by the 1970s, with a maintenance building at Alley Pond Park having burned down. NYC Parks also cut staffing at numerous parks: though Alley Pond Park was maintained by 17 workers in 1970, that number decreased to 11 in 1972. The agency commenced the Wetlands Reclamation Project in 1974 to rehabilitate the park's natural wetlands. NYC Parks also dredged the creek, leveled surrounding areas to eliminate standing water, cleaning three freshwater springs and two freshwater ponds, landscaping paths and trails, and building sound-reducing berms on Northern Boulevard. In addition, some of the park's tennis courts were renovated.

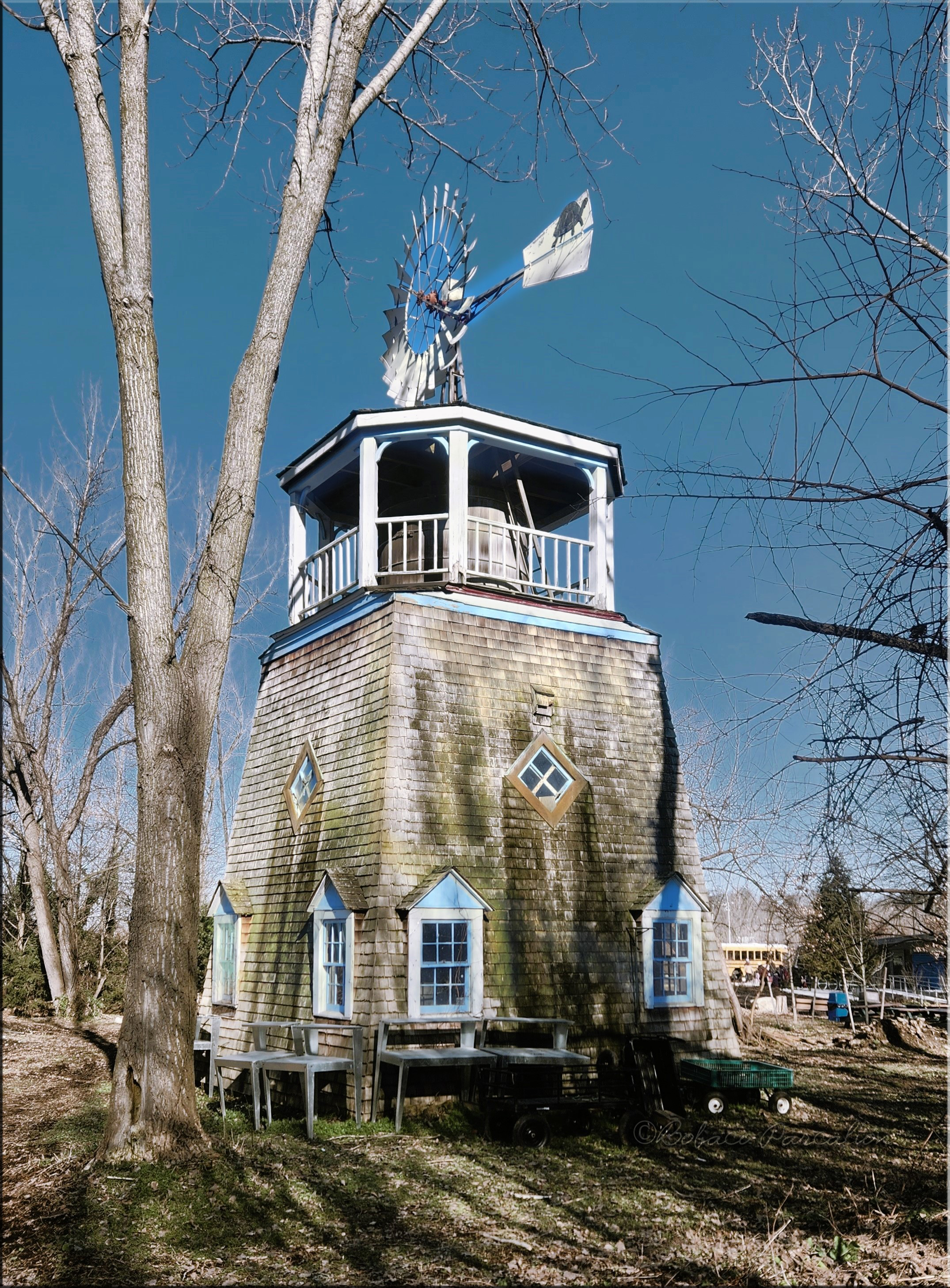
Alley Pond Windpump replica of the Douglaston Manor windmill

The Alley Pond Environmental Center (APEC), founded in 1972, moved to its own building on Northern Boulevard four years later. The city also acquired over $10.9 million worth of land for the park. An 1870s-era windmill 1 mile (1.6 km) away at Arleigh Road, on the Douglaston peninsula, was relocated to the park when the windmill's original site was threatened with development, and was intended to be used as an APEC exhibit; however, the windmill was burned in an arson two years later. APEC volunteers raised money to build a 40-foot (12 m) replica, which was completed in 2005. On the other side of the park, Gertrude Waldeyer led an advocacy group to preserve Oakland Lake, leading NYC Parks to spend $1 million restoring the lake in 1987, with the New York State Department of Environmental Conservation designating the surrounding area as freshwater wetlands the next year. In 1993, almost $1 million was spent to restore the Picnic Grove, renovate two stone buildings, and reconstruct the playground and soccer field. By the mid-1990s, development around Alley Pond Park had led to pollution, including in Oakland Lake in the western section of the park. This led local groups to propose that the city hire an administrator to run numerous parks in eastern Queens, including Alley Pond Park, Crocheron Park, Cunningham Park, Douglaston Park, Fort Totten, and Udalls Cove.

A proposal to renovate the interchange between the Cross Island Parkway and Long Island Expressway was announced in 1995, leading conservationists to raise concerns over the potential removal of trees. The interchange plan was approved in 2000. With the renovation of the interchange, 12 acres (4.9 ha) of the interchange were reclaimed for park usage, and Alley Pond was restored. The project was completed in 2005. The area around Oakland Lake was restored again in 2011. The Alley Pond Environmental Center relocated to a temporary location at 224–75 76th Avenue in Oakland Gardens in 2019, after a renovation of its Northern Boulevard headquarters had begun that September. The renovation of the APEC building was delayed due to the COVID-19 pandemic. The restored complex is now open and tours are scheduled daily.

== Geography ==
At 655.3 acres (265.2 ha), Alley Pond Park is the second-largest public park in Queens, behind Flushing Meadows–Corona Park, and the ninth-largest public park in the city. It occupies part of a terminal moraine, a ridge of sand and rock, that was formed by a glacier 15,000 years ago, at the southern terminus of the Laurentide Ice Sheet. Boulders dropped by the glaciers on the hillsides of the southern end of the park still remain, as do scattered kettle ponds formed by melting ice. The valley features both fresh water, draining into the valley from the hills and bubbling up from natural springs, and salt water from Little Neck Bay. This promotes ecodiversity, with freshwater and saltwater wetlands, tidal flats, meadows, and forests accommodating abundant bird life. Much of the park is part of the Alley Pond nature preserve.

=== Waterways ===
==== Alley Creek ====
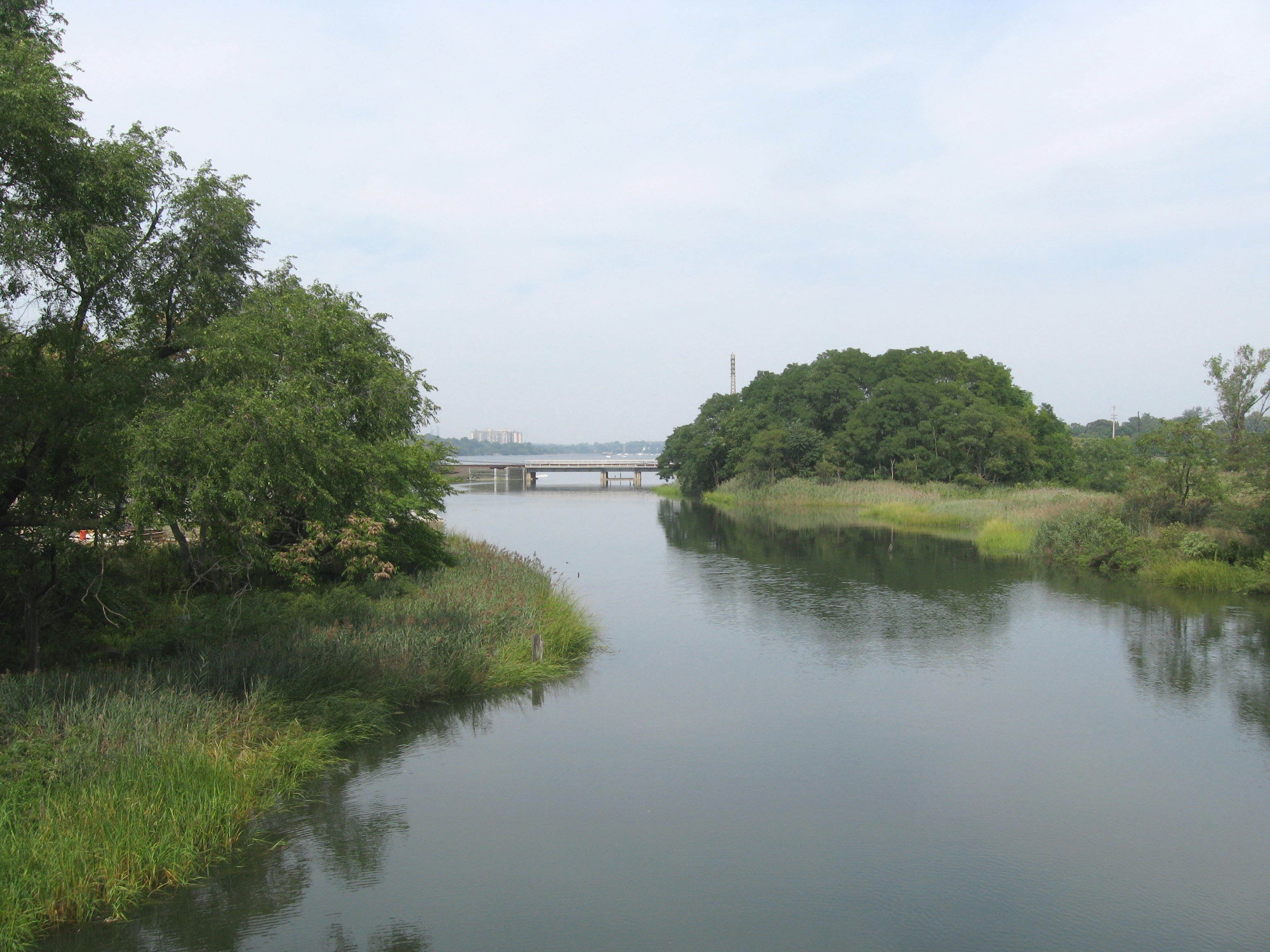
Alley Creek, shown here at high tide, flows into Little Neck Bay, bridged by the Long Island Rail Road's Port Washington Branch.

Alley Creek flows northward through the valley within which the park is located, emptying into Little Neck Bay. Alley Creek is surrounded by some of the last remaining old-growth forest in Queens. The creek is crossed by a masonry-and-metal span carrying Northern Boulevard and a viaduct carrying the Long Island Rail Road's Port Washington Branch. A stream from Oakland Lake, which was buried after the Cross Island Parkway was built, is a left-bank tributary of Alley Creek.

==== Ponds ====
In addition to Alley Creek, there are seven ponds in Alley Pond Park, all of which are kettle ponds. These ponds are Alley Pond, Cattail Pond, Lily Pad Pond, Little Alley Pond, Muskrat Pond, Turtle Pond, and Windmill Pond.

Little Alley Pond is located near the Grand Central Parkway and is the southernmost pond in the park. Turtle, Lily Pad, and Decodon Ponds are located slightly to the north; the latter two are shallow wetland ponds. Alley Pond, located at the southwest corner of the Cross Island Parkway and Long Island Expressway interchange, was historically a rest stop on West Alley Road and contained gristmills and the Burhman general store. Windmill Pond, near the Alley Pond Environmental Center at Northern Boulevard, is powered by a windmill. Cattail Pond, also near the APEC building, is at the lowest point of a cattail marsh that includes Marsh St. John’s wort and swamp milkweed as well as water plantain and arrow arum.

==== Oakland Lake ====
The westernmost part of the park, south of 48th Avenue between Springfield Boulevard to the west and Cloverdale Boulevard to the east, includes Oakland Lake, a larger kettle pond on the grounds of the former Oakland Golf Club (now the Queensborough Community College campus). It is fed by natural springs, and prior to the development of eastern Queens, was fed by a stream extending from the modern intersection of Horace Harding Expressway and 223rd Place. Numerous species of bass, pickerel, and sunfish can be found in the lake, and fishing is allowed. An urban legend speculated that the lake was 600 feet (180 m) deep with an underwater spring flowing to Little Neck Bay, but a 1969 study of the lake found it was only 20 feet (6.1 m) deep.

Oakland Lake was officially used as a water source from the mid-19th century likely into the 1950s. The brook leading to the lake was channelized and later infilled in the 1930s, and the wetlands were partially infilled in 1941. After deterioration in the late 20th century due to increasing urbanization, it was restored in 1987 and 2011. A boardwalk circling Oakland Lake is named after Gertrude Waldeyer, who led the 1980s preservation campaign for the lake. The area surrounding Oakland Lake also contains Queens' first "bluebelt" system, created in 2011, in which runoff flows through natural-looking landscapes rather than through storm sewers.

=== Wetlands and meadows ===
The northern end of Alley Pond Park includes 150 acres (61 ha) of freshwater and saltwater wetlands. Freshwater from further inland mixes with the saltwater from Little Neck Bay. These wetlands host a complex ecosystem with numerous bird and fish species. The John Riedl Wildflower Meadow, named after the Queensborough Community College dean, is located on both sides of Northern Boulevard. It was named in Riedl's honor in 1994 and contains ox-eyed daisies, grey birch, and pitch pine.

== Features ==
=== Alley Pond Environmental Center ===
The Alley Pond Environmental Center (APEC) was founded in 1972 by Joan and Hy Rosner as a grassroots organization that advocated for the park. The APEC building, on the south side of Northern Boulevard, was announced in 1975 as part of a series of improvements across Queens. The building opened in 1976 and contains a library, museum and animal exhibits. By 2011, it had eight staff members and 1,000 volunteers, and its programs had served over 62,000 students.

=== Queens Giant ===
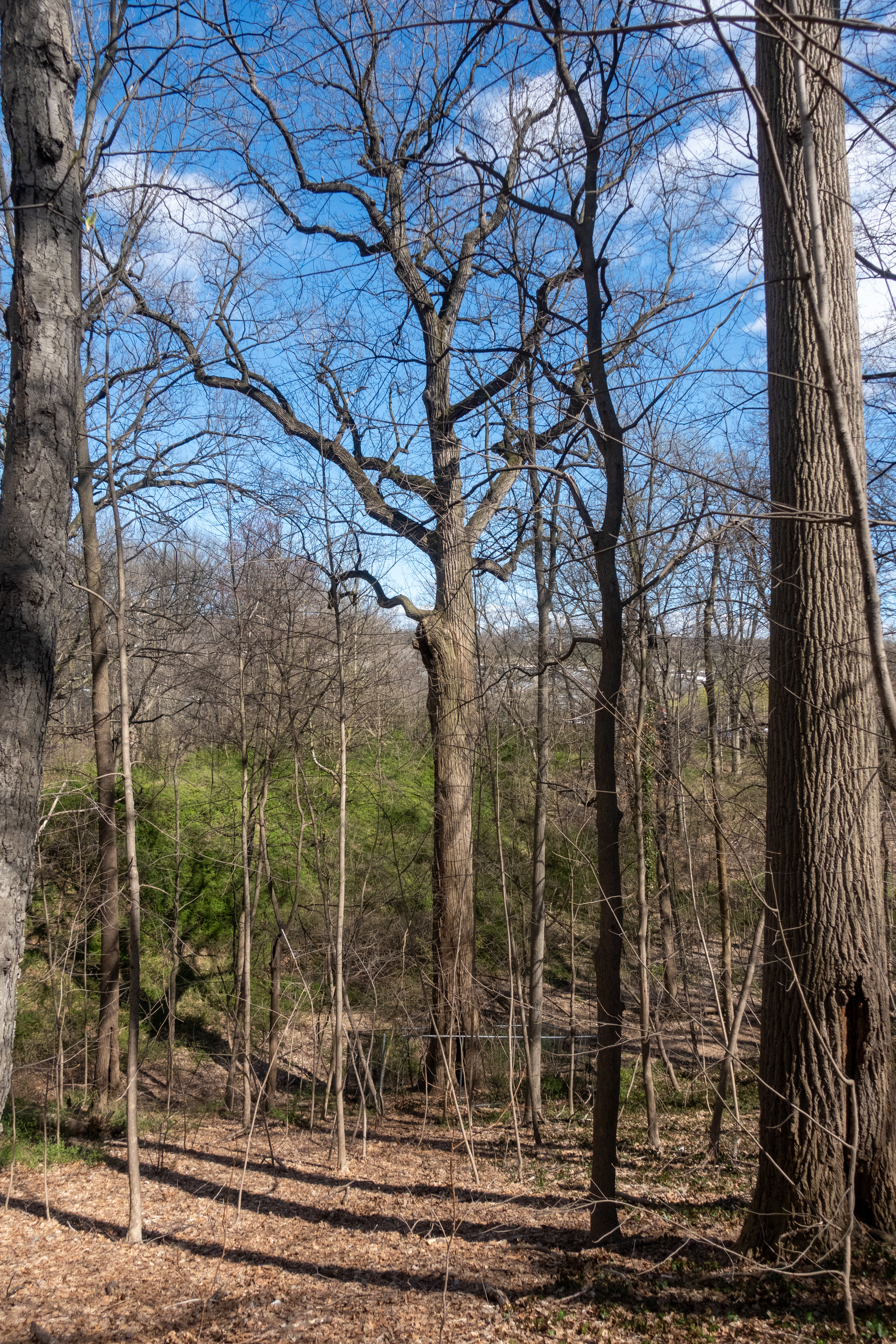
The Queens Giant in 2024

The Queens Giant (also known as the Alley Pond Giant or Alley Pond Park Giant), at 40°45′12″N 73°44′49″W, is an old tulip poplar (Liriodendron tulipifera) that is located in Alley Pond Park. It is the tallest carefully measured tree in New York City, measuring 133.8 feet (40.8 m) tall with a 19-foot (5.8 m) circumference as of 2004, and it might also be the oldest living thing in the New York metropolitan area, being between 350 and 450 years old in 2004. A tree in Staten Island, known as the Clove Lake Colossus, has a more massive trunk, but it is only 119 feet (36 m) tall. However, NYC Parks is unsure of the margin of error regarding the Queens Giant's age, and its true age may have a margin of error of several decades or centuries. Some arborists estimate the tree's age at 250 years, making it younger than other trees in the city. The nearby Great White Oak in Douglaston, though smaller, may have been about 600 years old when it was cut down in 2009, though that tree's age is also disputed.

The Queens Giant is hidden within a grove, barely visible from the westbound Long Island Expressway. The tree is near the Douglaston Plaza Mall, and is accessible by foot from Alley Pond Park. The tree can be viewed by entering the park at Horace Harding Expressway and East Hampton Boulevard, a small plaque at this entrance describes the tree and its history and significance. The Queens Giant is surrounded by a metal fence on all sides to protect it, and a hill and a sign describing the tree stand in front of it.

The Queens Giant is featured in the 2018 documentary film The World Before Your Feet.

=== Recreation ===
Alley Pond Park contains numerous sports fields. The northern section of the park near Cloverdale Boulevard and Horatio Parkway contains Horatio Playground as well as a baseball field, a basketball court, and two handball courts. The central section, at 67th Avenue between 230th and 233rd Streets, contains Alley Playground as well as a baseball field, a basketball court, and four handball courts. Springfield Boulevard between 73rd and 76th Avenues, at Alley Pond Park's southwestern corner, has five baseball fields and a soccer field, as well as restrooms and a picnic area. The area northwest of the intersection between the Cross Island and Grand Central Parkways contains a barbecue area, a picnic area, a football field, two baseball fields, four handball fields, and Alley Springfield Playground. South of the Grand Central Parkway is the Alley Athletic Playground, with five baseball fields, a cricket/football field, a soccer field, a handball court, numerous batting cages, and a playground.

Alley Pond Park also has numerous hiking and walking trails. There are six named trails, which range from 0.7 to 2.2 miles (1.1 to 3.5 km). These are the Red, Orange, Blue, White, Yellow, and Tulip Tree trails; all except the Yellow and Tulip Tree trails are on the southern side of the park, south of the Long Island Expressway.

==== Alley Pond Adventure Course ====
The Alley Pond Adventure Course is at the southern end of the park. Opened in 2007, the course contains a climbing wall, a ropes course, a trust fall area, a zip line, swings, and balance platforms. The ropes courses extend up to 45 feet (14 m) above ground.

==== Alley Pond Golf Center ====
The Alley Pond Golf Center is east of the Northern Boulevard bridge over Alley Creek. The golf center has operated since the 1950s and has 70 stalls. The golf center is especially popular among the Korean-American population of the surrounding area, and signs at the complex are posted in both English and Korean.
