= County Route C71 (Nassau County, New York) =

County highway in Nassau County, New York

Nassau County Route C71
- County Route C71, highlighted in red

Route information
- Maintained by NCDPW
- Length: 2.08 mi (3.35 km)

Major junctions
- South end: Brookville Boulevard / Hook Creek Boulevard at the Queens–North Valley Stream line
- Linden Boulevard (CR C36) in North Valley Stream; Stuart Avenue in North Valley Stream; Dutch Broadway (CR C62) at the North Valley Stream–Elmont line NY 24 (Hempstead Turnpike) in Elmont
- North end: Plainfield Avenue (CR D90) in Elmont

Location
- Country: United States
- State: New York
- County: Nassau

Highway system
- County routes in New York; County Routes in Nassau County

County Route C71 is a major, 2.08-mile (3.35 km) road located within the Town of Hempstead in Nassau County, New York, United States.

Owned by Nassau County and maintained by the Nassau County Department of Public Works, CR C71 runs south–north between North Valley Stream and Elmont, consisting of Elmont Road and Elmont Avenue.

== Route description ==
CR C71 begins at the Queens–Nassau County Line in North Valley Stream, as a northern continuation of Brookville and Hook Creek Boulevards. It then runs northeast, soon intersecting Stuart Avenue before crossing over the Southern State Parkway and intersecting Linden Boulevard (CR C36). It then continues north and intersects Dutch Broadway (CR C62), entering Elmont.

North of Dutch Broadway (CR C62), Elmont Road continues north–northeast. It soon intersects Hempstead Turnpike (NY 24); the street name changes to Elmont Avenue at the north side of the intersection. Elmont Avenue then continues north to (and merges into) Plainfield Avenue (CR D90). At Plainfield Avenue, the CR C71 designation ends and becomes part of CR D90.

The entirety of CR C71 is classified as a minor arterial road by the New York State Department of Transportation.

== History ==
Beginning in 1959, when the Nassau County Department of Public Works created a numbered highway system as part of their "Master Plan" for the county highway system, what is now CR C71 was originally designated as part of County Route 99, with Plainfield Avenue. This route, along with all of the other county routes in Nassau County, became unsigned in the 1970s, when Nassau County officials opted to remove the signs as opposed to allocating the funds for replacing them with new ones that met the latest federal design standards and requirements stated in the federal government's Manual on Uniform Traffic Control Devices.

Subsequently, Nassau County renumbered many of its county roads, with CR 99 being split in two: Elmont Road would become CR C71, while Plainfield Avenue would become CR D90.

== Major intersections ==
Location	mi	km	Destinations	Notes
Queens–North Valley Stream line	0.00	0.00	Brookville Boulevard; Hook Creek Boulevard	Southern terminus of CR C71 designation
North Valley Stream	0.35	0.56	Stuart Avenue	
North Valley Stream	0.48	0.77	Linden Boulevard (CR C36)	
North Valley Stream–Elmont line	0.89	1.43	Dutch Broadway (CR C62)	
Elmont	1.95	3.14	NY 24 (Hempstead Turnpike) – New York, East Farmingdale	At-grade intersection; name changes to Elmont Avenue on the north side of intersection
Elmont	2.08	3.35	Plainfield Avenue (CR D90)	Northern terminus of CR C71 designation; Elmont Avenue becomes Plainfield Avenue, bearing the CR D90 designation
1.000 mi = 1.609 km; 1.000 km = 0.621 mi: Route transition

== Transportation ==
As of September 2025, one Nassau Inter-County Express (NICE) bus route travels along Elmont Road: the n1. This bus route travels along the entire road and runs between Jamaica, Queens and Hewlett.

== See also ==
- List of county routes in Nassau County, New York
- Covert Avenue
