= Udalls Cove =

Marshland and wetland area in Queens, New York, U.S.

Coordinates: 40°46′40.1″N 73°44′42″W

Udalls Cove is a marshland and wetland area located in Queens, New York City, off Little Neck Bay between Douglaston and Little Neck Bay. It is one of the few remaining salt marshes on the North Shore in the Metropolitan area; another being the salt marsh southwest of the cove, at Alley Pond Park. For many years, activists and locals have struggled to ensure that these marshlands and wetlands were properly preserved in their natural state by preventing development in the region. These marshlands/wetlands are home to bird and animal life such as muskrats, egrets, and herons, as well as marine life and plants. One of the key agitators to preserve Udall's Cove and its plant and animal Life was Aurora Gareiss, founder of the Udalls Cove Preservation Committee.

The marsh wetlands of Udalls Cove measure up to 100 acres (40 ha). The cove is a haven for birds and underwater life, as well as a favorite spot for school children with an interest in studying them. It contains a 15-acre oblong ravine, which was left behind as a remnant of the Ice Age by a glacier. The ravine measures 200 feet wide, between backyards of single-family homes, and has fresh-water streams in it that feed Udalls Cove.

== Udalls Cove Wildlife Preserve Park ==
On November 8, 1960, the Parks and Recreation Land Acquisition Bond Act of 1960 was approved by the electorate. December 15, 1960 was the day in which the Board Estimate approved the "New York City Zoning Resolution of 1961;" it went into effect the very next day. The Great Neck Estates Village Board paid $400,000 for 53 acres of marshland in Nassau County, bordering Udalls Cove in March 1967. On October 20, 1969, the Udalls Cove Preservation Committee was established and its first meeting was held the day after that. On May 12, 1970, the first meeting of the newly formed Mayor's Committee on the Environment was held in the Blue Room of City Hall: Aurora Gareiss was a charter member. An ecological evaluation of Udalls Cove was conducted on August 21, 1970, after the City Commissioner of Parks made a request to the New York State Department of Environmental Conservation (DEC). In November 1970, an "Ecological Report on Udalls Cove" (prepared by Anthony S. Taormina) was sent from the NYS DEC to the City Commissioner of Parks. In June 1971, Habitat 2000 presented a proposal to establish the "Terminal Moraine Natural Area System" by linking the City Park areas in Queens from Cunningham Park to Udalls Cove with walking, equestrian, cycling paths: this group (which included John W. Kominski, chairman and Andrew M. Greller, Co-chairman) sought to establish the position of "Curator of the Terminal Moraine" in the parks.

== Udalls Cove Preservation Committee ==
The Udalls Cove Preservation Committee, Inc. was established to serve a number of purposes related to preservation of the Udall's Cove Park Preserve. Along with Aurora Gareiss, the two other directors included Ralph Kamhi and Charles J. Stressler.

== Development and man-made threats ==
In the Daily News article entitled Planners Expected to Approve a Wetland Park, around 50% of these productive marshlands have already been destroyed by man's encroachments or interference into these natural resources.

John W. Kominski notes, in his Letter - Audubon Magazine, the wetlands (of Udalls Cove) had become an area of abuse and misunderstanding, and must therefore be protected and realized as a primary producer of food stuffs. The writer of the article From Here to Eternity (also a part of the Aurora Gareiss Collection at the Queens Borough Public Library) has noted how "Fifteen dump trucks stood ready to 'improve' the landscape." The word "improve" in this case was referring to how those in charge sought to dispose of these materials in Udalls Cove. However, this article also stated: "Between them and the myriad of marine life forms they would doom stood a handful of people." This was "a confrontation" between "those who considered it important to preserve the biotic integrity of a salt-water marsh, and those who considered it expendable in favor of a parking lot or a golf course. This temporary halt awoke America to the kind of choice we must make for eternity. Although this did not necessarily put an end to parking lots and golf courses, it was hoped that after a public hearing in 1970, this temporary halt would become permanent.

In 1970, Secretary of the Interior Stewart L. Udall, in response to environmental damages and dumping, stated "All too often this is simply because public conscience hasn't been given the basic ecological understanding so necessary to selection of the right alternative.

In the article/ letter, "Notes About Udalls Cove," the writer (Ralph Kumhi) explains how development is a dangerous and destructive element that ignores the benefits of nature. Years ago, Udalls Cove was (nearly) eliminated by a golf course; Mr. Sheldon Lobel, an attorney from Woodside, represented two developers who wanted to eliminate a ravine, a "hazardous eyesore," by building an enclosed mall opposite St. Anastasia Church on Northern Boulevard. Zoning was and is still one such element/ factor, and is a line of defense which behind which neighborhoods retain their identities, as well as their moral, spiritual, or real estate values. Virginia Dent of Douglaston, however, opposed, this plan and stated "We're very upset and we feel it's a rape of the community. It's all right for the Church to make money, but not at the expense of the environment." According to the Reverend William T. Smith, a pastor of St. Anastasia's Roman Catholic Church, the Church bought this property as a site for a high school. However, they decided to sell it without realizing the goal or intent of the developers' project. Joseph F. Melston, director of conservation and environmental education for the New York City Department of Parks stated that the construction must be stopped in any area of the ravine, as this development would impair the natural drainage pattern of the area, accelerate erosion, add pollutants to the bay, and drive away wildlife.

According to a Daily News article, 50% of these productive marshlands have already been destroyed by man's encroachments/ interference into these natural resources.

During the early 1980s, plans for a sewer to be built through Alley Pond Park, a four-story motel and an apartment building on the park's perimeter were either approved or proposed within a few months. Aurora Gareiss stated, in response to how she feared her efforts may have been for naught, "Every time we have gone one step forward, we seem to have gone two steps backward."

== Significant plant and animal life, and the importance of Udalls Cove ==
According to John W. Kominski in his Letter - Audubon Magazine, found at the Queens Borough Public Library's collection, the wetlands of Udalls Cove were described as "not only the natural habitat of muskrats, egrets, and the Great Blue Heron; They are also part of the complex biological system which insures human survival." He further explains that the unique elements found within salt marshes like those in Udalls Cove/Little Neck Bay provide astonishing amounts of nutrients, which sustain a diversity of marine plants and animals that populate such this area. Furthermore, he states that as each acre of marsh is lost or depleted, the more likely commercial and fishery resources will decline and become more scarce.

In John Toscano's article Planners Expected to Approve a Wetland Park, Aurora Gareiss stated that Udalls Cove was "still full of fish and wild life which must be preserved and defended against further development and thus from further destruction." She also described this marshland as both a tidal marsh and "part of the cradle of life."

In a letter to Aurora Gareiss, Robert C. Murphy described how only 65% of the Long Island salt marsh remained and could not be allowed to disappear.

Another resource, a newspaper entitled Revolutions Stand Up for Swamp, states how William Brooks, a teacher at Elmont High School, denotes that the marsh feeds 20,000 ducks of Little Neck Bay, and that a person can witness the movements of egrets, herons, Canada geese, marsh wrens, pheasants, possums and other such animals on a quiet afternoon.

The marshes of Udalls Cove also serve and are considered to be a natural erosion control and hurricane and storm buffer for the mainland.

== Plans for preservation and conservation ==
In Charlotte Ames' 1970 article, Queens youths have made it their responsibility to understand the beauty and usefulness of Udalls Cove and alerted residents within Douglaston and Great Neck Estates to the urgency of saving this natural marshland. In order to save the marshland, two solutions have been proposed: 1)The Urban Ecology Club at Louis Pasteur Junior High School in Little Neck distributed flyers explaining to Queens residents that the marshlands must be protected and why. These flyers emphasized and detailed that 500 million pounds of the nation's food fish are sustained by the food resources of tidal marshes like those of Udalls Cove; 2) Kevin Wolfe, a 16-year-old, persuaded an unidentified adult to buy $900 worth of Great Neck Estates by the Great Neck Estates Marshland Preservation Committee. There were approximately 1,200 copies (40 pages of photographs and articles) that were distributed. Each of these articles and photographs detailed the significance of the marshes and plead that those remaining must not be destroyed.

Mrs. Aurora Gareiss, president of Udalls Cove Preservation Committee, knowing full well the significance of both the marshlands and its inhabitants, declared: "We believe this precious remaining cove, with its upland and marshes, its fresh water streams and its fine springs and wild life, should be saved in its natural state for our present and future generations."

In his letter to Mrs. Gareiss, Attorney General Louis Lefkowitz stated that he was recommending to the Legislative Bills, in order to place all jurisdiction over wetlands in the State Departments of Environmental Conservation to prevent further dredging and filling by municipalities. He also proposed bills which would forbid airports from extending into wetland areas, to require a State permit for dredging or placing fill in wetlands and to establish district environmental boards with authority to restrict construction or development with adverse environmental consequences.

In his article, Robert Claiborne states how there have been a few small successes in the battle to block the wholesale destruction of the wetlands. One such success was how a Douglaston area citizens' group marched with hundreds of supporters in February 1971 to the marshes of Udalls Cove in Little Neck Bay. They succeeded in saving 100 acres of the cove from being converted into a golf course and parking lot.

Back in 1972, Queens Borough President Manes asked the City Planning Commission to approve the creation of a 30-acre "wetland park" in the Douglaston-Little Neck area: this project included Udalls Cove. During a public hearing, two speakers favored this proposal. The park was to consist of an irregular tract bounded by the Long Island Railroad tracks, Douglas Road (Bayshore Blvd.), Little Neck Parkway, and Little Neck Bay. President Manes explained how this park would serve as a natural park which excluded ball fields and playgrounds, and it would protect the last marshland in Queens outside of Jamaica Bay. Claire Shulman, Chairman of Community Planning Board II, told the planners that her board had already unanimously approved the park and urged quick adoption of the proposal.

In August 1973, the Tri-State Regional Planning Commission published/issued a report stating that the ravine in Udalls Cove must be preserved "because of its ecological importance in maintaining the fresh water and nutrient inputs to Udalls Cove and Little Neck Bay: it serves as a watershed for the Douglaston-Little Neck area.

Malcolm Wilson, in hopes of arousing support and conserving the environment, sent Aurora Gareiss a letter, on which the envelope cover was inscribed "Preserve the Environment."

In his letter to Aurora Gareiss, Martin Lang described man as greedy and ignorant, and how valiant voices like that of Mrs. Gareiss try to protect man from himself. He described how those in the city were developing a weapon for the purpose of managing our waters. Under Section 208 of Public Law 92-500, Lang and his colleagues were awarded an 8.1-million dollar grant from the Federal E.P.A. for the preparation of an area-wide waste management plan.

According to an article in the Grass Roots Primer, the Udalls Cove Preservation Committee invited everyone from local communities to take a "Walk on the Marsh." Of the 300 people who came, one was an American Indian who was approached by a reporter. When asked what should be done about the marsh, the Indian replied, "Leave the marsh alone, and it will do for itself what it has done before all time."

In describing her paintings and role in saving the environment, Aurora Gareiss stated there are few people working for the environment. The word "Environment" became the key word to Mrs. Gareiss' changed attitudes about housework and paintings; it also became the focus of her civic activities. Gareiss claimed that 200-300 members of her community assisted her in preserving Udalls Cove. She wanted to become involved with other environmental matters in Queens and globally, believing that a healthy environment is a necessity, especially in a healthy economy and that Udalls Cove is a spawning ground of fish, birds and other animals. All these facts denote the significance of preserving Udalls Cove. Aurora Gareiss is also a member of the Northeast Queens Historical and Preservation Commission, which was set up in 1973 as a watchdog group to protect the wetlands and other natural resources of Queens North Shore.

It is written in the article, Koch Signs Udalls Cove Order, which is part of the Queens Borough Library Collection in Jamaica, that Mayor Edward Koch signed an order designed to protect the Udalls Cove Wetlands. This order authorized city acquisition of vacant land at the edge of the Cove for the possible use as a park and was signed before six city commissioners and more than 500 residents of northeastern Queens. Although the signing of this order seemed like no surprise, its setting was unusual. This was because the Board of Estimate, in September, had approved a resolution that would ease the purchase of the 4.5-acre site. According to environmental groups, the land is an essential component in the preservation of the Udalls Cove ravine, which is under the protection of the 1973 Tidal Wetlands Act. The environmentalists protested the possible leasing of this land by St. Anastasia's Roman Catholic Church to become a fast-food chain.

Aurora Gareiss wrote a letter to friends and members of her committee informing them that the Udalls Cove Wildlife Sanctuary acquisitions were finally continuing again. She also mentioned how the Committee members and the State Northeastern Queens Nature and Historical Preserve Commission were working with the State to ensure that all necessary properties to preserve the Cove in its present state of health were acquired. Gareiss and her colleagues wished to avoid alteration caused in filling or construction. This would have caused irreversible sedimentation and pollution to the Cove and Little Neck Bay.

In his letter, Michael J. Del Giudice thanked Mrs. Gareiss for her March 4 letter further regarding the Udalls Cove acquisition project. He stated that he, along with his colleagues (Mrs. Gareiss possibly), had a plan of action which afforded the area substantial protection.
