= Cross Island Parkway =

Highway in New York

Cross Island Parkway
- 100th Infantry Division Parkway
- Cross Island Parkway highlighted in red

Route information
- Maintained by NYCDOT
- Length: 10.57 mi (17.01 km)
- Existed: June 29, 1940–present
- Restrictions: No commercial vehicles

Major junctions
- South end: Belt Parkway / Southern State Parkway at the North Valley Stream–Cambria Heights line
- NY 24 in Queens Village; NY 25 at the Bellerose Terrace–Bellerose line Grand Central Parkway in Glen Oaks; I-495 in Alley Pond Park; I-295 in Bayside
- North end: I-678 in Whitestone

Location
- Country: United States
- State: New York
- Counties: Queens, Nassau

Highway system
- New York Highways; Interstate; US; State; Reference; Parkways

The Cross Island Parkway is a controlled-access parkway in New York City and Nassau County, part of the Belt System of parkways running along the perimeter of the boroughs of Queens and Brooklyn. The Cross Island Parkway runs 10.6 miles (17.1 km) from the Whitestone Expressway (Interstate 678 or I-678) in Whitestone past the Throgs Neck Bridge, along and across the border of Queens and Nassau County to meet up with the Southern State Parkway, acting as a sort of separation point which designates the limits of New York City. The road is designated as New York State Route 907A (NY 907A), an unsigned reference route, and bears the honorary name 100th Infantry Division Parkway.

The exit numbering is a continuation of the Belt Parkway, with exit numbers increasing north. At exit 25A (Southern State Parkway), the Cross Island Parkway becomes the Belt Parkway (more specifically, the section once known as the Laurelton Parkway). Before its exits were renumbered to align with the Belt Parkway, they were numbered to co-align with the Southern State Parkway, which is why that parkway begins with exit 13 (the Cross Island Parkway was once exits 1 to 12).

== Route description ==
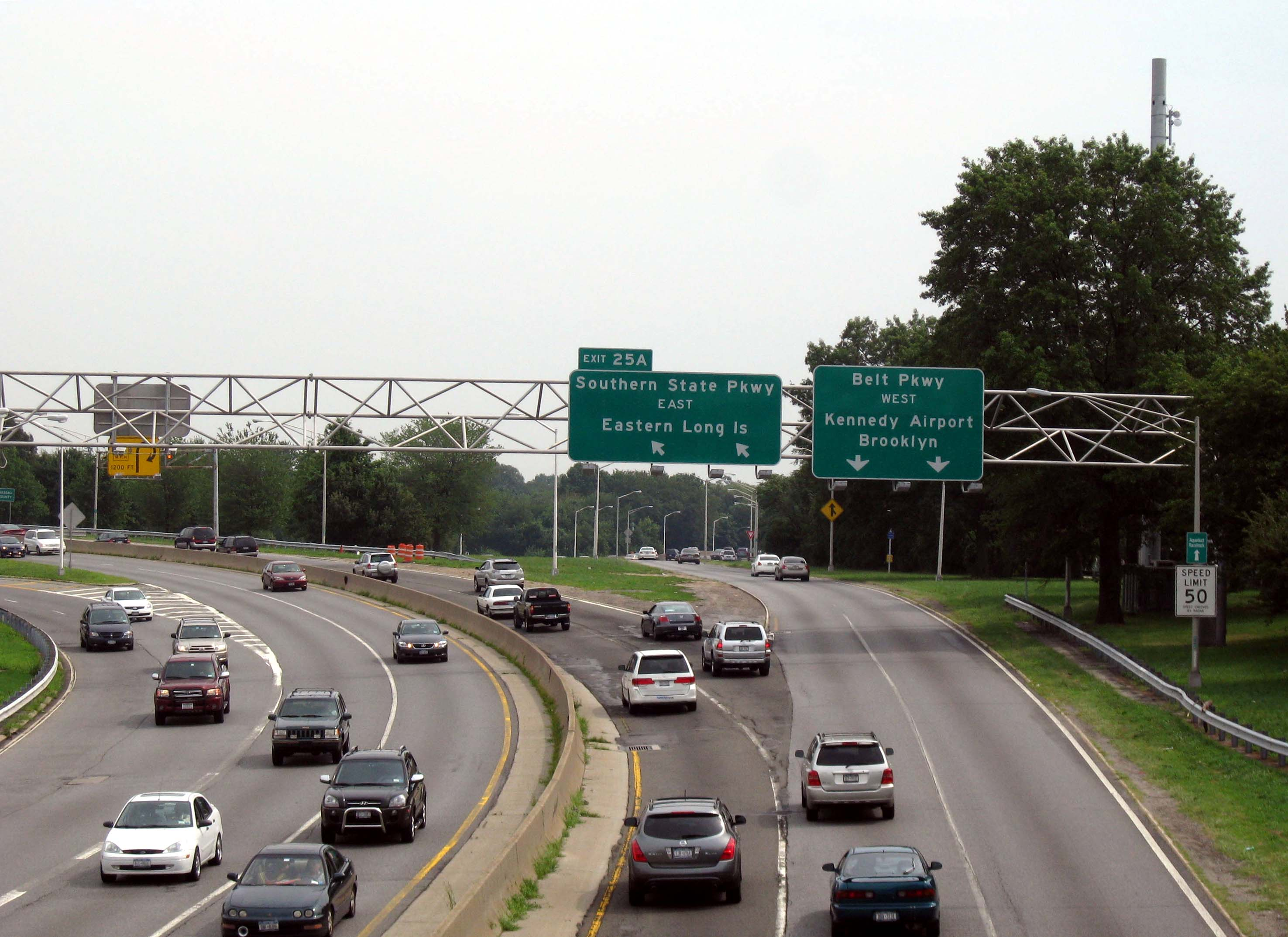
The Cross Island Parkway approaching its southern terminus, exit 25A, which serves the Southern State Parkway and the Belt Parkway in Cambria Heights, Queens

The Cross Island Parkway begins at an interchange with the Belt Parkway and the Southern State Parkway in the Cambria Heights section of Queens. A short distance after exit 25B, which serves Linden Boulevard, forks off the Cross Island. The parkway runs northward along the Queens-Nassau county line upon leaving the interchange, running between Cambria Heights in Queens and Nassau's town of Hempstead (Elmont and Bellerose Terrace) as it enters Belmont Park. In Belmont Park, the Cross Island first passes along Belmont Park Village and enters exit 26A, the first of two gated-entrance exit ramps for Belmont Park parking lots. After crossing under Belmont Park Road, the parkway enters exit 26B, a partial cloverleaf interchange which serves NY 24 (Hempstead Avenue in Queens Village and Hempstead Turnpike in Elmont). Paralleling the race track, the Cross Island Parkway continues north, passing west of Belmont Park's Long Island Rail Road station, where southbound exit 26C forks to NY 24. Exit 26D is the final entrance ramp to Belmont Park and also provides access to UBS Arena and the Elmont Long Island Rail Road station.

After exit 26D, the Cross Island Parkway crosses under the Long Island Rail Road main line then Superior Road before crossing into the Nassau County hamlet of Bellerose Terrace. After the crossing, the parkway enters exit 27, a cloverleaf interchange with NY 25 (Braddock Avenue and Jericho Turnpike) and Jamaica Avenue before crossing back into Queens. A short distance later, the parkway enters exit 28A, serving NY 25B (Hillside Avenue) via a diamond interchange and exit 28B for Union Turnpike via a collector-distributor road. Now proceeding northwest, the Cross Island crosses under Union Turnpike and enters exit 29, a trumpet interchange with the Grand Central Parkway.

After crossing under the multitude of lanes that make up the interchange and the Grand Central Parkway, the Cross Island Parkway crosses under Douglaston Parkway and enter Alley Pond Park. The Cross Island parallels the Douglaston Parkway northwest for a stretch, entering exit 30, a trumpet interchange with the Long Island Expressway (I-495) in Alley Pond Park. The parkway parallels Alley Creek as it bends further to the northwest, entering exit 31, a partial cloverleaf interchange with NY 25A (Northern Boulevard) and the Alley Pond Environmental Center. Past the junction, the highway continues on a northwestward track as it passes under the Port Washington Branch of the Long Island Rail Road and begins to run along the western edge of Little Neck Bay.

After a pedestrian crossover, the parkway passes a parking lot for Bayside Marina, accessible only via the parkway's northbound lanes. The Cross Island Parkway soon leaves the side of Little Neck Bay and passes south of Fort Totten Military Reservation. While south of Fort Totten, the parkway enters exit 32, a diamond interchange with Bell Boulevard. A short distance later, the parkway enters another diamond interchange, exit 33, this time for the Clearview Expressway (I-295) and the Throgs Neck Bridge. The northbound lanes also boast a ramp for Utopia Parkway (signed as exit 34). After crossing under Utopia Parkway, the Cross Island enters the Whitestone section of Queens, where southbound, an exit 34 serves 160th Street and Utopia Parkway.

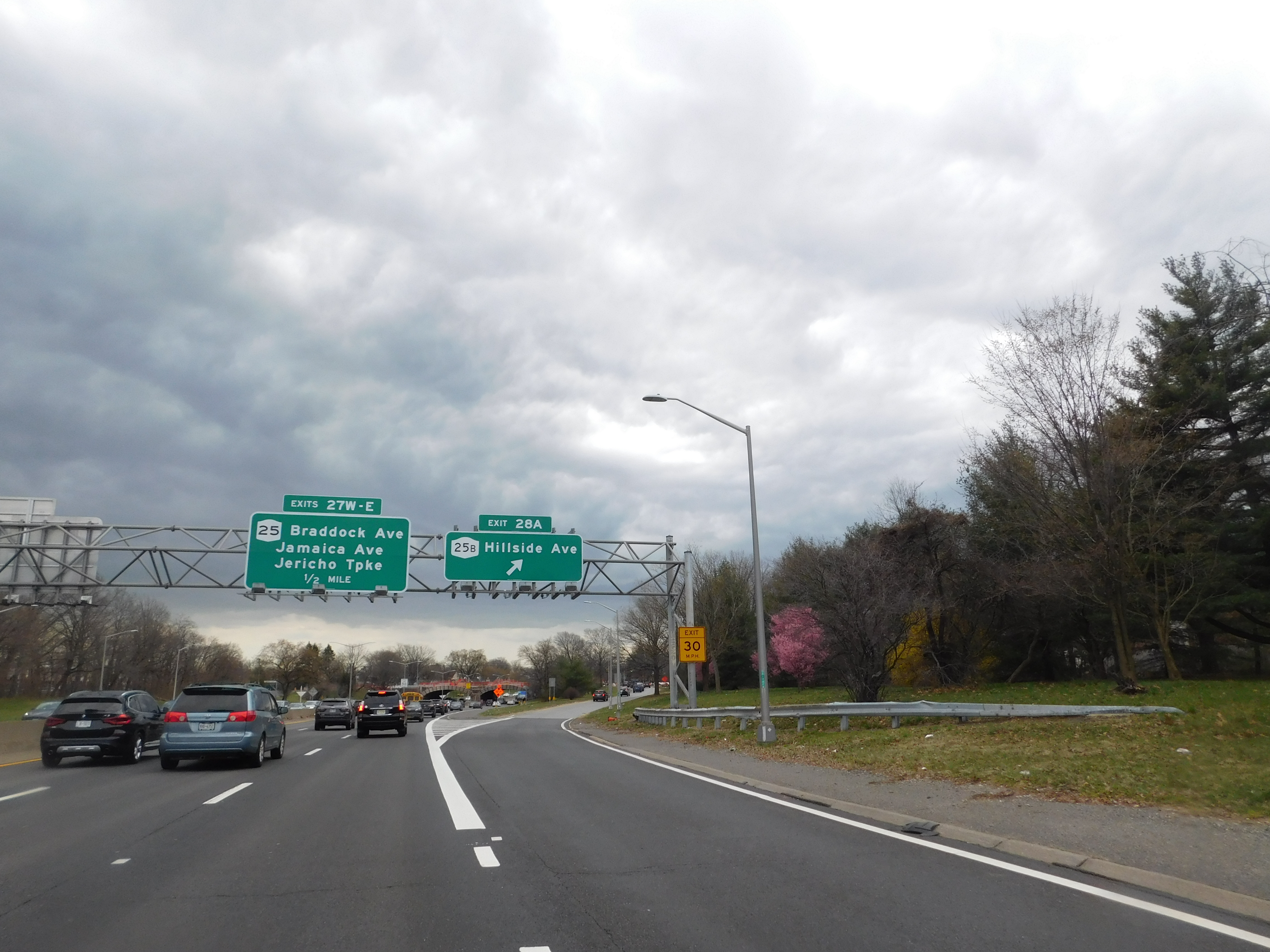
The Cross Island Parkway at exit 28A in Bellerose

Continuing west, the Cross Island Parkway crosses through Whitestone, crossing under Clintonville Street, 150th–149th Streets and 14th Avenue before entering exit 35 southbound, serving 14th Avenue and Francis Lewis Boulevard. After crossing under 147th Street, the parkway enters exit 36, a partial diamond interchange with the Whitestone Expressway (I-678), which proceeds north to the Bronx–Whitestone Bridge and southbound towards John F. Kennedy International Airport. This interchange also serves as the northern terminus of the Cross Island Parkway.

== History ==
=== Design ===
The Cross Island Parkway was first proposed in 1930 by Robert Moses, President of the New York State Council of Parks, as part of a $20 million (1930 USD) plan to construct several parks and parkways throughout New York City. This proposal also included proposals for the Richmond Parkway and the corridor of the Grand Central Parkway. The proposal was held at the Hotel Commodore in Manhattan during the Park Association of New York City annual dinner, which had an attendance of 500 civic leaders. While the group accepted the idea, there were certain complaints about costs of the new projects, which were centered between Queens and Staten Island. The city had about $400 million in borrowing capacity, and that most of these projects should wait and be dealt with one at a time for funding by their importance.

The project for the Cross Island soon became the northernmost part of the 33-mile (53 km) "Circumferential Parkway", a new roadway that would start at Owl's Head Park and run along the southern shores of Brooklyn and Queens. The Cross Island Parkway piece would begin at the Bronx-Whitestone Bridge (then under construction), cross through the neighborhoods of Whitestone, Bayside and Alley Park and run along the Nassau County border until reaching the Laurelton Parkway, which would connect the Cross Island and the Southern Parkway. In December 1937, Moses, now commissioner of the New York City Parks Department, recommended the Cross Island, along with the other parkways proposed in Brooklyn, Queens, Manhattan and The Bronx would cost about $8,026,182 (1937 USD) to acquire land for and that it would erase numerous bottlenecks throughout the city.

In June 1938, the Regional Plan Association proposed 27 new parks throughout the city, including three that would serve the purpose of helping construct the Cross Island Parkway. The first, an approach to the Whitestone Bridge, the city had recently gotten control of, the second; a park along Little Bay, a section of the Long Island Sound that would also connect to the Clearview golf course. The final piece was a section near Fort Totten that also included Little Bay, Little Neck Bay and connecting to Alley Park. The Regional Plan Association, in coordination with Moses, requested these new park ideas as urgent, and would help improve the parkway system through New York City.

The Circumferential Parkway, which would cost $28.5 million (equivalent to $510,500,000 in 2025), was accepted on October 13, 1938; the State of New York and the city provided $16.5 million (equivalent to $295,600,000 in 2025), while the other $12 million (equivalent to $215,000,000 in 2025) came from the Public Works Administration. The city could not take on any more debt to fund the project, leading the New York City Comptroller to recommend that the parkway be delayed. To provide funding for the new parkway, money for a new courthouse for the Appellate Division had to be eliminated, along with subway improvements and additional funding from the 1939 capital budget. The borough of Manhattan paid 66% of the cost, while Queens and Brooklyn each paid 17%. The new parkway would help connect other transportation facilities throughout Brooklyn and Queens, and as a result, plans for a connection to South Brooklyn and the West Side and East Side Highways. The city also appropriated $3.327 million for the land acquisition for the new alignment, plus the engineering work. Moses notified the board that he had $5 million worth of contracts to let so that work could start as soon as possible. The board also accepted the $12 million federal contribution for the new project.

The name of the parkway system was changed in December 1938 from the "Circumferential Parkway" to the Belt Parkway, on request by Mayor of New York City Fiorello LaGuardia, who settled an argument of different names, one of which included using the last three letters of Brooklyn and the first three of Queens to make the Lynque Parkway. However, people felt that name was a bit too absurd and Moses and the city agreed to the new Belt name, and removed the former name due to many people who could not pronounce the former name. Another proposed name for the new roadway, among others, was suggested by LaGuardia, calling the road the Ringstrasse Parkway. The Queens section of the Belt Parkway was ultimately named Cross Island Parkway, usurping that name from the parallel Francis Lewis Boulevard.

=== Construction ===
Almost immediately after the parkway was approved by the city, bids were flowing in for new project contracts to construct the new parkways. The Belt system would be constructed via numerous contracts, which involved grading the new parkway, constructing bridges, and paving the new highway. 66 spans of bridges were going to be constructed for the entire system, with the section of the Cross Island Parkway between Fort Totten and the Whitestone Bridge approach being bid on by December 23, 1938. By this point, already seven contracts totaled at over $5 million (1938 USD). S.J. Grover and Sons, a firm based out of Ridgefield, New Jersey, got the contract for the 3 miles (4.8 km) section. Just three days prior, the city got bids for grading the new parkway through Springfield, Queens, between Arthur Street and Brookville Boulevard, as well as a vehicular bridge over the Cross Island Parkway at Springfield Boulevard and 225th Street. The project went to Petracca and Banco of St. Albans.

In January 1939, the state government received bids for the construction of the interchange between the Whitestone and Cross Island parkways. On February 4, 1939, Governor of New York Herbert Lehman gave permission to let the city construct the Cross Island Parkway piece that crossed into Nassau County. Known as the Bennett-Numan Bill, the bill also required the city to maintain and enforce laws on the Nassau County portion of the new roadway. By February 1939, the project was already 26% along, with parts of the $6.1 million (1939 USD) section of the Belt Parkway system being completed, and eleven contracts had been awarded. On February 24, 1939, the city let a contract to National Excavation Corporation for construction of the Cross Island Parkway between Hillside Avenue and 91st Avenue in Queens.

The thirteenth contract of the project, let on March 10, would pave the Cross Island Parkway from Hempstead Turnpike to Linden Boulevard, a 1 mile (1.6 km) long stretch in Queens, a new separation between 115th Avenue and one at Linden Boulevard. Good Roads Engineering and Contracting Company of Wantagh won the contract with a bid of $597,794. On March 21, 1939, bids were opened to construct three new bridges along the Cross Island Parkway in Whitestone; the Elmhurst Contracting Company of Corona received the contract. On March 22, the city offered a contract of the grade separation of the Cross Island Parkway over the Long Island Rail Road's Main Line and its spur to Belmont Park, along with separation for nearby Superior Road. The project also included paving of the Cross Island between Jamaica Avenue and Hempstead Avenue. The contract went to the National Excavation Corporation. The state also received bids for paving the Cross Island between 46th Avenue and the Grand Central Parkway; the low bidder for that contract was Andrew Weston Inc. By March 31, 1939, the twentieth contract for the system was let, constructing a new bridge for the Grand Central Parkway to cross over Winchester Boulevard and westbound Grand Central traffic over the Cross Island Parkway.

On June 13, 1939, bids for construction of the new interchange between the Laurelton Parkway, Southern State Parkway and construction of the new parkway between Linden Boulevard and 129th Avenue. Landscaping of the new parkway began around September, when topsoiling and gardening began between the Creedmore State Hospital and Laurelton Parkway. By December, 92% of the landscaping contracts had been announced, with the recent section between the Grand Central Parkway and Fort Totten.

=== Opening ===
While construction continued on the Belt Parkway system, including the Cross Island Parkway, construction was wrapping up on construction of the Bronx-Whitestone Bridge, which opened with a ceremony on April 29, 1939. LaGuardia and Moses both praised the construction of the Cross Island Parkway as the important part of the Whitestone side of the new bridge. By 1940, final bids on the new project were still coming in for the Belt Parkway projects, which included a contract let on April 17, 1940 for new fencing along the three parkways. Ross Galvanizing Works in Brooklyn won the contract for fencing between North Conduit Avenue and the Bronx-Whitestone Bridge along the Southern, Laurelton and Cross Island. On May 22, 1940, a contract was let to Frank Mascali and Sons, which paved, drained, filled and graded sections of the Cross Island Parkway between the Grand Central and the Bronx-Whitestone Bridge.

Two hundred construction workers formally toured the parkway on June 8, 1940. It was announced that the entire Belt Parkway system, 34.9 miles (56.2 km) long, would open to traffic on June 29, 1940, with a ceremonial trip along the entire roadway. With a final total of nearly $30 million (1940 USD), the road was complete except for a portion between Plumb Island and Ocean Parkway near Coney Island. The due date on the Public Works Administration funding, set for June 30, 1940, was met, and the new parkway would have Moses, LaGuardia and the administrator of the PWA, John Carmody. The new parkway was groomed overnight by 1,700 workers to prepare for the opening. The general public was allowed to use the new parkway after the special dignitaries car had passed. The project also included the addition or renovation of several playgrounds and public parks, such as Crocheron Park.

=== Later years ===
In 1952, the Triborough Bridge and Tunnel Authority awarded a $920,000 contract to widen about 11 miles (18 km) of the Cross Island Parkway from four to six lanes. As a result of this project, nearly all of the Belt Parkway system was six lanes wide, except for a four-lane section in Laurelton. The TBTA also installed overhead navigational signs at several interchanges in 1953.

The state announced a plan to renovate the Long Island Expressway (I-495) in the vicinity of Alley Pond Park and the Cross Island Parkway in 1995. In 2000, Pataki and New York City mayor Rudy Giuliani announced that the segment of I-495 near Alley Pond Park and the Cross Island Parkway, would be rebuilt at a cost of $112 million. Work started in August 2000 and was substantially completed by 2005. The project included the restoration of 12 acres (4.9 ha) within the park, as well as the construction of new ramps between I-495 and the Cross Island Parkway at exit 30. As part of the reconstruction, two cloverleaf ramps were replaced with flyovers; the shoulders in each direction were converted into travel lanes; and new collector-distributor ramps were installed on I-495 east of the Cross Island Parkway interchange.

== Exit list ==
Exit numbers continue sequentially from those of the Belt Parkway.

County	Location	mi	km	Exit	Destinations	Notes
Nassau–Queens county line	North Valley Stream–Cambria Heights line	0.00	0.00	–	Belt Parkway west – Kennedy Airport, Brooklyn	Continuation west
Nassau–Queens county line	North Valley Stream–Cambria Heights line	0.2	0.32	25A	Southern State Parkway east – Eastern Long Island	Southbound exit and northbound entrance; western terminus of Southern State Parkway
Queens	Cambria Heights	0.3	0.48	25B	Linden Boulevard to Elmont Road	No northbound exit
Queens	Queens Village	0.90	1.45	26A	Belmont Racetrack	Exit open on Belmont Racetrack race days only
Queens	Queens Village	1.30– 1.70	2.09– 2.74	26B	NY 24 (Hempstead Avenue) – Belmont Racetrack	Signed as exits 26B (east) and 26C (west) southbound
Nassau	Elmont	1.93	3.11	26D	Belmont Racetrack / UBS Arena	Access to Elmont–UBS Arena station
Nassau–Queens county line	Bellerose Terrace–Bellerose line	2.52	4.06	27	NY 25 (Braddock Avenue / Jericho Turnpike) / Jamaica Avenue	Signed as exits 27E (east) and 27W (west) southbound; Braddock Avenue not signed northbound
Queens	Bellerose	3.23	5.20	28A	NY 25B (Hillside Avenue)	
Queens	Glen Oaks	3.76	6.05	28B	Union Turnpike	Former NY 25C
Queens	Glen Oaks	4.13	6.65	29	Grand Central Parkway – RFK Bridge, Eastern Long Island, Hauppauge	Signed as exits 29E (east) and 29W (west); exit 23 on Grand Central Parkway
Queens	Alley Pond Park	5.05	8.13	30	I-495 (Long Island Expressway) – Eastern Long Island, Midtown Tunnel	Signed as exits 30E (east) and 30W (west); no southbound access to I-495 west; exits 31S-N on I-495
Queens	Alley Pond Park	5.95	9.58	31	NY 25A (Northern Boulevard)	Signed as exits 31E (east) and 31W (west)
Queens	Bayside	8.10– 8.90	13.04– 14.32	32 (NB); 33 (SB)	I-295 south (Clearview Expressway) / Bell Boulevard	No northbound access to I-295
Queens	Bayside	8.10– 8.90	13.04– 14.32	33	I-295 Toll north (Throgs Neck Bridge) – Bronx, New England	Northbound exit and southbound entrance; exit 8 on I-295; former I-78
Queens	Whitestone	9.06	14.58	34	160th Street / Utopia Parkway	
Queens	Whitestone	10.30	16.58	35	14th Avenue to Francis Lewis Boulevard	No northbound exit
Queens	Whitestone	10.30	16.58	36N	I-678 north (Whitestone Bridge) – Bronx	Northbound exit and southbound entrance; exit 16 on I-678
Queens	Whitestone	10.57	17.01	36S	I-678 south (Whitestone Expressway) – Kennedy Airport, LaGuardia Airport	Northern terminus
1.000 mi = 1.609 km; 1.000 km = 0.621 mi: Electronic toll collection; Incomplete access
