= Crocheron Park =

Public park in Queens, New York

Coordinates: 40°46′17″N 73°46′05″W

Crocheron Park is a public park situated at 214th Street and 35th Avenue in Bayside, Queens, New York City.

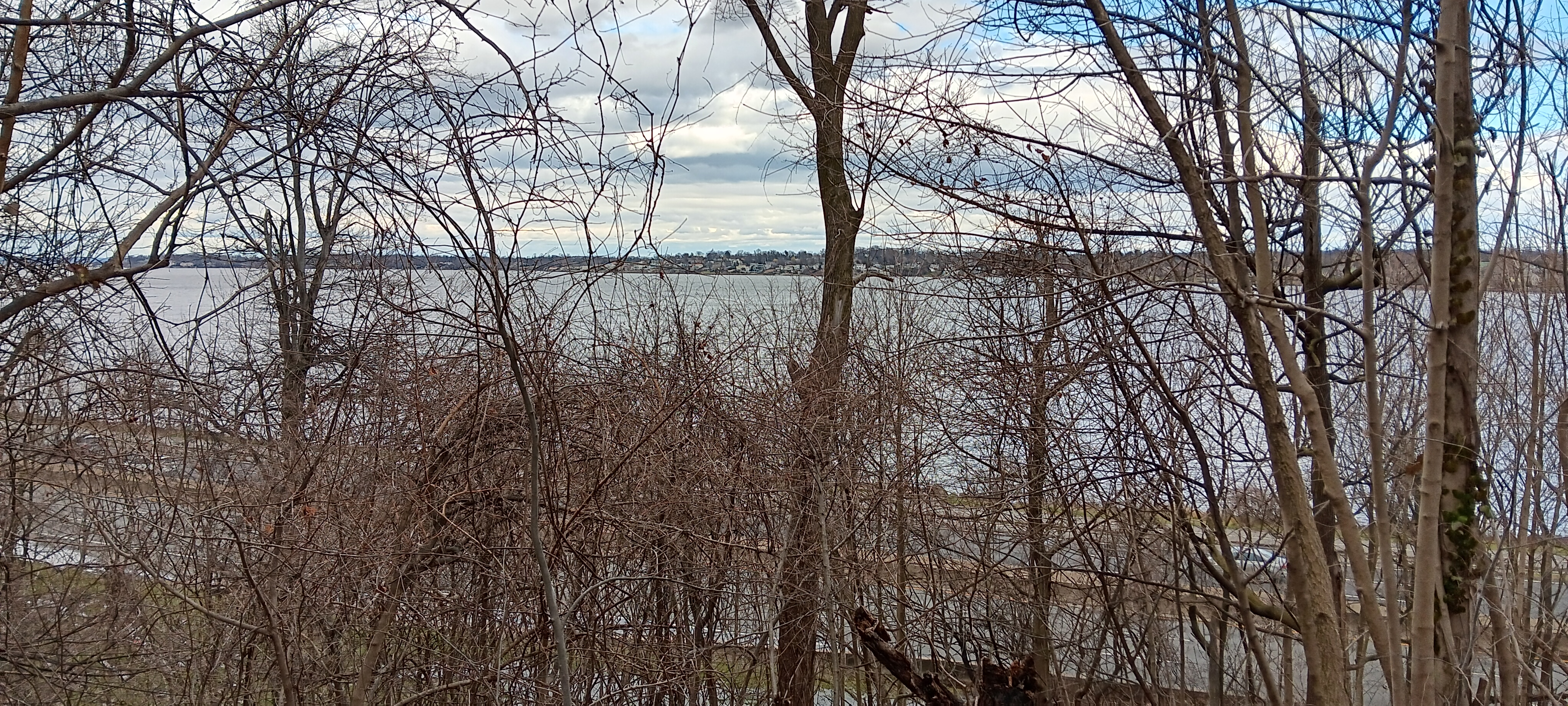
A view from the eastern end of Crocheron Park, overlooking Little Neck Bay and the Cross Island Parkway

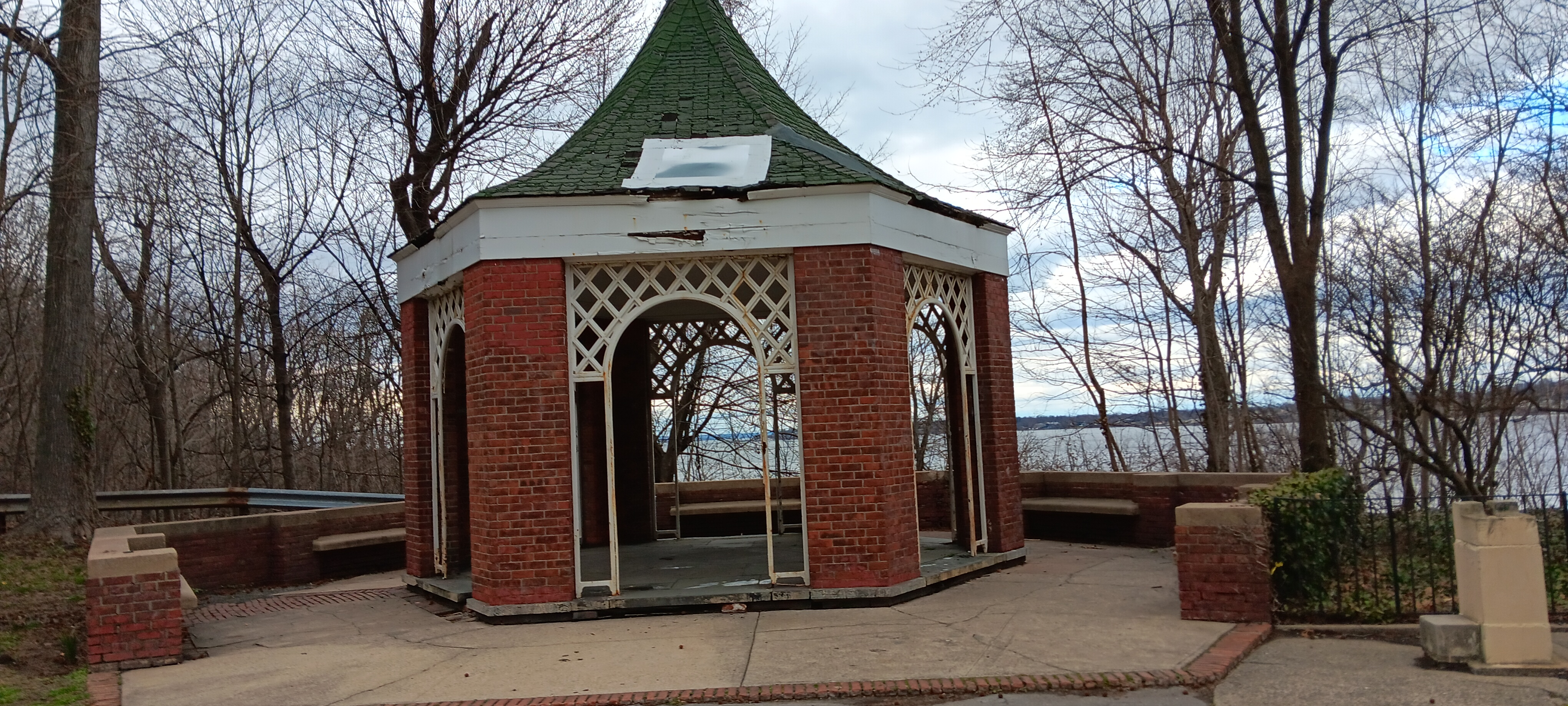
A gazebo at the eastern end of Crocheron Park

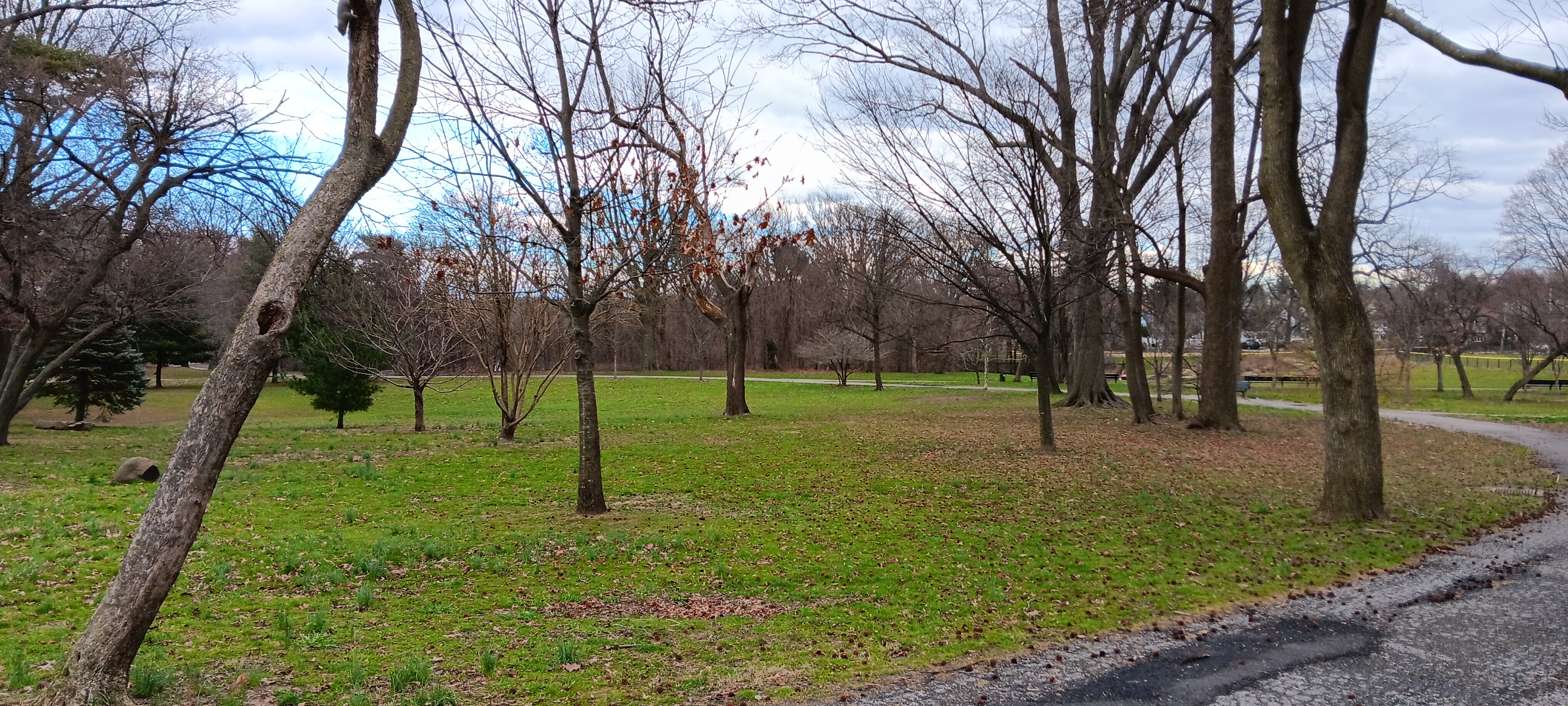
A field, walking path and small forested area in Crocheron Park

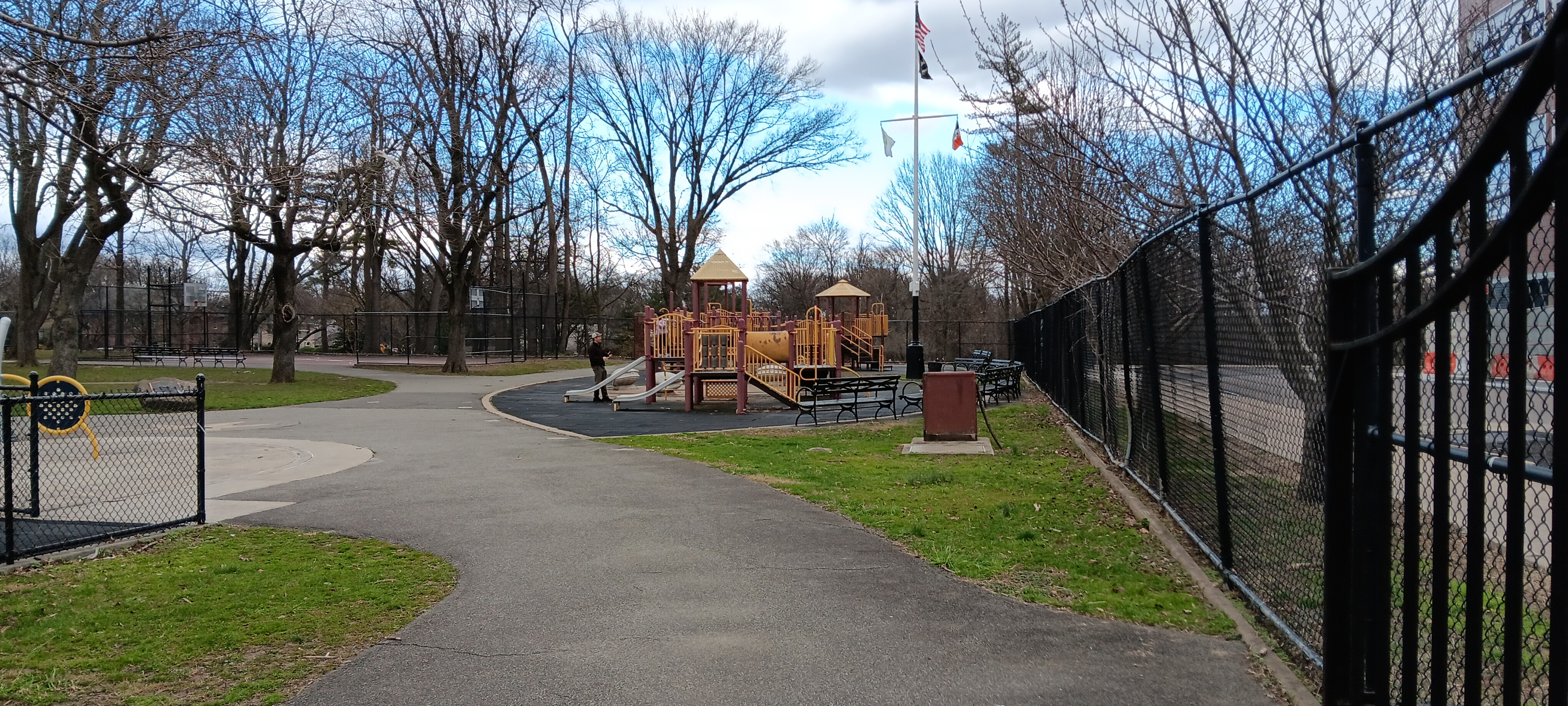
Playground equipment in Crocheron Park

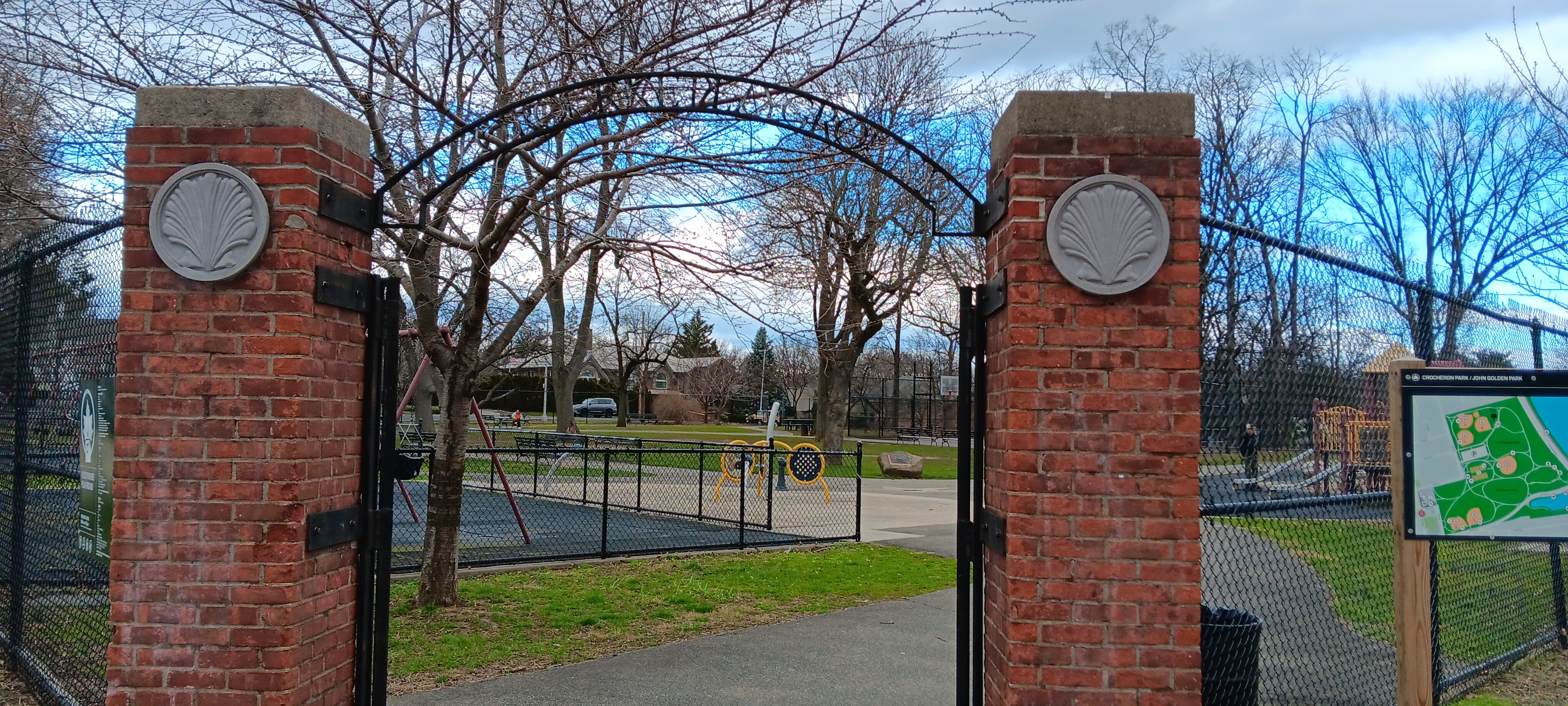
The western entrance to Crocheron Park

== Hotel usage ==
Before becoming a park, the area facing Little Neck Bay was the summer hotel called the Crocheron House, which stood for nearly half a century. The building resembled an Italian villa and included a square tower at one corner, large windows, and a broad piazza facing the water. This hotel, prior to its destruction, drew attention around 1868: this was when Joseph Crocheron purchased Brown's Bayside House, enlarged it and turned it into a watering hole for politicians, theatrical people, and financiers. Furthermore, this hotel included festivals and seafood dinners. This place also became a magnet for a criminal named William Marcy "Boss" Tweed, the notorious Tammany Hall leader, who hid there following his escape in 1875. Boss Tweed had escaped to this place from the Ludlow St. debtor's jail in December 1875 and it was said that Tweed, while heading for Spain, embarked to Cuba aboard a schooner brought to anchor in the bay by his friends

The hotel's owner, Joseph Crocheron, was a well-known and experienced racer of horses along with Cornelius Vanderbilt, August Belmont, and more. There is also a distinct number of Crocheron family members such as John Crocheron, who was a planter, whose will was dated December 13, 1695 and died a year after that date; another was Henry Crocheron (1829–1931), a member of Congress. However, around 1907–08, the hotel was leveled in a fire and was since never rebuilt. After it was burned down in 1908, the community took it upon themselves and raised funds to purchase 42 acres (17 ha) and gave them to the city to become Crocheron Park.

== Park ==
The original parcel of land was acquired during 1924. Prior to its opening, Crocheron Park cost New York City $17,769 for each of its 51 acres (21 ha); it also cost property owners in the local area of assessment in Bayside exactly $181,252.09. The park was to comprise the entire area bounded by Crocheron avenue from 214th place, Maxwell avenue, 215th place, Vista avenue, and other blocks in the surrounding area.

During the 1960s, the Parks Department intended to rebuild Crocheron Park; this included the repair or construction of new tennis courts. The day before this answer was made, the Crocheron Park Tennis Committee issued a complaint that the courts were in a "deplorable state". According to a department spokesman, plans were in motion to renovated the park, claiming it would be unwise to renovate the park, claiming it would be unwise to resurface the courts, when they intended to rebuild them. Israel Kaufman, a member of the Tennis Committee, said a 500-name petition was sent to Newbold Morris, asking for repairs of the courts.

A dedication was made on October 18, 1965, to the John Golden Section of Crocheron Park. The ceremonies were attended by Mayor Wagner, Park Commissioner Newbold Morris, and Mr. Hymes, the sister of the late John Golden.

New York Road Runners hosts a weekly, 3.1-mile (5.0 km) Open Run.

== Events held ==
A concert was held and given at Crocheron Park on August 13, 1965, and was attended by over 20,000 people. Due to the increasing number of fans and audience, those in charge had to make use of two baseball fields. Both the audience and musicians braved a steady rain drizzle occurring that very evening.

On August 6, 1966. a New York Philharmonic Society orchestra concert was held in Bayside's Crocheron Park with a reception of 40,000 persons. People cheered "bravos" for the musicians, for conductor Lukas Foss, and for Marian Anderson. During the performance, there was an orderly incident: three youngsters almost disrupted the performance by firing paper clips at the orchestra from a nearby wooded area. All three of these youngsters were caught by Patrolmen Joseph Leyer, James Miller, Thomas Carr, and Sergeant Andrew Lontos: the youths' names were withheld because of their ages. This summer program was composed of Mozart's "Symphony Number 40," Tshaikovsky's "Francesa de Rimini," Aaron Copland's "Lincoln Portrait," and Ravel's "Daphnis and Chloe." This program was co-sponsored by the Historical Society and Parks Department.

Crocheron Park was used for many other festive events. One such event was Bayside's third Annual American Heritage Weekend which was held in August 1981. The celebration included the day's re-enactment of parts from the American Revolution played out by the Historic Commands of the American Revolution. There were those, however, who believed that none of the day's events matched their desires, enjoyments, or anything related to historical traditions.

Furthermore, Crocheron Park was also used for running marathons. In August 1981, an all-day marathon was held in Crocheron Park and was attended by 19 long-distance runners. This event was hosted by The Broadway Ultramarathon Society and headed by Ben Grundstein and Richard Innamorato who finished third in the race and ran over 77 miles. The race, after 12 hours of running, walking, and sweating, was won by 42-year-old Bob Vandekieff, who covered a distance of a little over 84 miles.
