= Bell Boulevard =

Road in Queens, New York

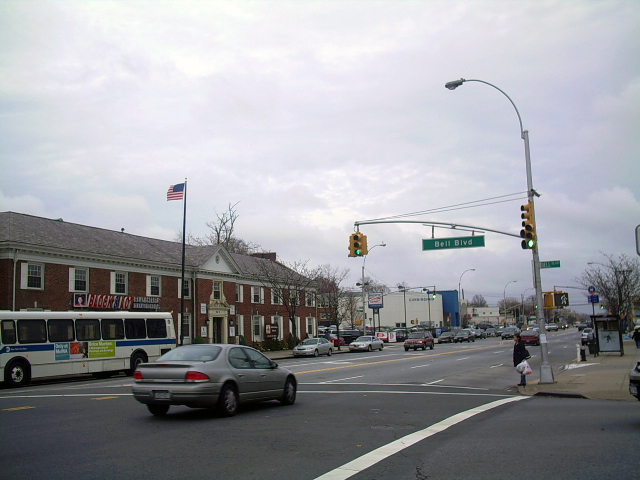
- The intersection of Northern Boulevard and Bell Boulevard.
- Interactive map of Bell Boulevard
- Former name: Bell Avenue
- Owner: City of New York
- Maintained by: NYCDOT
- Length: 4.6 mi (7.4 km)
- Location: Queens, New York
- Nearest subway station: 7 and <7> trains at Flushing–Main Street (IRT Flushing Line)
- Coordinates: 40.760256681696354°N 73.7693411247931°W
- South end: Grand Central Parkway and Spencer Avenue in Queens Village
- Major junctions: NY 25A in Bayside; I-495 in Oakland Gardens
- North end: Cross Island Parkway and Totten Road in Bay Terrace

Bell Boulevard is a boulevard in the New York City borough of Queens. It primarily runs through the neighborhoods of Bay Terrace, Bayside, Oakland Gardens, and Hollis Hills. The street is known for its restaurants, retail businesses, and role as a local commercial center.

Originally known as Bell Avenue, it takes its name from Abraham Bell, who acquired a large tract of land in Bayside in 1824. The road developed from a rural lane crossing the Bell family's farmland into a commercial street as Bayside grew during the late 19th and early 20th centuries.

== History ==
Before European settlement, the area surrounding present-day Bayside was inhabited by the Matinecock people. During the 19th century, the area remained largely agricultural. In 1824, Abraham Bell acquired approximately 246 acres of land extending from near Little Neck Bay to the vicinity of present-day 204th Street. An unpaved road known as Bell Avenue crossed the property, and was later renamed Bell Boulevard in the early 1900s.

Railroad service reached the boulevard in 1866, and the Bell family donated land for a local railroad station. By the 1870s, residential subdivisions were gradually replacing farmland, while stores and other businesses began appearing along Bell Avenue.

In 1904, the remaining section of the Bell family's farmland was sold to the Bellcourt Land Company, associated with the real estate firm Rickert-Finlay. The company developed the property as Bellcourt, a residential subdivision designed to attract people seeking suburban homes with convenient access to Manhattan by rail.

The development included landscaped streets and distinctive cobblestone pillars marking intersections along Bell Avenue. A cobblestone house at 35-34 Bell Boulevard, completed in 1906, is an example of the area's early residential architecture. The New York City Landmarks Preservation Commission designated the building a New York City landmark in 2004.

Bell Boulevard has been known for its concentration of bars and nightlife venues, attracting patrons from across Queens and neighboring areas. During the 1980s and early 1990s, the street developed a reputation as a major nightlife destination, although concerns about noise, disorder, and violence also drew attention. In June 1992, a fatal shooting involving a bouncer at a local nightclub contributed to the closure of several establishments and a decline in the boulevard's nightlife scene. In subsequent years, the area experienced a revival, with bars and restaurants continuing to attract visitors.

== Transportation ==
Bell Boulevard is served by the Long Island Rail Road's Port Washington Branch at Bayside station. In addition, multiple bus lines also operate along portions of the boulevard:

- The Q13 operates along Bell Boulevard between Northern Boulevard and 212th Street.
- The Q27 operates along Bell Boulevard between Bayside High School and 48th Avenue on designated school-tripper trips.
- The Q31 serves a section of Bell Boulevard between Bay Terrace Shopping Center and 48th Avenue.
