= Linden Boulevard =

Boulevard in Brooklyn, Queens, and Nassau County, New York

- Central Avenue
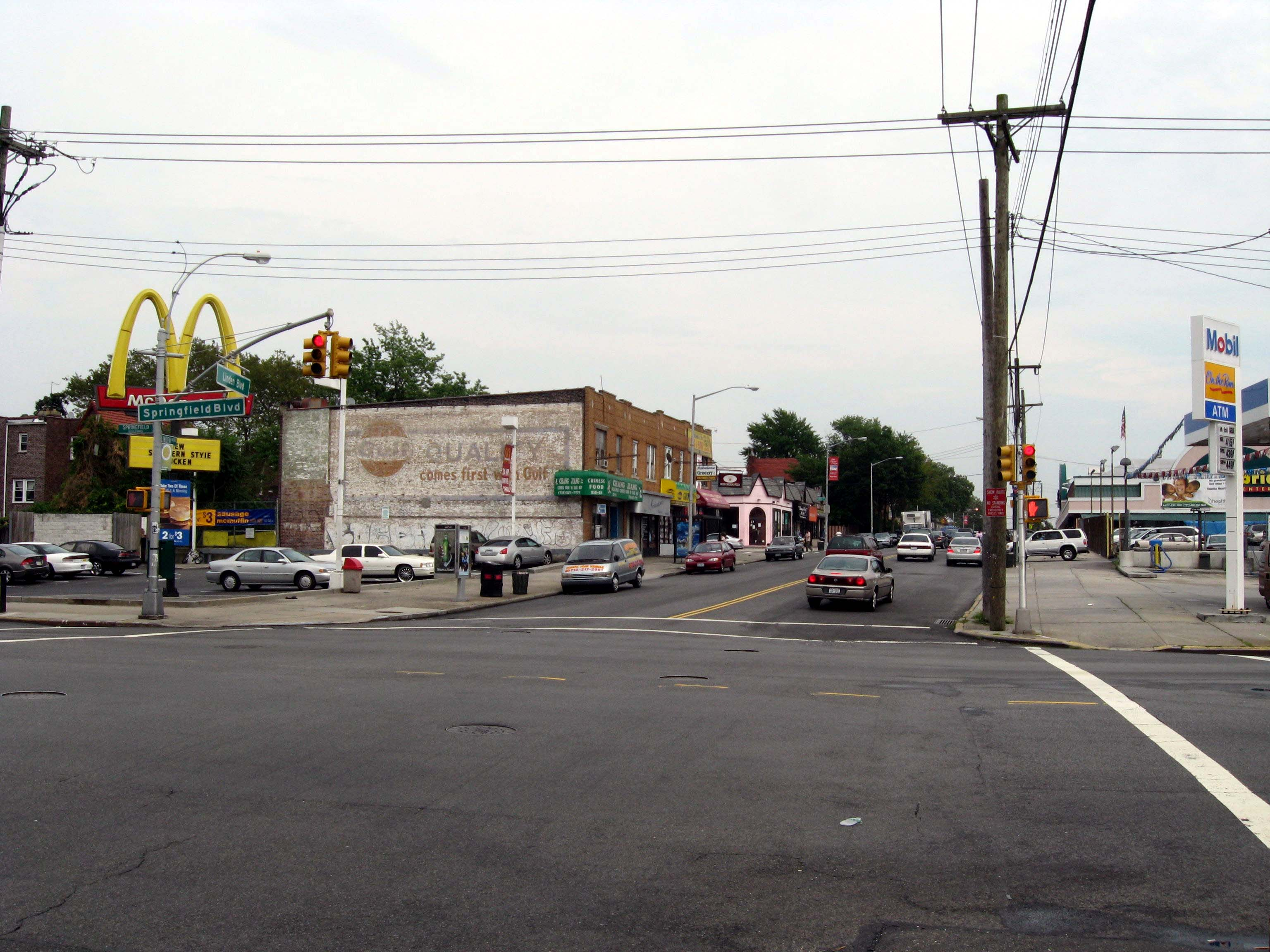
- Looking east at Springfield Boulevard in Cambria Heights
- Interactive map of Linden Boulevard
- Maintained by: NYCDOT and NCDPW
- Length: 12.7 mi (20.4 km); Combined length of three segments
- Component highways: NY 27 from Flatbush to Ozone Park
- Location: Brooklyn, Queens, Nassau County
- West end: Flatbush Avenue in Flatbush
- Major junctions: NY 27 in Ozone Park; I-678 in South Ozone Park; Cross Island Parkway in Cambria Heights; Southern State Parkway in North Valley Stream
- East end: NY 27 in Valley Stream

Linden Boulevard is a boulevard in New York City and Nassau County. Its western end is at Flatbush Avenue in Brooklyn, where Linden Boulevard travels as an eastbound-only street to Caton Avenue, where it becomes a two-way street. The boulevard stretches through both Brooklyn and Queens – in addition to southwestern Nassau County. This boulevard, especially the area of Cambria Heights between Springfield Boulevard and the Nassau County line represents a smaller version of shopping centers located on Jamaica Avenue and Queens Boulevard.

Within Nassau County, the road becomes the unsigned Nassau County Route C36. It is known as Linden Boulevard as far east as Valley Stream and then becomes Central Avenue, which was one of several former names of the street in Queens.

== Description ==
=== New York City section ===
Linden Boulevard runs through both Brooklyn and Queens, but is interrupted by Aqueduct Racetrack and the street grid in Ozone Park, Queens. The street's character is very different in each borough. Linden Boulevard in Brooklyn, between Flatbush Avenue and Sapphire Street, is 6 miles (9.7 km) long. The five Queens stretches are a combined 6.4 miles (10.3 km) long.

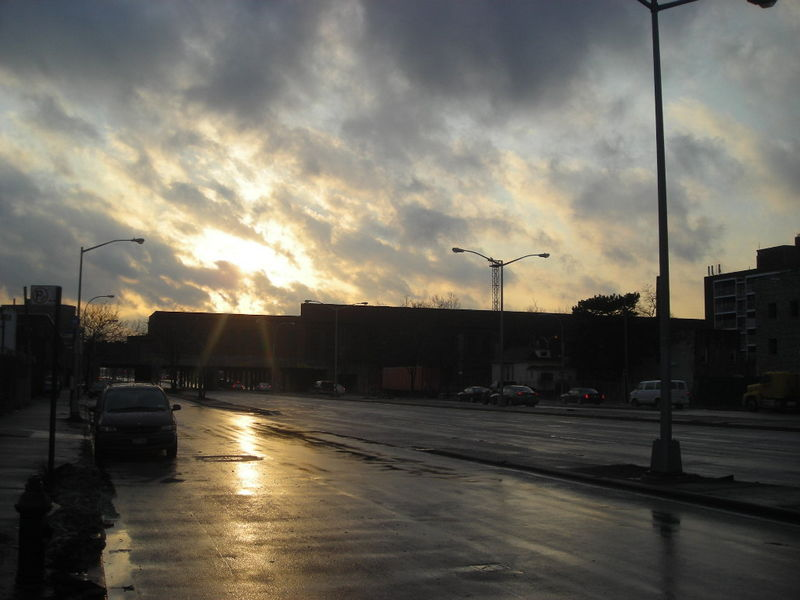
Linden Boulevard in East New York

In Brooklyn, between the intersection with Kings Highway and Remsen Avenue, and the intersection with 79th Street and South Conduit Avenue one block east of the Brooklyn–Queens border, it is one of the widest boulevards in the entire city, being a multi-median divided, 8-lane wide boulevard, similar to Queens' Woodhaven Boulevard and Queens Boulevard. While the speed limit on the rest of Linden Boulevard was set at 25 miles per hour in 2015, in line with the city speed limit, this section of Linden Boulevard was lowered over time. The speed limit was lowered to 30 MPH as part of the city's Vision Zero program in 2015, and was subsequently further lowered to 25 MPH in 2019. Still, in 2026 the city's Department of Transportation classified it Vision Zero Priority Corridor, with the highest number of recorded traffic deaths and injuries in the borough. It is also one of Brooklyn's busiest streets, carrying many trucks, as it is the only direct route for commercial vehicles between Long Island and the Verrazzano–Narrows Bridge since commercial traffic is banned from the Belt Parkway, which runs between the same points. With the street's current design, writes an AMNY writer, drivers "frequently speed, forc[ing] pedestrians to cross several lanes of traffic to get from one side to another and often leaves buses stuck behind double-parked cars." The stretch of Linden Boulevard from Caton Avenue to Conduit Avenue is part of New York State Route 27.

In Queens, it is mostly a simple two-lane, two-way residential street, no wider than the numbered avenues it parallels, and hardly busier until it reaches Cambria Heights, where it serves as a main commercial strip. Between Aqueduct Racetrack and Cross Bay Boulevard, there is a seven-block section of the boulevard that is mostly residential but is the only road between Rockaway Boulevard and Conduit Avenue on which traffic can flow east of the elevated railroad. One block west of Cross Bay Boulevard, contained within one block, are two short sections (each less than half a block), that are dead ends. One is off Desarc Road, and the other is located at the intersection of Sitka Street and Pitkin Avenue.

Conduit Avenue in Queens interrupts Linden Boulevard. The majority of its traffic merges into the Nassau Expressway, which starts just east of the Linden Boulevard/Conduit Avenue intersection. Linden Boulevard becomes a dead-end street at Pitkin Avenue; another dead-end stretch of the boulevard is at Desarc Road, one block east of Pitkin Avenue. Linden Boulevard then resumes at Cross Bay Boulevard one block east of the dead-end stretches, is interrupted by Aqueduct Racetrack, resumes at Rockaway Boulevard in South Ozone Park, and continues into Nassau County from there.

=== Nassau County section ===
County Route C36
- Location: Valley Stream–North Valley Stream
- Length: 2.48 mi (3.99 km)

Upon entering Nassau County, Linden Boulevard assumes the Nassau County Route C36 designation, and runs 2.48 miles (3.99 km) between Valley Stream and North Valley Stream.

==== Route description ====
CR C36 begins as Central Avenue at Sunrise Highway (NY 27) in Valley Stream. From there, it travels north-northwest, soon intersecting Merrick Road (CR 27). It then continues north-northwest, intersecting Remson Avenue, thence meanders its way north-northwest to the Valley Stream–North Valley Stream border, at which point it enters the latter community. It then continues northwest, passing Margaret Drive and thence Fernwood Drive, at which point CR C36 curves towards the north-northwest and then crosses underneath the Southern State Parkway at Exit 13 N-S. At this point Central Avenue veers towards the west-northwest, becoming Linden Boulevard. CR C36 then continues west-northwest along Linden Boulevard, soon intersecting Elmont Road (CR C71). It then continues west-northwest to the Queens–Nassau County border, where the CR C36 designation ends; Linden Boulevard continues west of this location through Queens and thence Brooklyn. CR C36 was formerly designated as part of CR 20, prior to the route numbers in Nassau County being altered.

== Transportation ==
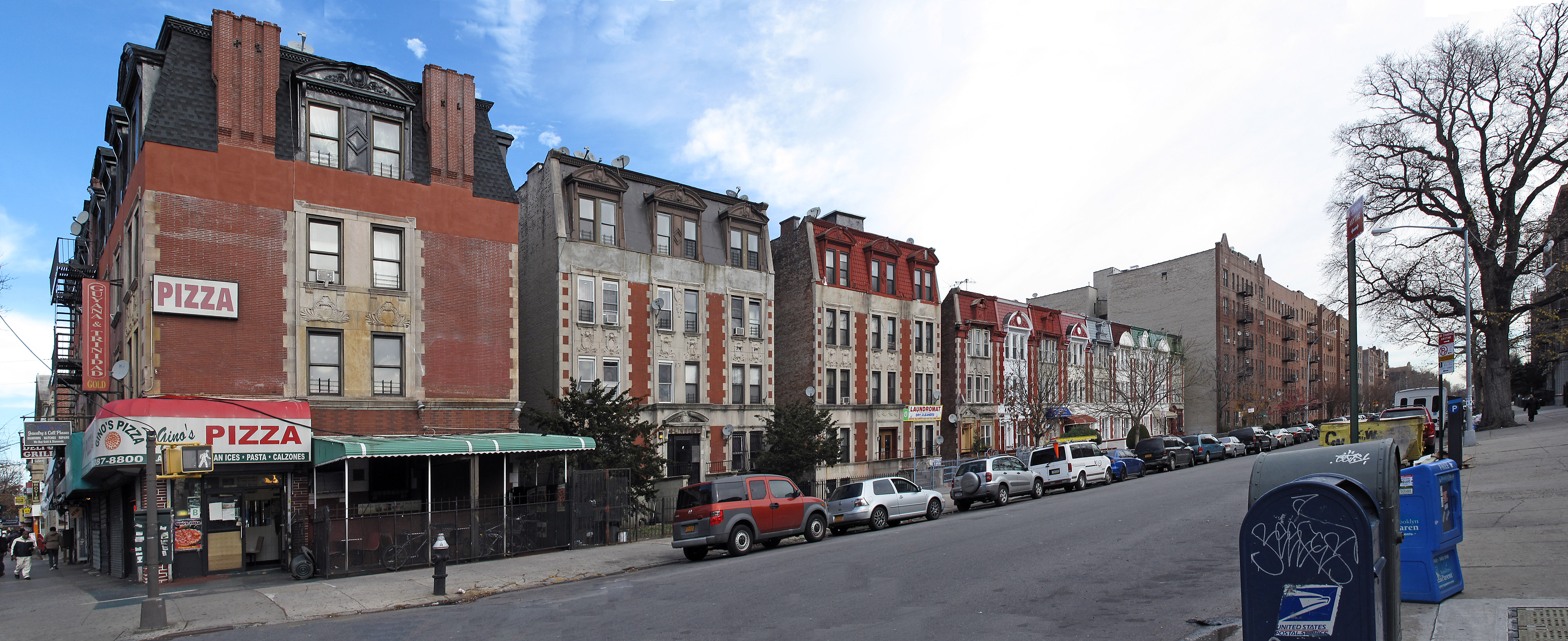
Linden Boulevard at Flatbush Avenue

Linden Boulevard is served by the following bus routes:

- West from Eldert Lane in East New York, the B13 goes to Euclid Avenue, the B20 goes to Ashford Street, and Crown Heights-bound B14 buses go to Lincoln Avenue.
- The Gateway Mall-bound Q8 runs from Euclid Avenue to Fountain Avenue.
- Bay Ridge-bound B8 buses run from Rockaway Avenue to Church Avenue.
- West from the Linden Boulevard entrance/exit at Conduit Avenue, the B15 goes to Fountain Avenue, while the BM5 express goes to Ashford Street.
- West from 235th Street at the Nassau border, the Q4 goes to Merrick Boulevard, while the QM64 goes to Farmers Boulevard.
- After Merrick, the QM63 takes over, followed by the QM21 and QM65 at Guy R. Brewer Boulevard. All three routes head to Van Wyck Expressway North.
- Until 2010, the Q89 also served a small stretch of Linden Boulevard in Richmond Hill. As of 2025, it is now taken over by the Q51, supplementing Q4 service west of Francis Lewis Boulevard and providing new service towards Rockaway Boulevard.

== History ==
The earliest section of road to be called Linden Boulevard was opened between Kings Highway and Flatbush Avenue as a street grid expanded through the town of Flatbush. In the 1920s, a network of highways was proposed through what had since become the borough of Brooklyn to connect to Conduit Boulevard, including an extension of Linden Boulevard to the Conduit Boulevard, allowing for a continuous highway across Brooklyn via Caton Avenue and the Fort Hamilton Parkway. This project was approved in 1924, but construction didn't start until 1931. In the meantime, a second extension was proposed in 1929 to connect to the Southern State Parkway, allowing for an outlet for the highway, which, at the time, ended at the Queens County line. Work on the section west of Conduit Boulevard opened the road in March 1932, with completion carried out later that year. The section east of there absorbed part of Central Avenue in Queens, and was constructed in 1934. Two years later, the section between Conduit Boulevard and Rockaway Boulevard was still being debated, but the section was never fully constructed. In 2026, the city government proposed rebuilding Linden Boulevard from Fountain Avenue to Conduit Boulevard with bus lanes and added pedestrian areas.

== In popular culture ==
Rappers Q-Tip and Phife Dawg, the founding members of the hip-hop group A Tribe Called Quest, both grew up on Linden Boulevard in the neighborhood of St. Albans, Queens in the 1970s and 80s. They later referred to Linden Boulevard in their songs "Check the Rhime" and "Jazz (We've Got)" (from the album The Low End Theory), "Steve Biko (Stir It Up)" (from Midnight Marauders) and "1nce Again", "Mind Power" and "Get A Hold" (from Beats, Rhymes and Life). The music video for "Check the Rhime" was mostly filmed on Linden Boulevard, and showed Q-Tip and Phife Dawg rapping above a crowd on the rooftop of a dry-cleaning store on Linden and 192nd Street. In July 2016, several months after Phife Dawg's death, a mural honoring A Tribe Called Quest was put up on the side of that dry cleaning store. In November 2016, the section of Linden Boulevard at the corner of 192nd St. was honorarily renamed to Malik 'Phife Dawg' Taylor Way.

The 1998 film Belly features Linden Boulevard.

== Major intersections ==
County	Location	mi	km	Destinations	Notes
Brooklyn	Flatbush	0.0	0.0	Flatbush Avenue	
Brooklyn	Flatbush	0.2	0.32	NY 27 west (Caton Avenue) / Bedford Avenue	NY 27 leaves/joins Linden Boulevard
Brooklyn	East Flatbush	0.5	0.80	Nostrand Avenue	
Brooklyn	East Flatbush	1.9	3.1	Kings Highway	No eastbound left turns; western terminus of service roads
Brooklyn	Brownsville	2.5	4.0	Rockaway Parkway	
Brooklyn	East New York	3.7	6.0	Pennsylvania Avenue	
Queens	Ozone Park	6.0	9.7	NY 27 east (Conduit Avenue)	Partial interchange; NY 27 continues east
Queens	Ozone Park	Gap in route, including a 0.4-mile (0.6 km) long segment with no major intersections			
Queens	South Ozone Park	0.0	0.0	Rockaway Boulevard	Former NY 27A
Queens	South Ozone Park	1.1	1.8	I-678 (Van Wyck Expressway) – Kennedy Airport, Whitestone Bridge, Bronx	Exit 3 on I-678; access via service roads
Queens	South Jamaica	2.6	4.2	Merrick Boulevard	
Queens	Cambria Heights	4.4	7.1	Francis Lewis Boulevard	
Queens	Cambria Heights	4.5	7.2	Springfield Boulevard	
Queens	Cambria Heights	5.5	8.9	Belt Parkway west / Cross Island Parkway north – Kennedy Airport, Whitestone Bridge, Bronx	Exit 25B on Belt / Cross Island Parkways; access via service roads
Queens–Nassau county line	Cambria Heights– North Valley Stream line	5.6 2.48	9.0 3.99	Western terminus of unsigned CR C36	
Nassau	North Valley Stream	2.21	3.56	Elmont Road (CR C71) to Southern State Parkway east	
Nassau	North Valley Stream	1.75	2.82	Central Avenue (CR C36) / Southern State Parkway east – East Islip	Exit 13 on Southern Parkway; CR C36 continues south
Nassau	Valley Stream	0.00	0.00	NY 27 (Sunrise Highway)	At-grade intersection
1.000 mi = 1.609 km; 1.000 km = 0.621 mi: Incomplete access; Route transition
