= North Valley Stream, New York =

- Hamlet and Census-designated place
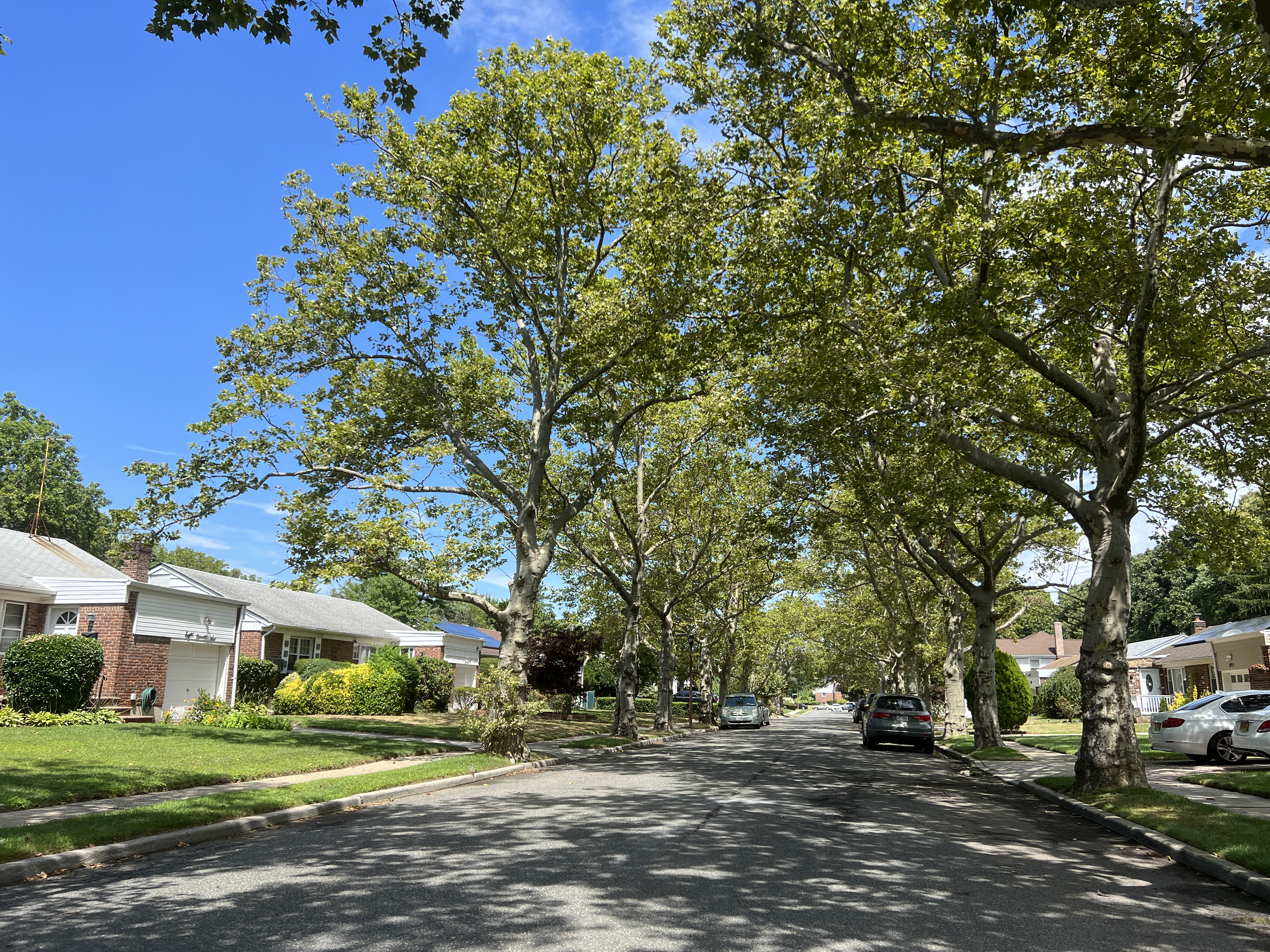
- Niagara Street in North Valley Stream on August 8, 2022.

- Location in Nassau County and the state of New York

- Location on Long Island Location within the state of New York
- Coordinates: 40°40′59″N 73°42′34″W
- Country: United States
- State: New York
- County: Nassau
- Town: Hempstead
- Named after: Its location north of Valley Stream

Area
  - Total: 1.90 sq mi (4.91 km^{2})
  - Land: 1.86 sq mi (4.83 km^{2})
  - Water: 0.031 sq mi (0.08 km^{2})
- Elevation: 36 ft (11 m)

Population (2020)
  - Total: 18,197
  - Density: 9,758.4/sq mi (3,767.72/km^{2})
- Time zone: UTC-5 (Eastern (EST))
  - Summer (DST): UTC-4 (EDT)
- ZIP Codes: 11580, 11581 (Valley Stream)
- Area codes: 516, 363
- FIPS code: 36-53748
- GNIS feature ID: 0958936

North Valley Stream is a hamlet and census-designated place (CDP) in the Town of Hempstead in Nassau County, on Long Island, in New York, United States. The population was 18,197 at the time of the 2020 census.

== History ==
North Valley Stream's name reflects its location north of the Incorporated Village of Valley Stream.

In the 1950s, the Southern State Parkway was widened from four lanes to six through the hamlet. The project required roughly 213 North Valley Stream area homes located along the path to be moved or demolished.

== Geography ==
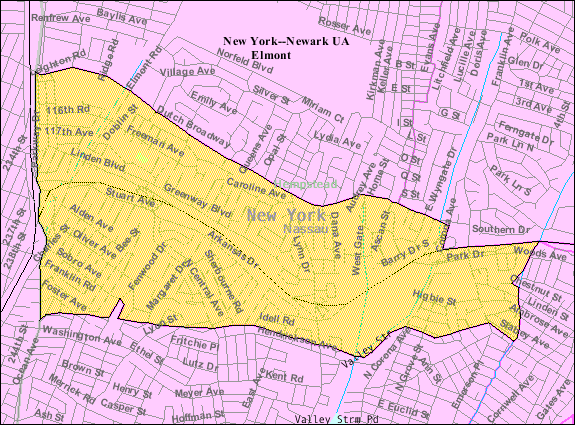
U.S. Census map of North Valley Stream.

According to the United States Census Bureau, the CDP has a total area of 1.9 square miles (4.9 km^{2}), all land.

== Demographics ==
Historical population
Census	Pop.	Note	%±
2020	18,197		—
U.S. Decennial Census

=== 2020 census ===
As of the 2020 census, North Valley Stream had a population of 18,197. The median age was 42.5 years. 18.6% of residents were under the age of 18 and 18.9% of residents were 65 years of age or older. For every 100 females there were 87.7 males, and for every 100 females age 18 and over there were 84.8 males age 18 and over.

100.0% of residents lived in urban areas, while 0.0% lived in rural areas.

There were 5,447 households in North Valley Stream, of which 32.9% had children under the age of 18 living in them. Of all households, 51.9% were married-couple households, 13.1% were households with a male householder and no spouse or partner present, and 31.6% were households with a female householder and no spouse or partner present. About 20.1% of all households were made up of individuals and 10.6% had someone living alone who was 65 years of age or older.

There were 5,638 housing units, of which 3.4% were vacant. The homeowner vacancy rate was 1.3% and the rental vacancy rate was 4.3%.

Racial composition as of the 2020 census
Race	Number	Percent
White	2,891	15.9%
Black or African American	8,304	45.6%
American Indian and Alaska Native	125	0.7%
Asian	3,529	19.4%
Native Hawaiian and Other Pacific Islander	6	0.0%
Some other race	1,635	9.0%
Two or more races	1,707	9.4%
Hispanic or Latino (of any race)	2,677	14.7%

=== 2000 census ===
As of the 2000 census, there were 15,789 people, 4,860 households, and 3,946 families residing in the CDP. The population density was 8,382.9 inhabitants per square mile (3,236.7/km^{2}). There were 4,951 housing units at an average density of 2,628.7 per square mile (1,014.9/km^{2}). The racial makeup of the CDP was 44.73% White, 37.08% African American, 0.27% Native American, 9.03% Asian, 0.06% Pacific Islander, 4.69% from other races, and 4.14% from two or more races. Hispanic or Latino of any race were 10.82% of the population.

There were 4,860 households, out of which 39.6% had children under the age of 18 living with them, 61.9% were married couples living together, 14.9% had a female householder with no husband present, and 18.8% were non-families. 16.1% of all households were made up of individuals, and 8.5% had someone living alone who was 65 years of age or older. The average household size was 3.21 and the average family size was 3.57.

In the CDP, the population was spread out, with 26.0% under the age of 18, 8.3% from 18 to 24, 28.6% from 25 to 44, 23.0% from 45 to 64, and 14.0% who were 65 years of age or older. The median age was 37 years. For every 100 females, there were 86.7 males. For every 100 females age 18 and over, there were 84.2 males.

The median income for a household in the CDP was $82,100, and the median income for a family was $88,914. Males had a median income of $83,450 versus $57,015 for females. The per capita income for the CDP was $24,727. About 3.0% of families and 3.7% of the population were below the poverty line, including 2.7% of those under age 18 and 6.5% of those age 65 or over.

== Parks and recreation ==
Valley Stream State Park is primarily located within the hamlet, while a small portion extends south into the Village of Valley Stream.

== Education ==
=== Elementary ===
North Valley Stream is located within the boundaries of (and is thus served by) three elementary school districts: the Valley Stream 13, Elmont, and Valley Stream 30 Union Free School Districts.

As such, children who reside within North Valley Stream and attend public elementary schools go the school in one of these three districts depending on where they reside within the hamlet.

=== Secondary ===
North Valley Stream is located within the boundaries of (and is thus served by) the Valley Stream Central High School District and the Sewanhaka Central High School District, in different parts.

As such, children who reside within North Valley Stream and attend public high schools either attend the Valley Stream CHSD's high schools or the Sewanhaka CHSD's high schools, depending on where they reside within the hamlet.

Additionally, the Elmont UFSD feeds into the Sewanhaka CHSD, while the Valley Stream 13 UFSD and Valley Stream 30 UFSD both feed into the Valley Stream CHSD.

== Transportation ==
=== Road ===
The Southern State Parkway travels through and serves North Valley Stream. The Southern State Parkway meanders its way west-to-east within the hamlet, roughly bisecting the hamlet in half.

Other major roads in North Valley Stream include Central Avenue, Corona Avenue, Dutch Broadway, Fletcher Avenue, and Linden Boulevard.

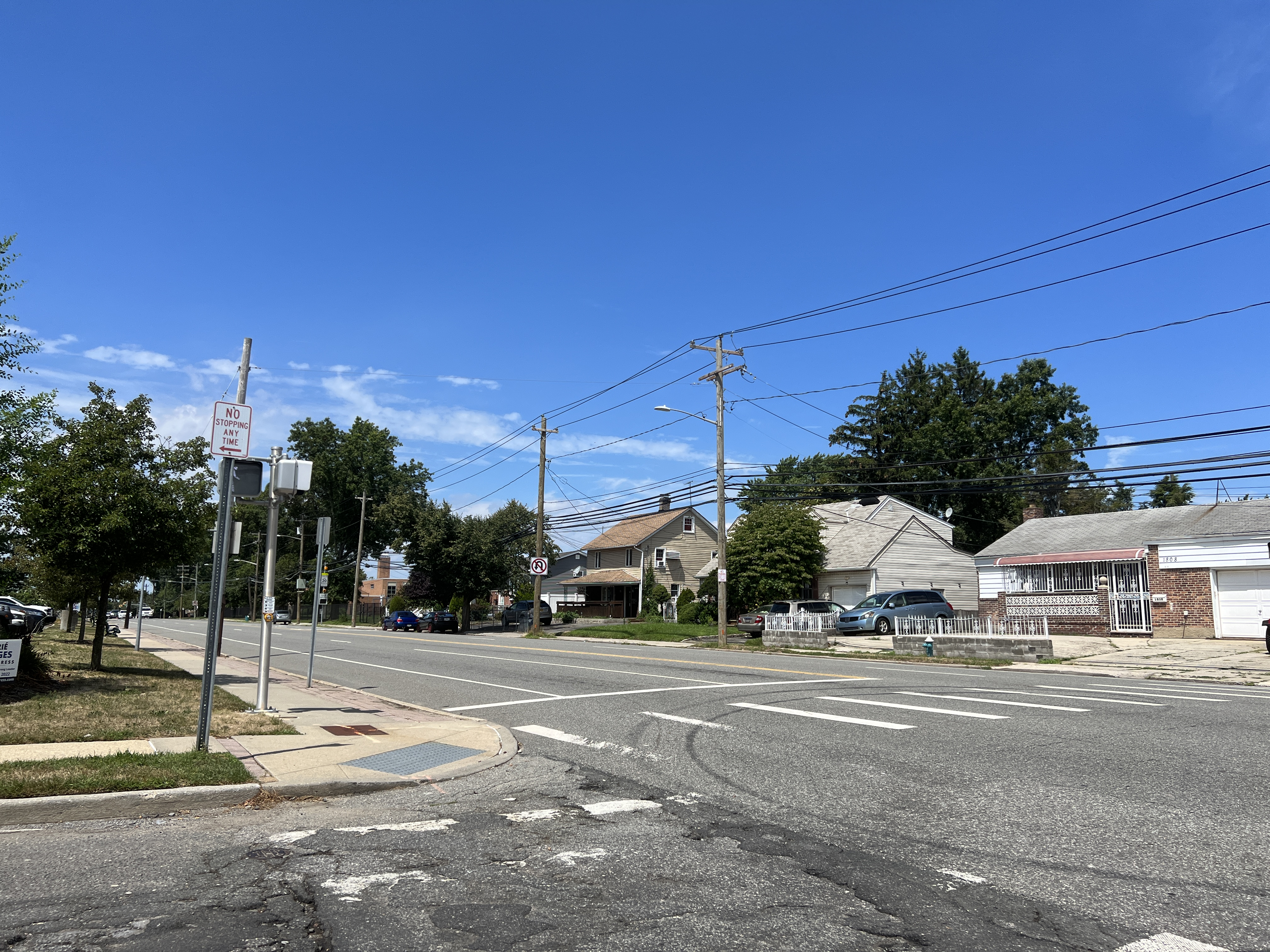
Dutch Broadway within the hamlet on August 11, 2022.

=== Rail ===
No rail lines pass through North Valley Stream. The nearest Long Island Rail Road stations to the hamlet are Valley Stream on the Atlantic Branch, and Westwood & Malverne on the West Hempstead Branch.

=== Bus ===
The hamlet is served by the n1 and n25 bus routes – both of which are operated by Nassau Inter-County Express (NICE).

== See also ==
- Valley Stream, New York
- South Valley Stream, New York
