= Little Neck Bay =

Embayment on Long Island, New York

Coordinates: 40.793°N 73.763°W

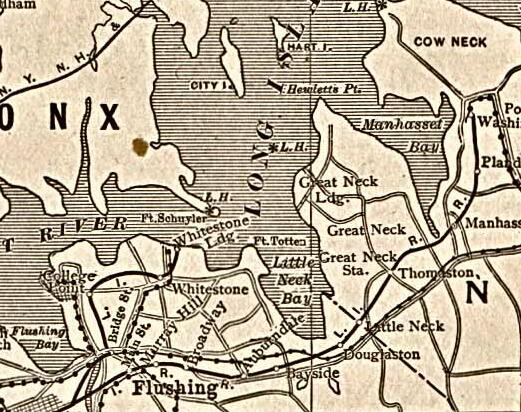
Little Neck Bay c. 1917

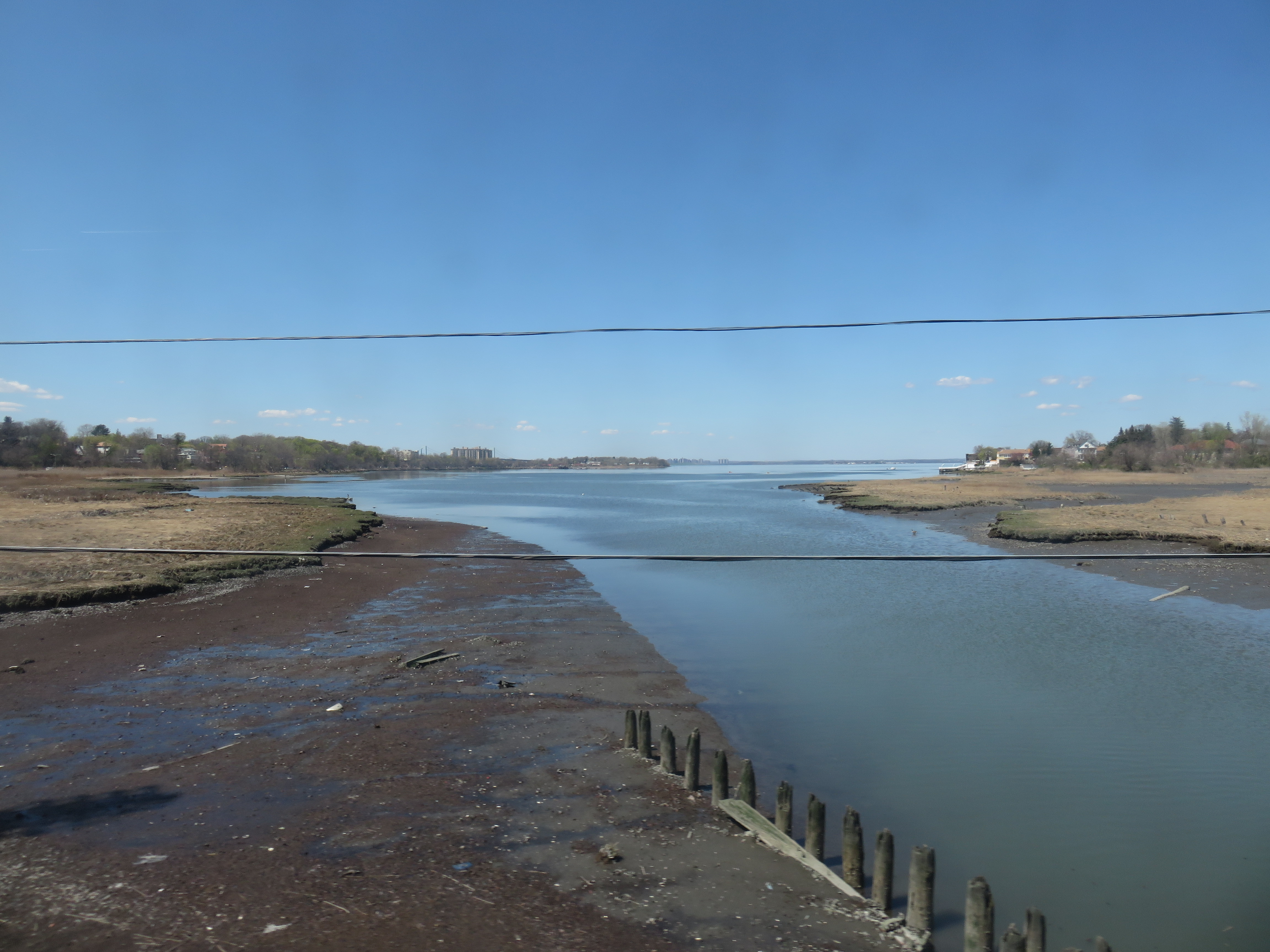
The southern end of Little Neck Bay

Little Neck Bay is an embayment in western Long Island, New York, off Long Island Sound. Little Neck Bay forms the western boundary of the Great Neck Peninsula, the eastern boundary of which is Manhasset Bay. The political boundary between Nassau County and the borough of Queens runs through the bay, bordering the neighborhood of Douglaston–Little Neck.

== Description ==
At the entrance to the bay, on the western point – known as Willets Point – is Fort Totten, which was built to protect the entrance to the tidal strait known as the East River. At the eastern side of the entrance is Elm Point (the end of Steamboat Road in Kings Point). The bay is about a mile wide at the entrance and extends back just under two miles. Originally, on the western and southern sides of the bay there were extensive salt marshes. Saddle Rock is located on the eastern side of the bay about half-way in. The bay is shallower than Manhasset Bay, being only 12 feet (3.7 m) deep at the entrance, with most of the back bay being less than 6 feet (1.8 m) deep. Alley Pond Park and Cross Island Parkway are on the southern and southwestern shore, and Alley Creek drains into the bay.

Traditionally, the Algonquin who lived around Little Neck Bay when Europeans came were considered to be from a tribe known as the Matinecock. However, that view has been challenged. Later, from the 1860s through the 1890s, small hard clams (quahogs) from Little Neck Bay were served in the best restaurants of New York and several European capitals. Eventually, the term "littleneck" or "littleneck clam" came to be used as a size category for all hard clams, regardless of origin. Saddle-rock oysters are also found in the bay. The bay was closed to harvesting in 1909 due to pollution.

== See also ==
- Hempstead Harbor
- Manhasset Bay
