= Q79 (New York City bus) =

Former bus route in Queens, New York

q79
- Little Neck Parkway

Overview
- System: MTA Regional Bus Operations
- Operator: New York City Transit
- Garage: Queens Village Depot
- Began service: June 4, 1950
- Ended service: June 27, 2010

Route
- Locale: Queens, New York, U.S.
- Communities served: Little Neck, Glen Oaks, Bellerose, Floral Park
- Landmarks served: Queens County Farm Museum
- Start: Little Neck – Little Neck station / LIRR 40th Avenue & Little Neck Parkway
- Via: Little Neck Parkway
- End: Floral Park – Jamaica Avenue & 257th Street
- Timetable: Q79

The Q79 bus route constituted a public transit line in Queens, New York City. It ran primarily along Little Neck Parkway between Little Neck station and Jamaica Avenue. Service on the route, initially known as the Q12A, began on June 4, 1950, following a request made by Queens Borough President Maurice A. FitzGerald. In 1990, the route was renumbered the Q79. In 1996, the Metropolitan Transportation Authority proposed extending the route to Floral Park, but this extension was canceled to community opposition. This route was operated by the New York City Transit brand until June 27, 2010, when it was discontinued under system-wide service cuts.

== Route description and service ==
The Q79 began at the intersection of 40th Avenue and Little Neck Parkway near the Little Neck station on the Long Island Rail Road's (LIRR) Port Washington Branch. From there, buses continued south along Little Neck Parkway through the communities of Little Neck, Glen Oaks, and Bellerose, before turning onto Jamaica Avenue/Jericho Turnpike in Floral Park and terminating at 257th Street. Buses returning to Little Neck then turned north on 257th Street, west on 87th Avenue, and south on 256th Street before turning onto Jamaica Avenue/Jericho Turnpike. Buses then headed north on Little Neck Parkway before heading west on 41st Avenue, north on 249th Street, and east on 40th Avenue to reach the terminal. This was one of the few bus routes in the city not to connect to a subway line. This bus route was operated out of Queens Village Depot. The route had low ridership because it passed through largely suburban and low density areas; 90% of the households in the area had at least one automobile. In addition, the only traffic generators on the route were Deepdale Hospital, the United Cerebral Palsy Center and the Little Neck LIRR station.

== History ==
=== Early history ===
Queens Borough President Maurice A. FitzGerald suggested the creation of the Little Neck to Bellerose bus route to the New York City Board of Estimate running along Little Neck Parkway. On March 7, 1950, the New York City Board of Transportation passed a resolution adopting route Q12A, which would run along the corridor. On March 9, the Board announced that a public hearing concerning the route would be held on April 4. At the public hearing, Little Neck residents argued for a change in the route's northern terminal loop, which was granted by the Board. This required the Board to hold an additional public hearing on April 27. Originally, the route would have turned off of Little Neck Parkway onto Northern Boulevard before running along Westmoreland Street to 39th Avenue at the LIRR station. The changed route had buses stay on Little Neck Parkway until Marathon Parkway, before turning on 40th Avenue, which was one block to the south of the LIRR station, and going back on Little Neck Parkway.

On April 27, the Board of Estimate approved the proposed service over the objections of civic leaders and property owners from Little Neck, who feared that the bus route would create a bottleneck, and called for the route to end at Northern Boulevard. The new route was expected to provide better transit access to employees of the Hazeltine Electronics Corporation, whose facility was at the intersection of Grand Central Parkway and Little Neck Parkway. The route was approved by the Mayor on June 2. Q12A service started on June 4, 1950, against the wishes of many Little Neck homeowners who did not want buses to run through their streets. On the first day of operation bus service could not run on its intended route at both terminals. At the Little Neck end there was a detour due to water-main work, and at the Floral Park end, local residents complained about its route along 254th Street, forcing it to change route for that day.

=== Service cuts and discontinuation ===
On April 15, 1990, several Queens bus routes with suffixes were relabeled including the Q12A, which was renamed the Q79 to distinguish itself from the Q12 route along Northern Boulevard. In December 1990, the Metropolitan Transportation Authority (MTA) announced that, because it had a $272 million deficit for 1991, it proposed reducing the hours of 127 token booths, shortening 19 or 20 local bus routes, and discontinuing 7 express bus routes and 24 to 27 local bus routes, including the Q79 service, which had low ridership. The Q79 was only used by 60 riders per day, fewer than the 300 per day needed to maintain the service. However, due to significant public outcry, the MTA Board opted for a fare increase instead of the cuts. In March 1991, the MTA stated that it might extend the route to the Floral Park LIRR station instead of discontinuing it, with the MTA Board to decide on the proposition in April. A spokesperson for the MTA stated that even if the route was saved, there might not be Saturday service, which could be kept or reinstated after the extension. The MTA had tried to extend the route to Floral Park in 1987, but the extension was canceled due to opposition from the village of Floral Park.

On February 24, 1995, the MTA Board voted to drastically cut bus and subway service for the first time in two decades in order to cut $113 million out of the $3 billion budget of New York City Transit Authority (NYCTA). The budget cuts were pushed by Governor George Pataki, who approved the service reductions as part of a package of budget cuts to avoid a fare increase. The NYCTA expected a $160 million surplus, but was left with a projected deficit of $172 million after MTA funding was reduced on the local, state, and federal levels. As part of the cuts, the Q79 was set to be discontinued along with the Bx18 and Bx24 because of its poor performance (it had a 25% cost recovery ratio, the fifth lowest of the local bus system) and the low transit dependency of the riders of the adjacent communities. The route's proposed discontinuation was deferred by the MTA Board pending the creation of a plan to improve ridership and revenue due to objection by the local community and elected officials.

The chairman of the MTA, Peter Stangl, approved a plan to save the route by extending it 1/3 mile (0.54 km) southwards to the Floral Park station on the LIRR's Hempstead Branch in Nassau County. The plan, announced on March 28, 1996, was intended to increase ridership by 100 to 125 a day, and would have begun service at the end of June. The extension was intended to give LIRR commuters a new option, as the route would connect the Hempstead Branch on its southern end and the Port Washington Branch on its northern end. The route would have been extended south via Little Neck Parkway, Carnation Avenue and Caroline Place to the LIRR station. Service heading northbound would head north on Tulip Avenue before returning to Little Neck Parkway. A bus/rail reduced fare UniTicket would have been arranged for riders on the southern half of the Little Neck Parkway corridor. The extension would have also reduced traffic near the LIRR station as some riders being dropped of or driving to the station would use the bus instead. This proposed extension was strongly supported by elected officials from eastern Queens, but was stymied when the village of Floral Park informally rejected the plan that September, citing "tremendous parking problems" and narrow streets within the village, as well as the village's board of trustees' belief that an extension would not increase ridership. By the next month, the MTA planned to reevaluate the route in January 1996.

On April 18, 1996, the MTA dropped a discussion of extending the route from its agenda for that day's board meeting. The proposal to extend Q79 service to the Floral Park LIRR station in Nassau County was scrapped due to opposition from the village of Floral Park, whose board had already voted against the plan because they expected the bus route to increase traffic and worsen parking problems. The MTA stated that it would explore other ways to save the bus route. At a meeting with the Village Board, MTA staff noted that because of the Q79's low frequency, there would be no more than three buses per hour during the peak, and two per hour middays and Saturdays. At the May 1996 MTA Board meeting, due to Floral Park's opposition, New York City Transit announced plans to extend the Q79 only to Jericho Turnpike, with a terminal loop on 257th Street, 87th Road and 256th Street which was slightly closer to the Floral Park LIRR station. 10 to 15 additional riders on weekdays and 5 to 10 riders on Saturday were projected to be attracted to the route. The change was implemented in June 1996. The route's previous terminal had been at 87th Drive and Little Neck Parkway with a terminal loop running via 87th Road, 254th Street and 87th Drive.

On September 8, 2003, the span of weekday evening service was extended from 6:55 to 7:20 p.m. northbound, and from 7:30 to 7:50 p.m. southbound.

On December 17, 2009, the MTA board voted to cut New York City Transit bus and subway citywide in order to reduce the MTA's budget deficit of $900 million. As part of the cuts, Saturday Q79 service was to be discontinued. On January 22, 2010, the MTA announced that it modified its plan to cut transit service to reduce customer impact. As part of the change, all Q79 service was going to be discontinued. In 2009, the route had the lowest average weekday and weekend ridership for any New York City Transit local bus route in Queens (and the second-lowest overall), with an average of 650 weekday riders and 160 Saturday riders. On March 24, 2010, the MTA Board approved the revised cuts in service, and announced that the cuts would take effect in June. The route's planned discontinuation was opposed strongly by local officials and Amalgamated Transportation Union Local 1056. Cumulatively, the cuts for NYCT totaled $67.8 million; the Q79 was one of twenty local bus routes to be discontinued as part of the plan, with the last bus running on June 25, 2010. The route's discontinuation was expected to save New York City Transit $700,000 annually. The MTA evaluated the impacts of the changes in 2011, and assumed that a majority of Q79 riders started driving or using car services instead. After the bus route's discontinuation, the Taxi and Limousine Commission (TLC) issued a request-for-proposals for private operators to operate replacement service for the Q79 and two other discontinued routes. The TLC voted to approve the pilot program on July 15, 2010. An operator was chosen, and the TLC service was started, but due to low ridership, the pilot was discontinued shortly afterward.

=== Partial restoration ===
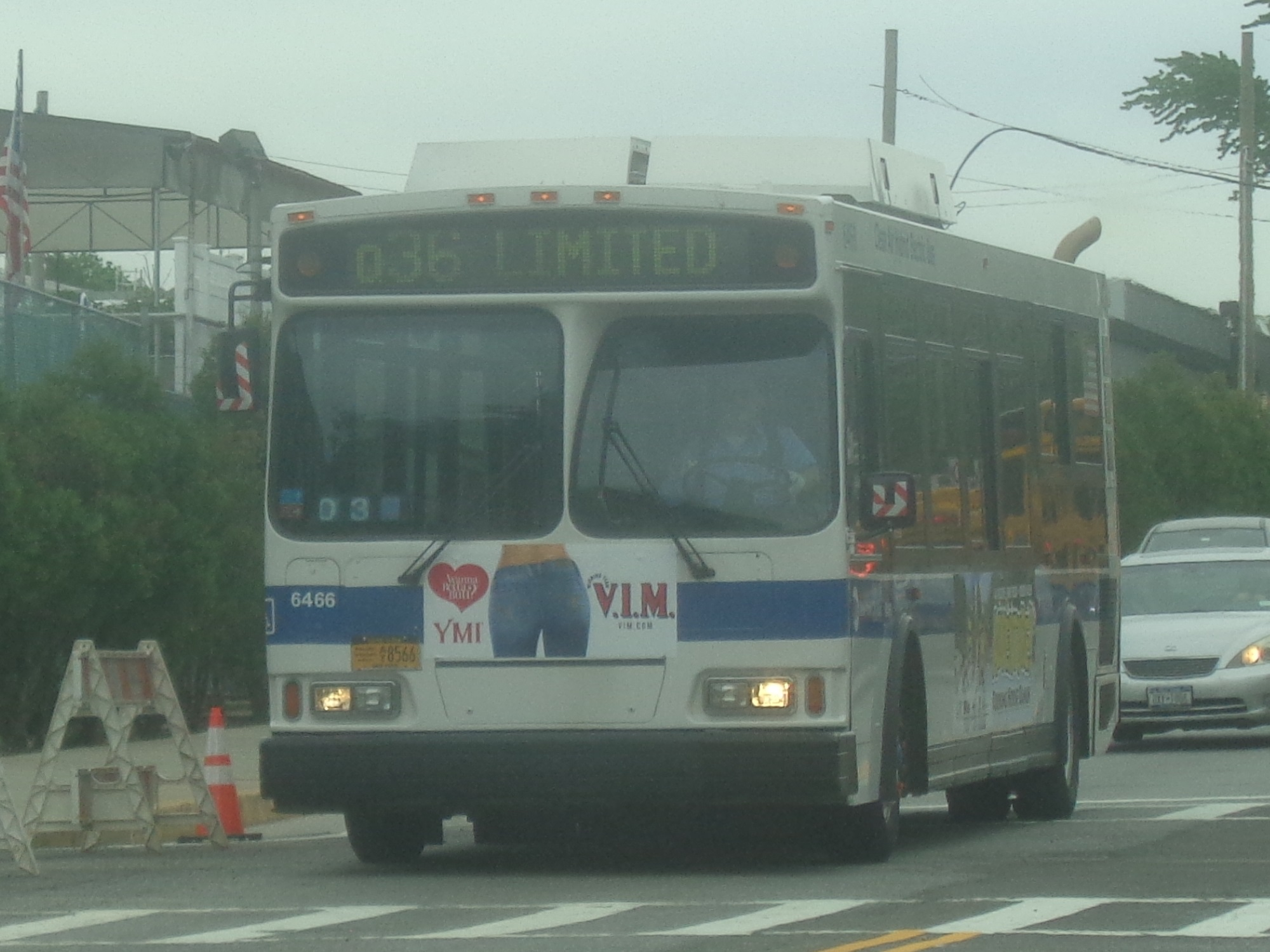
A 2004 Orion VII OG HEV (6466) on the Q36 operating on Little Neck Parkway, via the former Q79 route.

On January 7, 2013, weekday service along the Q79 route was restored with the extension of alternate Q36 trips from Jamaica Avenue to Little Neck along Little Neck Parkway. This extension also gave the Little Neck Parkway corridor a one-seat ride to the subway at the Jamaica–179th Street station, and the 169th Street station on Hillside Avenue. Q36 buses to the LIRR station in Little Neck were scheduled every 30 minutes, as opposed to connecting with every LIRR train due to the LIRR's erratic schedule, and to ensure reliability along the route. This change was made as part of the MTA's Service Enhancement Plan, which was released in July 2012, and was intended to restore network coverage. Starting in June 2025, all weekday and weekend Q36 buses run along Little Neck Parkway.

== See also ==
- Q74 (New York City bus, 1940–2010)
