= Q79 =

Topics referred to by the same term Maungchitoomaung

Q79 may refer to:

- Q79 (New York City bus)
- Al-Nazi'at, a surah of the Quran
- French submarine Volta
