= Union Turnpike local buses =

Bus routes in Queens, New York

q45 q46 rush, q48 rush
- Union Turnpike
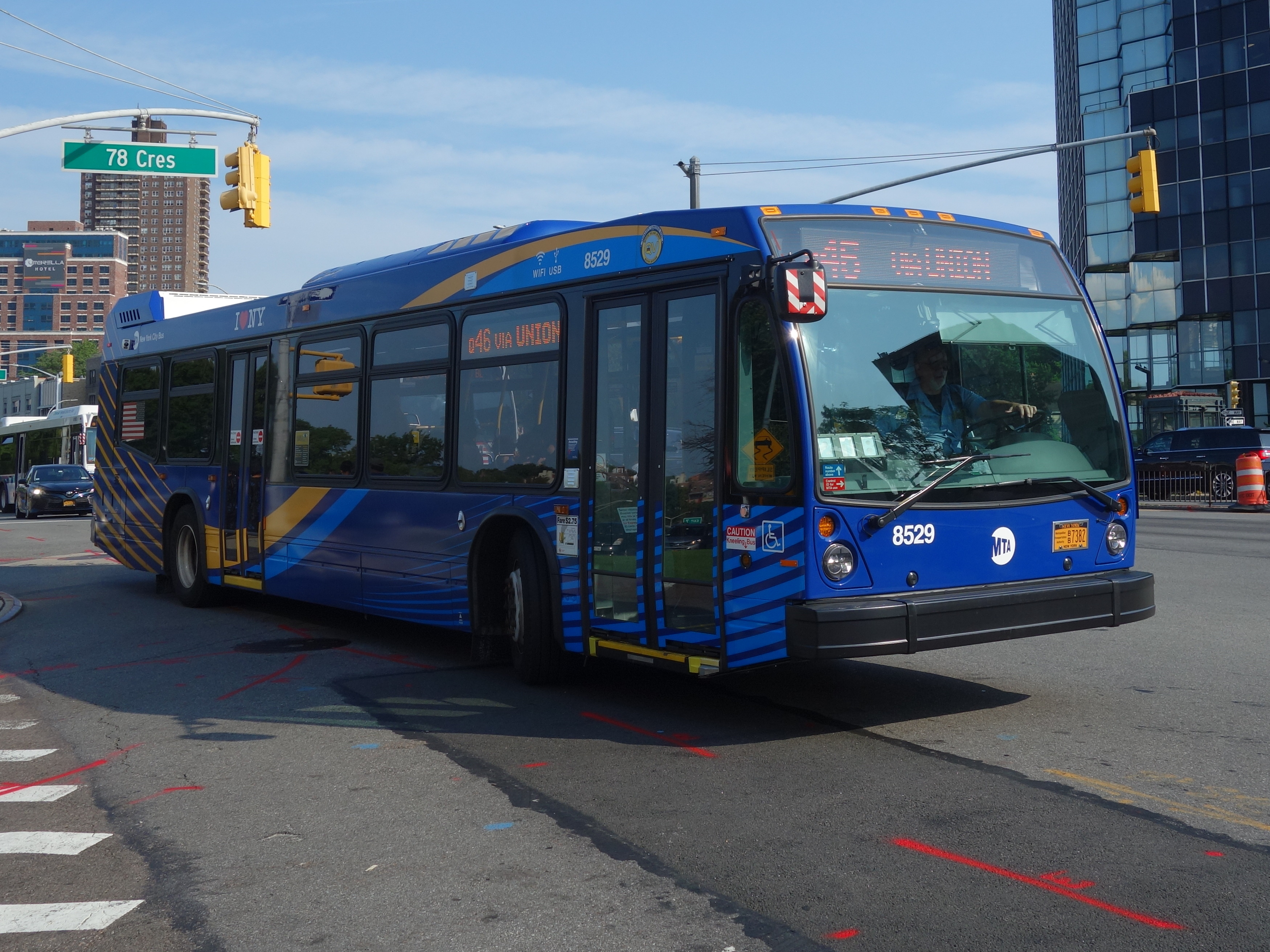
- A 2019 Nova Bus LFS (8529) on the Q46 in Kew Gardens in July 2019

Overview
- System: MTA Regional Bus Operations
- Operator: New York City Transit Authority
- Garage: Queens Village Depot
- Vehicle: Nova Bus LFS
- Began service: 1939; 1977 (Q44A limited-stop service)

Route
- Locale: Queens, New York, U.S.
- Communities served: Kew Gardens, Kew Gardens Hills, Hillcrest, Fresh Meadows, Hollis Hills, Oakland Gardens, Bellerose, Glen Oaks, Lake Success
- Landmarks served: Queens Borough Hall, St. John's University, Cunningham Park, Alley Pond Park, Creedmoor Psychiatric Center, Queens County Farm Museum, Long Island Jewish Medical Center
- Start: Kew Gardens – Queens Boulevard / Union Turnpike station
- Via: Union Turnpike
- End: Fresh Meadows – 188th Street & 64th Avenue (Q45); Lake Success, Nassau County – Long Island Jewish Medical Center (Q46); Glen Oaks – Little Neck Parkway & 260th Street (Q48)
- Length: 3.7 miles (6.0 km) (Q45); 8.1 miles (13.0 km) (Q46); 8.3 miles (13.4 km) (Q48)

Service
- Operates: 24 hours (Q45, Q46); Weekdays (Q48)
- Annual patronage: 677,632 (Q45, 2025); 3,176,455 (Q46, 2025); 802,563 (Q48, 2025): Q48 data from 2025 is inaccurate as it combines data from both the current Q48 and the former Q48 in northern Queens (discontinued June 2025).
- Transfers: Yes
- Timetable: Q45 Q46/Q48

The Q45, Q46, and Q48 bus routes constitute a public transit line in Queens, New York City, running primarily along Union Turnpike. Their western terminus is a major transfer with the New York City Subway's IND Queens Boulevard Line at the Kew Gardens–Union Turnpike station. The Q45 is a local route, making all stops on Union Turnpike between Queens Boulevard and 188th Street, before turning north at 188th Street and terminating in Fresh Meadows, Queens. The Q46 and Q48 are rush routes, making limited stops on Union Turnpike between Queens Boulevard and 188th Street, and local stops elsewhere. At their eastern ends, the Q48 travels to the Glen Oaks neighborhood of Queens, while the Q46 continues to Long Island Jewish Hospital (LIJ) in the village of Lake Success in Nassau County.

Originally a single bus route named the Q44A, the route was originally operated by the North Shore Bus Company from December 4, 1939, to 1947 when the company's routes were taken over by the New York City Board of Transportation. In 1974, the route was extended into Nassau County at Lakeville Road to serve LIJ Hospital. In 1977, limited-stop service on the route commenced, speeding up travel times for passengers in Eastern Queens. On April 12, 1990, the bus route was renumbered to Q46. It was extended from Lakeville Road to LIJ Hospital on September 7, 1997. Overnight and weekend service to Glen Oaks was eliminated in September 2002. On June 29, 2025, local service was spun off into the new Q45, and Glen Oaks service was spun off into the new Q48.

== Route description and service ==
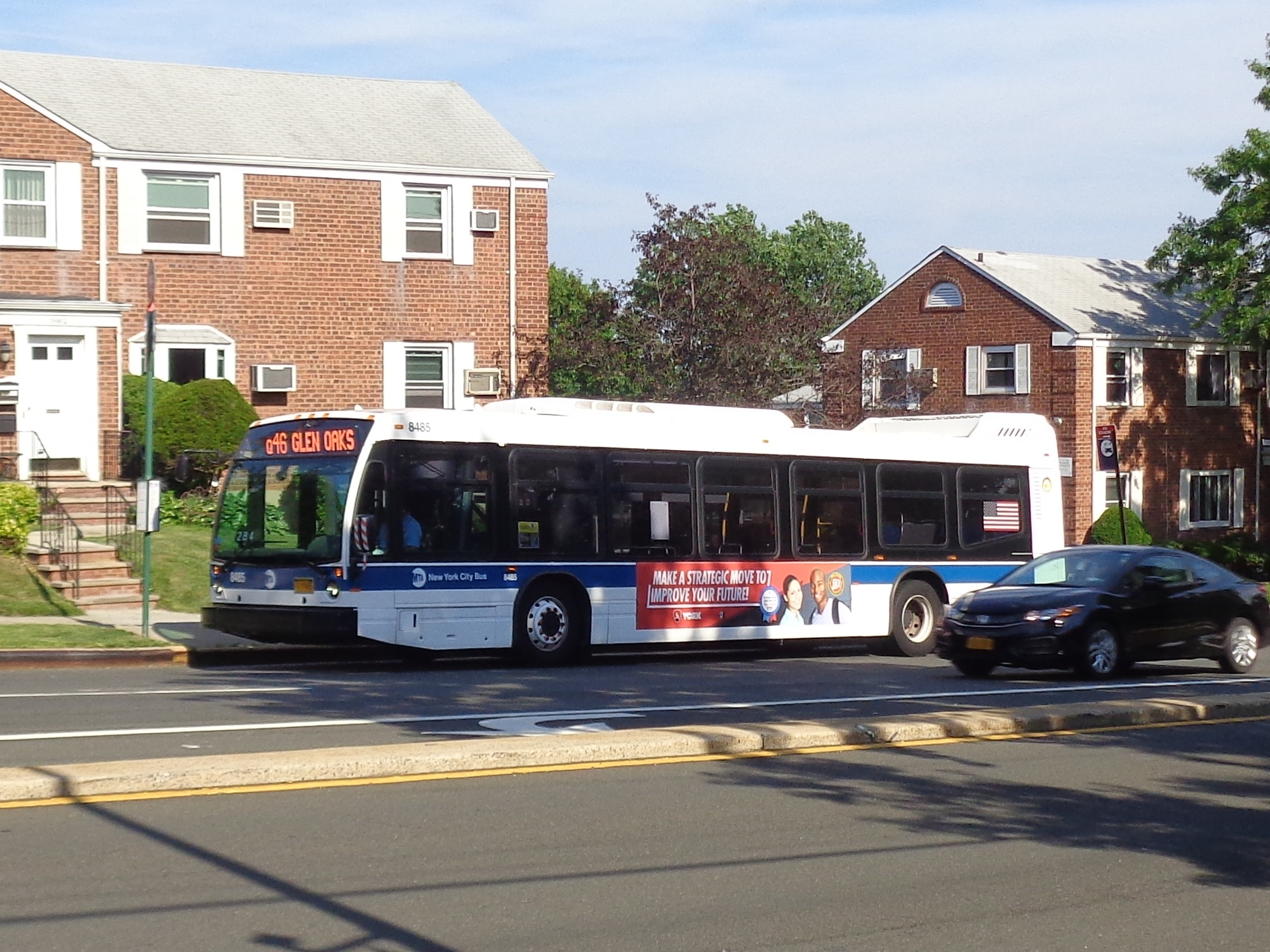
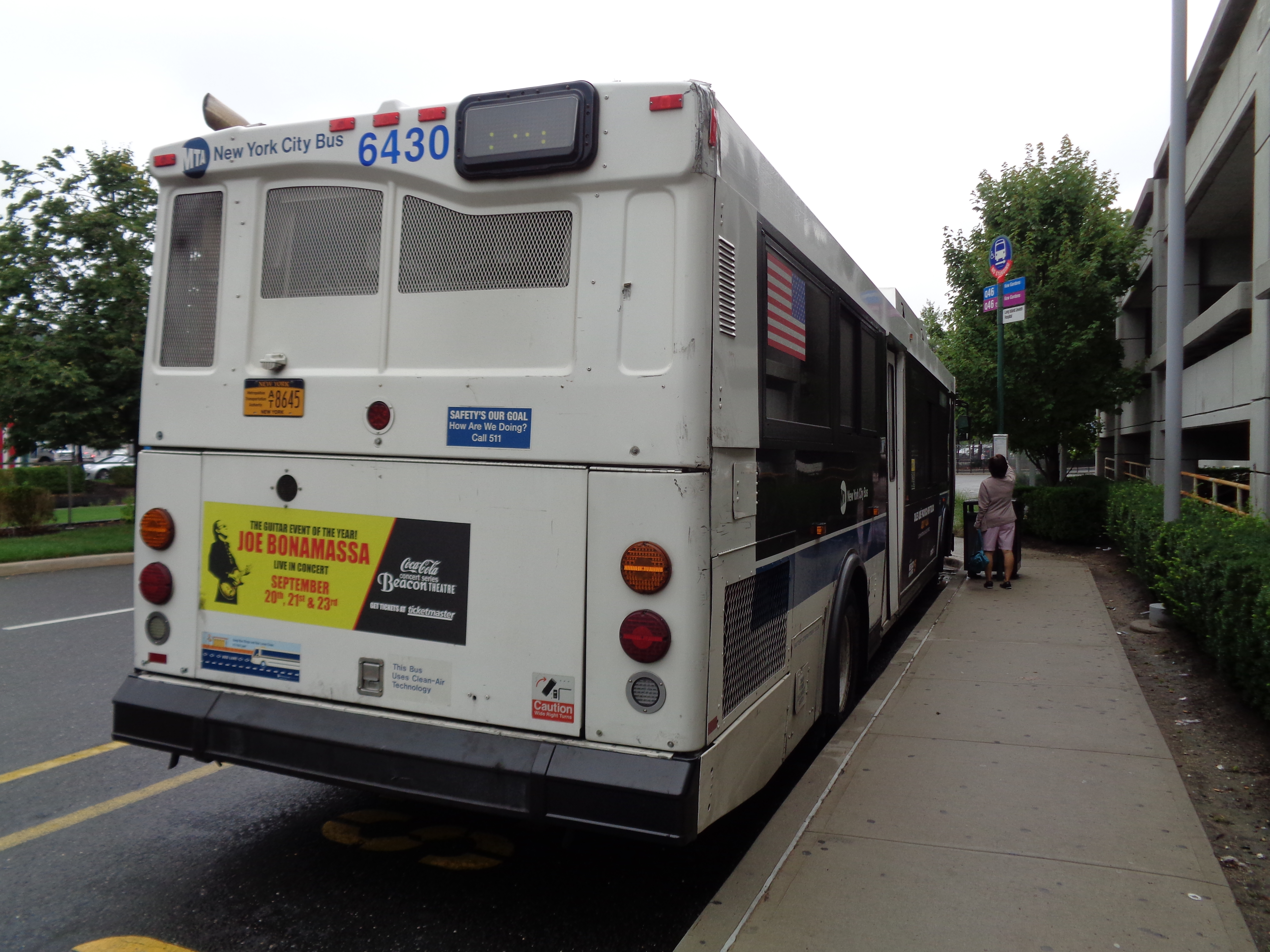
Two Q46 terminating buses: a 2015 Nova Bus LFS (8485) at Glen Oaks Village development (top), and a 2004 Orion VII OG HEV (6430) at LIJ Hospital (bottom)

The Q45, Q46, and Q48 begin on the north side of Queens Boulevard at the Kew Gardens–Union Turnpike station of the New York City Subway's IND Queens Boulevard Line, where there is a transfer to the E, F, and <F> trains. The route travels east via Union Turnpike. The Northeast Queens Bus Study, released in 2015, found that the Q46 has the largest single transfer from one route to a subway station with 5,965 weekday passengers transferring at the Kew Gardens–Union Turnpike subway station.

The Q45 turns north at 188th Street, running to 64th Avenue, where it terminates. The Q46 and Q48 continue east on Union Turnpike. At 260th Street in Glen Oaks, near the east end of Union Turnpike, the Q46 and Q48 split. The Q48, which only operates on weekdays, turns north onto 260th Street and terminates at Little Neck Parkway near the Queens County Farm Museum. The Q46 continues east on Union Turnpike until Lakeville Road, where the bus turns north, before briefly entering Nassau County and terminating at Long Island Jewish Medical Center (LIJ).

Prior to 2025, limited-stop service was operated along the Q46 route during rush hours in the peak direction, making limited stops between Queens Boulevard and Springfield Boulevard, and local stops east of Springfield Boulevard. The Q48 was once a local route that operated between Roosevelt Avenue and Main Street in Flushing and LaGuardia Airport in East Elmhurst via Roosevelt Avenue, 108th Street-31st Drive, and Ditmars Boulevard. The Q45 is classified as a "local" route, which makes local stops along Union Turnpike from Queens Boulevard to 188th Street, albeit with fewer stops than the original Q46 route prior to 2025. The Q46 and Q48 are both classified as "rush" routes, making limited stops in both directions along Union Turnpike west of 188th Street. Both routes make local stops east of 188th Street.

=== School trippers ===
When school is in session, several buses begin at Commonwealth Boulevard near a school complex and operate to Kew Gardens between 2:35 and 3:12pm, with one more departing at 3:51pm. These trips operate as the Q46 Rush. Two more Q46 buses depart across from Archbishop Molloy High School at Main/Manton Streets, and operate the full route to LIJ Hospital at 2:25 and 2:30pm. These trips head to Union Turnpike via Main Street.

== History ==
=== Early years ===
The North Shore Bus Company began operating a bus route along Union Turnpike on December 4, 1939. Prior to World War II, the route was originally the Union Turnpike branch of the Q44, running between Queens Boulevard in Kew Gardens and 188th Street. By 1942, the route was extended to Hollis Court Boulevard at the east end of Cunningham Park. It was later renamed the Q44A. North Shore Bus became bankrupt, and as a result this route, along with the company's 26 other routes were taken over by the New York City Board of Transportation in March 1947.

On August 12, 1947, the United Civic Council advocated for the extension of the Q44A, then under city control, from Hollis Court Boulevard to Springfield Boulevard. At the time, the extension had preliminary approval from some of the members of the Board of Transportation. This extension took place on September 7, but only after pressure from civic organizations. On November 30, 1947, under city control, the Q44A was extended from Springfield Boulevard to Glen Oaks Village at Union Turnpike and 251st Street to serve new apartments there. In January 1948 the route was extended to 257th Street.

On January 13, 1950, a spur of the Q44A was approved to turn off at 260th Street and operate via 260th Street to Little Neck Parkway. Service began on February 5, 1950. Previously, all Q44A buses continued along Union Turnpike to the Nassau County line at Lakeville Road. This spur provided direct service to Glen Oaks Village, sparing its residents a half-mile walk. This extension had been requested on December 16, 1949, and the public hearing was held on January 12, 1950.

=== Express service and route extension ===
==== Q44A Express ====
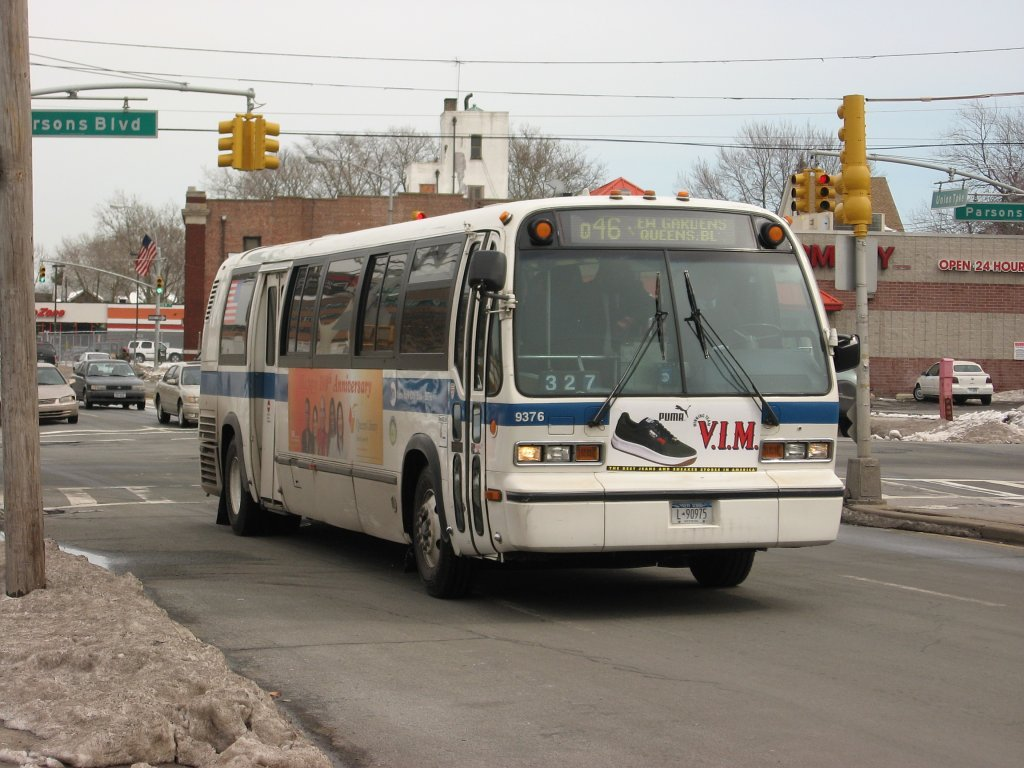
A 1997 Nova Bus RTS-06 (9376) on the Q46 to Kew Gardens, at Parsons Boulevard in Kew Gardens Hills, Queens, before replacement by...

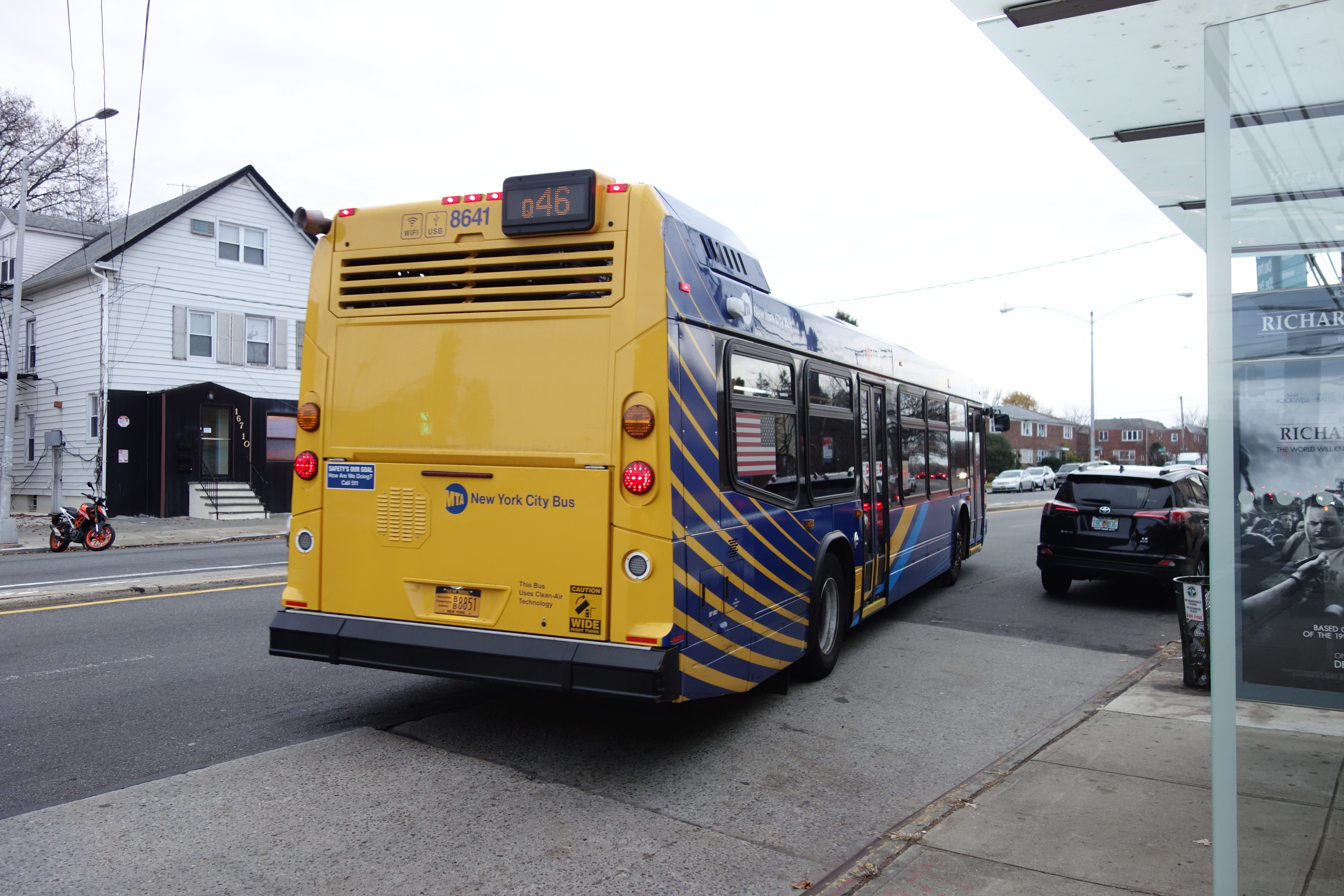
...the 2019 Nova Bus LFS, like this one (8641) on the Kew Gardens-bound Q46 at Union Turnpike/168th Street in November 2019

In December 1950, the North Cunningham Civic Association advocated for the implementation of zone express service along the route in the peak direction during rush hours. The group suggested having some buses run local to Utopia Parkway, some only making stops between Utopia Parkway and Hollis Court Boulevard, some only making stops between Hollis Court Boulevard and Commonwealth Boulevard, with the final variant only making stops east of the Cross Island Parkway. On June 28, 1954, express service on the Q44A began, with expresses leaving the City Line between 6:59 a.m. and 8:27 a.m. and leaving from the Kew Gardens subway station between 5:30 p.m. and 6:30 p.m.. These buses ran in the peak direction and made transfer stops at Main Street and Utopia Parkway, and were expected to save 5 to 7 minutes.

In 1974, the New York City Transit Authority (NYCTA) began to study whether bus service could be sped up using computerized traffic signals. The Q44A was the chosen route as it serves as a subway feeder and as a connector to major hospitals. In the late 1950s, the route carried as many as 7.5 million passengers per year, but that figure decreased to 3.78 million by 1976. Union Turnpike received computerized traffic signals before other streets, but it did little to cut travel times for bus passengers. As part of the plan, it was decided that a zone express concept could be used on the Q44A without inconveniencing many passengers, while benefiting a majority of them.

Limited-stop service began on April 18, 1977 with the intent of attracting new riders to the route. Along with the M15, the two routes became the first to use limited service in the city. Limited-stop service would be bidirectional during the AM rush hour, and peak-direction (heading east) during the PM rush hour. These limited-stop buses were labeled as expresses. Eastbound expresses only stopped at Court House (only east-bound), Main Street, 149th Street, and Springfield Boulevard before making all stops. After running local to Winchester Boulevard, westbound expresses only stopped at Cloverdale Boulevard (226th Street), Springfield Boulevard, 149th Street, Main Street, and the subway. Some buses on the Glen Oaks Branch used to continue up Little Neck Parkway, turning west on the Grand Central Parkway service road, and turning onto Commonwealth Road, going east on the Grand Central Parkway service road, before it terminated at Little Neck Parkway and 260th Street. Between 4:50 and 6:35 PM, local service only ran to Springfield Boulevard, and free transfers were issued to continue past Springfield Boulevard via express Q44As. The express Q44As were also intended to compete with privately owned expresses buses operated by Queens Surface–travel times were 20 minutes shorter and the fare was $5 less.

The Q44A expresses were able to take advantage of the timed traffic signals for the first time, cutting scheduled running time to 27 minutes from 33 minutes. The average terminal-to-terminal speed of the zone expresses was better than 18 miles per hour (29 km/h)–significantly higher than on any other bus route in the city. Seat availability increased by 40%, travel times were reduced by 24%, and passengers from the outer reaches of Eastern Queens could get to Midtown Manhattan in less than an hour. All of this was possible with no change in labor costs, no additional vehicles, and with a slight increase in fuel consumption. Q44A express service increased ridership on the route by 15%.

==== Extension and changes in service ====
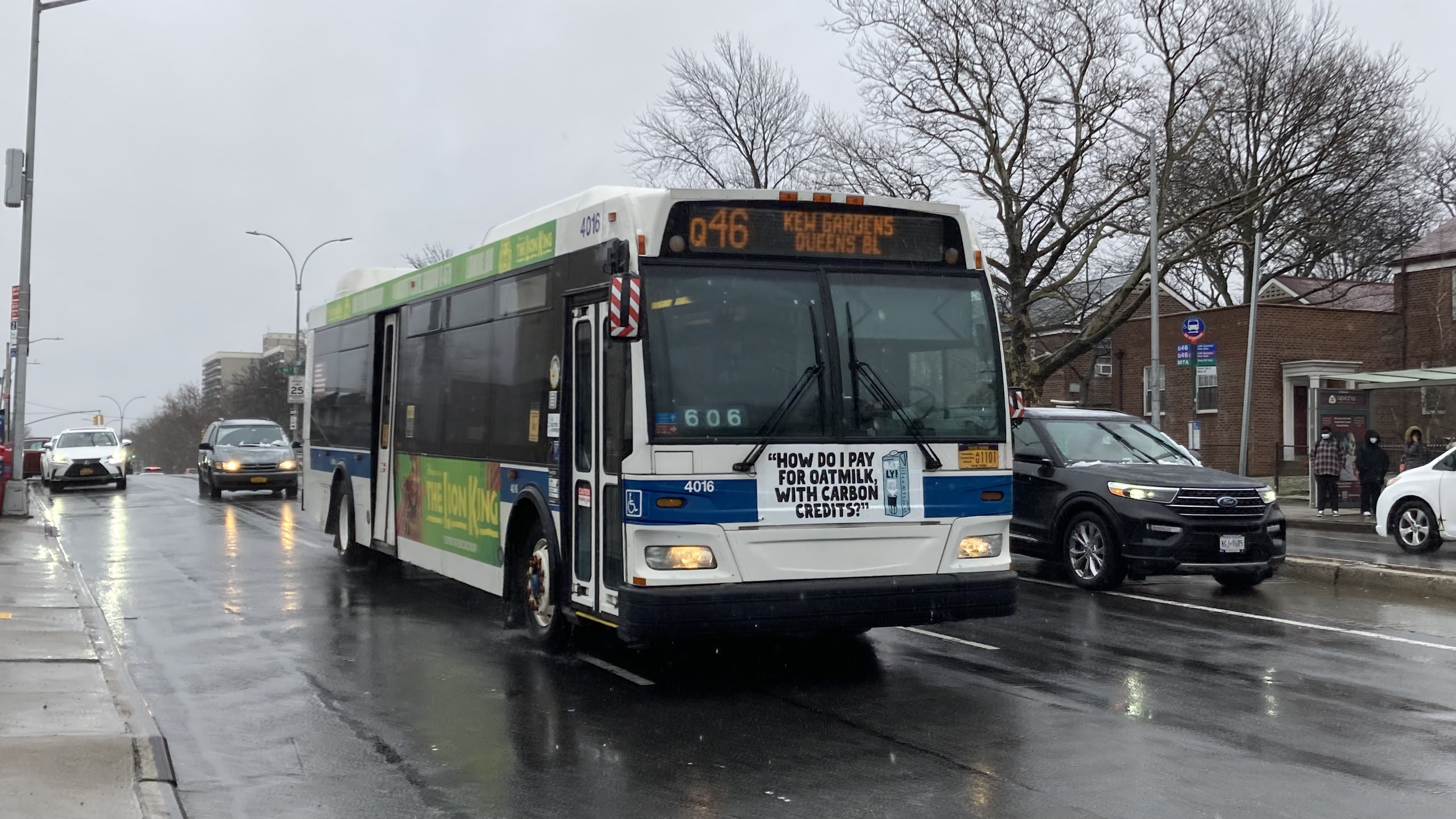
A 2009 Orion VII NG HEV (4016) on the Q46 to Kew Gardens, on Union Turnpike just before Main Street

In April 1974, an extension of the Q44A to LIJ Hospital was approved, which made it the first city route to extend into Nassau County. The extension was approved by Queens Borough President Donald Manes and Nassau County Executive Ralph Caso, and it was first proposed by the Lost Community Civic Association of Floral Park. The extension faced legal hurdles–the NYCTA did not authorize it to operate any franchised service outside city limits. However, in 1968, with the passage of the Metropolitan Transportation Authority Act, the NYCTA became subordinate to the MTA, which could determine transit plans and policies for the NYCTA. The head of the MTA, William Ronan, searched for a legal mechanism to allow for the extension. The decided course of action included a request for the service by the Queens Borough President and approval by the Nassau County Executive, an approval or no objection by the New York City Comptroller and approval by the Mayor.

When the Queens Village Depot was opened on September 8, 1974, the Q44A was reassigned from Flushing Depot (the former North Shore Bus Company facility). Around this time, there was a third branch in Little Neck, separate from the Glen Oaks branch. This branch diverged north at Commonwealth Boulevard, running along Commonwealth and the Grand Central Parkway service road and terminating at Little Neck Parkway. On March 4, 1979, after years of requests from local residents, the terminal loop of the Q44A was changed. Instead of operating via 270th Street between Union Turnpike and 77th Avenue, and along 77th Avenue from 270th Street to Hewlett Avenue, buses would run along Lakeville Road, 77th Avenue, and Hewlett Avenue, and back onto Lakeville Road.

The Q44A was renumbered to the Q46 on April 12, 1990. The Q46 was extended from Lakeville Road to LIJ Hospital on September 7, 1997, saving a half-mile walk. On November 17, 1997, limited-stop buses started to make an additional stop at 150th Street.

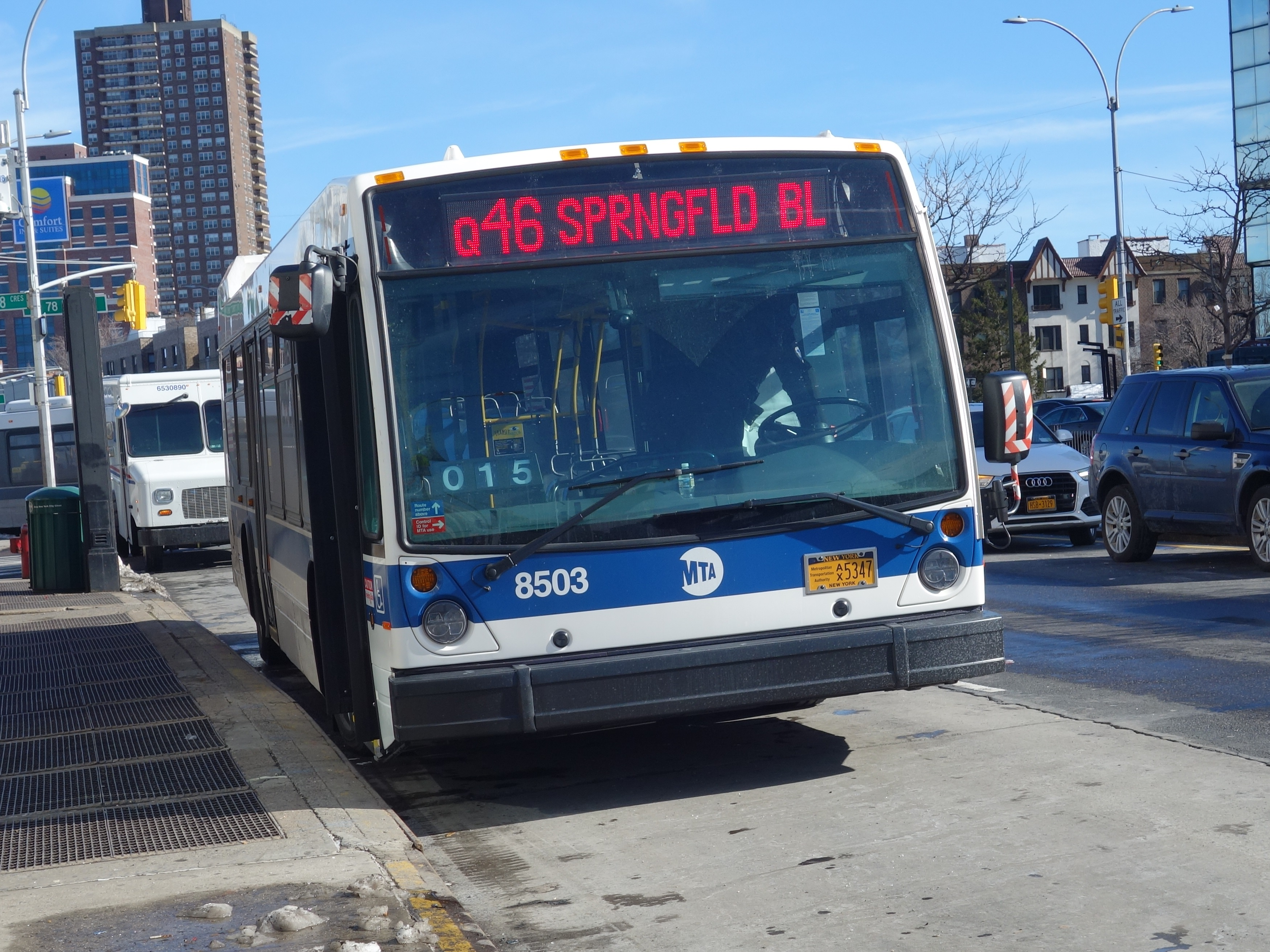
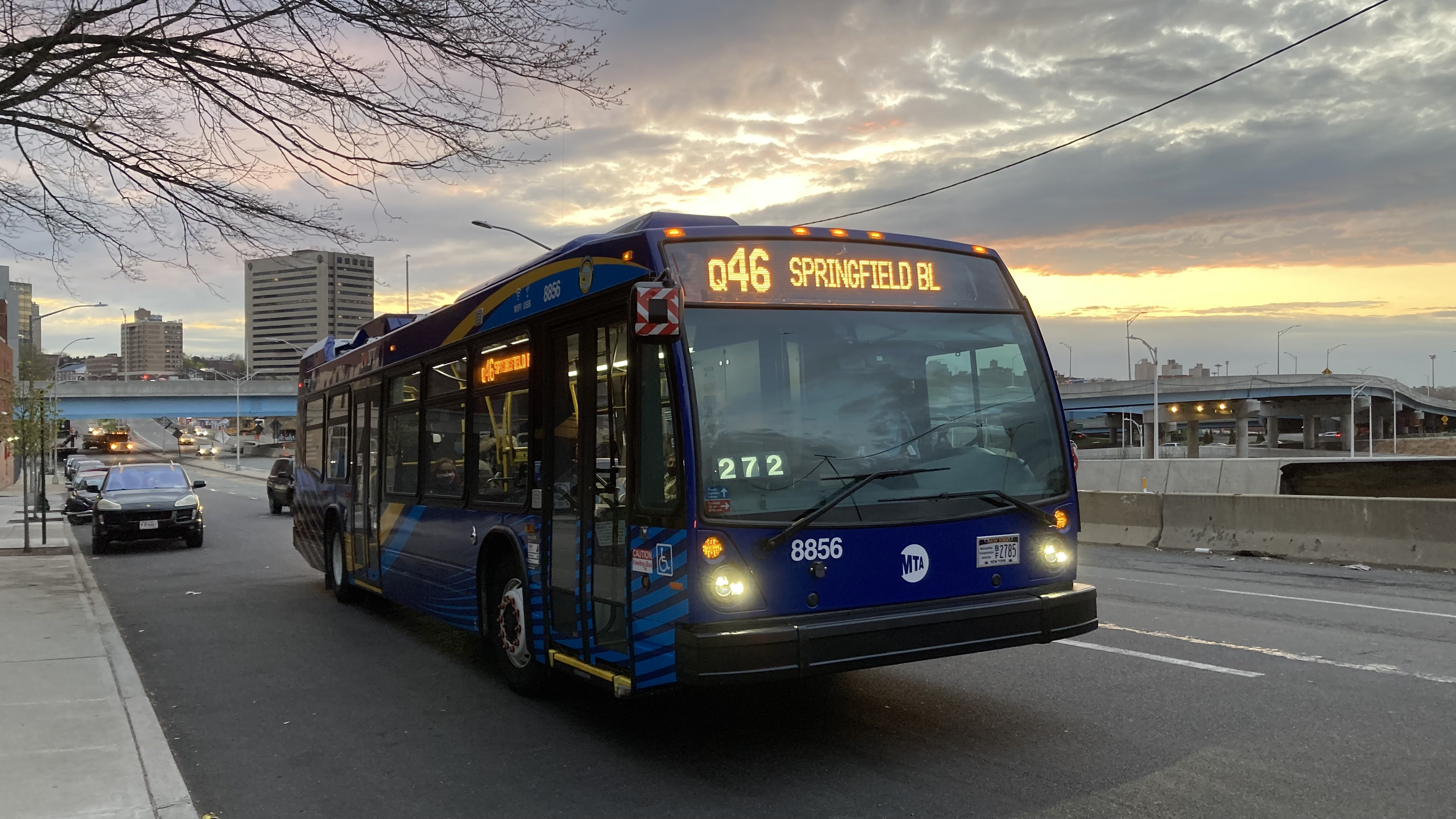
Two Nova Bus LFSs on the Q46 local: one 2016 (8503) at Queens Blvd/78 Crescent in March 2018, and one 2022 (8856) on Union Turnpike at the Kew Gardens Interchange. Those buses were to terminate at Springfield Blvd during rush hour.

In July 2002, the MTA announced a plan to eliminate overnight and weekend service to Glen Oaks, and operate all Q46 service during these periods to LIJ Hospital. At the time, about one-third of weekend trips, and 40 percent of late night trips served the branch to Glen Oaks even though there was limited demand on that branch. The change was intended to provide more frequent service to the more heavily used branch to LIJ, reducing headways from 30 to 40 minutes to 15 to 20 minutes late nights, and from 10 to 20 minutes weekends to every 10 minutes. Riders using the Glen Oaks branch would have to walk an average of 1,500 feet (460 m) to the nearest Union Turnpike bus stop. While the Glen Oaks branch was mainly used for school and work trips during the peak hours, LIJ, being a major hospital complex, generated trips 24/7. On an average November 2001 weekday, between 11 p.m. and 1 a.m., there were 53 riders on the LIJ branch and only 7 on the Glen Oaks branch. Riders on the LIJ branch also outnumbered Glen Oaks branch riders 650 to 65 on Saturdays, and 400 to 45 on Sundays. The change was expected to cost $15,000 annually and it took effect on September 8, 2002.

The operation of reverse-peak limited-stop service in the morning rush hour was approved by the MTA Board in October 2005. On February 2, 2008, the LIJ branch's terminal was moved to Lakeville Road outside the hospital gates due to construction within the hospital grounds, particularly a new women's hospital adjacent to the bus stop. The Katz Women's Hospital was completed in December 2011, and the Q46 began running to a new terminal within the hospital.

The Northeast Queens Bus Study was released in 2015, and recommended, for the long term, the implementation of a pilot program for limited-zone bus service on one or more routes in Northeast Queens including the Q46. The study also recommended the implementation of Select Bus Service along Union Turnpike. On October 20, 2017, the New York City Department of Transportation released the Bus Forward report, and suggested that Select Bus Service be implemented along Union Turnpike and 20 other corridors citywide.

==== Queens bus redesign ====
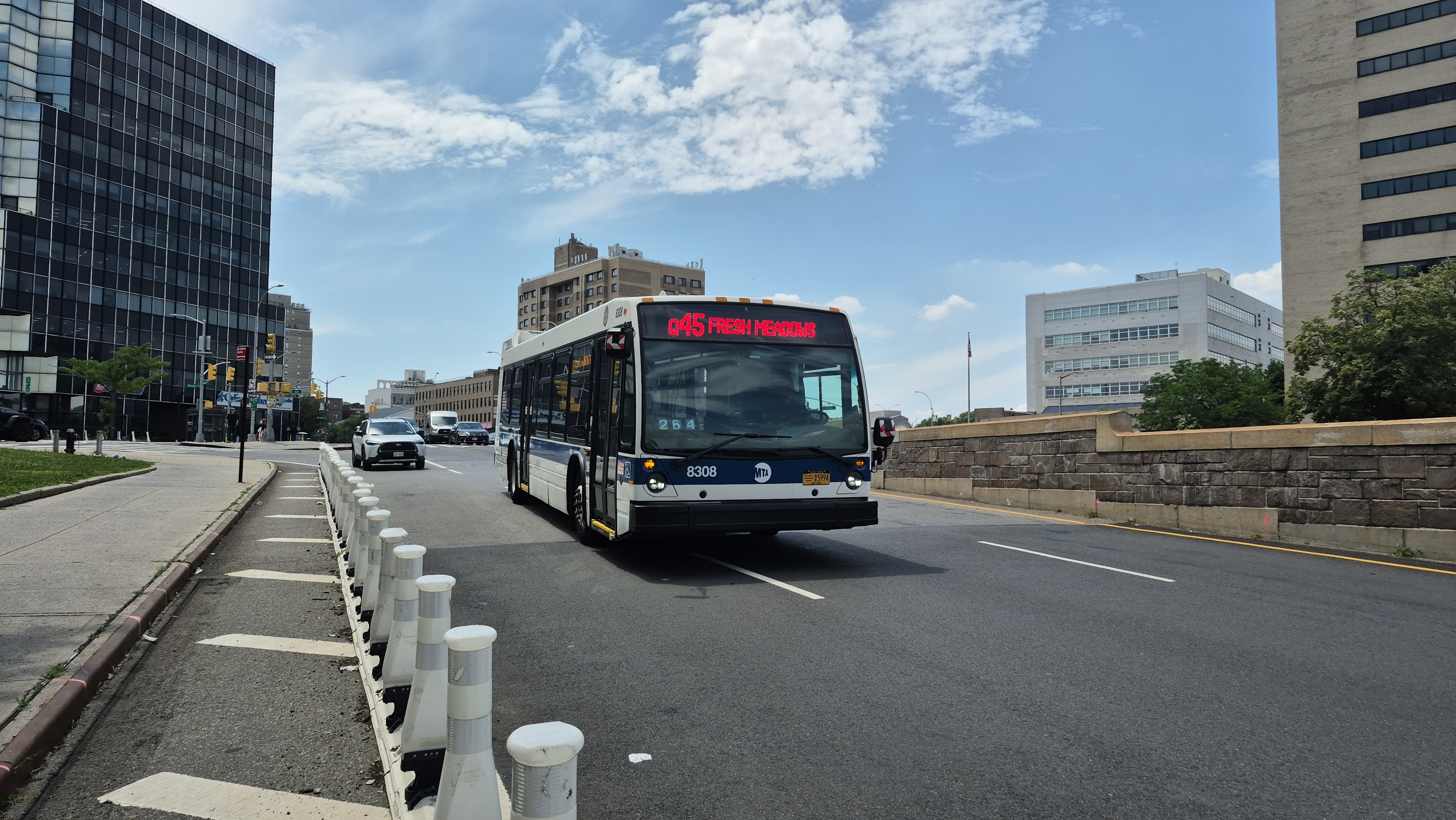
2016 Nova LFS #8308 on the Q45 Local in June 2025.

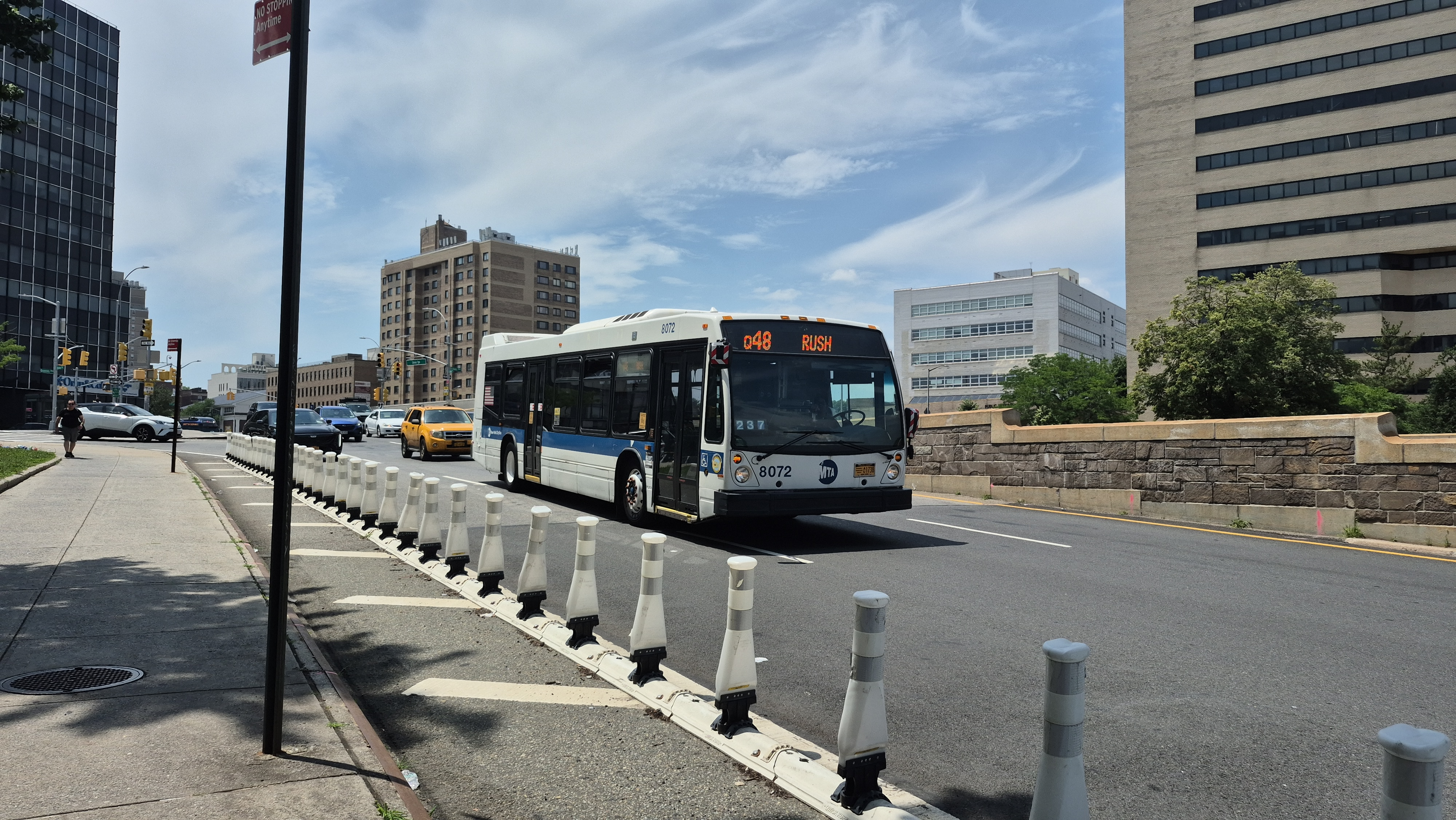
2011 Nova LFS #8072 on the Q48 Rush in June 2025.

In December 2019, the MTA released a draft redesign of the Queens bus network. As part of the redesign, the Q46 would have been replaced by a "subway connector" route called the QT32, which would run nonstop from Kew Gardens to 188th Street. Local service between these points would have been provided by a "neighborhood" route, the QT11, which would run from Fresh Meadows to East Elmhurst. The redesign was delayed due to the COVID-19 pandemic in New York City in 2020, and the original draft plan was dropped due to negative feedback.

A revised plan was released in March 2022. Under the new plan, the branch to Queens County Farm Museum would be called the Q48, while the LIJ branch would retain the Q46 designation; both lines would be "zone" routes with a nonstop section from Kew Gardens to 188th Street. The Q23 would have been extended to Fresh Meadows to provide local service between these points.

A final bus-redesign plan was released in December 2023. The Q23 would not be rerouted onto Union Turnpike; instead, the final plan involved the creation of a new "limited-stop" route, the Q45, from 188th Street in Fresh Meadows to Kew Gardens–Union Turnpike. The Q46 would still become a zone route, traveling to LIJ 24/7 and making few stops west of 188th Street. The Queens County Farm Museum branch would become a zone route called the Q48, which would operate only on weekdays and would also make few stops west of 188th Street.

On December 17, 2024, addendums to the final plan were released. Among these, stops on the Q46 and new Q48 were modified. On January 29, 2025, the current plan was approved by the MTA Board, and the Queens Bus Redesign went into effect in two different phases during Summer 2025. After the approval, the Q45 was rebranded as a “Local” route due to stop spacing. All three routes are part of Phase I, which started on June 29, 2025, but the Q48 started on June 30 as it is a weekday-only route.

== Connecting bus routes ==
- Q10, Q37, Q60, Q80 (at Queens Boulevard)
- Q20, Q44 SBS (at Main Street)
- Q25 (at Parsons Boulevard)
- Q65 (at 164th Street)
- Q30, Q31, Q75 (at Utopia Parkway)
- Q17 (at 188th Street)
- Q76 (at Francis Lewis Boulevard)
- Q27, Q88 (at Springfield Boulevard)
- Q36 (at Little Neck Parkway)

== See also ==
- Union Turnpike express buses
- Q74 (New York City bus, 1940–2010), formerly along Main Street from Queens College to Kew Gardens–Union Turnpike
