= Glen Oaks, Queens =

Neighborhood in New York City

Glen Oaks
- Neighborhood of Queens
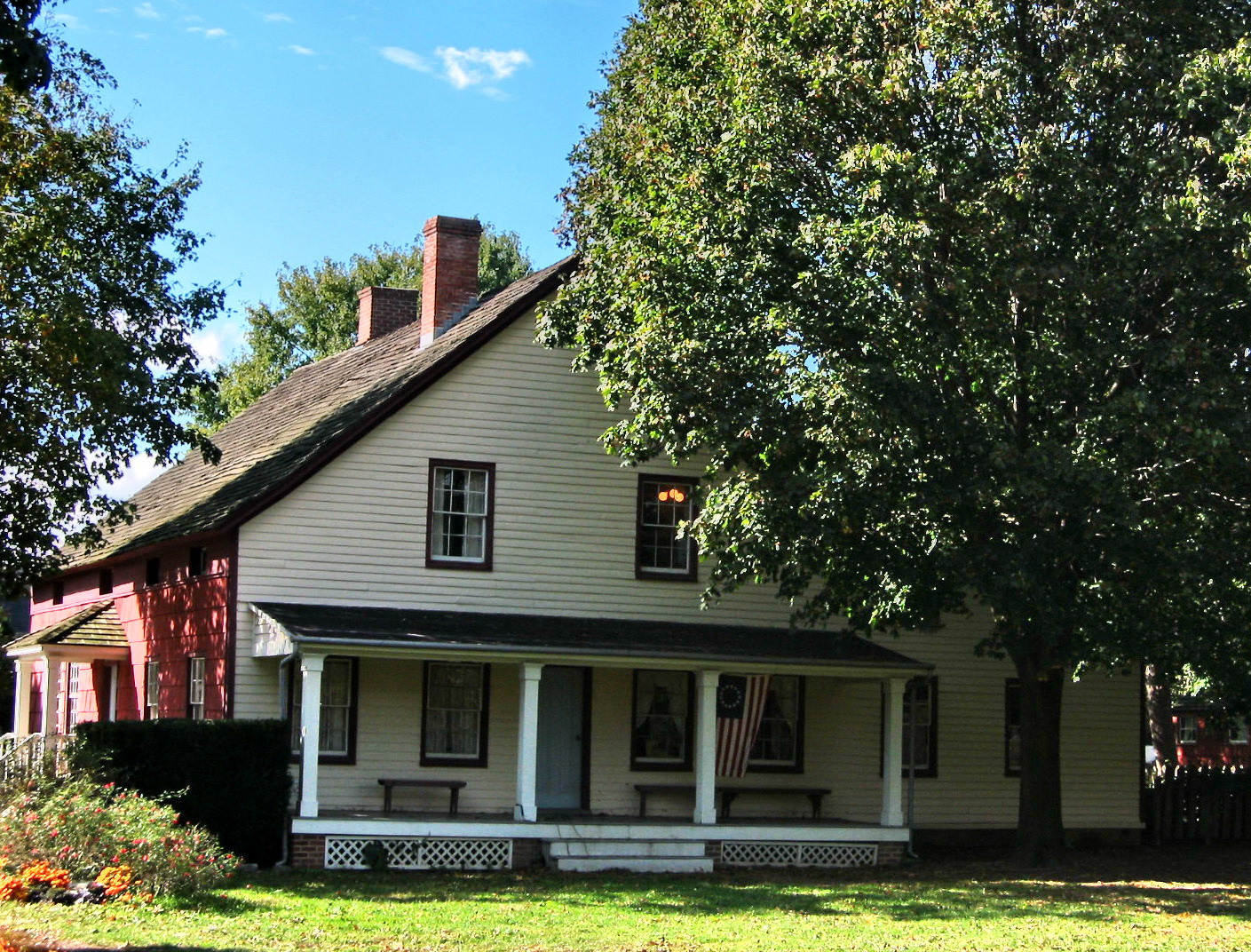
- Queens County Farm Museum
- Interactive map of Glen Oaks
- Coordinates: 40.75°N 73.71°W
- Country: United States
- State: New York
- City: New York City
- County/Borough: Queens
- Community District: Queens 13

Population (2020)
  - Total: 27,546

Ethnicity
  - White Non-Hispanic: 47.3%
  - Black: 20.7%
  - Hispanic (Are of any origin): 28.1%
  - Asian: 27.3%
  - Other/Multiracial: 3.1%

Economics $109,276
- ZIP Code: 11004, 11005, 11040 (partial), 11426 (partial)
- Area codes: 718, 347, 929, and 917

Glen Oaks is the easternmost neighborhood of the New York City borough of Queens. The neighborhood is part of Queens Community Board 13 and borders Nassau County to the east.

== Location ==
Glen Oaks lies between Grand Central Parkway and Nassau County to the north, Union Turnpike to the south, the Queens/Nassau border (Lakeville Road) to the east, and the Cross Island Parkway to the west. Despite not being on the border, many homeowners in Floral Park use Glen Oaks as their mailing address. In this area, the Queens/Nassau border separates New York City from the Village of Lake Success to the north, and the Unincorporated Town of North New Hyde Park to the east. The Queens/Nassau border is referred to locally as "the city line" and is so designated on New York City buses. Union Turnpike is the main commercial road in the area.

The northern edge of Glen Oaks is a line of hills which are part of the terminal moraine of the last glacial period. These hills include the highest point in Queens: 258.2 feet (78.7 m) above sea level. The southern part of Glen Oaks is a glacial outwash plain.

The postal ZIP Code zones for this area do not follow political boundaries, even crossing the city line. The easternmost part of the neighborhood is in the 11040 ZIP code, addressed as New Hyde Park. The northernmost part of the neighborhood—the North Shore Towers complex—is in the 11005 ZIP code, addressed as Floral Park. The portion of the neighborhood west of Little Neck Parkway—other than the Queens County Farm Museum—is in the 11426 ZIP code, addressed as Bellerose. Finally, the central part of the neighborhood is in the 11004 ZIP code, which may be addressed as either Glen Oaks or Floral Park. Since the ZIP codes cross the city line, they cannot be used as the sole means to determine sales tax rates. This has caused problems for area residents.

North of Glen Oaks is Little Neck. The Queens neighborhoods of Bellerose and Floral Park lie south of Glen Oaks. The Nassau County villages of Bellerose and Floral Park lie south of the Queens neighborhoods with the same names. East of Glen Oaks (past Lake Success) is the unincorporated neighborhood of North New Hyde Park. South of North New Hyde Park is the Village of New Hyde Park. So even though Glen Oaks shares various postal city names with Nassau County villages, it is not adjacent to those villages and is not politically related to them other than being in the same state. The right-of-way of the historical Long Island Motor Parkway is now the southernmost edge of the parking lot of Green Meadows Farm. East of Little Neck Parkway, the Motor Parkway route is now 74th Avenue, including Tenney Park. The route also defines the southern border of the North Shore Towers complex (formerly the Glen Oaks Golf Club).

== Residences ==
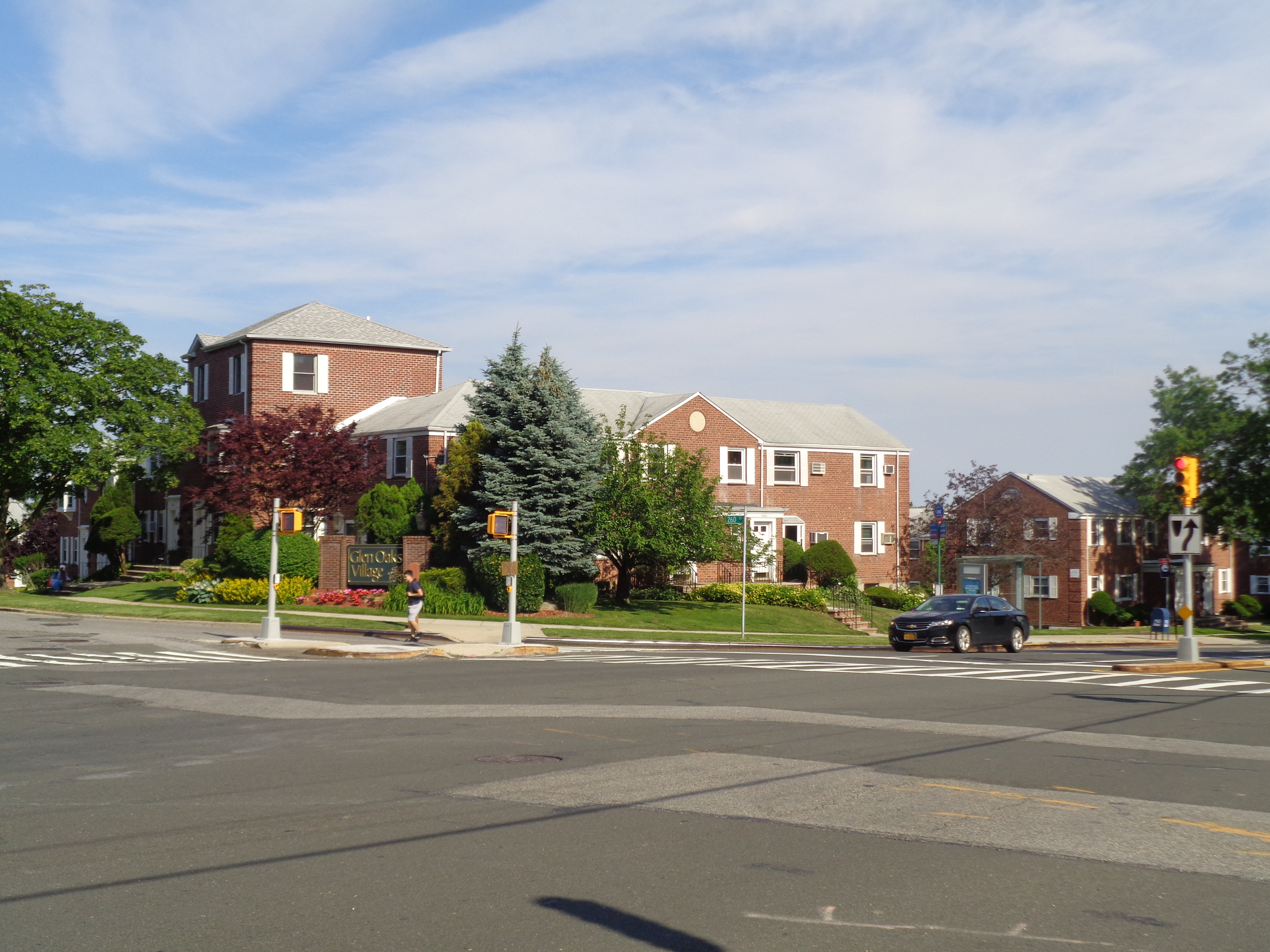
The Glen Oaks Village development, at Little Neck Parkway and 260th Street.

Garden apartments dominate this community. The major owners are:

- Glen Oaks Village (established in 1947): This Cooperative Apartment complex extends from Little Neck Parkway eastwards to 263rd Street, north to the Royal Ranch, and south to Union Turnpike.

The other section extends from Commonwealth Boulevard to 249th Street.

- Parkwood Estates: Originally named Grand Central Apartments is a cooperative apartment complex north of Little Neck Parkway.
- North Shore Towers (circa 1970s): A private high-rise apartment complex and country club built in the mid-1970s.
- Royal Ranch (circa 1951): On the same hill as the North Shore Towers is a predominately single family residence community.

== Parks and recreation ==
The Glen Oaks Oval consists of 3 acres (1.2 ha) located at the intersection of 260th Street and 74th Avenue (the intersection is a traffic circle around the park). It serves as the home of Glen Oaks Little League as well as having playground and exercise equipment. It was originally named Glen Oaks Park. In 1977 it was named Tenney Park after Jerry Tenney, a former owner of Glen Oaks Village. However, it is most commonly known as "The Oval", after its shape. The official name was changed to Glen Oaks Oval in 2009 after much of the public urged Bob Friedrich (a politician who represents Glen Oaks) to request a change.

There is also a 2-acre (8,100 m^{2}) playground at Little Neck Parkway and 72nd Avenue, adjacent to P.S. 186. South of the playground on Little Neck Parkway is the Queens County Farm Museum, 47.7 acres (19.3 ha) that re-create the historic agricultural phase of the county, housing an array of farm animals and antique farming equipment.

== Hospital ==
The 548-bed, 48-acre (19 ha) Long Island Jewish Medical Center is located within Glen Oaks, and is one of the largest medical facilities on Long Island.

On December 14, 2020, Sandra Lindsay, a critical care nurse in Glen Oaks made history, as the first person in the United States to receive the Coronavirus Vaccine.

== Education ==
=== Schools ===
Glen Oaks is covered by two public elementary (K-5) school zones: P.S. 186, and P.S. 115. Students graduating from these schools attend middle (grades 6-8) school M.S. 172. A Roman Catholic school, Our Lady of the Snows, is an alternative for grades K-8. In 2004, a public school campus—the Frank A. Padavan campus—was opened in western Glen Oaks. This section of land was previously part of the Creedmoor Psychiatric Center. The campus includes The Queens High School of Teaching and two elementary/intermediate (grades K-8) schools: P.S./I.S. 208 and P.S./I.S. 266. P.S./I.S. 266 serves students across District 26, chosen by lottery from applicants. P.S./I.S. 208 does not serve Glen Oaks students. (Its zone includes just the sliver of Glen Oaks west of Commonwealth Boulevard, which is not residential.) Typically the district 26 schools have been ranked among the best in the NYC public school system.

Several institutions on or near Union Turnpike are associated with Glen Oaks, though they are not actually in Glen Oaks. For example, Bellerose Jewish Center, the Glen Oaks branch of the Queens Library, and Glen Oaks School (P.S. 115) are all in the Floral Park neighborhood. So are M.S. 172 and Our Lady of the Snows. In contrast, P.S. 186 is in the center of Glen Oaks, but is named Castlewood School. The Queens County Farm is also in the center of Glen Oaks (and has the Glen Oaks/Floral Park zip code) but the group that operates it is the Colonial Farmhouse Restoration Society of Bellerose.

=== Library ===
The Glen Oaks branch of the Queens Public Library is located at 256-04 Union Turnpike. The current building, redesigned by the architects Scott Marble and Karen Fairbanks in 2013, replaced the original library (demolished in 2010). The new library is twice the size of the old one, and has won numerous awards, from design through completion.

== Transportation ==
The Q36, Q46 and Q48 local buses and the QM5, QM6, QM8, QM35 and QM36 express buses serve the area.

The following major arteries serve the community:

- Interstate 495 (Long Island Expressway)
- Grand Central Parkway
- Cross Island Parkway
- Union Turnpike, a surface road
- Little Neck Parkway, a surface road

Bike lanes exist along sections of 260th Street, 74th Avenue, and 82nd Avenue.

The area also serves Long Island Rail Road commuters, who can access the Little Neck station via the Q36 bus, which terminates at the station. Commuters also have the option of traveling to the New Hyde Park or Floral Park stations. These stations provide rail connections to Penn Station and Grand Central Madison in Manhattan.

Near its border with Nassau County, Glen Oaks has 271st Street, the highest-numbered street in the Queens street grid.

== Notable people ==
- Karl Ehrhardt (1924–2008), "Sign Man" who was one of the New York Mets' most visible fans and an icon at Shea Stadium from 1964 through 1981.
- Martin Lang (born 1949), Olympic fencer
- Frank Wilczek (born 1951), theoretical physicist and mathematician who was awarded the Nobel Prize in Physics in 2004.
