= Little Neck Parkway =

Boulevard in Queens, New York

Little Neck Pkwy
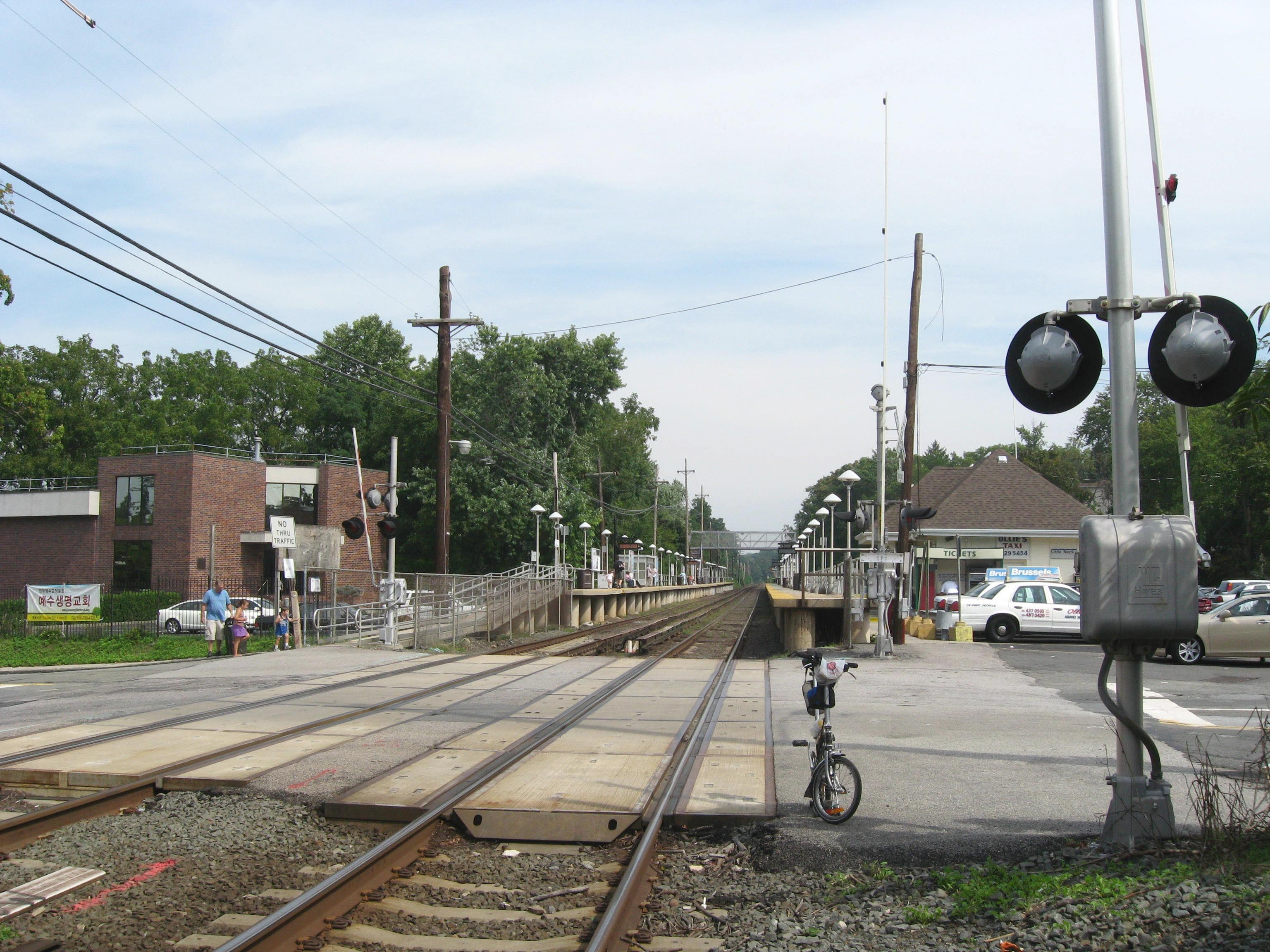
- Crossing the LIRR tracks in Little Neck
- Interactive map of Little Neck Parkway
- Former name: Little Neck Road
- Owner: City of New York
- Maintained by: NYCDOT
- Location: Queens, New York City
- Coordinates: 40.7361°N 73.7135°W
- South end: NY 25 (Jericho Turnpike) in Bellerose
- Major junctions: NY 25B in Bellerose Manor; Grand Central Parkway in Glen Oaks; I-495 in Little Neck; NY 25A in Little Neck
- North end: 255th Street in Little Neck

Little Neck Parkway (formerly Little Neck Road) is the easternmost, major north–south route in the northern portion of the New York City borough of Queens, traveling between the neighborhoods of Little Neck and Bellerose.

== Route description ==
North of Northern Boulevard (NY 25A), the parkway is a local residential street and the main north–south thoroughfare on Udalls Cove. South of there, it is a two- to four-lane road, which becomes divided south of the Grand Central Parkway. South of Hillside Avenue (NY 25B), it widens to six lanes. Its southern terminus is at Jericho Turnpike (NY 25) at the Queens–Nassau border.

South of Jericho Turnpike, Little Neck Parkway becomes Tulip Avenue, which continues southeast through western Nassau County.

== Transportation ==
Little Neck Parkway has one of the few at-grade railroad crossings of the Long Island Rail Road in New York City, located at the Little Neck station; it is also the only at-grade crossing of the Port Washington Branch of the LIRR.

The following bus routes serve Little Neck Parkway:

- The Q36 bus runs between Jericho Turnpike and either 41st Avenue (Little Neck LIRR station), or 40th Avenue (Jamaica).
- From there, service is replaced with the QM5, QM8 and QM35 buses until Long Island Expressway
- The Q48 runs from 73rd Road to 260th Street, where it terminates.
- The Q30 uses the parkway from Horace Harding Expressway to Nassau Boulevard to change direction from Little Neck to Jamaica.

== Landmarks ==
- Queens County Farm Museum

== See also ==
- Springfield Boulevard
- Utopia Parkway (Queens)
- Woodhaven and Cross Bay Boulevards
