= Hillside Avenue buses =

Bus routes in Queens, New York

q1 q36 rush, q43 rush, q82 rush
- Hillside Avenue Line; Jamaica−Queens Village/City Line
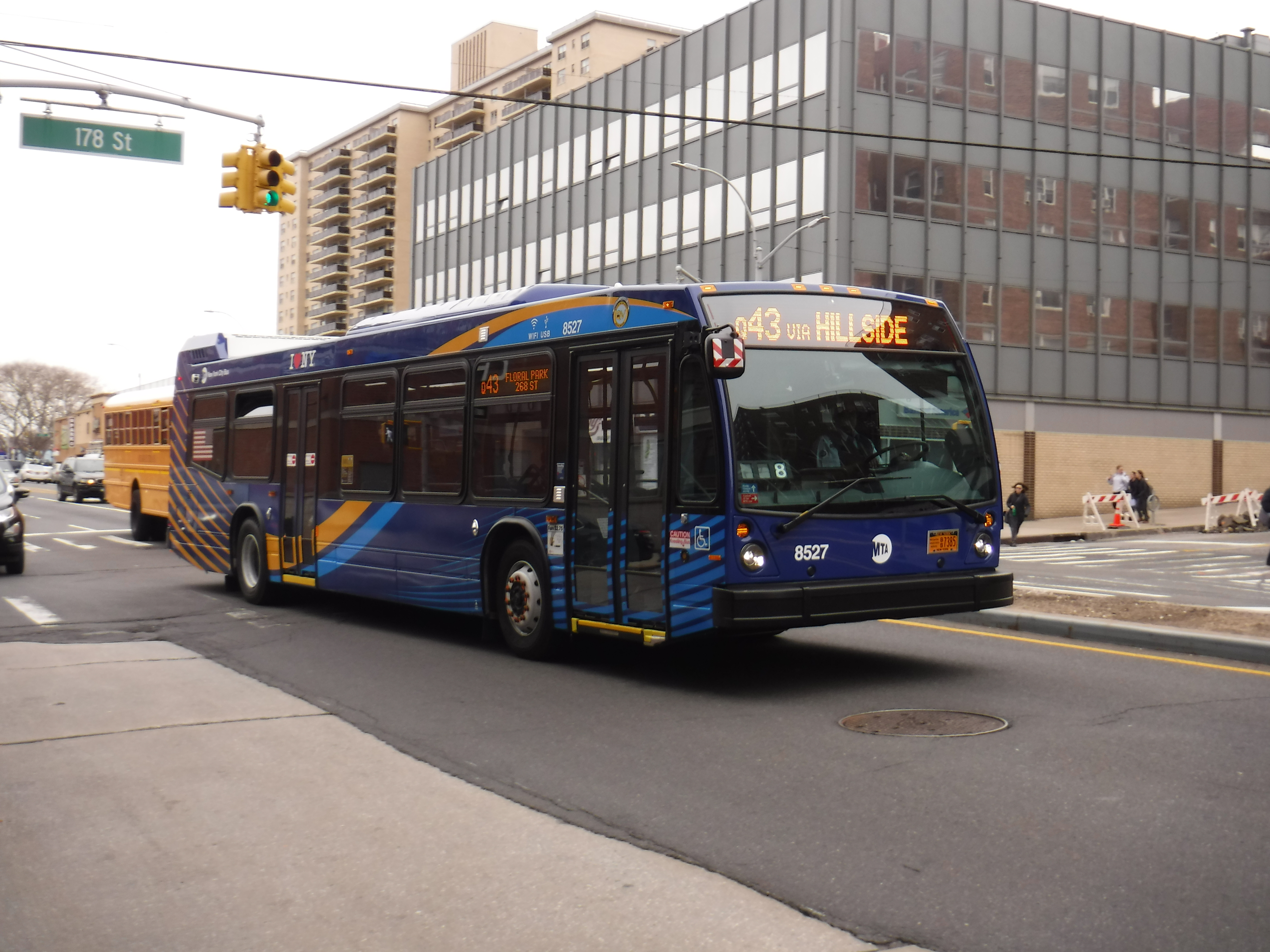
- A 2019 Nova Bus LFS (8527) on the Floral Park-bound Q43 at Hillside Avenue/178th Street

Overview
- System: MTA Regional Bus Operations
- Operator: New York City Transit Authority
- Garage: Queens Village Depot
- Vehicle: Nova Bus LFS

Route
- Locale: Queens, New York, U.S.
- Communities served: Jamaica, Jamaica Estates, Hollis, Queens Village, Bellerose, Glen Oaks, Little Neck, Floral Park
- Start: Jamaica: Q1 & Q43: Sutphin Boulevard / LIRR station; Q36 & Q82: 168th Street Bus Terminal
- Via: Hillside Avenue
- End: Q1: Bellerose – 243rd Street and Braddock Avenue; Q36: Little Neck LIRR station; Q43: Floral Park – 268th Street and Hillside Avenue; Q82: UBS Arena
- Length: 5.2 miles (8.4 km) (Q1); 9.6 miles (15.4 km) (Q36); 6.6 miles (10.6 km) (Q43); 4.8 miles (7.7 km) (Q82)
- Other routes: n22 (Jamaica−Hicksville) n22X (Jamaica−Roosevelt Field Express)

Service
- Operates: 24 hours (Q1 & Q43); All times except late nights (Q36 & Q82)
- Ridership: Q1: 1,119,034 (2025); Q36: 988,767 (2025); Q43: 2,614,492 (2025); Q82: 222,846 (2025)
- Transfers: Yes
- Timetable: Q1 Q36 Q43 Q82

The Q1, Q36, Q43 and Q82 bus routes constitute a public transit line in Queens, New York City. The routes run primarily along Hillside Avenue from the Jamaica, Queens commercial and transportation hub towards several eastern Queens neighborhoods on the city border with Nassau County. Originally operated by the North Shore Bus Company until 1947, all four routes are now operated by MTA Regional Bus Operations under the New York City Transit brand.

== Route description and service ==
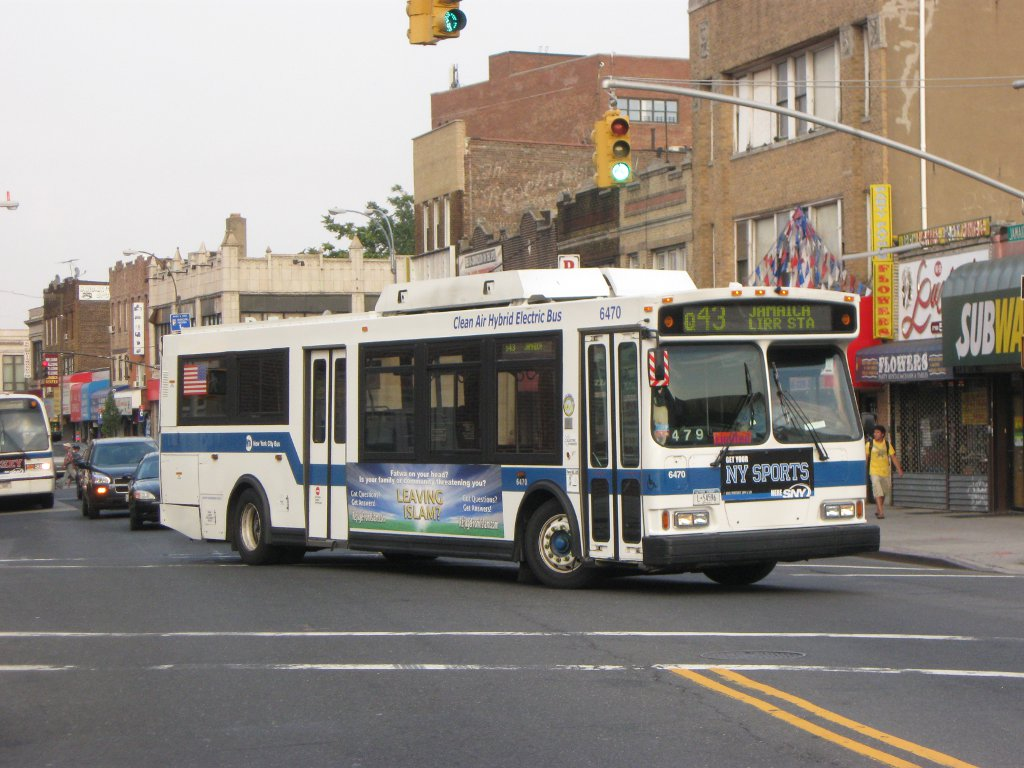
A 2004 Orion VII OG HEV (6470) on the westbound Q43 to Jamaica LIRR Station turning onto Sutphin Boulevard in Jamaica.

The Q1, Q36, Q43 and Q82 are the primary bus services along Hillside Avenue, sharing the corridor between Merrick Boulevard (near the 165th Street Bus Terminal) and 212th Street. Several other routes provide service along the corridor east of the bus terminal before diverging north or south to other streets. The Q36 and Q43 provide limited-stop service west of Springfield Boulevard, while the Q82 provides limited-stop service west of 212th Street. Local service is provided by the Q1 and other routes. The corridor also parallels the short eastern portion of the New York City Subway's IND Queens Boulevard Line along Hillside Avenue, and transfers to the F and <F> train are available at Parsons Boulevard, 169th Street, and Jamaica–179th Street.

=== Q1 ===
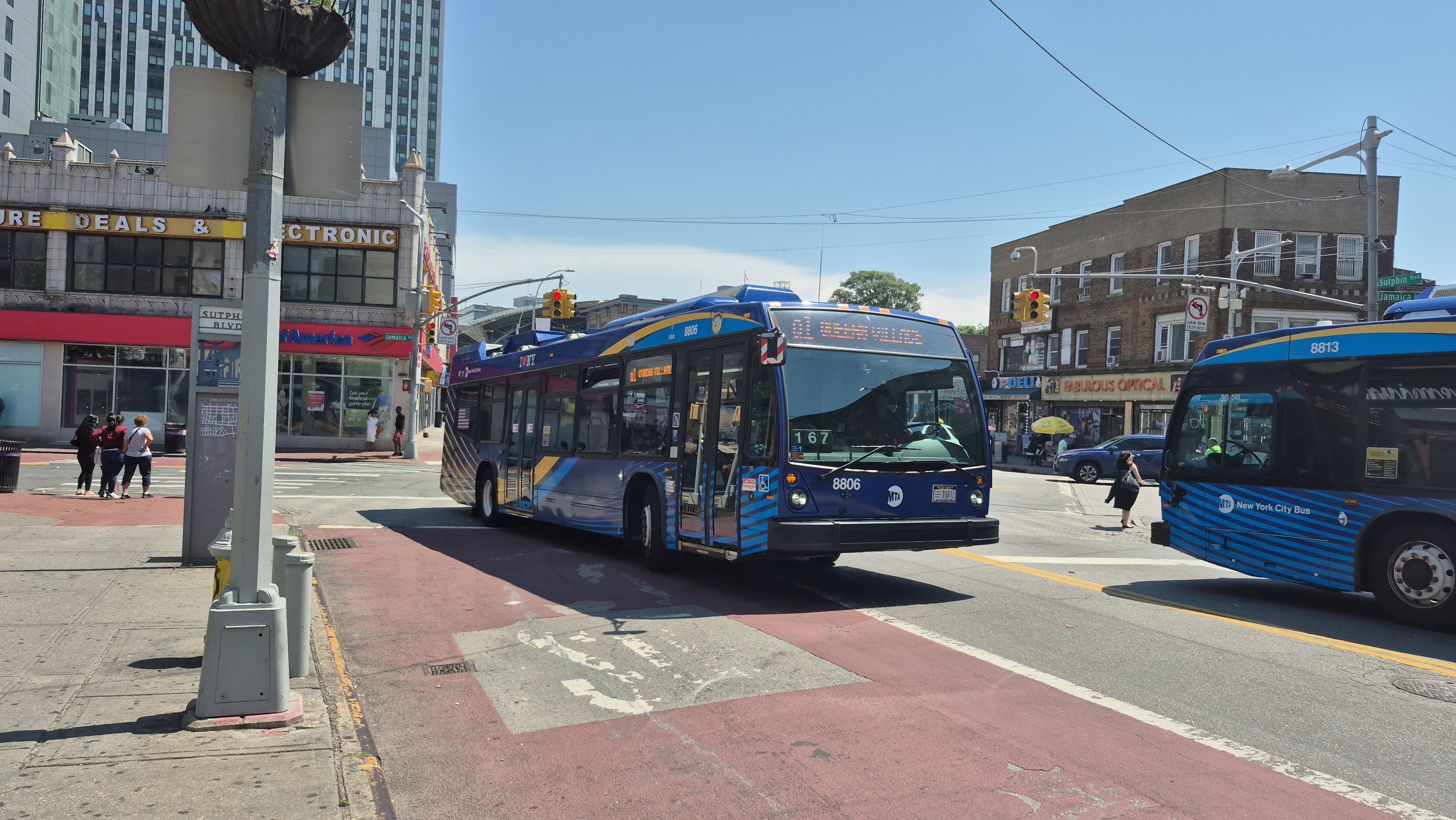
2021 Nova LFS 8806 on the Q1 at Jamaica LIRR station

The Q1 begins at Jamaica Avenue and Sutphin Boulevard, one block away from Sutphin Boulevard–Archer Avenue–JFK Airport subway station and the Jamaica station for the Long Island Rail Road and AirTrain JFK. It runs north along Sutphin Boulevard to Hillside Avenue, then proceeds east along Hillside Avenue. At adjacent intersections with Springfield Boulevard and Braddock Avenue, the Q1 runs southeast along Braddock Avenue, terminating at 243rd Street and the Cross Island Parkway in Bellerose. Immediately south and east, Braddock Avenue merges into Jamaica Avenue/Jericho Turnpike along the border with the Nassau County village of Bellerose. During the day, alternate eastbound buses terminate at Springfield Boulevard.

=== Q36 ===
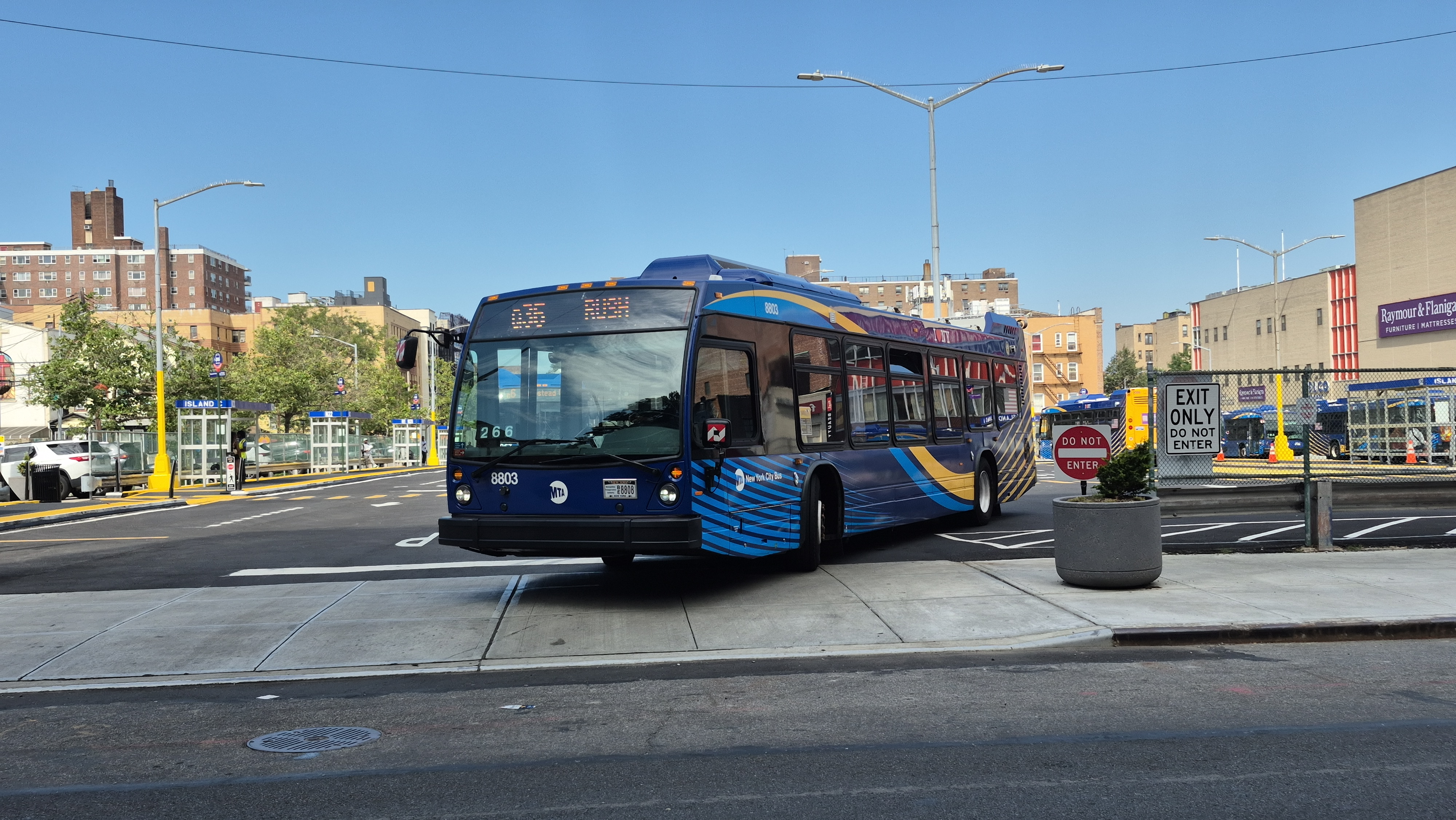
2021 Nova LFS 8803 on the Q36 Rush at Jamaica Bus Terminal

The Q36 begins at the 168th Street Bus Terminal, turns north on 168th Street and proceeds east along Hillside Avenue to Springfield Boulevard, turns south, then follows Jamaica Avenue (later continuous with Jericho Turnpike) east along the Queens-Nassau County border. The Q36 then turns north onto Little Neck Parkway and runs nearly the entire length of the street, terminating at the LIRR's Little Neck station at the northern end of Queens. During rush hours, select buses to/from Little Neck originate or terminate at 222nd Street, with all buses originating before 5:30am weekdays and 6:55am weekends, and terminating after 8:45pm every day. Prior to June 2010, the Little Neck Parkway segment was the separate Q79 route; the Q79's southern terminus, shared with the Q36's eastern terminus, was located at 257th Street and Jericho Turnpike. (Note: For historic Queens bus maps showing the Q79, see:)

=== Q43 ===
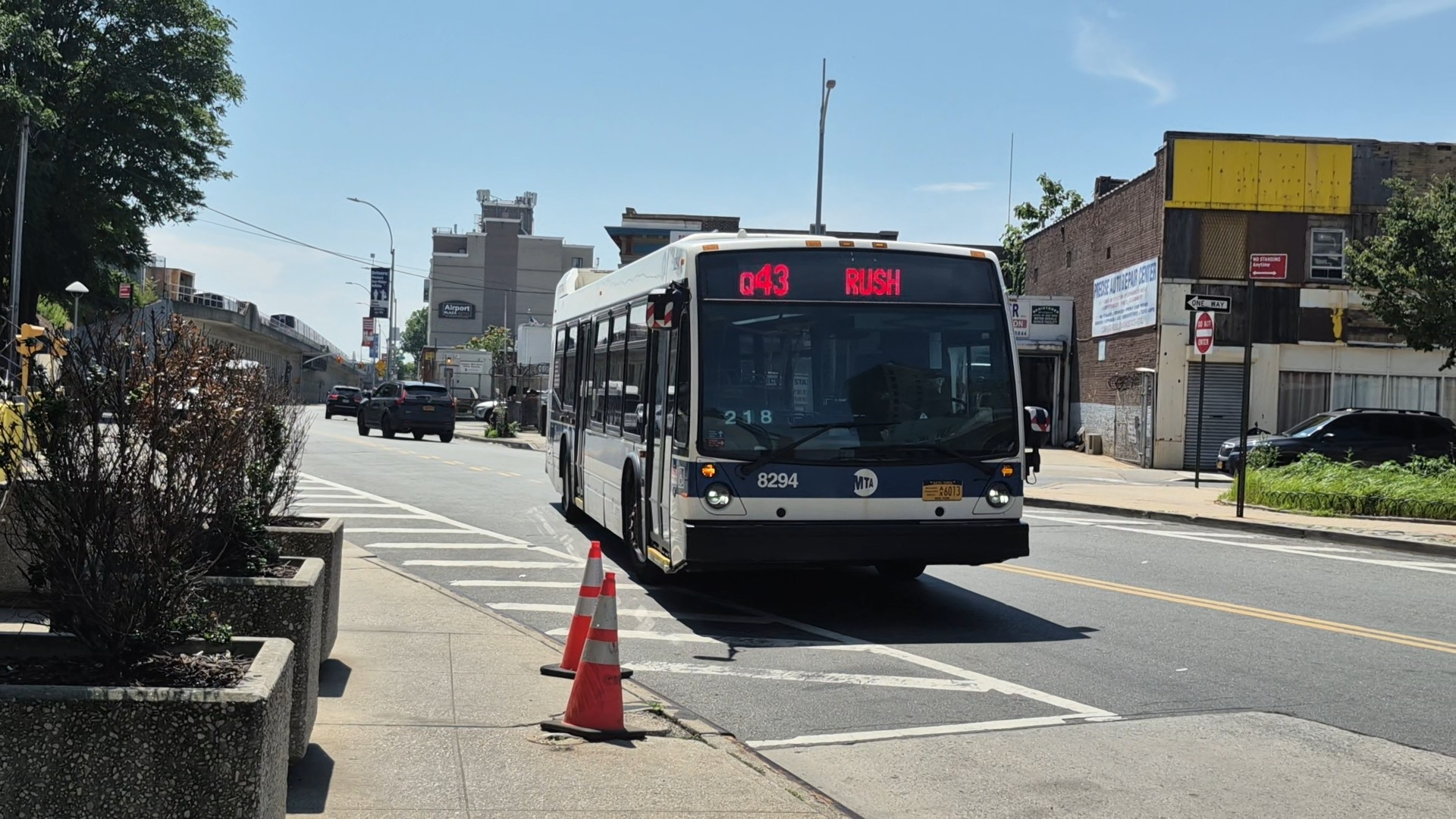
2016 Nova LFS #8294 on the Q43 Rush

The Q43 runs along nearly the entire length of Hillside Avenue, making limited stops west of Springfield Boulevard. It begins at Archer Avenue and Sutphin Boulevard. The bus route travels north along Sutphin Boulevard, then east along Hillside Avenue to 268th Street in Floral Park, Queens, at the border with North New Hyde Park in Nassau County. Q43 buses make all stops between Springfield Boulevard and 268th Street.

When school is in session, one trip to Jamaica departs at 2:27 from Irwin Altman Middle School 172 at 257th Street/81st Avenue. This trip heads to Hillside Avenue via 82nd Avenue and Little Neck Parkway. Another trip to Jamaica departs at 2:35pm from Commonwealth Boulevard on Union Turnpike near a school complex. This trip heads to Hillside Avenue via Union Turnpike and 243rd Street.

Several other buses to Jamaica originate at 231st Street where Martin Van Buren High School is located. One trip departs at 1:37pm, followed by seven more between 2:26 and 2:36pm. Three extra buses also run the full route to Jamaica from Floral Park from 2:25-2:31pm. All school trippers make the same “rush” stops as regular service.

=== Q82 ===
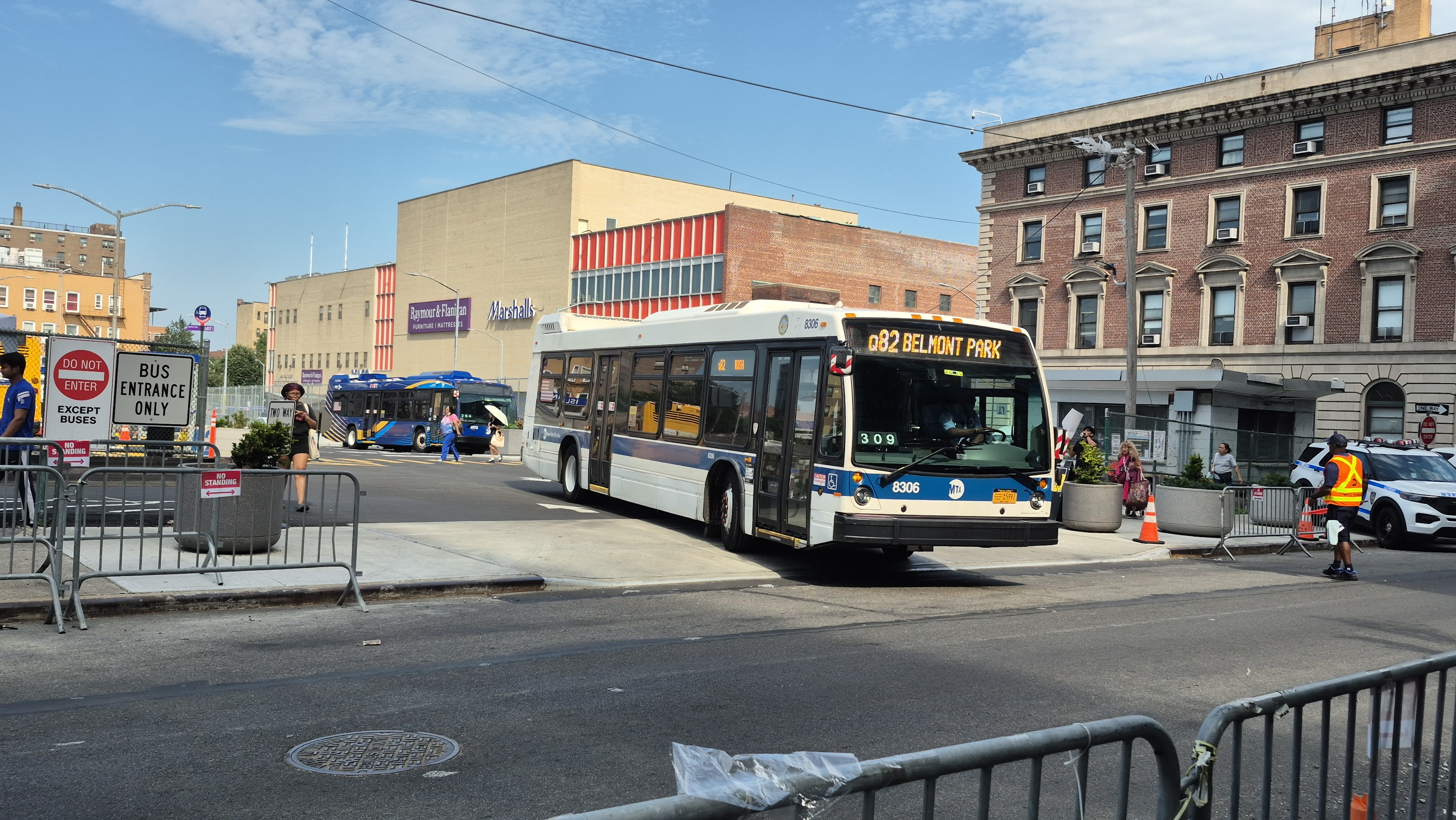
2016 Nova LFS 8306 on the Q82 at Jamaica Bus Terminal

The Q82 begins at the 168th Street Bus Terminal, turns north on 168th Street and proceeds east along Hillside Avenue. At 212th Street, the route turns south taking over operations from the Q36. The route then turns east on Jamaica Avenue and then south along Hempstead Avenue where it continues until terminating at the UBS Arena.

When school is in session, one trip to Jamaica departs at 2:30pm from Jean Nuzzi Intermediate School, located at 213th Street/92nd Avenue. It heads to 212th Street via 92nd Avenue and makes the same “rush” stops as regular service. This service was formally provided by the Q36 until its reroute to Springfield Boulevard.

=== Other local bus service ===
Hillside Avenue is also served by the following:

- All buses that terminate at the 168th Street Bus Terminal use 169th Street to enter, and 168th Street to exit.
  - The Q2 and Q3 buses run between the bus terminal and either 188th Street (Jamaica), or 187th Place (opposite terminals: Belmont Park and JFK Airport, respectively).
  - The Q76 and Q77 buses run between the terminal and Francis Lewis Boulevard. The Q77 heads south on Francis Lewis to serve Springfield Gardens, while the Q76 heads north for Bayside, Whitestone, and College Point.
- The Q17 runs between 188th Street to serve Fresh Meadows and Flushing, and either 168th Street (Flushing), or Merrick Boulevard (Jamaica).
- The Q44 SBS runs on the corridor between Queens Boulevard and Sutphin Boulevard.
- The Q65 runs between Parsons Boulevard and 164th Street.
- From 153rd Street, the Q111, Q113, Q114, and Q115 buses head east on Hillside to complete their Parsons Boulevard station trips, then south on Parsons Boulevard to their opposite terminals. On the other hand, Cambria Heights-bound Q83 buses, which terminate at 153rd Street, head west to 150th Street.
- The Q30, Q31 and Q75 run from 169th Street to Merrick Boulevard (Jamaica) and from 168th Street to Homelawn Street (opposite terminals).
- College Point-bound Q20 and Midtown East-bound Q60 buses use a tiny portion to switch over to the north lanes of Queens Boulevard.
- Westbound Q54 buses run from 131st Street to Metropolitan Avenue.
- Q40 buses use the avenue to deadhead west from 148th Street to Sutphin Boulevard, before heading to South Jamaica.

=== Express bus service ===
Express service along the corridor is provided by the QM68, which makes stops along the corridor between Queens Boulevard and 268th Street in the peak direction. The QM68 runs to and from Midtown Manhattan.

=== Nassau Inter-County Express service ===
There are several bus routes operated by Nassau Inter-County Express that also run along the Hillside Avenue corridor. Within New York City limits, NICE bus routes only drop off passengers in the westbound direction (toward Jamaica) and pick up passengers in the eastbound direction (toward Nassau County). The entirety of Hillside Avenue is served by the n22 and n26. East of city limits, the n22 continues east to Mineola, Roosevelt Field, and Hicksville, while the n26 travels north to Great Neck. In addition, the n6 and n24 and rush-hour n1 service runs on Hillside Avenue between Jamaica and Francis Lewis Boulevard. All three routes turn south at Francis Lewis Boulevard, then east on Jamaica Avenue. The n1 travels south to Hewlett; the n6 travels east to Hempstead Transit Center in Hempstead, New York, via Hempstead Turnpike; and the n24 travels east to Roosevelt Field via Jericho Turnpike.

== History ==
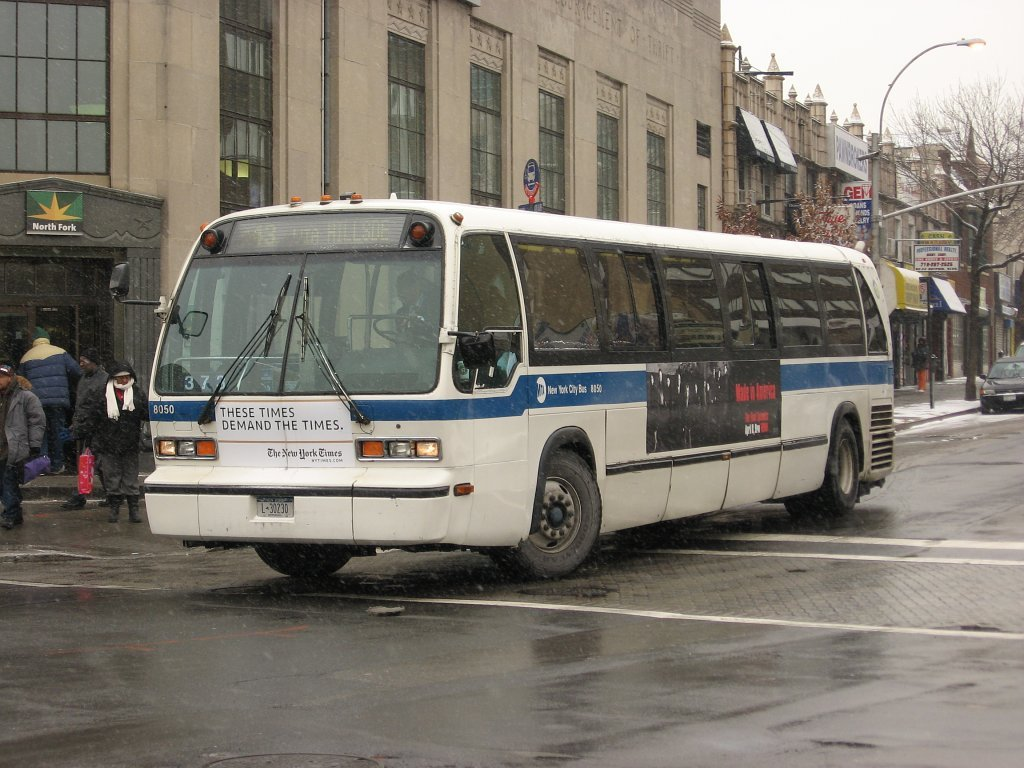
A 1990 TMC RTS-06 (8050) on the Q43.

=== Early history ===
Service on the Q1, which was originally operated by Hillside Transportation Company, first operated in 1914. Service on this route began between Guilford Street station and Hollis via Hillside Avenue. The Q1 was later operated by Nevin-Queens Bus Corporation until February 17, 1935, when its operations were transferred to the North Shore Bus Company. North Shore operated the Q1 until November 1936. Z&M Coach Company then operated the route until June 30, 1939, upon which the North Shore Bus Company operated the Q1 again.

Service on the Q36 bus began in April 1926, being operated by Schenck Transportation. The Q36 was also operated by North Shore Bus Company at some point in the 1930s, though it is unclear if Z&M Coach also operated the route. Service on the Q43 began on May 24, 1935; it was also operated by Schenck Transportation.

=== World War II ===
On May 12, 1941, the North Shore Bus Company modified several of its bus routes in Downtown Jamaica at the request of the New York City Police Department to reduce traffic congestion between 166th Street and 170th Street, and at the 169th Street subway station. As part of the changes, the Q43 began running overnight, and the western terminals of the Q1 and Q43 were swapped. The Q1 was truncated from the Long Island Rail Road's Jamaica station to the 165th Street Bus Terminal, while the Q43 was extended from the bus terminal to Jamaica station. This change was strongly opposed by Q43 riders as buses that left the Jamaica LIRR station at Archer Avenue and Parsons Boulevard were regularly filled to capacity by the time they arrived at the 169th Street station on Hillside Avenue several blocks north. Before the change, the buses had been nearly empty before reaching the station. In the following days, service was gradually increased by 25%, from 62 to 77 buses, but this was insufficient to accommodate all of the ridership.

As a result of wartime shortage during World War II, North Shore was directed to reduce its rush-hour milage by 20%. On May 29, 1943, the company cut 67 rush hour trips on its Jamaica routes, reduced frequencies during other times, and entirely discontinued some routes. As part of the changes, the Queens Village branch of the Q1 was made to operate during rush hours only. Service on the Bellerose branch was decreased from 24 to 20 trips during morning rush hours, from 24 to 17 during evening rush hours, and from 6 to 3 during other times. On the Q43, morning rush hour service was cut from 16 to 11 buses, and evening rush hour service was cut from 12 to 10 buses. Q36 service was largely unchanged during middays, reduced by four buses in the morning, and reduced by one bus in the evening.

The decline in North Shore's service prompted an investigation by the Long Island Star-Journal, a local publication. In 1946, following the end of the war, North Shore ordered 50 additional buses for all of its routes, though only ten had been delivered by February 1947.

=== City operation ===
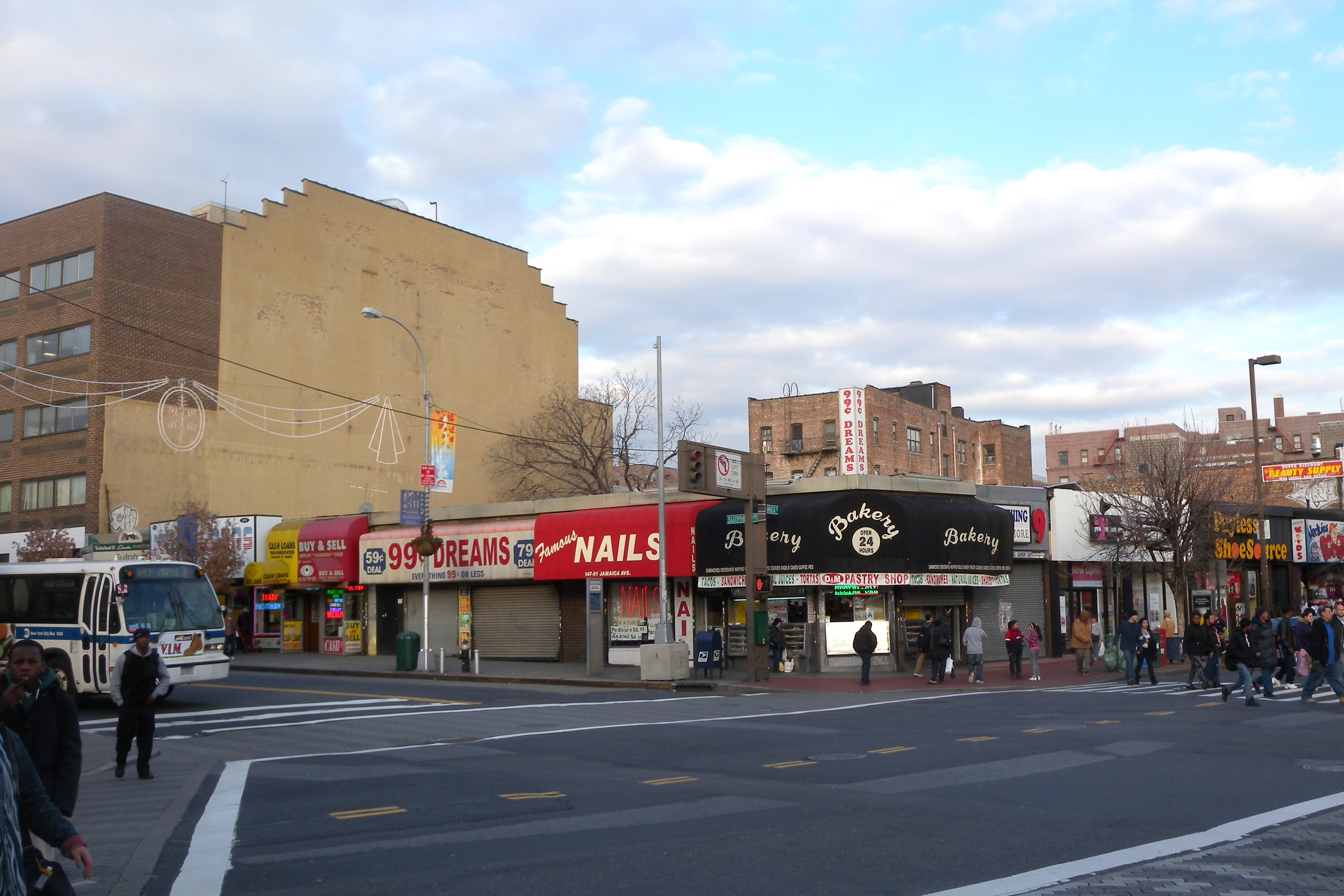
A 1998 Nova Bus RTS-06 (9529) on the Jamaica-bound Q43 at Jamaica Avenue/Sutphin Boulevard

On March 30, 1947, North Shore Bus was taken over by the Board of Transportation (later the New York City Transit Authority), making the bus routes city operated. The city immediately added 120 new vehicles to ten bus routes, including the Hillside bus routes. Under municipal operations, service on the Q43 was increased on April 3 of that year.

On June 28, 1954, express service on the Q43 began, with expresses leaving the City Line between 7 a.m. and 8:12 a.m. and leaving from the 179th Street subway station between 5:30 p.m. and 6:28 p.m. at 8-minute intervals. These buses ran in the peak direction and were expected to save 2 to 3 minutes.

Express bus service began along the corridor on August 2, 1971, as the Q18X, as the first New York City Transit express service between Queens and Manhattan. The route was renumbered the X18 in 1976, before being renumbered to its current designation, the X68, on April 15, 1990.

In January 1993, peak-direction limited-stop service replaced peak-direction local service on the Q43. These buses began to make limited stops between 179th Street and Springfield Boulevard. The suggestion for this service originated from the Bellerose Commonwealth Civic Association in 1991. On April 7, 2008, limited-stop service on the Q36 was introduced, saving up to 5 minutes per trip. Q36 buses began to make limited stops between the 179th Street subway station and 212th Street, where that bus diverges from Hillside Avenue.

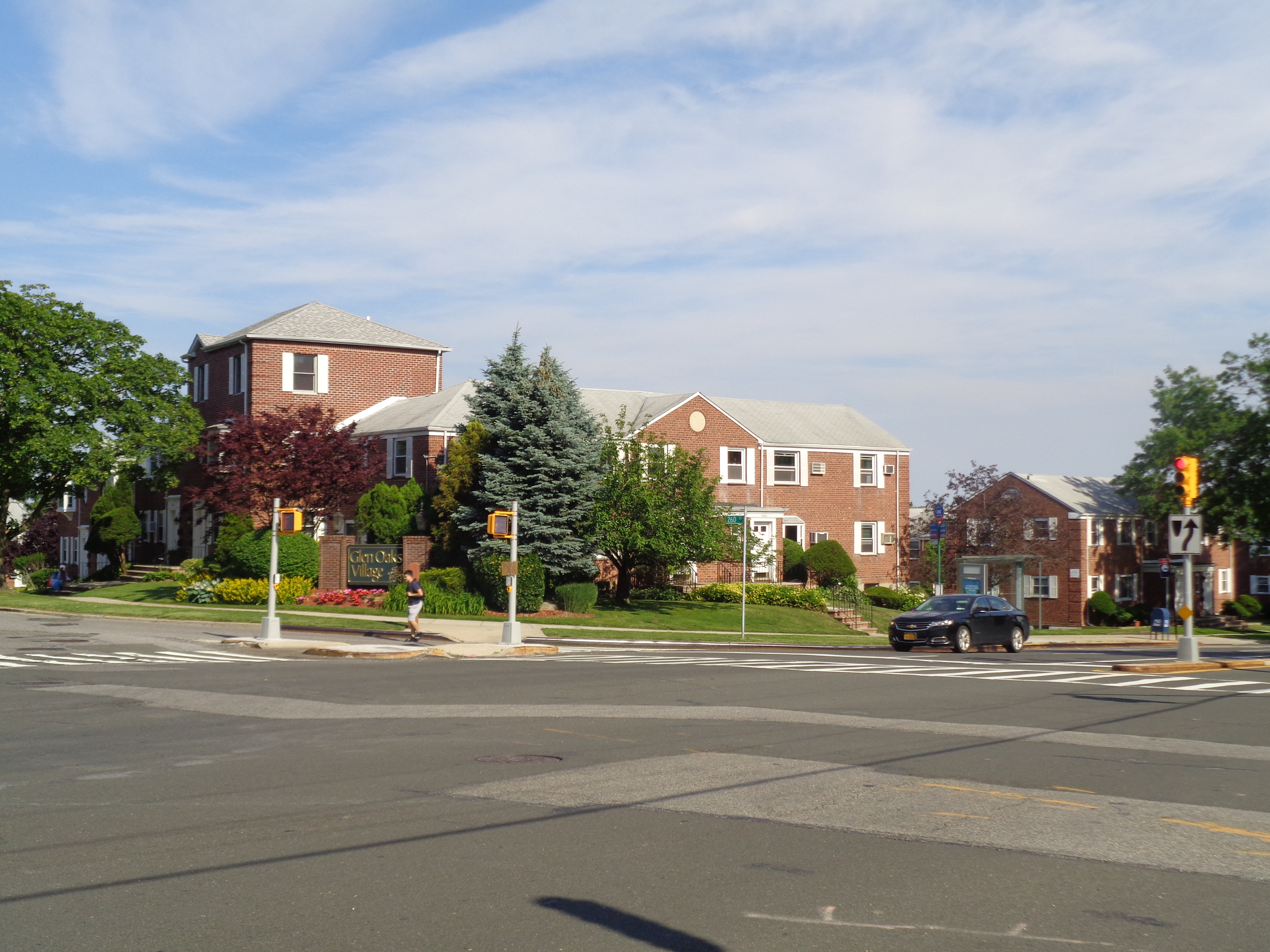
A Q36 Little Neck/Q46 Kew Gardens bus stop at the Glen Oaks Village development, at Little Neck Parkway/260th Street.

On January 7, 2013, alternate weekday Q36 buses started running along Little Neck Parkway, instead of running to the route's normal terminal at 257th Street and Jericho Turnpike, using the alignment of the former Q79 route that had been eliminated on June 27, 2010. This change was made as part of the MTA's Service Enhancement Plan, which was released in July 2012, and was intended to restore network coverage. The extension also gave the Little Neck Parkway corridor a one-seat ride to the subway at the Jamaica–179th Street station on Hillside Avenue. Q36 buses to the LIRR station in Little Neck were scheduled every 30 minutes, as opposed to connecting with every LIRR train due to the LIRR's erratic schedule, as well as to ensure reliability along the bus route.

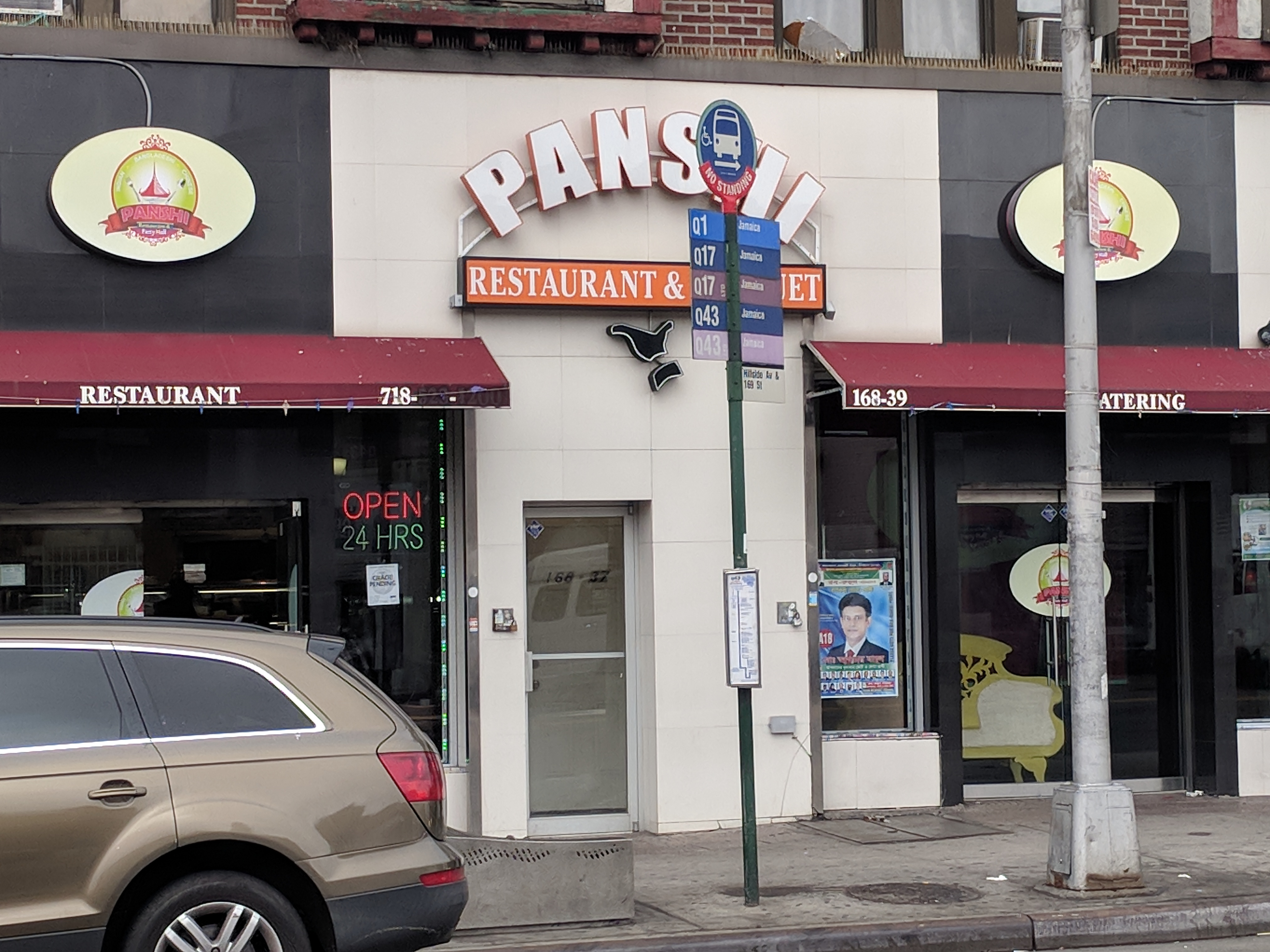
A Q1/Q43 Jamaica bus stop at Hillside Avenue/169th Street (Panshii Restaurant) in October 2018, alongside the Q17

==== Bus redesign ====
In December 2019, the MTA released a draft redesign of the Queens bus network. As part of the redesign, the Hillside Avenue buses would have contained one high-density "intra-borough" route, the QT18. There would have been several "subway connector" routes with nonstop sections on Hillside Avenue. These included the QT34 to Manhasset; the QT36 to Lake Success; the QT38 to Queens Village; and the QT39 to Cambria Heights. The redesign was delayed due to the COVID-19 pandemic in New York City in 2020, and the original draft plan was dropped due to negative feedback.

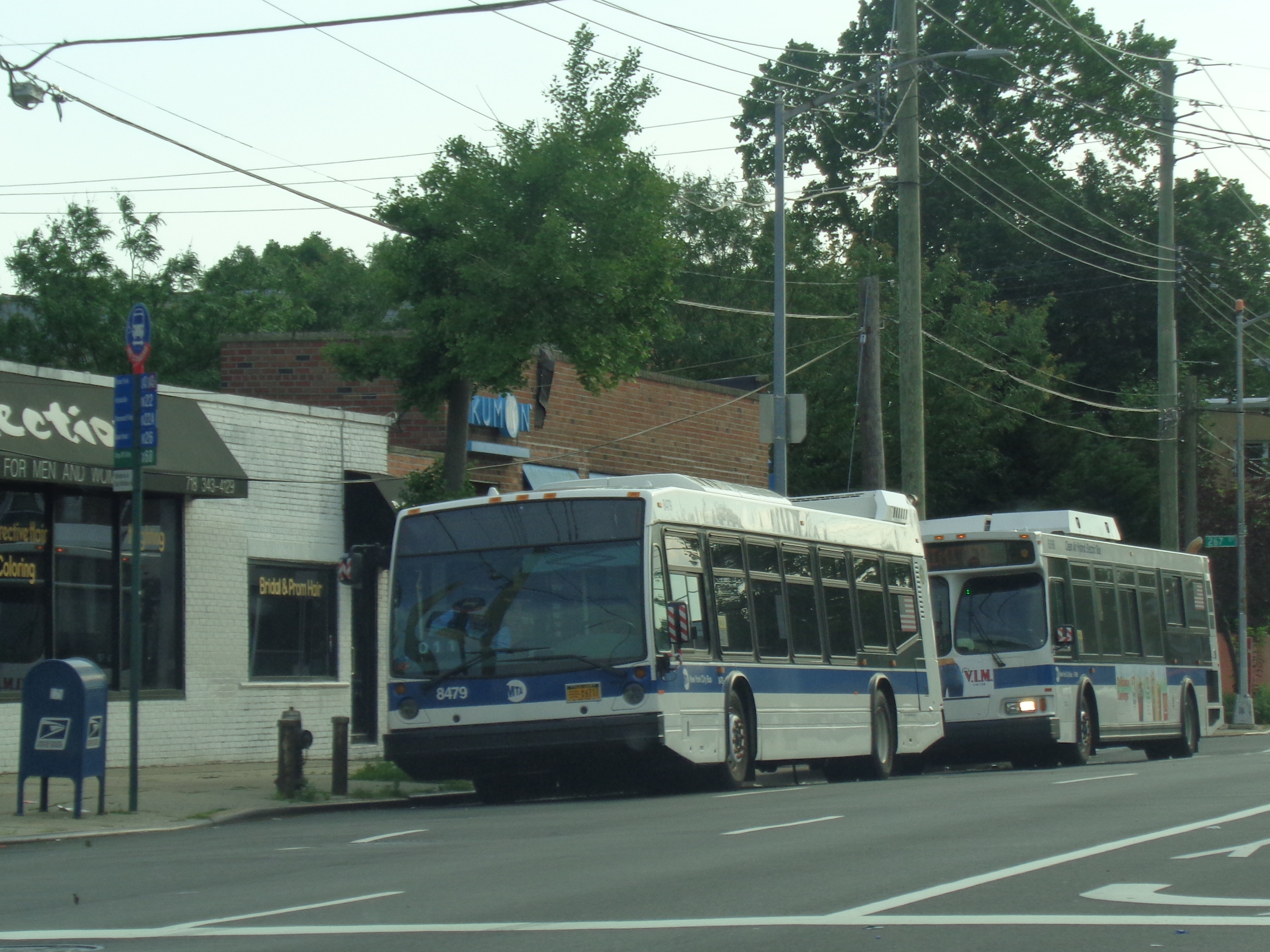
An Orion VII OG HEV on the Q43 Limited and a 2016 Nova Bus LFS (8479) at the route’s eastern terminus: 268th Street in Floral Park.

A revised plan was released in March 2022. As part of the new plan, the Q1 would become a "limited-stop" route and extended west and south to Sutphin Boulevard, replacing the Q6 to John F. Kennedy International Airport. The Q43 would become a "zone" route with nonstop sections on Hillside Avenue. The Q36 would be eliminated and replaced with a "zone" route, the Q45, which would run on Hillside Avenue and Little Neck Parkway. In addition, a new Q82 route from 165th Street to UBS Arena would replace the Q36 along 211th Street and Hollis Court Boulevard, and a new Q57 route from the Rockaway Boulevard station to Little Neck Parkway would replace the Q36 along Jamaica Avenue.

A final bus-redesign plan was released in December 2023. The Q1 would still become a limited route, and its Springfield Boulevard branch would still be eliminated, but the western part of the route would be extended only to Sutphin Boulevard and Archer Avenue, rather than down to JFK Airport. The Q36 would become a zone route and would maintain its existing routing to Little Neck Parkway, eliminating service to Floral Park, as well as weekend and overnight service. In Queens Village, the Q36 would use Springfield Boulevard, rather than 212th Street and 212th Place; the latter streets would be used by a new Q82 route to UBS Arena. The Q43 would become a zone route and would retain the same routing, although frequencies would be reduced.

On December 17, 2024, addendums to the final plan were released. Among these, some Q1 buses will only run between Jamaica and Hillside Avenue/Springfield Boulevard, weekend service was added to the Little Neck branch of the Q36, and stop changes were made to the Q43. The Q82, running to UBS Arena, was retained. On January 29, 2025, the current plan was approved by the MTA Board, and the Q1 was later reverted back to a “Local” route due to stop spacing. The Queens Bus Redesign went into effect in two different phases during Summer 2025, and all four routes are part of Phase I, which started on June 29, 2025. As of this date, the Q43 extension to Long Island Jewish Hospital is still being considered for a separate implementation.
