= Bellerose, Queens =

Neighborhood in New York City

Bellerose
- Neighborhood of Queens
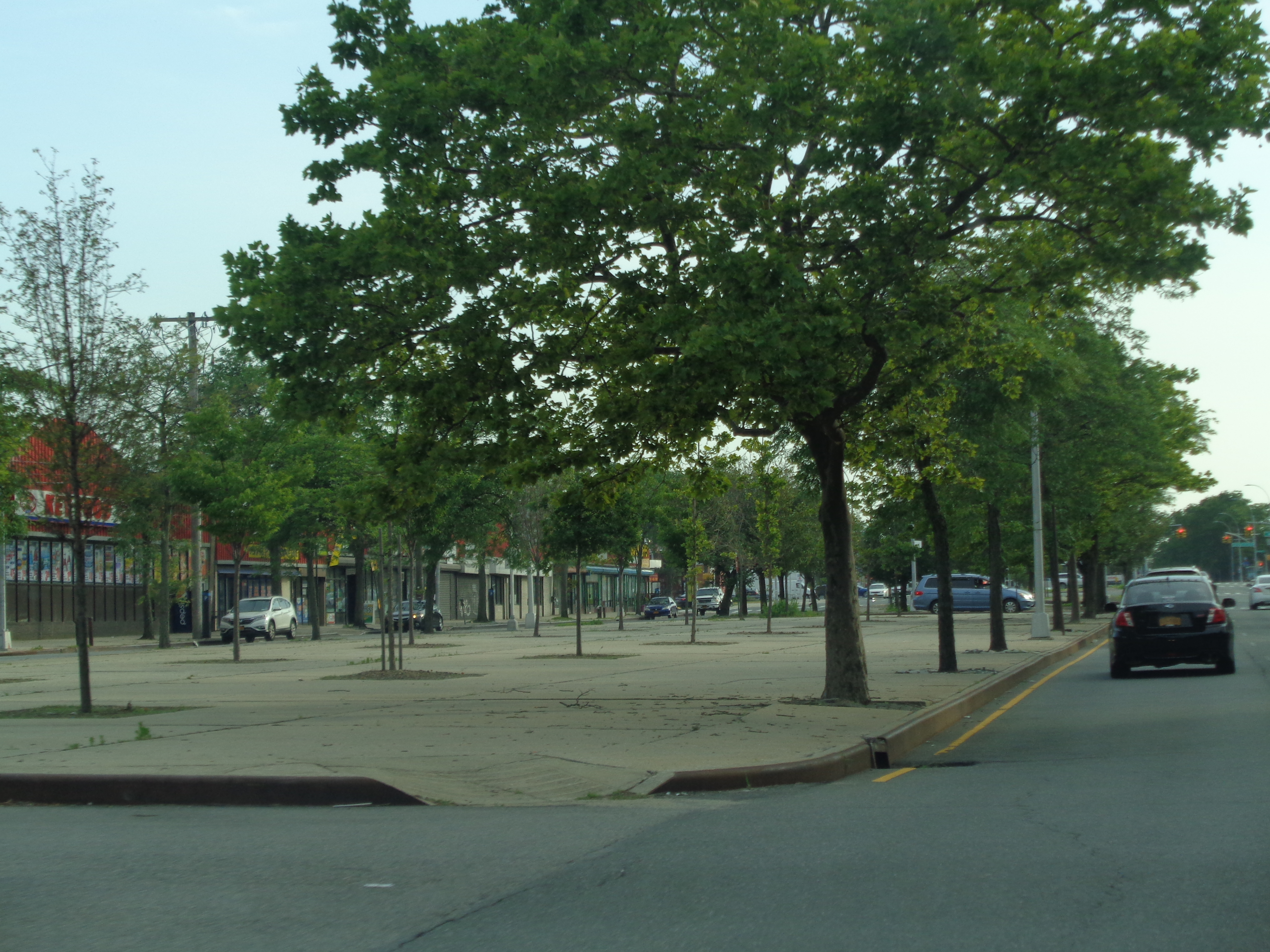
- Wide, tree-lined median on Hillside Avenue
- Interactive map of Bellerose
- Country: United States
- State: New York
- City: New York City
- County/Borough: Queens
- Community District: Queens 13
- Time zone: UTC−5 (EST)
  - Summer (DST): UTC−4 (EDT)
- ZIP Code: 11426, 11427
- Area codes: 718, 347, 929, and 917

Bellerose is an ethnically diverse, middle-class neighborhood on the eastern edge of the New York City borough of Queens, along the border of Queens and Nassau County, Long Island. It is adjacent to Bellerose Village and Bellerose Terrace in Nassau County, from which it is separated by Jericho Turnpike. The northern edge of Bellerose is separated from another part of the Nassau border by the neighborhood of Floral Park, Queens to the east, divided by Little Neck Parkway.

The neighborhood consists predominantly of detached houses with mostly middle-class Indian American and European American populations. While the northeastern section of Queens Village is sometimes referred to as part of Bellerose, it is also called Bellerose Manor, which is recognized by the U.S. Postal Service as an "acceptable alternate" to Queens Village and Jamaica in postal addresses using the zip code 11427.

Bellerose is located in Queens Community District 13 and its ZIP Code is 11426. It is patrolled by the New York City Police Department's 105th Precinct.

== Demographics ==
Bellerose, which is stipulated as Neighborhood Tabulation Area QN1302 by the New York City Department of City Planning, had 26,566 inhabitants based on data from the 2020 United States Census and Covering an area of 1,258.85 acres (509.44 ha). This was an increase of 1,279 persons (5.05%) from the 25,287 counted in 2010. The neighborhood had a population density of 21.0 inhabitants per acre (14,500/sq mi; 5,600/km^{2}).

The racial makeup of the neighborhood was 20.4% (5,430) White (Non-Hispanic), 8.1% (2,144) Black (Non-Hispanic), 48.7% (12,942) Asian, 3.1% (824) from other races, and 3.1% (820) from two or more races. Hispanic or Latino of any race were 16.6% (4,406) of the population.

According to the 2020 United States Census, Bellerose has many cultural communities of over 1,000 inhabitants. This include residents who identify as Irish, Italian, Chinese, Indian, Pakistani, and Filipino. 56.5% of the residents in Bellerose were foreign born.

Most inhabitants are middle-aged adults: 19.7% are between the ages of between 0–19, 26.8% between 20-39, 27.3% between 40-59, and 26.2 older than 60. 65.3% of the households had at least one family present.

== Education ==
Bellerose's public schools are operated by the New York City Department of Education. It is mostly part of District 26 but some areas are in District 29. The neighborhood's nearest high school is Martin Van Buren High School in Queens Village.

The Queens Public Library operates the Bellerose branch at 250-06 Hillside Avenue.

== Transportation ==
The New York City Bus system serves Bellerose on the Q43 and QM68 on Hillside Avenue. Buses on Union Turnpike include the Q46, Q48, QM6 and QM36. The Q36 bus on Jamaica Avenue. The Q1 bus on Braddock Avenue. It is also served by Nassau Inter-County Express on the n22, n24 and n26. Hillside Avenue, Jamaica Avenue, and Union Turnpike are the major east–west arteries. The Cross Island Parkway serves as the major north–south artery.

The closest railroad stations are the Bellerose station and the Elmont station, located outside the city limits on the Hempstead Branch of the Long Island Rail Road.

== Notable people ==
- Ted Alexandro (born 1969), stand-up comedian.
- Heems (born 1985), rapper
- Mitch Horowitz (born 1965), writer in occult and esoteric themes
- Frank Padavan (1934–2018), engineer and politician, who served as a New York state senator representing District 11
- Jack Rohan (1931–2004), college basketball player and coach, who was head coach of the Columbia Lions men's basketball team.
- Lynne Stewart (1939–2017), defense attorney who was known for representing controversial defendants.
- Shannon Tavarez (1999–2010), Broadway actress; advocate for bone-marrow donation.
