= Douglaston Manor Windmill =

Dutch windmill built in Littleneck, New York

Coordinates: 40°45′43.5″N 73°45′14″W

Douglaston Manor Windmill (c.1870s-1988) was a Dutch windmill built in Little Neck, New York to pump water for farming. Alley Pond Park has a standing windmill (built 2005) that is a replica of the Douglaston Manor windmill. The windmill's tower was relocated to Alley Pond Park after being threatened with demolition in November 1986, having been originally situated on Arleigh Road in Douglaston. A committee formed to save the windmill raised US$50,000 to relocate the structure.

== History ==
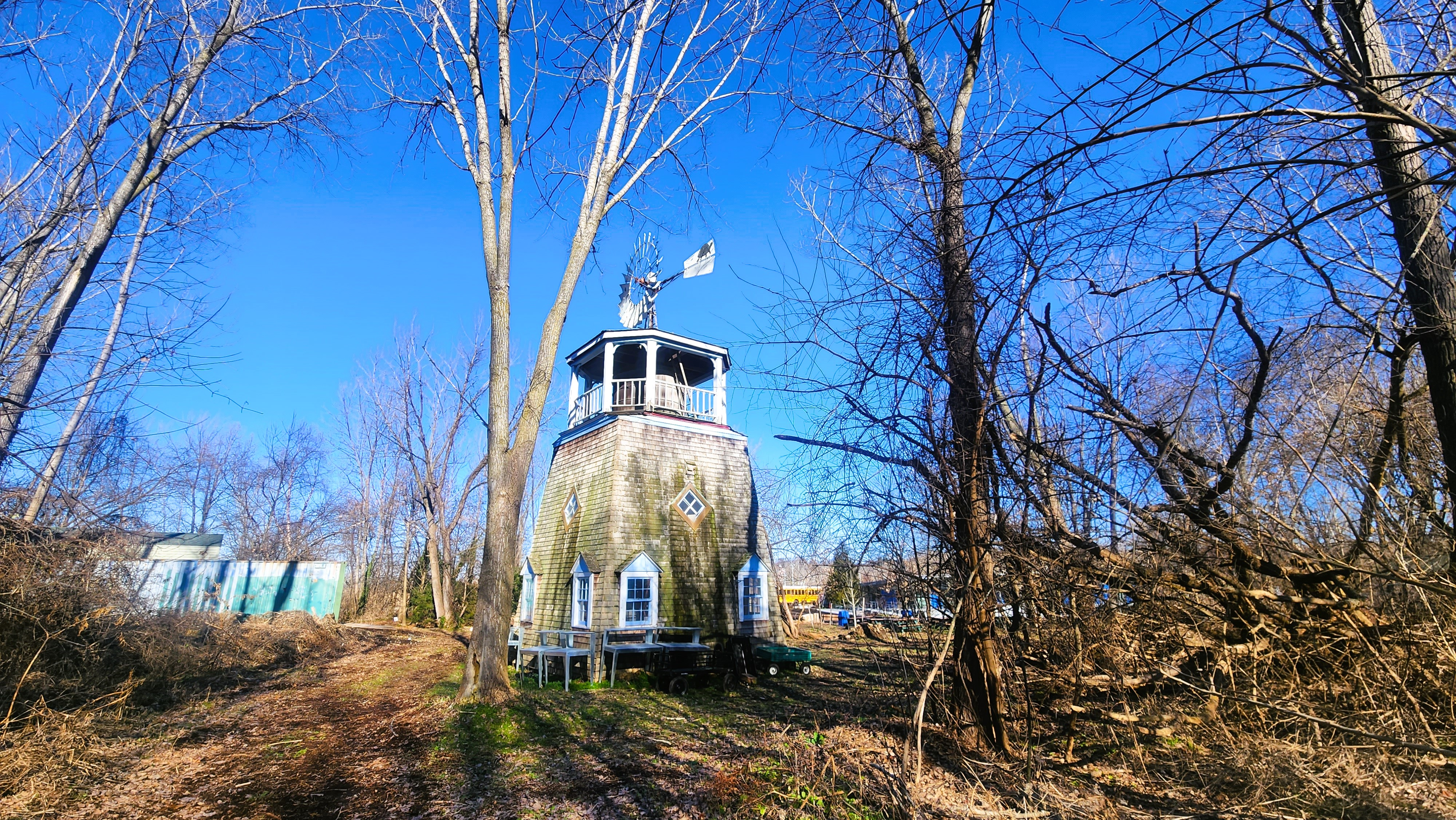
Douglaston Manor Windmill Replica Alley Pond Park; January 8, 2024.

The Douglaston peninsula and its surrounding land were originally inhabited by the Matinecoc Indians. Later, in the late 1600s, it was settled by both the English and the Dutch. This area is notable for once being home to the largest tree on Long Island, a magnificent 600-year-old White Oak with a remarkable 69" girth, located at 233 Arleigh Road. It was taken down in 2009. One of the few remaining 19th-century farmhouses in the city, the Benjamin Allen-Beville house, stands as a local landmark. This dwelling is 170 years old.

In 1819, Wyant Van Zandt arrived and established a large farm and manor house. Eventually, George Douglas, a wealthy Scot, acquired the Van Zandt manor house and approximately 120 acres of land in 1835. He adorned the area with the planting of exotic trees such as Gingko, copper beech, and weeping beach (though only one of these survives to this day). In 1876, Douglas' son, William, generously donated a station building to the Flushing and North Shore Railroad, which decided to name a new stop after him, thus giving rise to the name "Douglaston."

Thirty years later, William developed a private community known as Douglaston Manor, which now comprises 570 homes. In an effort to preserve the area's historic charm and beautiful old homes, the recently formed Douglaston Little Neck Historical Society is actively pursuing historic district designation for Douglas Manor and the adjacent Hill section. This designation would help protect and maintain the architectural and historical significance of 750 homes in these areas. Within the Manor, there exists a diverse assortment of homes that represent the various residential styles prevalent during the early 20th century. This collection includes examples of Tudor, Mediterranean, Colonial Revival, and Arts and Crafts.

== Home in a windmill ==
The Van Wyck family, who were of Dutch descent, held extensive land ownership in the region, making the mill house a relatively modest structure in comparison. Among their various buildings, a grand manor house dating back to 1735 still stands magnificently, along with a charming old farm house. The farm house served as a convenient location for the overseer to monitor the mill's operations. "The Douglaston mill stands out from the typical tall, octagonal curved windmills found in other parts of Long Island. Unlike its counterparts, this mill has a unique squat design with four sides, and its original round shingles have been covered with stucco over time. Unfortunately, it suffered significant damage during a severe hurricane in 1938, rendering its sails beyond repair. Now, empty black sprockets serve as a reminder of where the blades once fit." The mill had a dual purpose: serving as a water pump for land irrigation and potentially providing water supply to the manor house.

During the mid-19th century, the Douglas family acquired the land, thus bestowing the district with their name. Eventually, in 1906, the Douglases decided to sell the property to a real estate company. The mill underwent a transformation and was converted into a cozy two-room residence, where it peacefully existed for the following eight decades. Although its original identity as a windmill was mostly removed, it continued to provide a tranquil living space.

Originally a dilapidated tool shed, the mill was transformed when Mrs. Waldburger's husband purchased it in 1952. Mrs. Waldburger fondly recalled, "It was like my own doll's house. I renovated it with the intention of providing a private space for my married children to visit." In 1974, a young banker named Mr. Ostergren became the proud owner of the windmill. The previous owner had restored it, transforming the windmill into a charming guesthouse. To provide some extra space, a small two-story wing was added. Nestled 60ft deep in the woods on the Van Dyck farm, the windmill provides a sense of tranquility and seclusion. A cozy interior adorned with pine-panelled, stained wood canted walls, with gnarled chestnut and maple trees framing the diamond-shaped windows. As Mr. Ostergren aptly put it, "It's like discovering a little treehouse tucked away in the enchanting woods."

Upon the sale of the Arleigh Road property, the old mill faced the imminent threat of demolition. However, a dedicated committee rallied together to rescue and preserve it. In 1986, a successful effort was made to relocate the mill to Northern Boulevard, specifically to the Alley Pond Park Environmental Center The 1986 route west had telephone lines moved to accommodate the procession down Northern Blvd. As part of the process, a new foundation was constructed, and a well was drilled to ensure its stability and functionality.

In a regrettable February 23, 1988 incident, the windmill with a century-old history, which was undergoing restoration by the residents of Douglaston, Queens, suffered a devastating fire on the premises of the Alley Pond Park environmental center.

Despite the setback caused by the fire, Pat Juviler, the chairman of the committee responsible for preserving the windmill, expressed the community's unwavering commitment to continue the restoration project. Fortunately, insurance coverage would facilitate the rebuilding process, and a replica of the windmill now stands in the yard of the reconstructed Alley Pond Environmental Center. In 1972, an inspiring collaboration between nature-focused community members and the NYC Parks Department led to the establishment of APEC (Alley Pond Park Environmental Center) on the property. Led by activists Hy and Joan Rosner and other residents, support for a center grew, culminating in on-site outdoor classrooms, sustains an apiary and petting zoo, and hosts the Douglaston Windmill. This partnership gave birth to a vibrant hub dedicated to environmental education and appreciation.

== Present day ==
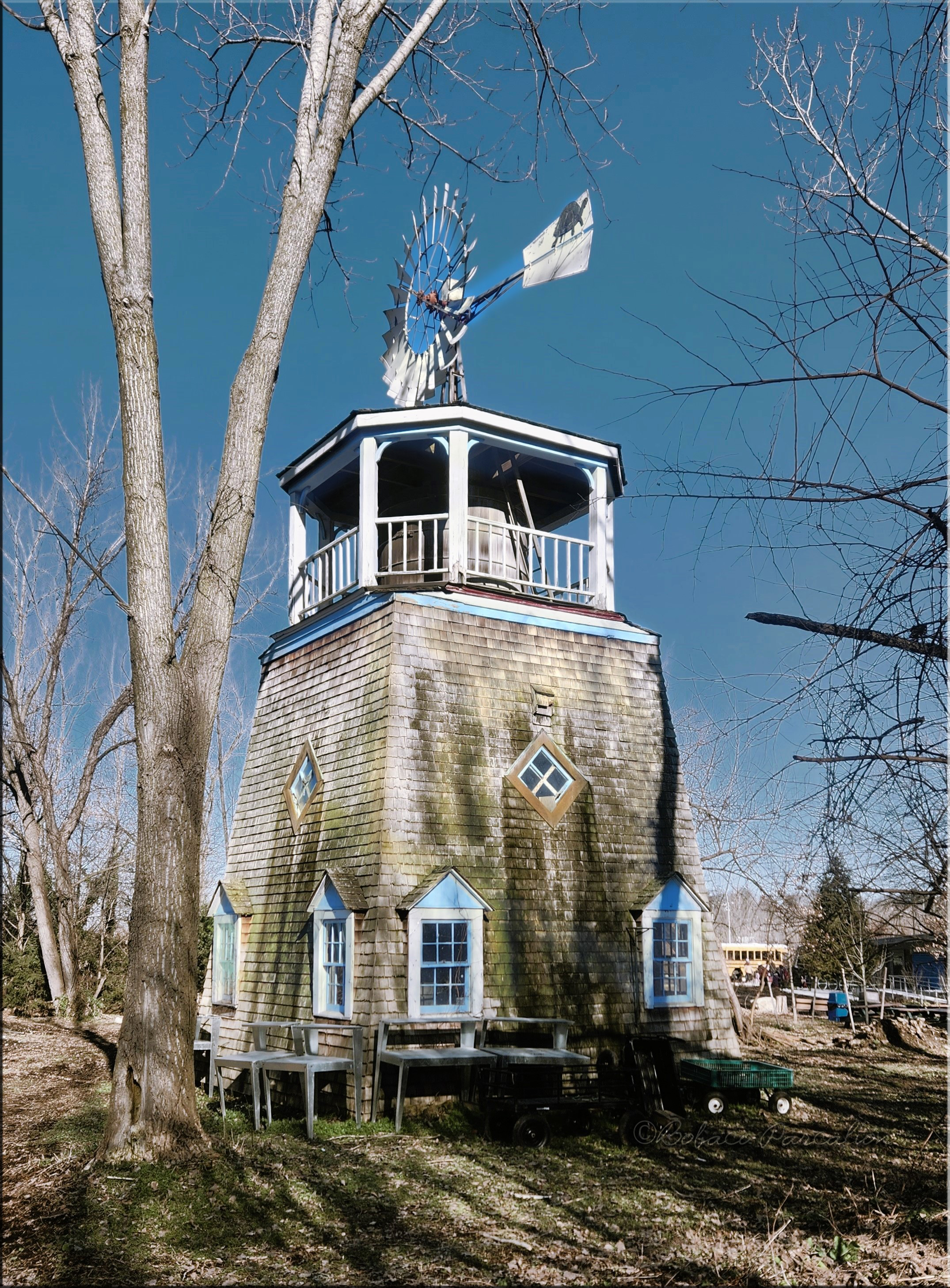
Alley Pond Windpump replica of the Douglaston Manor windmill

The windmill located at the Alley Pond Environmental Center in Douglaston, Queens, differs significantly from former mayor Bloomberg's ambitious plan to install turbines offshore, on bridges, and atop skyscrapers. Standing at a height of approximately 40 feet, it falls considerably shorter than most tenement buildings.

The primary purpose of this windmill is to draw water from a well that reaches a depth of 55 feet. The water is then pumped through a 300-foot-long pipe system, eventually reaching a picturesque irrigation pond surrounded by lush foliage. A recent visit showed the 10-foot-wide wheel, positioned atop a charming three-story wooden-shingled structure, spun leisurely in a gentle breeze. However, after a while, it emitted a creaking sound and came to a stop. One of two standing Aermotor windpumps in Queens, (The other is the Adriance Farm Windmill at the Queens Farm Museum), it is the only one with a dry 800 gallon holding tank and pumps water to a pond. The Alley pond Environmental center also provides learning space for schoolchildren and self guided nature tours of the Alley Pond Park.

== See also ==
- List of windmills in New York
