= Douglaston–Little Neck, Queens =

Neighborhood in New York City

Douglaston–Little Neck
- Neighborhood of Queens
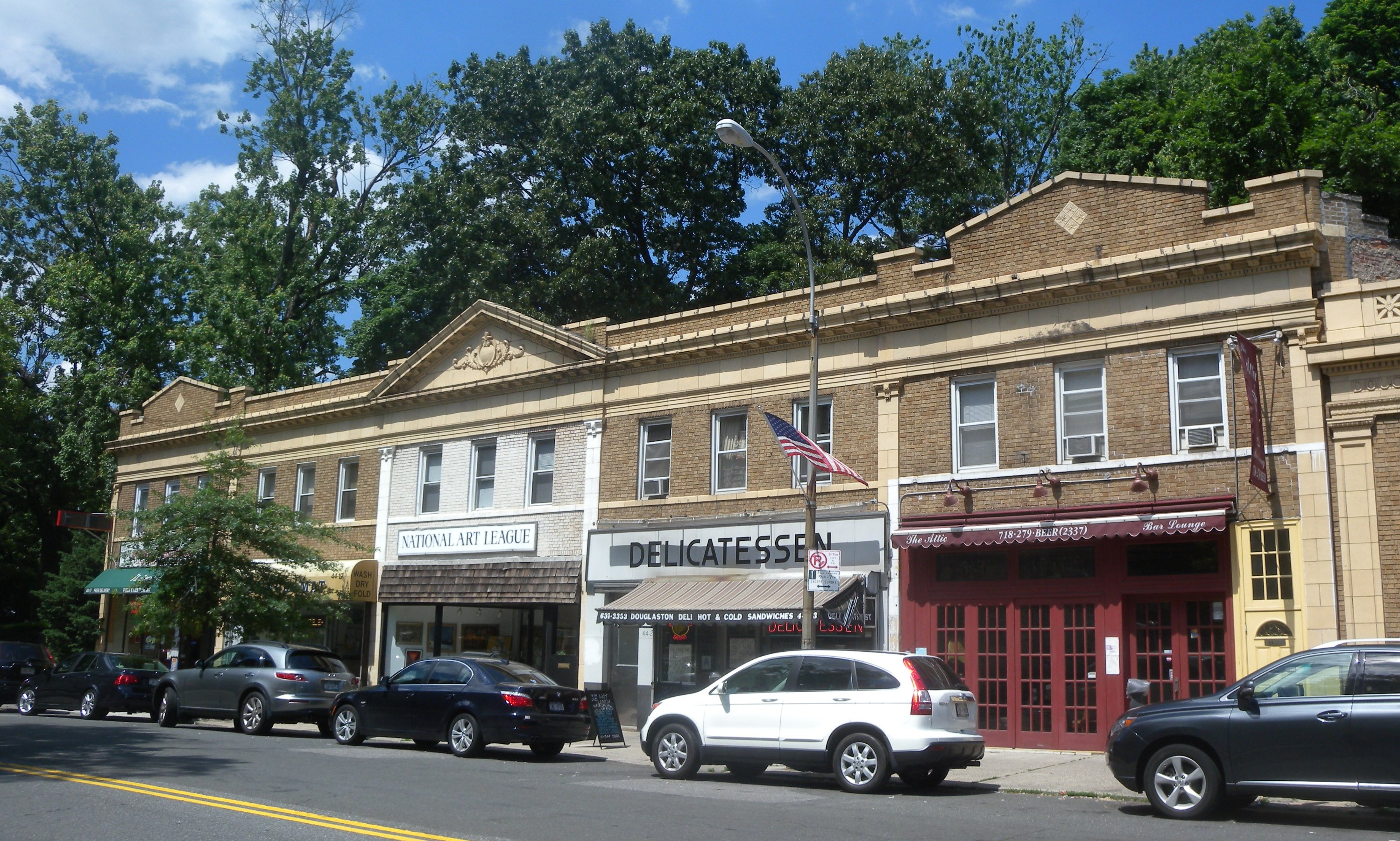
- A block of shops on Douglaston Parkway; the National Art League occupies part of this block
- Interactive map of Douglaston–Little Neck
- Coordinates: 40.77°N 73.75°W
- Country: United States
- State: New York
- City: New York City
- County/Borough: Queens
- Community District: Queens 11
- Founder: George Douglas

Population (2010)
  - Total: 17,823

Economics
  - Median income: ▲$85,500 (2019)
- Time zone: UTC−05:00 (EST)
  - Summer (DST): UTC−04:00 (EDT)
- ZIP Codes: 11362, 11363
- Area codes: 718, 347, 929, and 917

Douglaston–Little Neck is a neighborhood in the northeastern part of the New York City borough of Queens. The community is on the North Shore of Long Island, bordered to the east by Great Neck in Nassau County, to the south by Glen Oaks and the North Shore Towers, and to the west by Bayside.

The neighborhood has two main sections. Little Neck generally refers to the area east of Marathon Parkway and/or north of Northern Boulevard, while Douglaston is the rest of the neighborhood; these classifications may overlap depending on different interpretations of boundaries. Each of these areas has several subsections. Douglaston–Little Neck is one of New York City's least traditionally urban communities, with many areas (particularly those north of Northern Boulevard) having a distinctly suburban feel, similar to that of Nassau County towns nearby, such as Great Neck.

The area is also known for its historical society and other civic groups, notably the Douglaston Civic Association and the Douglas Manor Association. Two historic districts, Douglas Manor and Douglaston Hill, and two houses, Allen-Beville House and Cornelius Van Wyck House, are listed on the National Register of Historic Places.

Douglaston–Little Neck is in Queens Community District 11 and its ZIP Codes are 11362 and 11363. It is patrolled by the New York City Police Department's 111th Precinct. Douglaston–Little Neck is represented by the New York City Council's 19th and 23rd Districts.

== Geography ==
Douglaston–Little Neck is bounded by Cross Island Parkway to the west, Grand Central Parkway to the south, the New York City-Nassau County border to the east, and Little Neck Bay to the north.

Douglaston is considered the area west of Marathon Parkway and north of Grand Central Parkway. According to The New York Times, Douglaston has six distinct neighborhoods. Douglas Bay, Douglas Manor, and Douglaston Hill are north of Northern Boulevard, on the peninsula abutting Little Neck Bay. Douglas Manor takes up most of the peninsula north of the Long Island Rail Road's Port Washington Branch, while Douglaston Hill takes up a small section between the LIRR and Northern Boulevard. Douglaston Park is the area between Northern Boulevard and Interstate 495 (I-495, the Long Island Expressway). There are two areas south of I-495, Winchester Estates and an area simply called Douglaston. Winchester Estates is west of Douglaston Park and the remainder of the area south of I-495 is without a distinct name other than Douglaston.

Little Neck is the area east of Marathon Parkway and north of Grand Central Parkway. Little Neck itself has three subsections: Pines, Westmoreland, and Little Neck Hills.

== History ==
=== Early settlement ===
The earliest known residents of the area that would become Douglaston–Little Neck were the Matinecock Native Americans. They were sustained by the seafood in Little Neck Bay.

Early Dutch settlers were drawn to the area by the rich land and abundant fishing. In the 17th century, European settlers began arriving in the area for its conveniently located harbor. Soon after, the British and Dutch gained control of the Matinecock lands peacefully, except for a small area known as Madnan's Neck (possibly a shortened form of Native American name for the area, Menhaden-ock, or "place of fish"). Thomas Hicks, of the Hicks family that eventually founded Hicksville, and a band of armed settlers forcibly drove out the Matinecock in a battle at today's Northern Boulevard and Marathon Parkway.

=== 19th century ===
In 1796, Hicks's estate passed to Thomas Wickes (1770–1854), and in 1819, to Wyant Van Zandt, a wealthy merchant, who built a large Greek Revival mansion in the area. Today, this mansion houses the Douglaston Club, a private club with tennis courts, social activities and swimming pools. In 1835, George Douglas bought 240 acres (0.97 km^{2}) of land along with Van Zandt's mansion. Upon Douglas' death in 1862, the land was inherited by his son, William Douglas.

Douglaston Hill is the oldest area of the community, and is characterized by turn-of-the-20th-century homes in Queen Anne and Victorian styles. It was laid out with very large lots in 1853, at the very beginning of a movement in the United States to create suburban gardens. The area was recognized as a New York City Historic District in December 2004 by the New York City Landmarks Preservation Commission. The Douglaston Hill Historic District was listed on the National Register of Historic Places in 2000.

The settlers thrived growing produce for the Manhattan market and the area was used as a dock on Little Neck Bay. The Little Neck and Douglaston stations opened in 1866 on the North Shore Railroad (now the Long Island Rail Road's Port Washington Branch and the same line featured prominently in the famous F. Scott Fitzgerald novel The Great Gatsby) to serve the community and the dock area. Northern Boulevard was developed into a commercial and cultural hub, and the Little Neck Theater, a 576-seat movie theater, was opened in 1929 at the intersection of Northern Boulevard and Morgan Street. The theater was closed in 1983.

From the 1860s through the 1890s, small hard clams (quahogs) from Little Neck Bay were served in the best restaurants of New York and several European capitals. Eventually, the term "littleneck" or "littleneck clam" came to be used as a size category for all hard clams, regardless of origin.

Little Neck was also famous for being the last stop on the Underground Railroad until 1865.

=== 20th century ===
In the early 20th century, the Rickert-Finlay Realty Company of Manhattan purchased 175 acres (0.71 km^{2}) of the Douglas' family holdings, and formed the Douglas Manor Association, creating a planned community. Many of the houses in this area were built in architectural styles popular at the time, such as Tudor, Mediterranean, Colonial Revival, and Arts and Crafts. In 1997, New York City's Landmarks Preservation Commission designated Douglas Manor as the Douglaston Historic District, ensuring that no new buildings or external alterations could be made without the commission's approval. The Douglaston Historic District was listed on the National Register of Historic Places in 2005.

An old Matinecock cemetery remained on Northern Boulevard between Cornell Lane and Jesse Court. One of the last photographs of the cemetery was taken by the Daily News in August 1931, a few months before it was removed to make room for a widened Northern Boulevard. The remains from the cemetery were moved to the Zion Episcopal Church of Douglaston and placed under a stone marker that reads "Here rest the last of the Matinecoc."

Other areas of Douglaston–Little Neck were developed during the latter half of the 20th century. Douglaston Park contains a mixture of large, older homes as well as Capes, Tudors, and ranch-style homes dating from the 1960s. The areas adjacent to the Douglaston Shopping Center are occupied mainly by attached single-family homes built in the 1950s through 1970s (Beech Hills, Deepdale, and another development known colloquially as the "Korvette's Houses" due to the former proximity of an E.J. Korvette department store), as well as four-story condominiums added in the mid-1980s.

In addition to the Douglaston Historic District and Douglaston Hill Historic District, the Allen-Beville House and Cornelius Van Wyck House are listed on the National Register of Historic Places.

== Demographics ==
Based on data from the 2010 United States census, the population of Douglaston–Little Neck was 24,739.

The racial makeup of the neighborhood was 53.3% (13,195) White, 1.3% (317) African American, (15) Native American, 35.6% (8,818) Asian, 0.0% (2) Pacific Islander, 0.3% (69) from other races, and 1.2% (308) from two or more races. Hispanic or Latino of any race were 8.1% (2,015) of the population.

The entirety of Community Board 11, which comprises both Douglaston–Little Neck and Bayside, had 119,628 inhabitants as of NYC Health's 2018 Community Health Profile, with an average life expectancy of 84.7 years. This is higher than the median life expectancy of 81.2 for all New York City neighborhoods. Most inhabitants are youth and middle-aged adults: 19% are between the ages of between 0–17, 26% between 25 and 44, and 31% between 45 and 64. The ratio of college-aged and elderly residents was lower, at 6% and 18% respectively.

As of 2017, the median household income in Community Board 11 was $70,155. In 2018, an estimated 14% of Douglaston–Little Neck and Bayside residents lived in poverty, compared to 19% in all of Queens and 20% in all of New York City. One in seventeen residents (6%) were unemployed, compared to 8% in Queens and 9% in New York City. Rent burden, or the percentage of residents who have difficulty paying their rent, is 49% in Douglaston–Little Neck and Bayside, lower than the boroughwide and citywide rates of 53% and 51% respectively. Based on this calculation, as of 2018, Douglaston–Little Neck and Bayside are considered to be high-income relative to the rest of the city and not gentrifying.

== Community ==
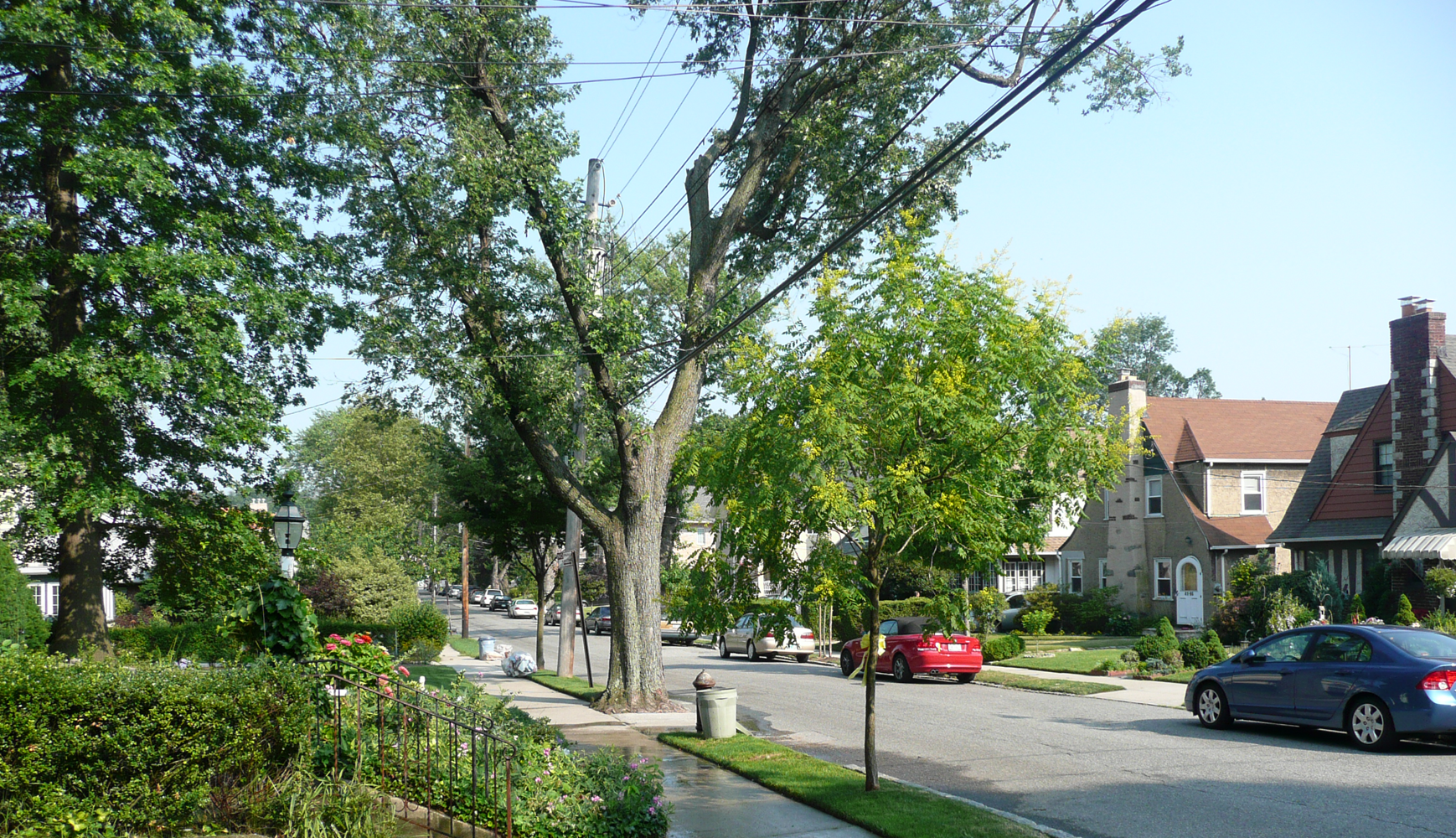
Residential street

Every year Douglaston–Little Neck hosts a Memorial Day Parade which runs from Great Neck to Douglaston Parkway along Northern Boulevard.

Other community activities include Theater á la Cartè, which provides live theater at the Douglaston Community Church and the Douglaston Community Theater players, who perform at the Zion Episcopal Church. The National Art League on Douglaston Parkway offers classes and provides a place for artists to show and sell their work. Monthly concerts are held at the Douglaston Community Church.

A local volunteer ambulance corps, the Little Neck–Douglaston Community Ambulance Corps is supported and run by people in the community. It hosts blood drives and free classes to teach the community CPR.

The First Tuesday in August also marks National Night Out, a community building event in Douglaston, held at the Douglaston Plaza. The event is held by the NYPD, in efforts to build a stronger community. The event features bouncy houses, barbecues, raffles, music, face-painting and free medical check ups.

== Economy ==
Douglaston–Little Neck has many independently owned and operated restaurants and shops, many of which are located in the area around the intersection of Douglaston Parkway or Little Neck Parkway and Northern Boulevard. This area is home to a distinct cultural presence and traditional New York City–style pizzerias, delis, and bodegas.

The Douglaston Plaza Shopping Center is a major hub of the community's economic activity. It contains a supermarket and other retail outlets and restaurants.

== Police and crime ==
Douglaston–Little Neck and Bayside are patrolled by the 111th Precinct of the NYPD, located at 45-06 215th Street. The 111th Precinct ranked 8th safest out of 69 patrol areas for per-capita crime in 2010. As of 2018, with a non-fatal assault rate of 8 per 100,000 people, Douglaston–Little Neck and Bayside's rate of violent crimes per capita is the lowest of any area in New York City. The incarceration rate of 110 per 100,000 people is lower than that of the city as a whole.

The 111th Precinct has a lower crime rate than in the 1990s, with crimes across all categories having decreased by 88.6% between 1990 and 2018. The precinct reported 0 murders, 7 rapes, 35 robberies, 74 felony assaults, 163 burglaries, 361 grand larcenies, and 37 grand larcenies auto in 2018.

== Fire safety ==
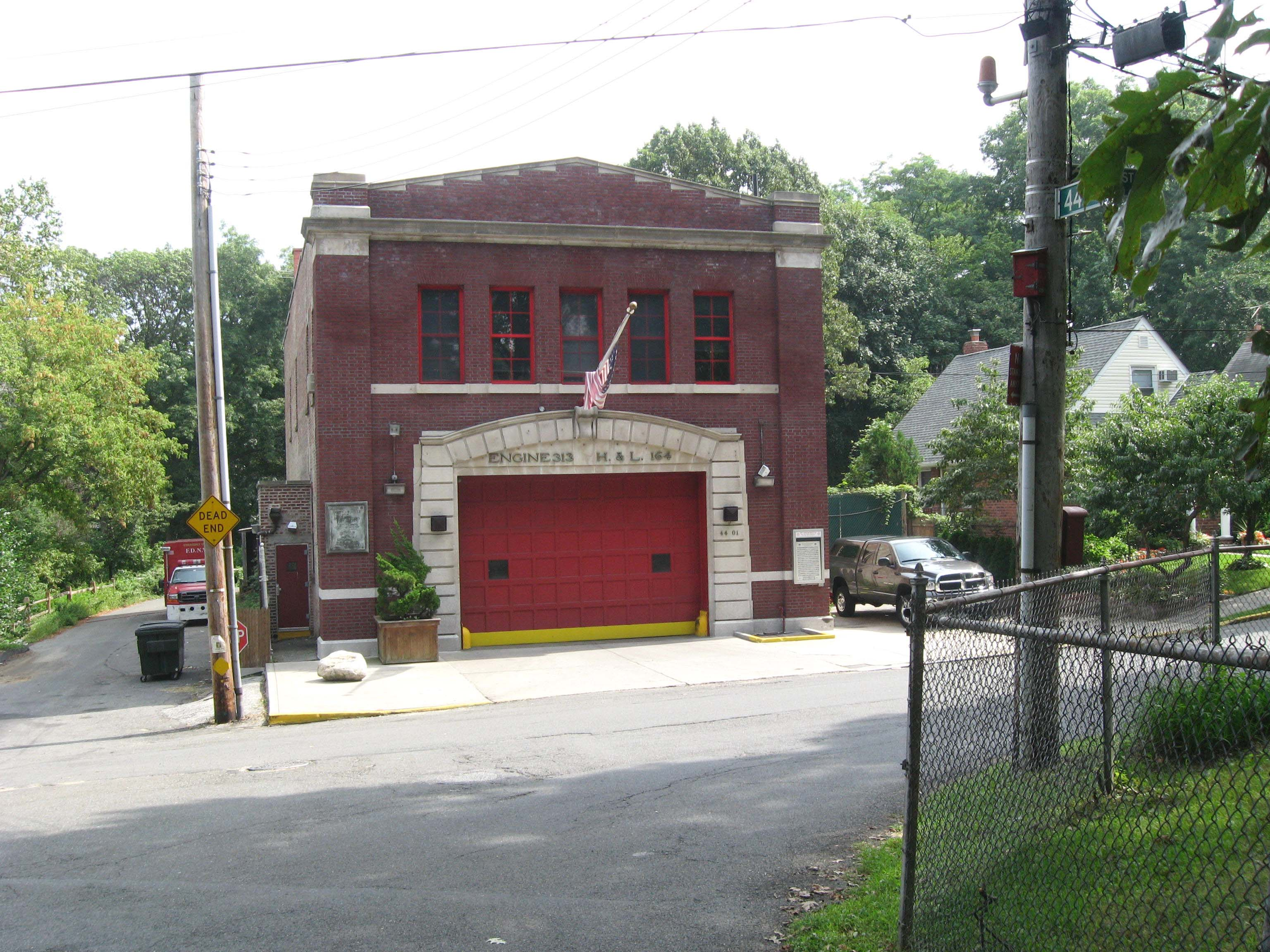
Engine Co. 313/Ladder Co. 164

Douglaston–Little Neck contains a New York City Fire Department (FDNY) fire station, Engine Co. 313/Ladder Co. 164, at 44-01 244th Street.

The FDNY EMS Training Academy is located in Bay Terrace at Fort Totten. The site also contains a museum of FDNY EMS history.

== Health ==
Preterm and teenage births are less common in Douglaston–Little Neck and Bayside than in other places citywide. In Douglaston–Little Neck and Bayside, there were 81 preterm births per 1,000 live births (compared to 87 per 1,000 citywide), and 1.9 births to teenage mothers per 1,000 live births (compared to 19.3 per 1,000 citywide). Douglaston–Little Neck and Bayside have a low population of residents who are uninsured. In 2018, this population of uninsured residents was estimated to be 5%, lower than the citywide rate of 12%, though this was based on a small sample size.

The concentration of fine particulate matter, the deadliest type of air pollutant, in Douglaston–Little Neck and Bayside is 0.0069 milligrams per cubic metre (6.9×10^{−9} oz/ft^{3}), less than the city average. Ten percent of Douglaston–Little Neck and Bayside residents are smokers, which is lower than the city average of 14% of residents being smokers. In Douglaston–Little Neck and Bayside, 20% of residents are obese, 7% are diabetic, and 26% have high blood pressure—compared to the citywide averages of 22%, 8%, and 23% respectively. In addition, 11% of children are obese, compared to the citywide average of 20%.

Ninety-four percent of residents eat some fruits and vegetables every day, which is more than the city's average of 87%. In 2018, 86% of residents described their health as "good", "very good", or "excellent", higher than the city's average of 78%. For every supermarket in Douglaston–Little Neck and Bayside, there are 5 bodegas.

The nearest major hospital is Long Island Jewish Medical Center in Glen Oaks. Little Neck Hospital closed in 1996.

== Post offices and ZIP Codes ==
Douglaston–Little Neck is covered by two ZIP Codes. The section between Northern Boulevard and Long Island Expressway is covered by 11362, while the Little Neck peninsula north of Northern Boulevard is within 11363. The United States Post Office operates two post offices within the neighborhood:

- Horace Harding Station – 56-01 Marathon Parkway
- Little Neck Station – 250-10 Northern Boulevard

== Parks and recreation ==
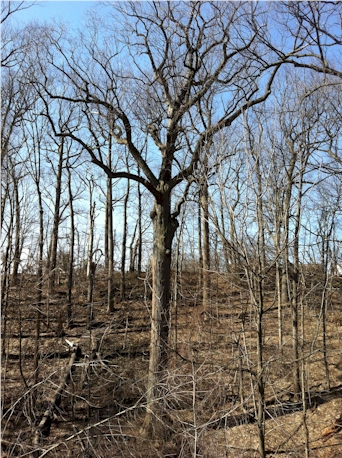
The Queens Giant measures 133.8 feet (40.8 m) tall and is probably the oldest living thing in the New York metropolitan area.

Several parks are under the administration of the New York City Department of Parks and Recreation. Along the western waterfront is Alley Pond Park, a 635-acre (2.57 km^{2}) wildlife and bird sanctuary, and home to the Queens Giant, the oldest known tree (and living thing) in New York City. To the east along the water is Udalls Cove, a 90-acre (360,000 m^{2}) wildlife sanctuary.

Because northern Douglaston–Little Neck is surrounded by water, many residents take advantage of the waterfront. The Douglaston Yacht Squadron is the local yacht club (there is also a junior yachting program called Douglaston Junior Sailing (DJYS), which teaches youngsters under the age of 16 years how to sail). It is a part of the Douglaston Club, a country club based in Douglas' original mansion in Douglas Manor. The Douglaston Club is also site of various community events, such as the Douglaston Chess Congress' annual championships, which decides the community's best players. Tennis is also a popular sport in the neighborhood.

Southern Douglaston–Little Neck has an 18-hole, par 67 golf course. Formerly known as the North Hills Country Club, the 104-acre (0.42 km^{2}) course opened in 1927 and became a municipal course in the 1960s. The Douglaston Park Golf Course underwent significant renovations in 2004. The course is situated at one of the highest points in the borough of Queens, providing views of the Manhattan skyline, and has a restaurant.

== Education ==
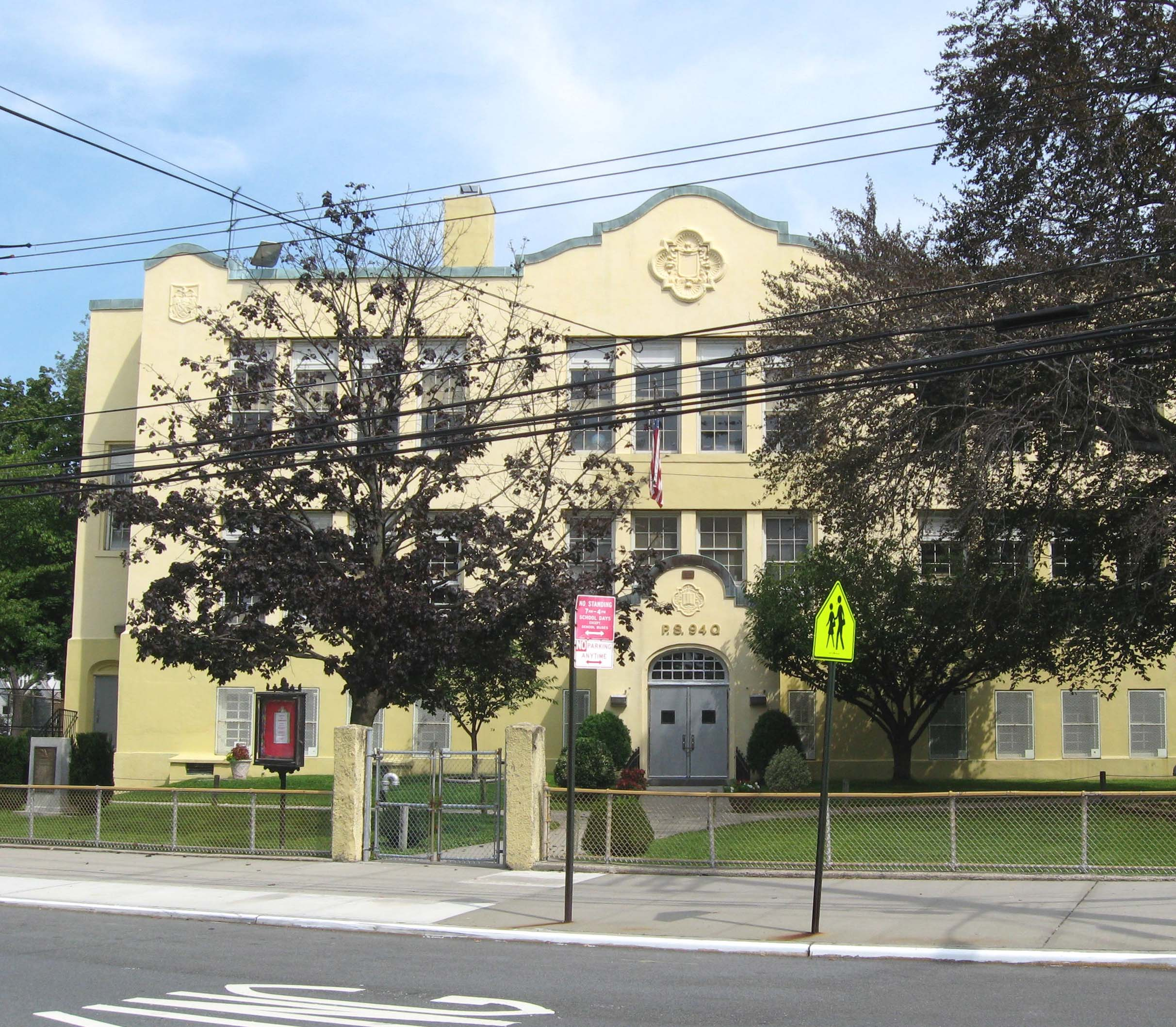
P.S. 94 on 42nd Avenue

Douglaston–Little Neck and Bayside generally have a higher rate of college-educated residents than the rest of the city as of 2018. The majority (52%) of residents age 25 and older have a college education or higher, while 11% have less than a high school education and 37% are high school graduates or have some college education. By contrast, 39% of Queens residents and 43% of city residents have a college education or higher. The percentage of Douglaston–Little Neck and Bayside students excelling in math rose from 70% in 2000 to 88% in 2011, though reading achievement stayed at around 73% during the same time period.

Douglaston–Little Neck and Bayside's rate of elementary school student absenteeism is less than the rest of New York City. In Douglaston–Little Neck and Bayside, 5% of elementary school students missed twenty or more days per school year, the lowest in the city and significantly lower than the citywide average of 20%. Additionally, 95% of high school students in Douglaston–Little Neck and Bayside graduate on time, more than the citywide average of 75%.

=== Schools ===
==== Public schools ====
Douglaston–Little Neck contains several public elementary schools:

- PS 94 David D. Porter (grades PK-5)
- PS 98 The Douglaston School (grades PK-5)
- PS 221 North Hills (grades PK-5)
- PS 811 Multiple Handicap School of Queens (grades 1–6), is devoted to students with physical and mental disabilities. It is an elementary school, for grades 1–6.

These schools feed into JHS 67 Louis Pasteur Middle School, which hosts children in grades 6 through 8. After middle school, Douglaston–Little Neck's public school students are zoned for Benjamin N. Cardozo High School, in neighboring Bayside.

==== Private schools ====
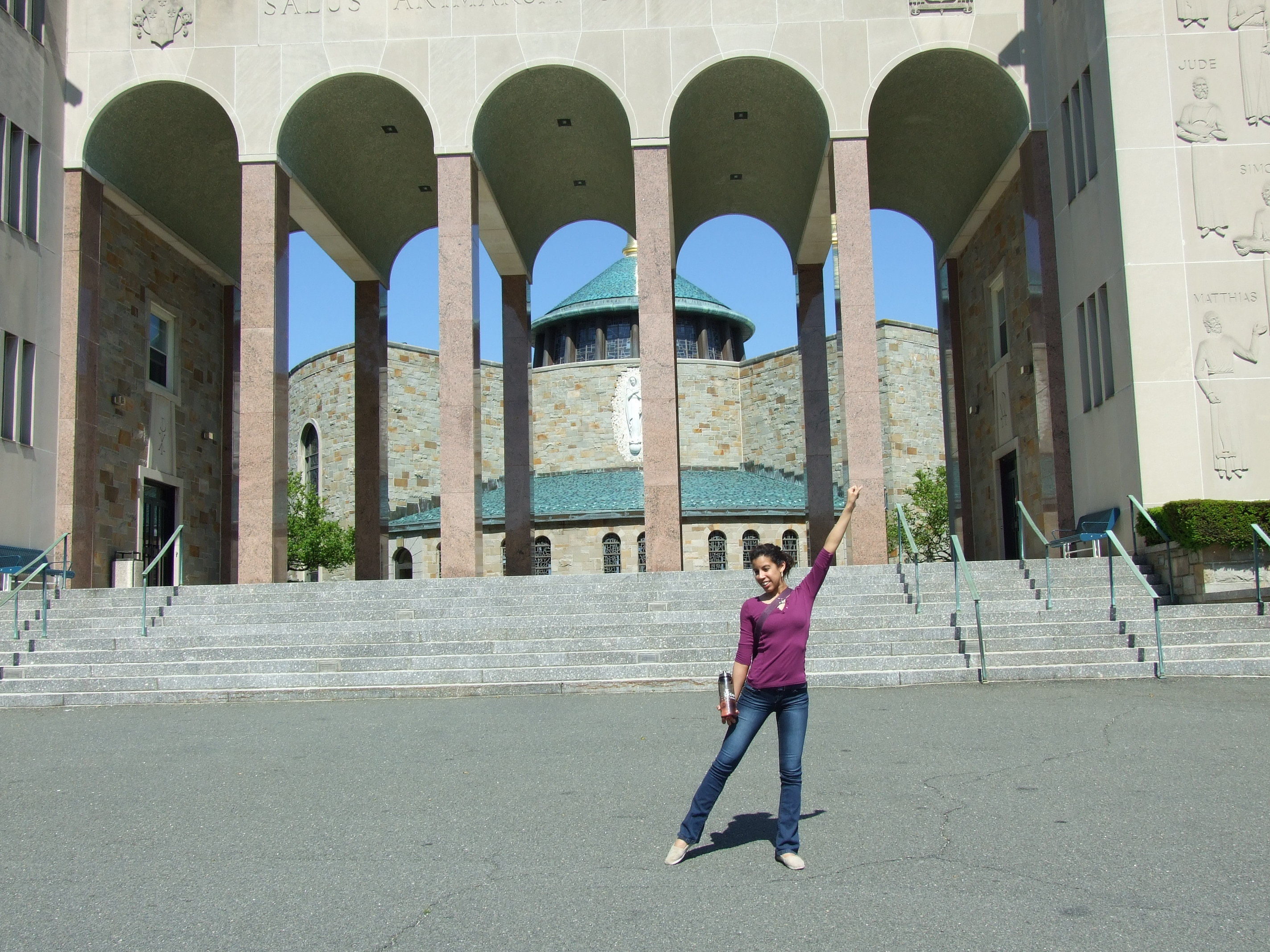
Cathedral College of the Immaculate Conception in Douglaston

Divine Wisdom Catholic Academy is a private Catholic school, with classes from the pre-school level to 8th grade. The Immaculate Conception Center, formerly a college-level seminary named Cathedral College of the Immaculate Conception and owned by the Diocese of Brooklyn, is located in southern Douglaston. It is a large conference center, hosting Diocese events and activities including language immersion classes, lay ministry preparation, adult continuing education, seminarian instruction, parish retreats, and also hosts community civic conferences. In the Fall of 2011, all administrative offices were relocated and the building hosted eighty undergraduate seminarians studying at nearby St. John's University, in addition to retired priests from the Diocese of Brooklyn.

=== Libraries ===
The Queens Public Library operates two branches in the neighborhood. The Douglaston/Little Neck branch is located at 249-01 Northern Boulevard, and the North Hills branch is located at 57-04 Marathon Parkway.

== Transportation ==
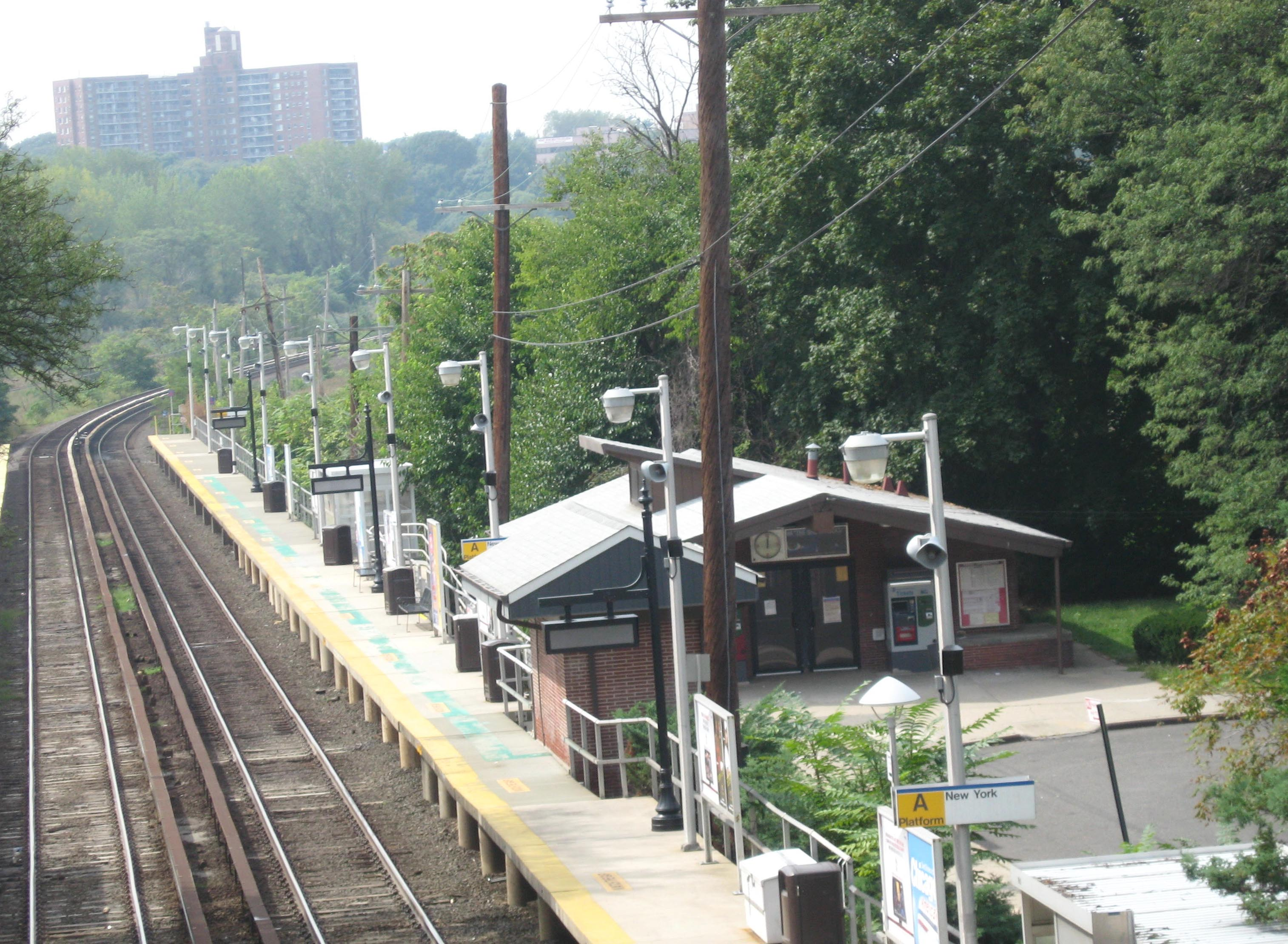
The Douglaston station, looking west from the Douglaston Parkway overpass

Douglaston–Little Neck is served by two stations on the Long Island Rail Road's Port Washington Branch. The Douglaston station is located at 235th Street and 41st Avenue, while the Little Neck station is located at Little Neck Parkway and 39th Road. The latter is located next to a busy railroad crossing with Little Neck Parkway, which is regarded as one of the most dangerous in New York City due to its high volume of traffic.

Though there are no New York City Subway stations near Douglaston–Little Neck, the neighborhood is served by MTA Regional Bus Operations' Q12, Q30 and Q36 local buses, which connect to the subway. In addition, the QM5, QM8 and QM35 express buses provide direct service to Manhattan, while the n20G and n20X buses provide closed-door bus service between the neighborhood and Roslyn.

Two major Long Island highways pass through Douglaston–Little Neck: Interstate 495 (the Long Island Expressway) and the Cross Island Parkway. A third, the Grand Central Parkway, forms the southern boundary of the neighborhood.

== Local media ==
The area is served by the Little Neck Ledger, owned by the TimesLedger Newspapers, a chain of 14 weekly newspapers spread throughout Queens. Media giant News Corporation, which also owns the New York Post, bought TimesLedger in October 2006.

== Notable residents ==
- Claudio Arrau (1903–1991), pianist
- Lidia Bastianich (born 1947), celebrity chef (current resident)
- Ruth Benedict (1887–1948), anthropologist, lived here after her marriage in 1914
- Deborah Berke (born 1954), architect of Deborah Berke & Partners and dean of Yale School of Architecture since 2016
- Hugh Auchincloss Brown (1879–1975), electrical engineer and conspiracy theorist, proponent of the cataclysmic pole shift hypothesis
- John Matthew Cannella (1908–1996), United States federal judge who played as an offensive lineman in the NFL for the New York Giants in the 1930s
- Harold Radish (born 1923), one of the last known veterans of World War II and last known veteran of the 90th Infantry Division.
- Mary Carillo (born 1957), sportscaster and former professional tennis player
- James Conlon (born 1950), conductor
- Alex Corbisiero (born 1988), international/pro rugby player who played for the Northampton Saints
- Whitey Ford (1928–2020), baseball player with the New York Yankees and member of the Baseball Hall of Fame
- George Grosz (1893–1959), artist
- Hedda Hopper (1885–1966), gossip columnist, actress
- Jill Johnston (1929–2010), cultural critic for the Village Voice
- Alan Kalter (1943–2021), announcer on the Late Show with David Letterman
- Philip La Follette (1897–1965), three-term Governor of Wisconsin
- Angela Lansbury (1925-2022), actress
- Crystal Liu, (born 1987) Chinese actress, model and singer
- Dick Lynch (1936–2008), defensive back who played in the NFL for the Washington Redskins and the New York Giants.
- Harold McCracken (1894–1983), explorer and author of books on Frederic Remington and George Catlin
- John McEnroe (born 1959), tennis player
- Patrick McEnroe (born 1966), tennis player
- Thomas Merton (1915–1968), Trappist monk and author of The Seven Storey Mountain
- Robert Neffson (born 1949), painter of street scenes
- Jean Nidetch (1923–2015), founder of Weight Watchers
- Ginger Rogers (1911–1995), actress and dancer
- Anthony Saidy (born 1937), chess champion
- Fred Saidy (1907–1982), playwright and screenwriter, whose works included Finian's Rainbow
- C. I. Scofield (1843–1921), theologian, minister and writer who was the creator of the Scofield Reference Bible
- Oscar Shaw (1887–1967), stage and screen actor and singer
- Frank Spangenberg (born 1957), record-holding Jeopardy! champion
- George Tenet (born 1953), Director of Central Intelligence for the United States
- Arthur Treacher (1894–1975), actor
- Julian M. Wright (1884–1938), judge advocate of the international court in Cairo, Egypt

== In popular culture ==
Scenes from the movies American Gangster, Black Rain, Little Children, The Arrangement, I Never Sang for My Father, Cops and Robbers, and After-Life were filmed in the community. The films Rabbit Hole (2010), Son of No One (2011), and Run All Night (2014) were shot in Douglaston–Little Neck.

In the 1931 film "Smart Woman" starring Mary Astor (as Mrs. Nancy Gibson), letters are addressed to Nancy at her mansion in "Little Neck Hills, NY."

In the 30 Rock episode "Hiatus", the community stood in for Needmore, Pennsylvania. Mary Hudson, a character in "The Laughing Man", a short story by J. D. Salinger, is from this community. "Machine", the masked character from the 1999 film 8mm, lived with his mother in Douglaston–Little Neck and some of the film was shot in the neighborhood.

The Zion Episcopal Church was the setting for the movie First Reformed starring Ethan Hawke as well as the television series The Blacklist.

In Jessica Jones season 1, the neighborhood served as the location of Jessica's childhood home. Douglaston also appeared in Daredevil season 3 as the location of Ray Nadeem's house.
