= Douglaston station =

Long Island Rail Road station in Queens, New York

Douglaston
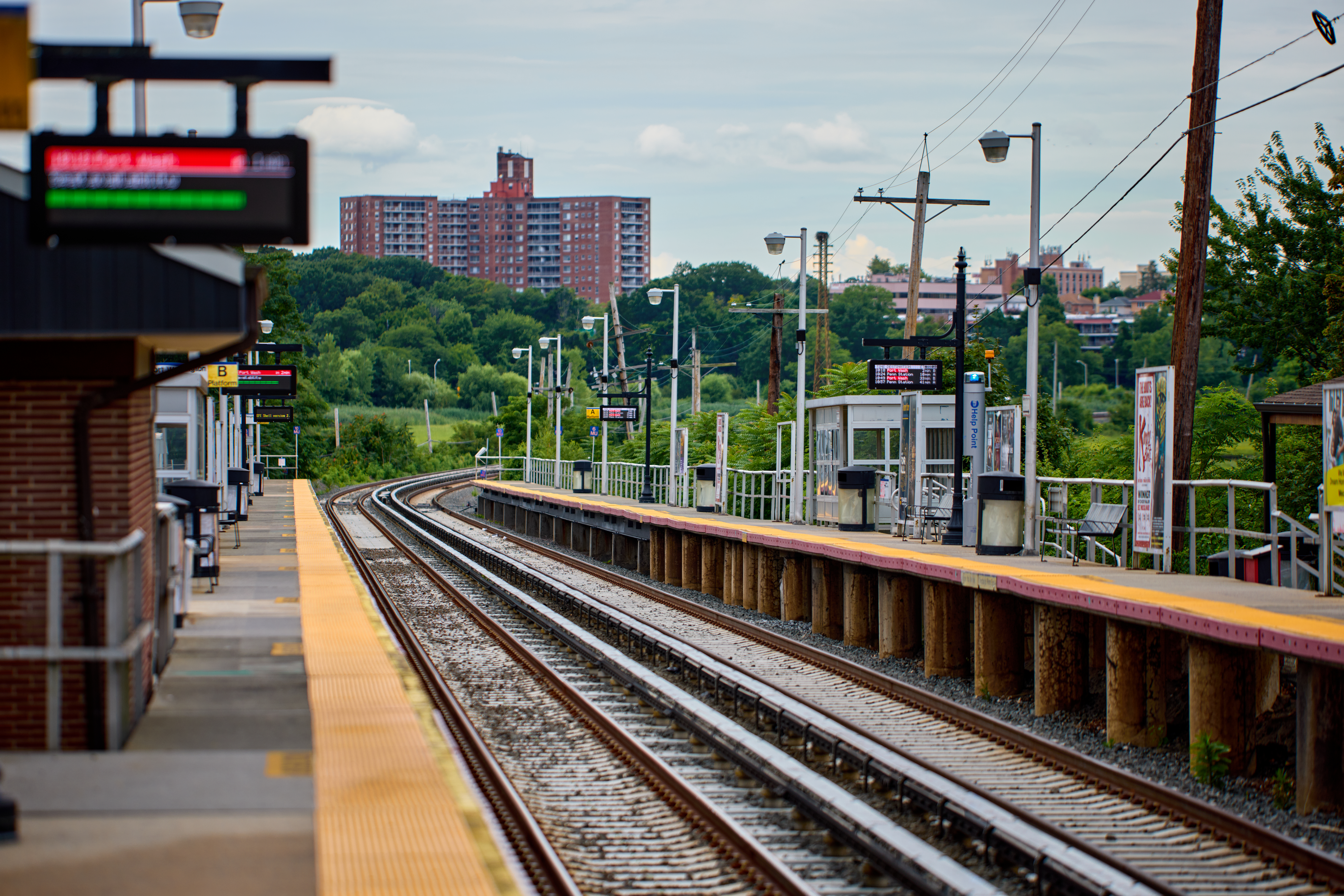
- The Douglaston station, as seen in 2022

General information
- Location: 235th Street and 41st Avenue; Douglaston, Queens, New York
- Coordinates: 40.768°N 73.7496°W
- Owner: Long Island Rail Road
- Line: Port Washington Branch
- Distance: 12.1 mi (19.5 km) from Long Island City
- Platforms: 2 side platforms
- Tracks: 2
- Connections: NYCT Bus: Q12; Nassau Inter-County Express: n20G, n20X

Construction
- Parking: Yes (private)
- Cycle facilities: Yes
- Accessible: yes

Other information
- Station code: DGL
- Fare zone: 3

History
- Opened: October 27, 1866 (NY&F)
- Rebuilt: 1887, 1962
- Electrified: October 21, 1913; 750 V (DC) third rail
- Former names: Little Neck (1866–June 1870)

Passengers
- 2012—2014: 2,478 per weekday
- Rank: 44 of 126

Services
Preceding station	Long Island Rail Road	Following station
Bayside toward Penn Station or Grand Central	Port Washington Branch	Little Neck toward Port Washington
Location

Douglaston is a station on the Long Island Rail Road's Port Washington Branch in the Douglaston neighborhood of Queens, New York City. The station is at 235th Street and 41st Avenue, off Douglaston Parkway and Wainscott Avenue, and is 13.9 miles (22.4 km) from Penn Station in Midtown Manhattan. The station is part of CityTicket, and has an underground walkway between the two platforms.

== History ==
Douglaston station was originally built on October 27, 1866 by the North Shore Railroad of Long Island, a subsidiary of the New York and Flushing Railroad that named it Little Neck Station. A depot at the station was built in April–May 1867 at the expense of William P. Douglas, owner of most of the land in the area, and was named Douglaston in his honor, though the station was listed on timetables as "Little Neck" from 1866 to June 1870. The depot was repaired and furnished with a freight platform in June 1870, and it was made into a two-story building in the summer of 1871.

In 1870, a new Little Neck Station was built east of this one at its present location by the Flushing and North Side Railroad, and the existing station was renamed for land-owner and developer William P. Douglas. In 1887, Douglas himself replaced the original station and built a Queen Anne-style building for $6,000. The original depot was moved to a private site on Little Neck Parkway, where it was still in use as a storehouse in 1914.

Long after the F&NS was acquired by the LIRR, the Douglas-built depot was torn down and replaced with a one-story Mid-Century modern station house in 1962, as was the case with many LIRR stations during the 1950s and 1960s. In this case, the previous station was genuinely in poor condition, and the newer station was designed by a local resident Allan Gordon Lorimer, and accepted both by the LIRR and Douglaston residents. The wooden shelters were replaced with matching tunnel entrances. Aside from the high-level platforms and the addition of MTA Ticket Vending Machines, the station has remained in the same condition ever since.

== Station layout ==
The station has two at-grade high-level side platforms, each 10 cars long.
