= Little Neck station =

Long Island Rail Road station in Queens, New York

Little Neck
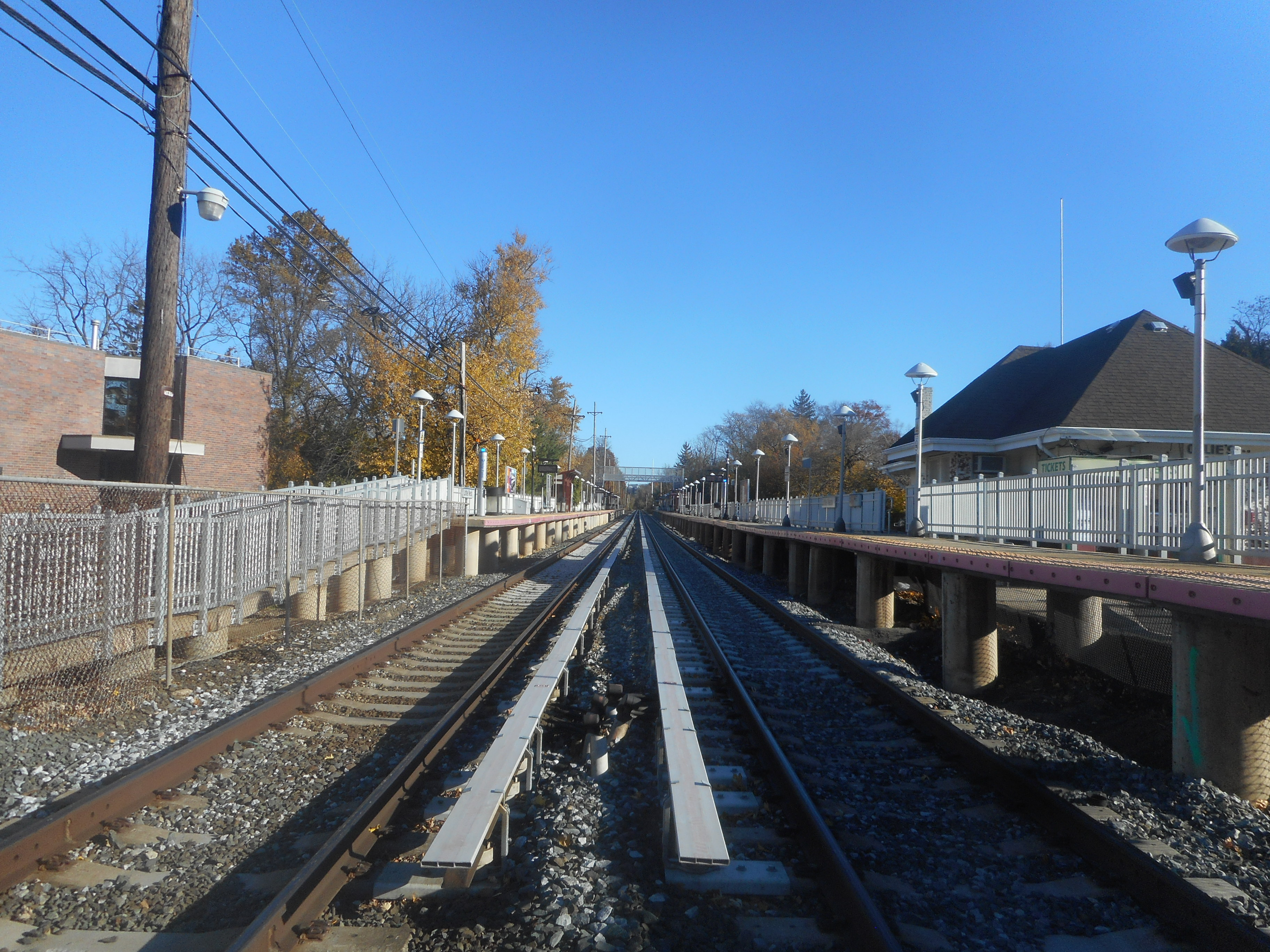
- The station, as seen from Little Neck Parkway

General information
- Location: Little Neck Parkway and 39th Road; Little Neck, Queens, New York
- Coordinates: 40.775°N 73.740744°W
- Owner: Long Island Rail Road
- Line: Port Washington Branch
- Distance: 12.7 mi (20.4 km) from Long Island City
- Platforms: 2 side platforms
- Tracks: 2
- Connections: NYCT Bus: Q12, Q36; Nassau Inter-County Express: n20G, n20X

Construction
- Parking: Yes
- Cycle facilities: Yes
- Accessible: Yes

Other information
- Station code: LNK
- Fare zone: 3

History
- Opened: June 1870 (F&NS)
- Rebuilt: 1890
- Electrified: October 21, 1913; 750 V (DC) third rail

Passengers
- 2012—2014: 3,354
- Rank: 35 of 125

Services
Preceding station	Long Island Rail Road	Following station
Douglaston toward Penn Station or Grand Central	Port Washington Branch	Great Neck toward Port Washington
Location

Little Neck is a station on the Long Island Rail Road's Port Washington Branch, in the Little Neck neighborhood of Queens, New York City. The station is located at Little Neck Parkway and 39th Road, about half a mile (800 m) north of Northern Boulevard (NY 25A). It is 14.5 miles (23.3 km) from Pennsylvania Station in Midtown Manhattan, and is the easternmost station located within New York City served by the Port Washington Branch. The station is part of the CityTicket program.

== History ==
The original station house was built between February and May 1870 by the Flushing and North Side Railroad, and is one of only two built by the F&NS along the Port Washington Branch. The depot was built on the south side of the tracks and east of Little Neck Parkway. The station building was erected by Benjamin Wooley, and was 16 by 26 feet, two stories high, with a high platform in front, and 75 feet (23 m). The station cost $1,500. The station opened in June 1870 as Little Neck, superseding earlier Little Neck station, which reverted to the name of Douglaston. It was replaced by the Long Island City and Flushing Railroad in 1890 with a second station house. The former F&NS depot is now located on a local street off Northern Boulevard. Electric lights were installed in the station in February 1910.

Automatic gates and high level platforms were installed by 1978.

There is a pedestrian overpass at mid-platform links the eastbound and westbound platforms. The original overpass was refurbished in 1989 and was closed and demolished in September 2016. It was replaced by a prefabricated span in December 2016, about the same time as the execution of other renovations station-wide.

== Station layout ==
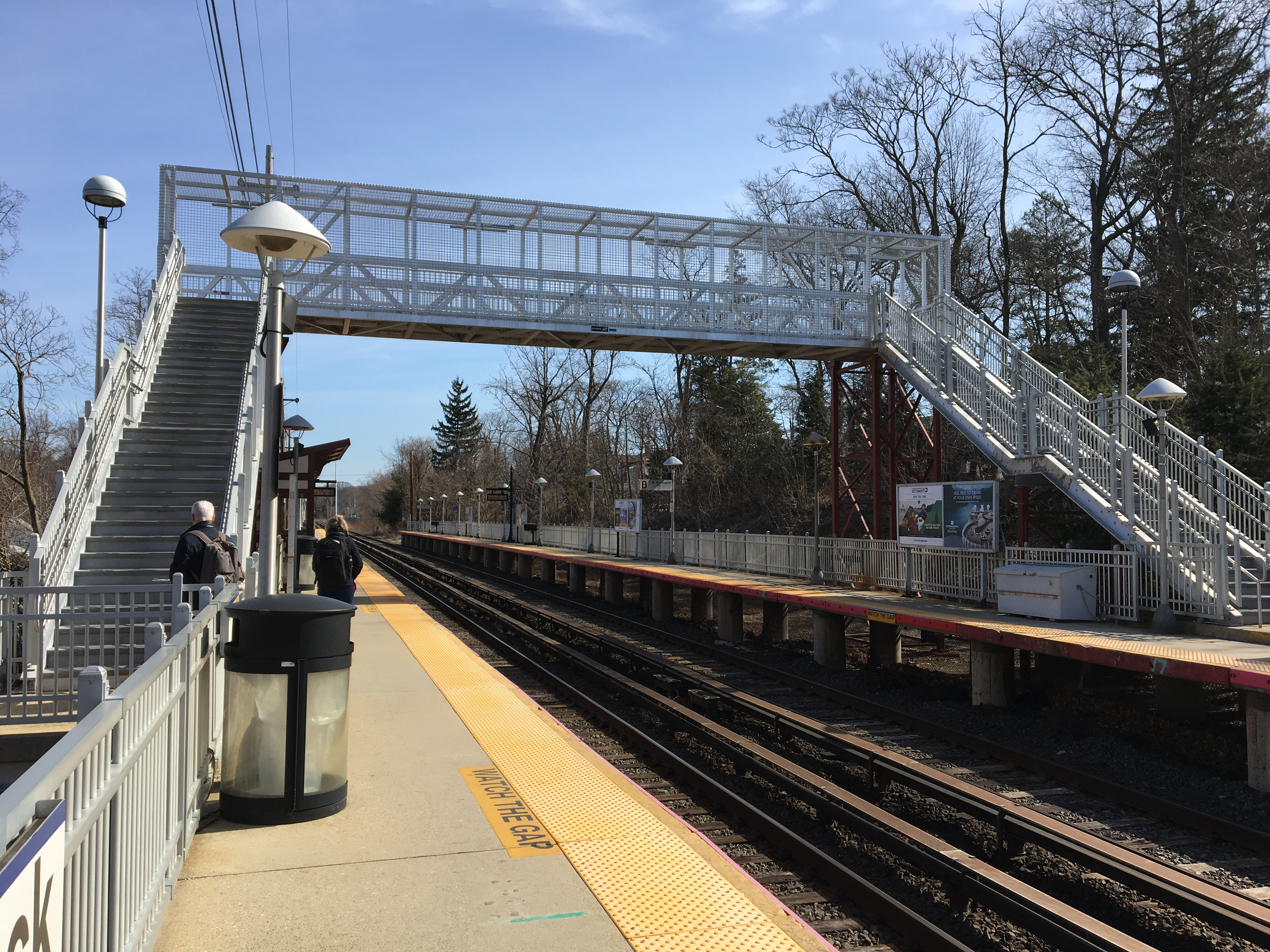
Little Neck station platforms (March 2019)

The station has two at-grade high-level side platforms, each 10 cars long, with a crossover staircase connecting them.

Unlike most station houses on the Port Washington Branch, Little Neck's station house is located on the south (eastbound) side of the station.

=== Grade crossing ===
Little Neck Parkway, located at the west end of the station, crosses the line at the only at-grade railroad crossing on the Port Washington Branch, and one of the few remaining in New York City. It is regarded as one of the most dangerous railroad crossings in the city, as the other crossings carry few trains – usually only freight trains (such as on the Lower Montauk Branch west of Jamaica station and the Bushwick Branch; neither of those branches are electrified).
