= Douglaston Hill Historic District =

Historic district in Queens, New York

- U.S. National Register of Historic Places
- U.S. Historic district
- New York City Landmark
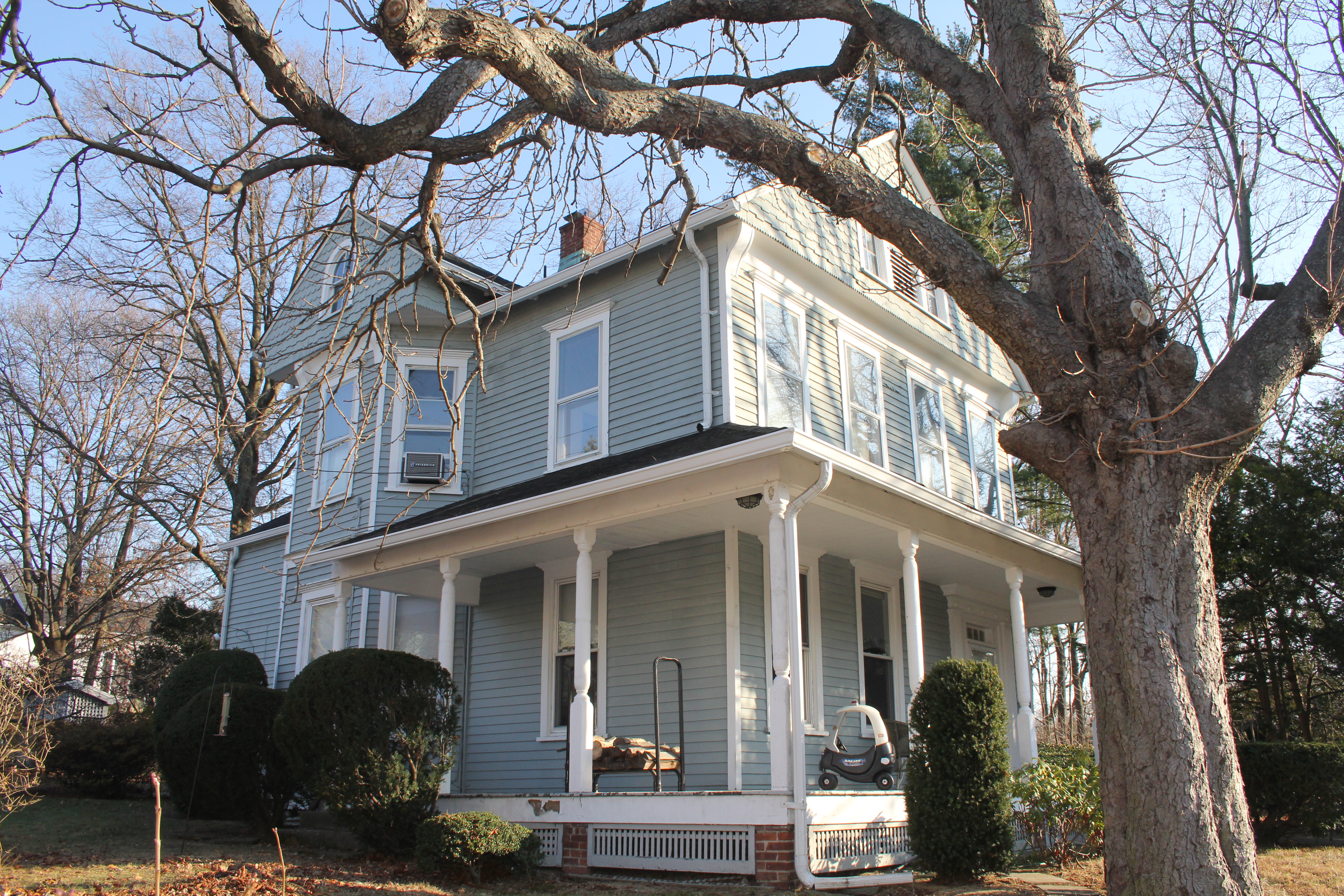
- Zion Episcopal Church Rectory, built 1890
- Location: Roughly bounded by Douglaston Pkwy., Northern Blvd., 244th St., 243rd St., and Long Island RR, Douglaston, New York
- Coordinates: 40°46′3″N 73°44′43″W
- Area: 22.5 acres (9.1 ha)
- Architect: Hamilton, William J.; Stuart, John, et al.
- Architectural style: Queen Anne, Shingle Style, et al.
- NRHP reference No.: 00001016
- NYCL No.: 2155, 2255

Significant dates
- Added to NRHP: August 31, 2000
- Designated NYCL: December 14, 2004 (original); January 30, 2007 (extension)

Douglaston Hill Historic District is a national historic district in Douglaston, Queens, New York. It includes 83 contributing buildings and two contributing sites. The buildings include Zion Episcopal Church (1830), houses and garages, and commercial buildings. The sites are Zion cemetery and public park. It was laid out with very large lots in 1853, at the very beginning of a movement in the United States to create suburban gardens. The buildings include a number of fine examples of late-19th- and early 20th-century architectural styles such as Queen Anne, Shingle Style, and Colonial Revival. The majority of the buildings date between 1890 and 1940.

It was listed on the National Register of Historic Places in 2000. The area was recognized as a New York City designated landmark district in December 2004 by the New York City Landmarks Preservation Commission.

In 2012, some numbered streets in the historic district were renamed to their original names, with 43rd Avenue becoming Pine Street.

== Gallery ==
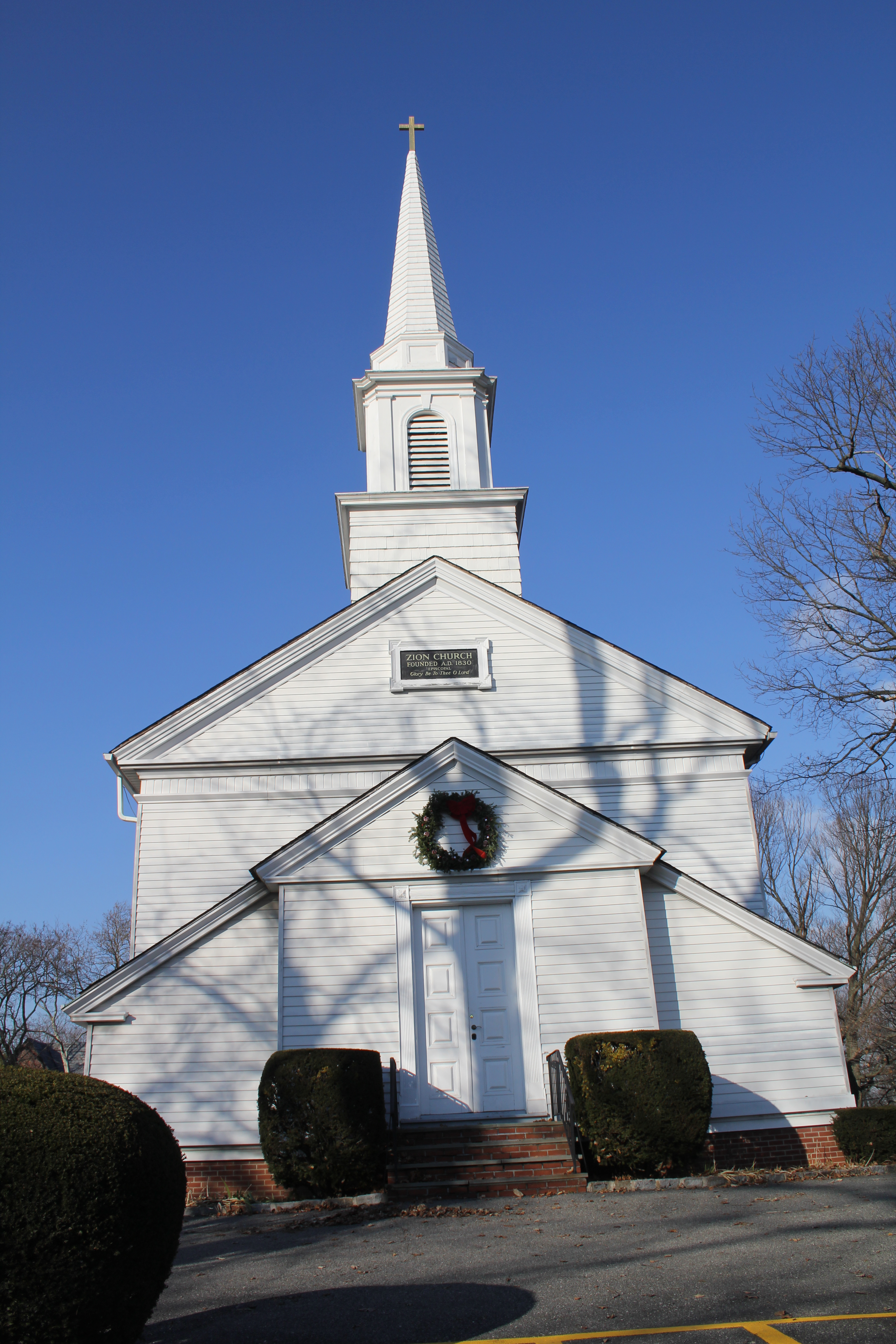
Zion Episcopal Church dates to 1830. This building was built in 1927 after an earlier building burned down.

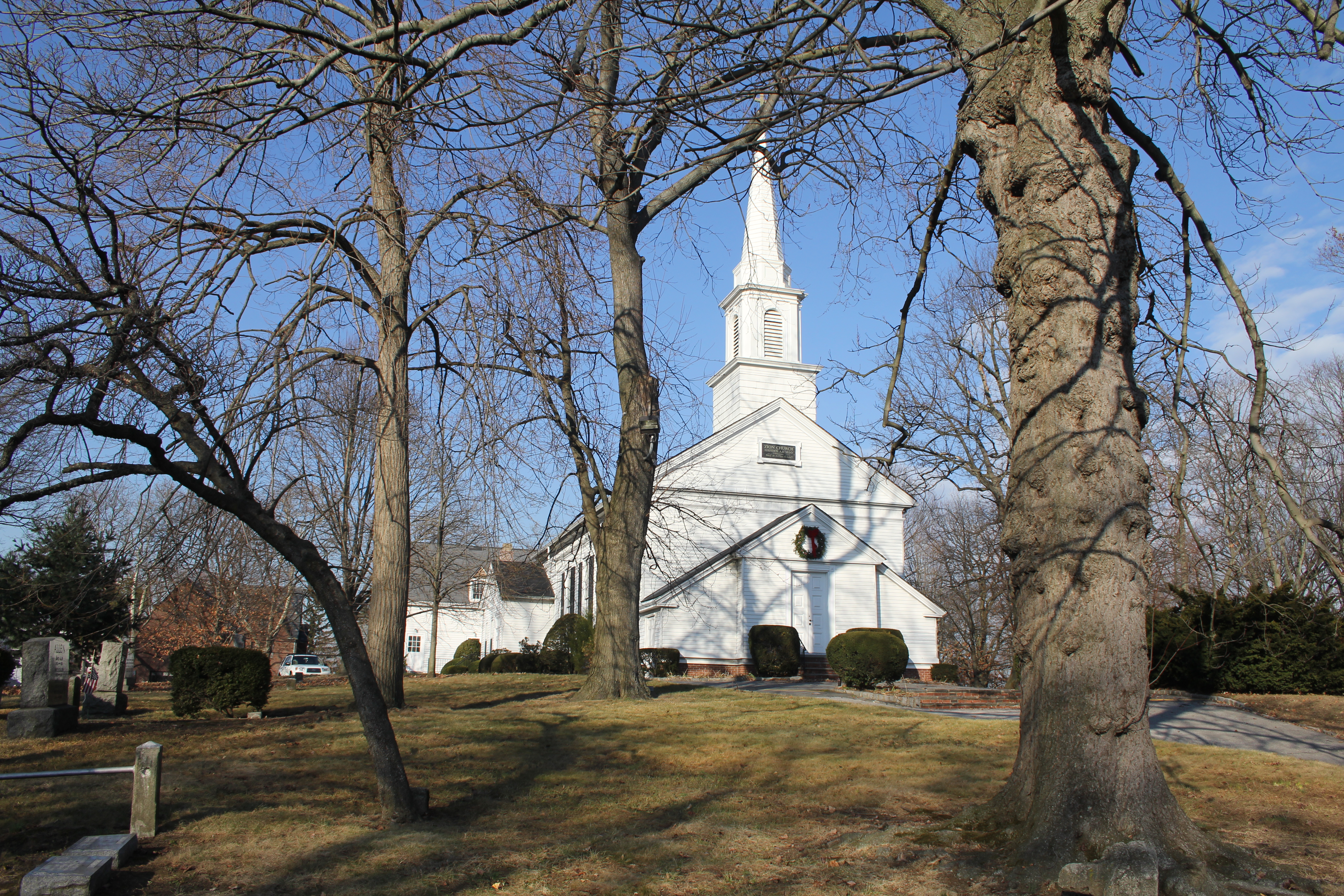
The Zion Episcopal Church building is surrounded by generous grounds that include a cemetery.

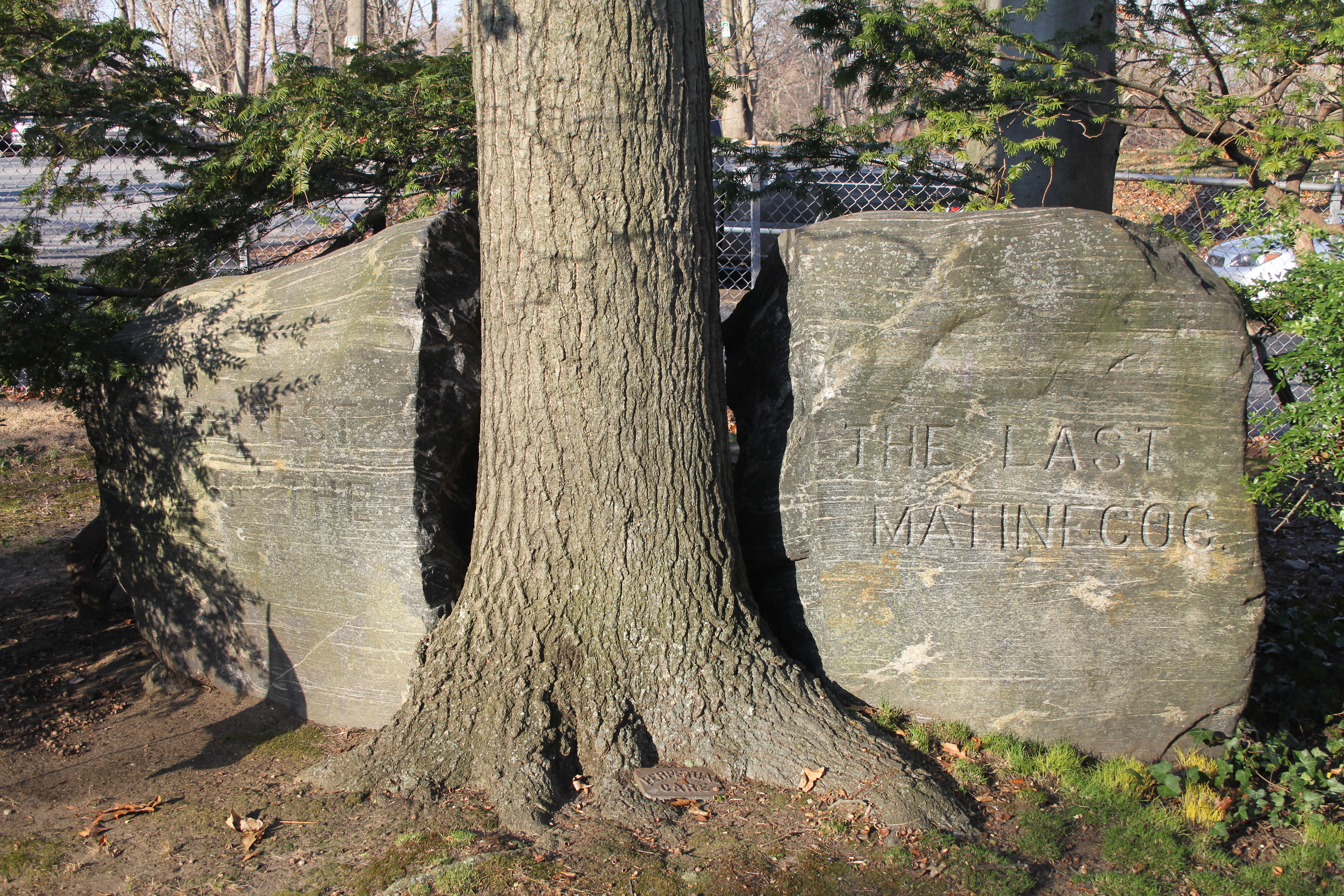
This monument in the Zion church cemetery is inscribed "Here rest the last of the Matinecoc." It commemorates the Native Americans whose remains were found and moved to the cemetery when nearby Northern Boulevard was widened in the 1930s.

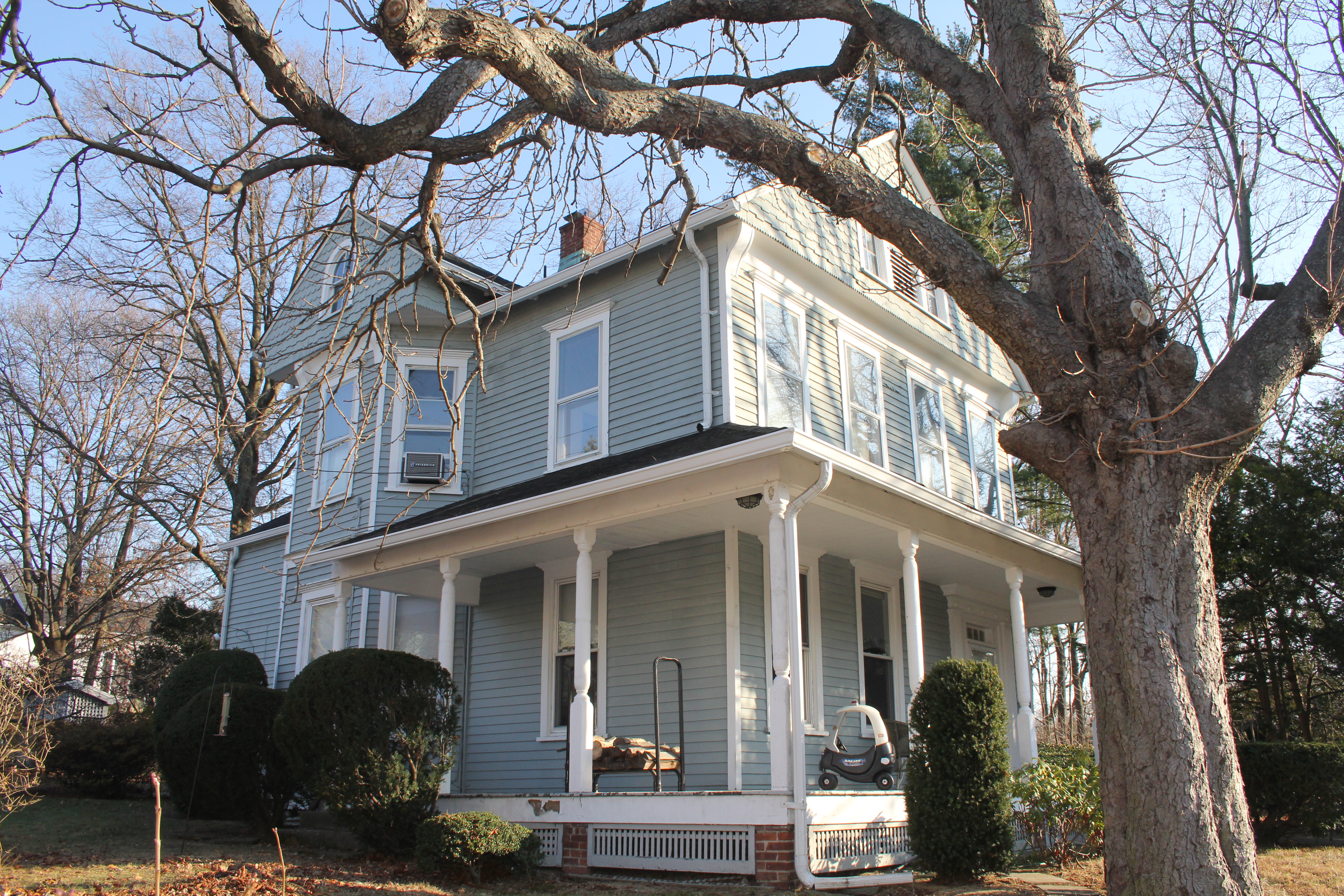
The Zion Episcopal Church rectory, built 1890 and located on the church grounds.

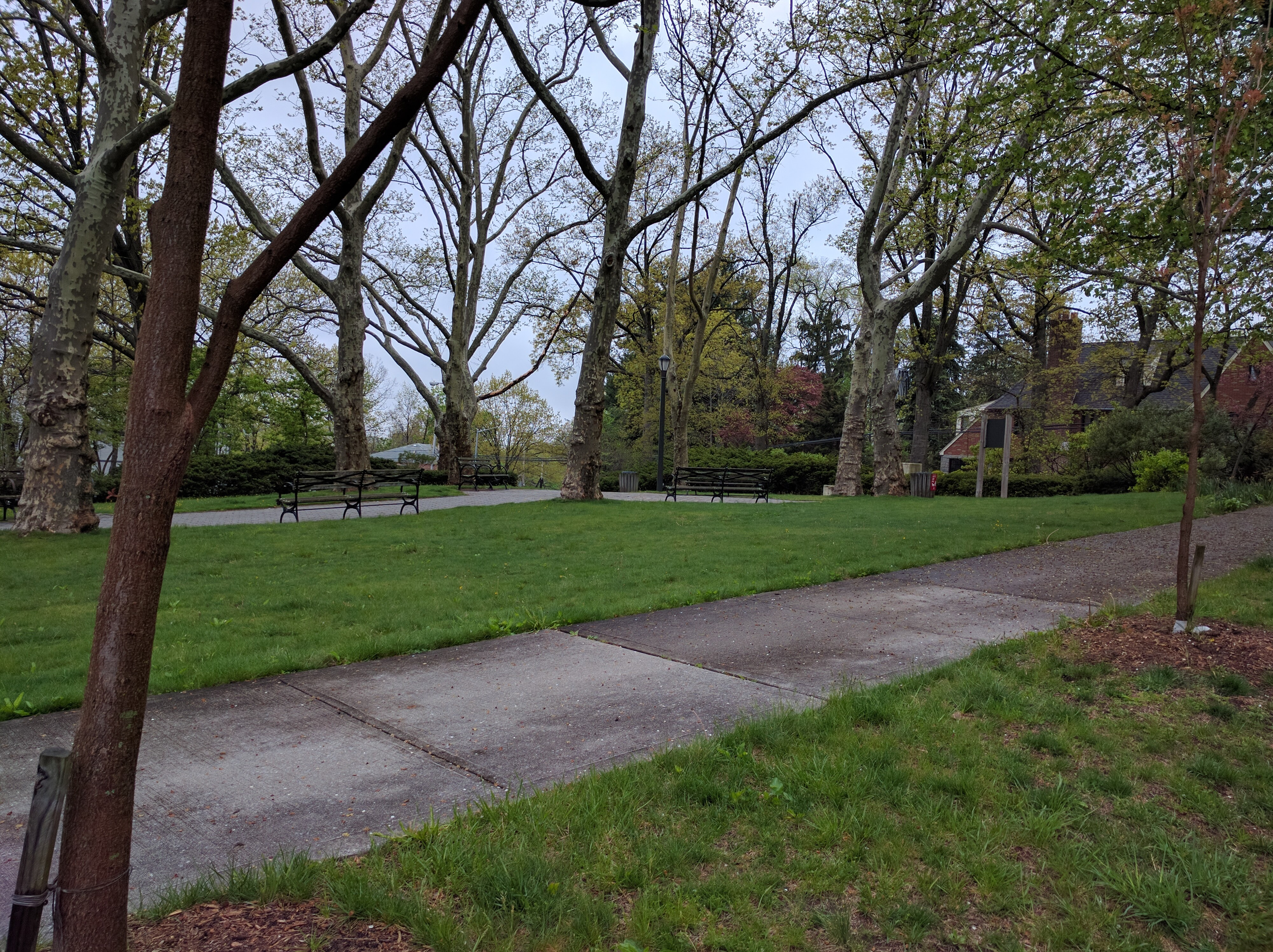
Catherine Turner Richardson Park, Douglaston Hill Historical District, Queens, NY
