= Cornelius Van Wyck House =

Historic house in Queens, New York

- U.S. National Register of Historic Places
- New York City Landmark
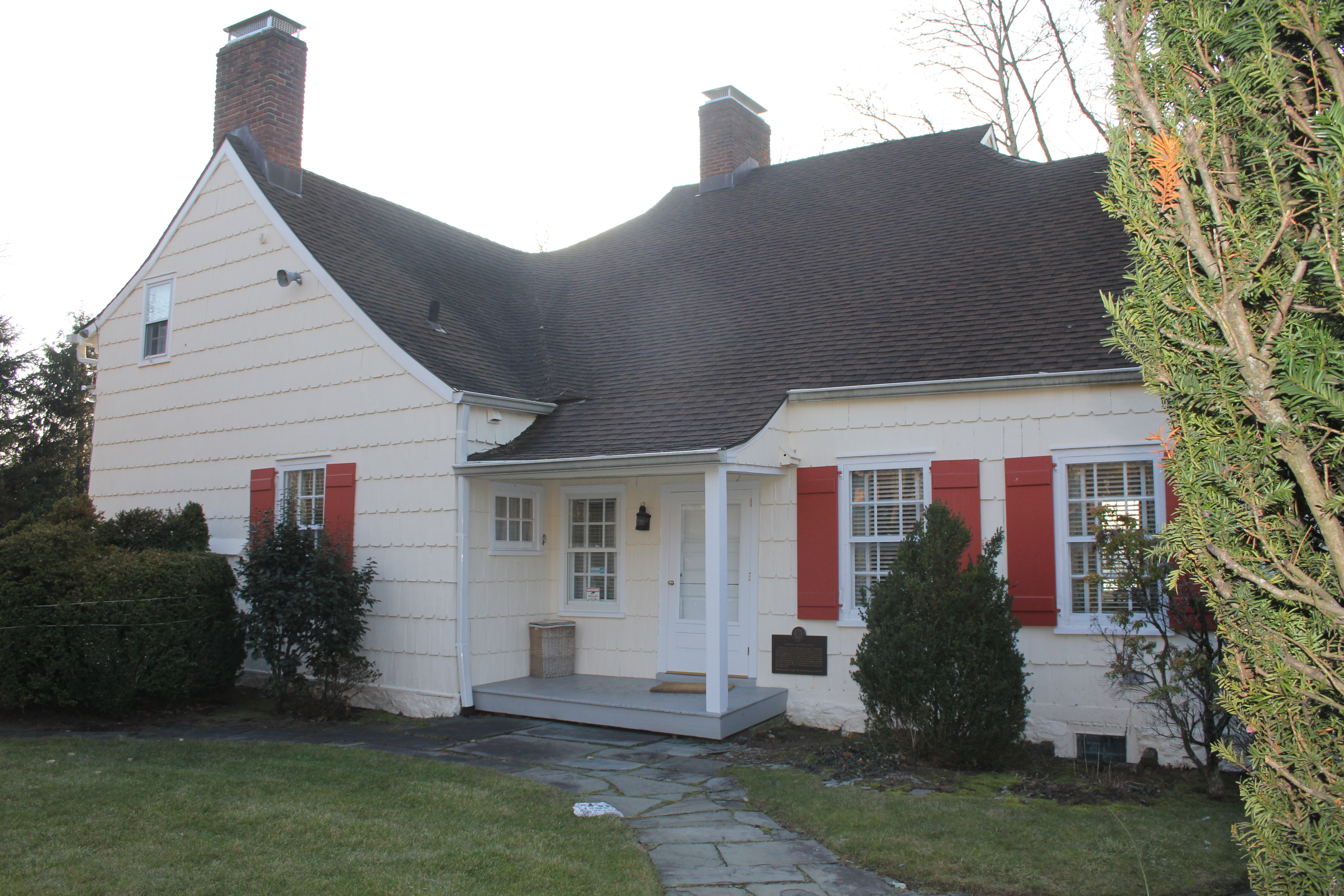
- The house dates to 1735.
- Location: 126 West Dr., Douglas Manor, Queens, New York 11363
- Coordinates: 40°46′23.8″N 73°45′9.0″W
- Area: less than one acre
- Built: 1735
- Architectural style: Dutch Colonial
- NRHP reference No.: 83004149
- NYCL No.: 0144

Significant dates
- Added to NRHP: October 6, 1983
- Designated NYCL: April 19, 1966

The Cornelius Van Wyck House is an 18th-century Dutch Colonial home located on the shore of Little Neck Bay in the Douglaston section of Queens in New York City. The house overlooks Little Neck Bay and is well known for both its age and architecture, and especially for its original owners. It was designated as a landmark by the New York City Landmarks Preservation Commission in 1966 and added to the National Register of Historic Places in 1983. The Cornelius Van Wyck House is considered to be the "most impressive architectural remnant of the early Dutch Culture" in New York.

== History ==
The history of the Cornelius Van Wyck estate predates the construction of the Van Wyck house. Cornelius Van Wyck's father, Johannes Van Wyck, purchased 125 acres of land from Richard and Sarah Cornell. This property was inherited by Cornelius when his father died in 1734.

The house was originally constructed in 1735 by Cornelius Van Wyck, a third-generation American. Cornelius and his wife Mary Hicks added to their original farm and lived in the house until his death. Upon his death, the house passed to his son Stephen Van Wyck, who built additions to the house. However, Stephen, the eldest of Cornelius' 3 sons, showed no interest in farming; therefore, he sold his share of the inheritance to his cousin Cornelius, who was the last Van Wyck to live in the home.

In 1819, possession of the home left the Van Wyck family when it was sold to Winant Van Zandt. Van Zandt, who was wealthy, had purchased 120 acres of adjoining land to the north (referred to as the "Point" area of Douglas Manor). In 1819, Van Zandt constructed a large mansion on the Point. Upon George Van Zandt's death, his son William inherited the property. During the tenure years in which the Douglas family owned the Cornelius Van Wyck House, the estate was used as a guest house and was sometimes rented to friends.

The original Cornelius Van Wyck House, according to a news article, became a "gate house" and led to the larger mansion, which later became The Douglaston Club. William Douglas sold the entire tract in 1906 to the Douglaston Club. The smaller house was purchased by Edward Wicht in 1915; Wicht restored the structure to its original condition and furnished it in keeping with the design and architecture of the previous structure. When Wicht died in 1936, Mr. and Mrs. Larsen purchased the house. Mrs. Larsen showed interest in the history of the homestead. This family also worked to maintain the house and furnish it as it was originally designed and built.

== Description ==
According to the Landmarks Preservation Commission the Cornelius Van Wyck House was described as a "picturesque Eighteenth Century Dutch colonial house," which included hand-hewn shingles and a salt-box type roof. The landscape in which the house is situated leads down through a garden to a sandy beach. The dining room, master bedroom, and living hall contain superb oak beams. The present living room and the downstairs bedroom each contain handsome Georgian mantle-pieces.

The Van Wyck House, according to the article "History of Van Wyck House Outlined for Museum Group," is described very uniquely. Mrs. C. Turner Richardson described the history and significance of this house to 60 members of the Museums Group of the Women's Club of Douglaston during a meeting in the same house in 1950. By 1770, the house had expanded to add more rooms, and in 1930 the house expanded again to include room for a new kitchen. The House is a 2-story structure with five bedrooms and a bath on the first-floor, and three bedrooms and two baths on the second-floor. The notable architectural features of the house include its salt-box roof, oak beams, and wooden shingles. It is one of the last remaining Dutch Colonial houses in New York City.

== See also ==
- List of New York City Designated Landmarks in Queens
- National Register of Historic Places listings in Queens County, New York
- Douglaston Manor Windmill, NY
