= Douglaston Park =

Public park in Queens, New York

Douglaston Park Golf Course
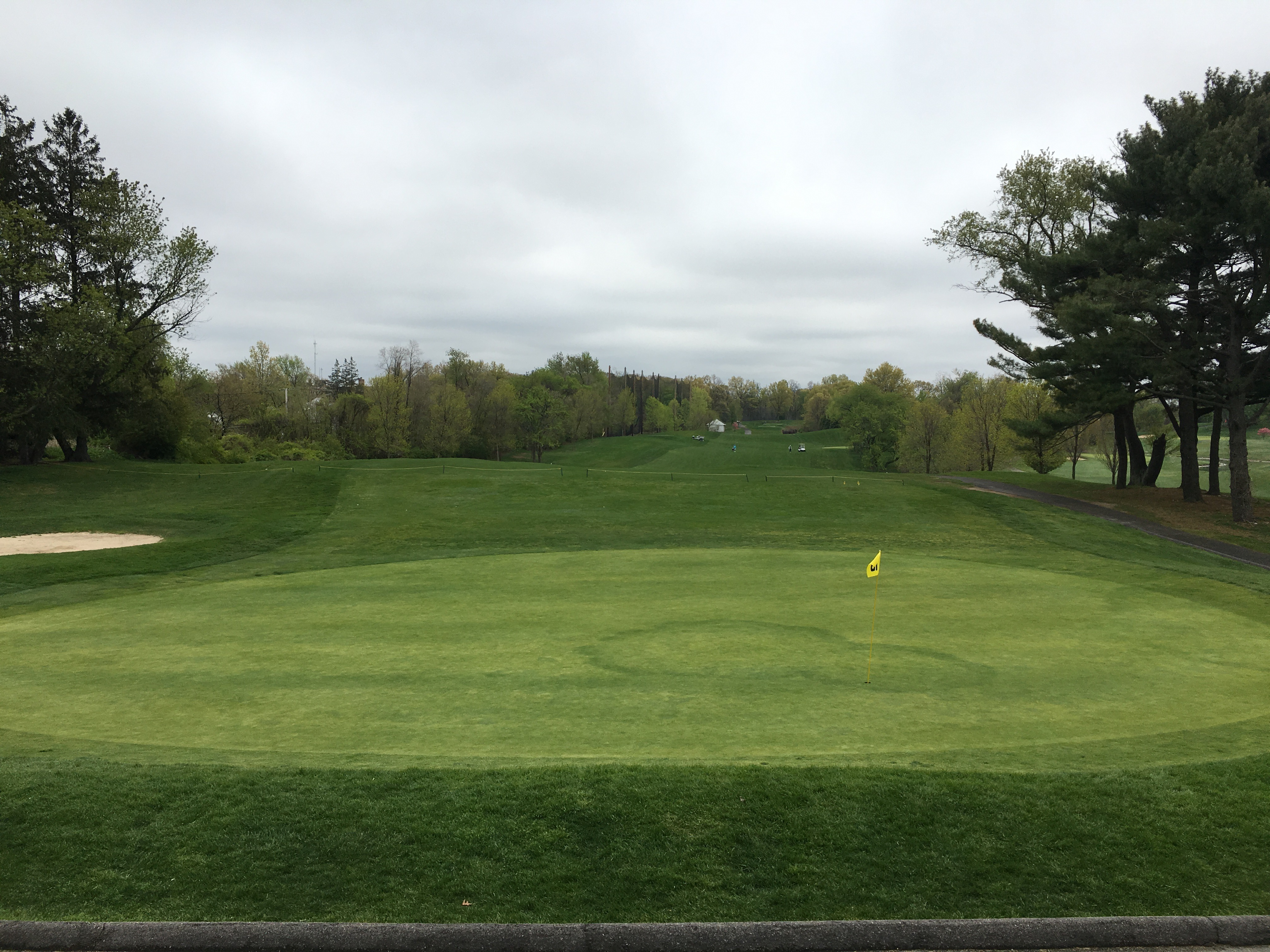

- Location within New York City
- 40°45′09″N 73°43′57″W

Club information
- Location: Douglaston, Queens, New York City, New York, USA
- Established: 1927
- Type: Public
- Tota holes: 18
- Website: www.golfnyc.com

Douglaston Park Golf Course
- Par: 67
- Length: 5,469 yards
- Course rating: 65.5
- Course record: 58 by Greg Mazerolle- 2019 Quinnie Cup (5/19/2019)

Douglaston Park is a public park located in the Douglaston section of Queens, New York City. It contains a golf course named Douglaston Park Golf Course.

According to The New York Times it is also the name of the surrounding residential area, one of five other distinct subsections of Douglaston. More specifically, the Douglaston Park neighborhood is the area located between Northern Boulevard and Interstate 495 (I-495, also known as the Long Island Expressway/LIE).

== Douglaston Park Golf Course ==
The country club's clubhouse, known as Douglaston Manor, is an elaborate Spanish/Mission revival structure, designed by architect Clifford C. Wendehack. The front entrance and sole parking lot at the club is available at the north end of Commonwealth Boulevard and the intersection with Marathon Parkway. It is the former location of the North Hills Country Club.

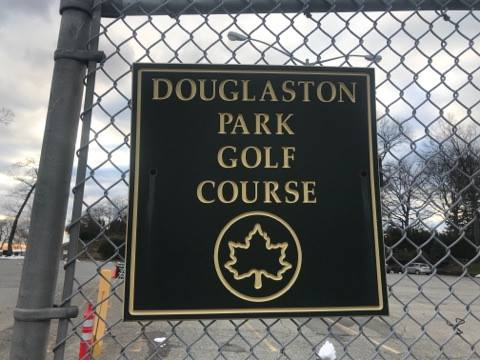
Sign at the entrance of the course

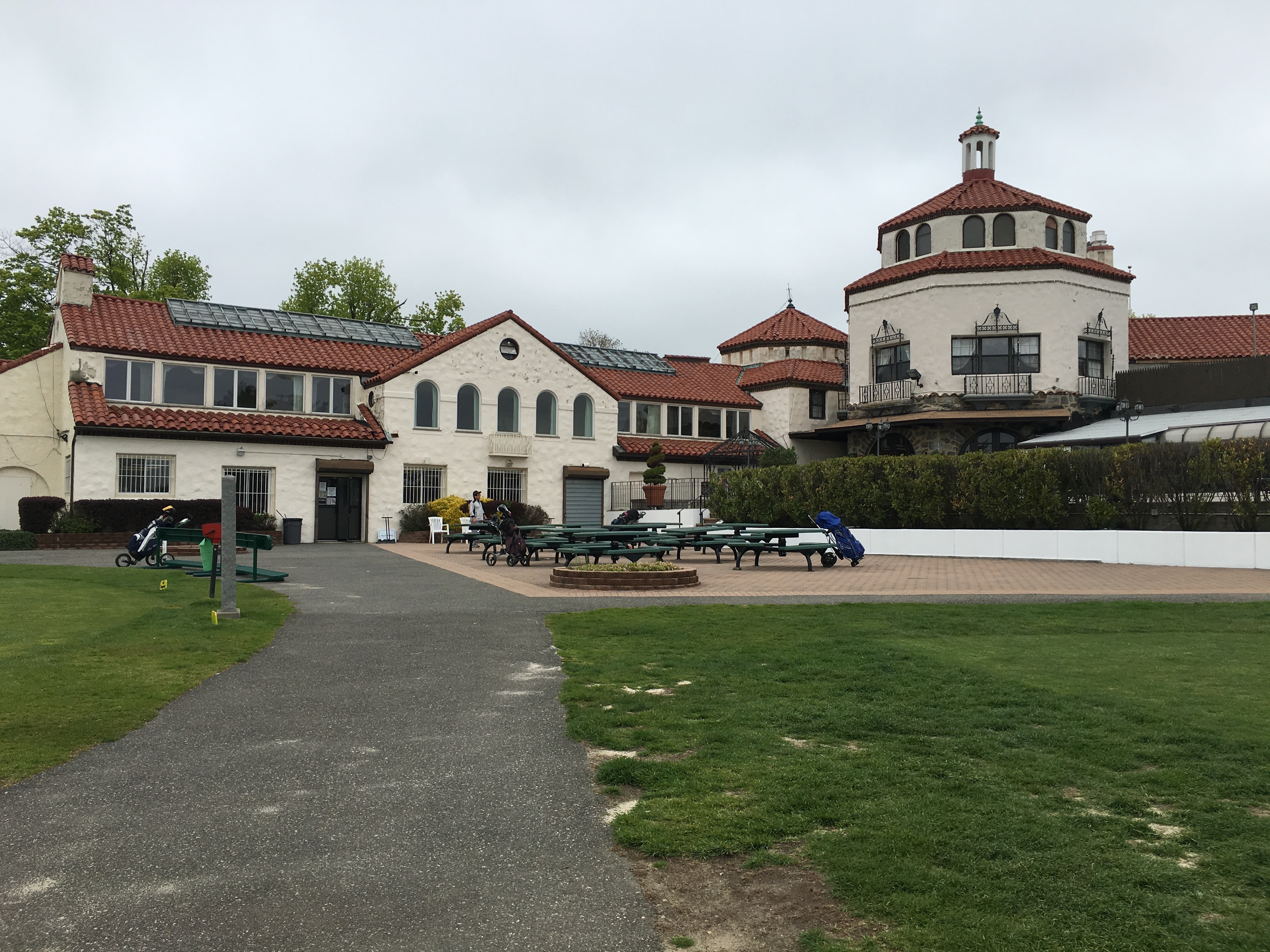
Douglaston Manor Clubhouse

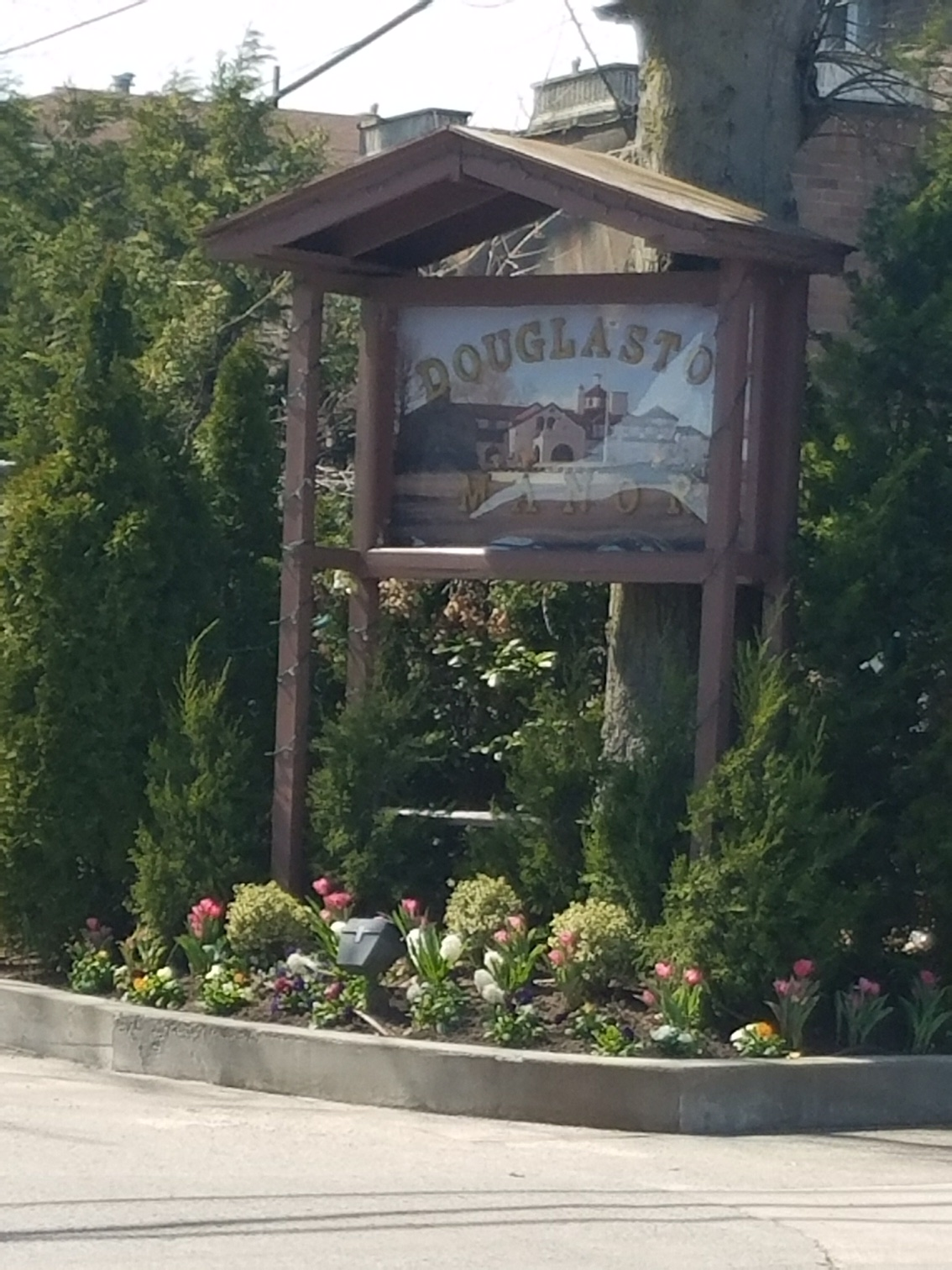
Douglaston Manor entrance sign
