= Douglaston Historic District =

Historic district in Queens, New York

- U.S. National Register of Historic Places
- U.S. Historic district
- New York City Landmark
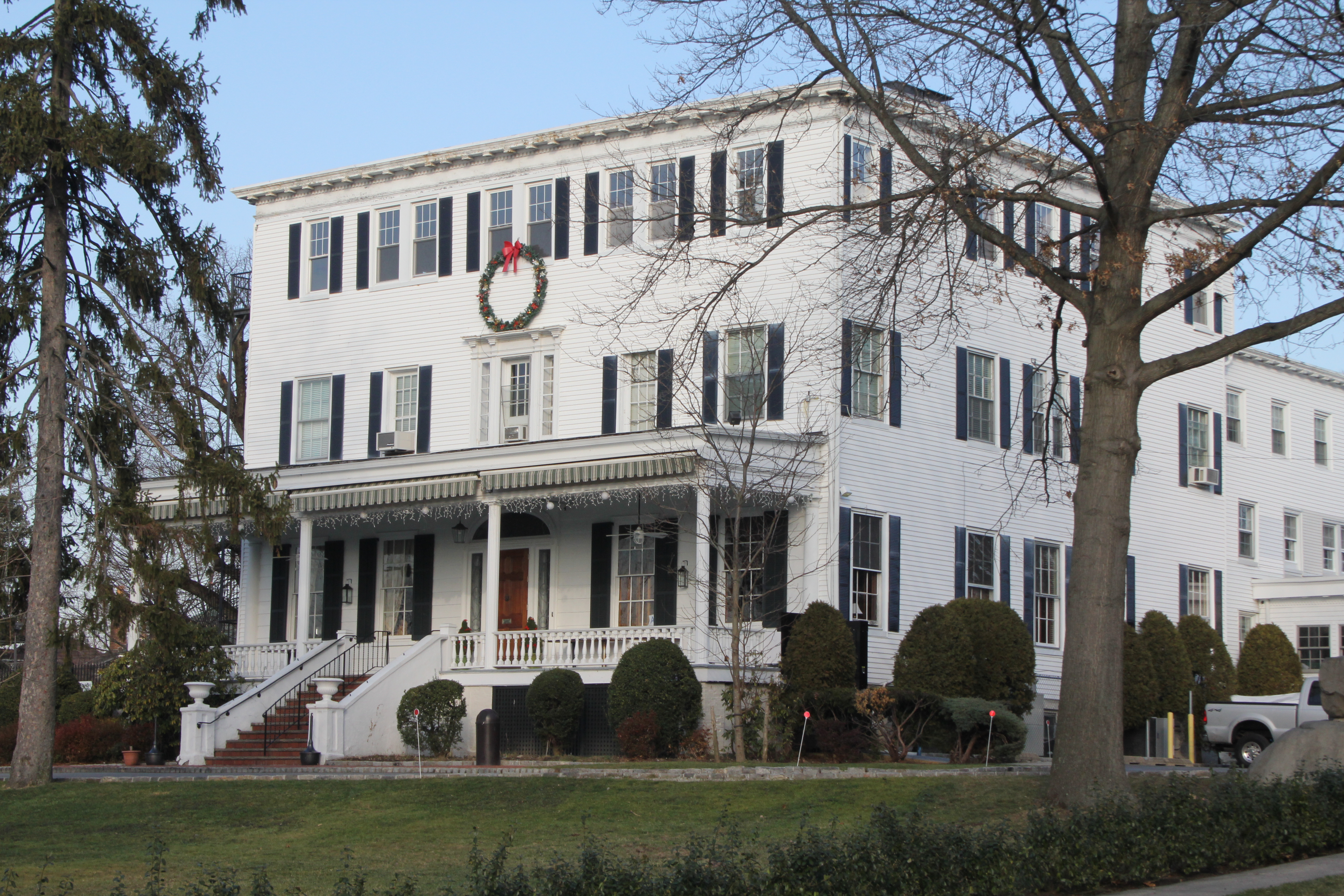
- The Douglaston Club, built c. 1819
- Location: Roughly bounded by Shore Rd., Marinette St., Douglas Rd. and Cherry St., Douglaston, New York
- Coordinates: 40°46′33″N 73°45′2″W
- Area: 197 acres (80 ha)
- Architect: various
- Architectural style: Late 19th and 20th Century Revivals, Late 19th and Early 20th Century American Movements
- NRHP reference No.: 05000937
- NYCL No.: 1957

Significant dates
- Added to NRHP: September 1, 2005
- Designated NYCL: June 24, 1997

Douglaston Historic District is a national historic district in Douglaston, Queens, New York. It includes 631 contributing buildings and three contributing sites on a mile-long peninsula extending into Little Neck Bay. All but one of the buildings are in residential use and the majority were built in the early- to mid-20th century as a planned suburban community known as Douglas Manor. In the early 20th century, the Rickert-Finlay Realty Company of Manhattan purchased 175 acres (0.71 km^{2}) of the Douglas' family holdings, and formed the Douglas Manor Association, creating a planned community. Many of the houses in this area were built in architectural styles popular at the time, such as Tudor, Mediterranean, Colonial Revival, and Arts and Crafts. Located within the district are the separately listed Cornelius Van Wyck House (c. 1735) and Allen-Beville House (c. 1848-1850). Another notable early building is the Van Zandt manor house (c. 1819), which is now the Douglaston Club.

It was listed on the National Register of Historic Places in 2005. In 1997, New York City's Landmarks Preservation Commission designated Douglas Manor as the Douglaston Historic District, ensuring that no new buildings or external alterations could be made without the commission's approval.

== Gallery ==
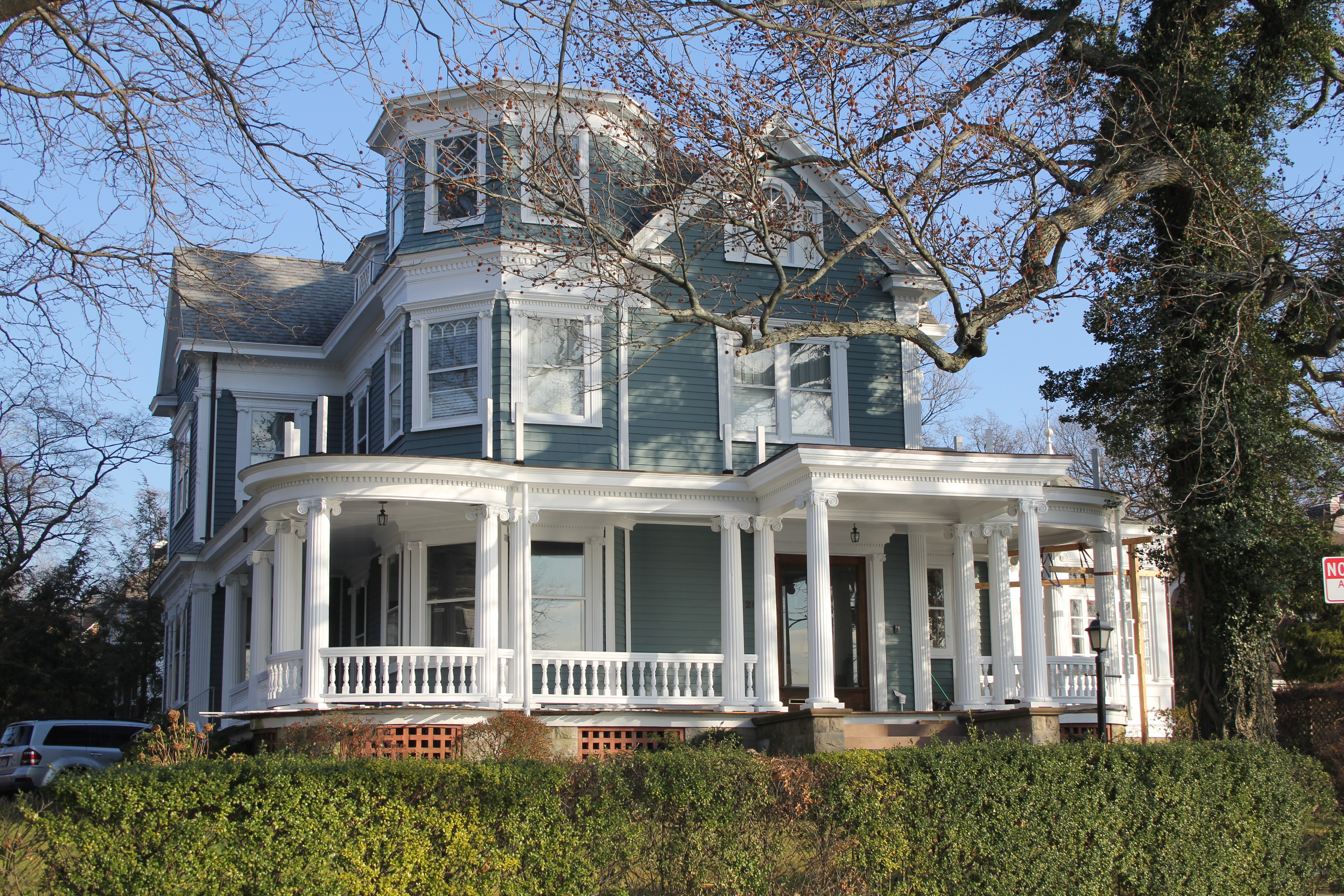
A house in the district in the Victorian style.

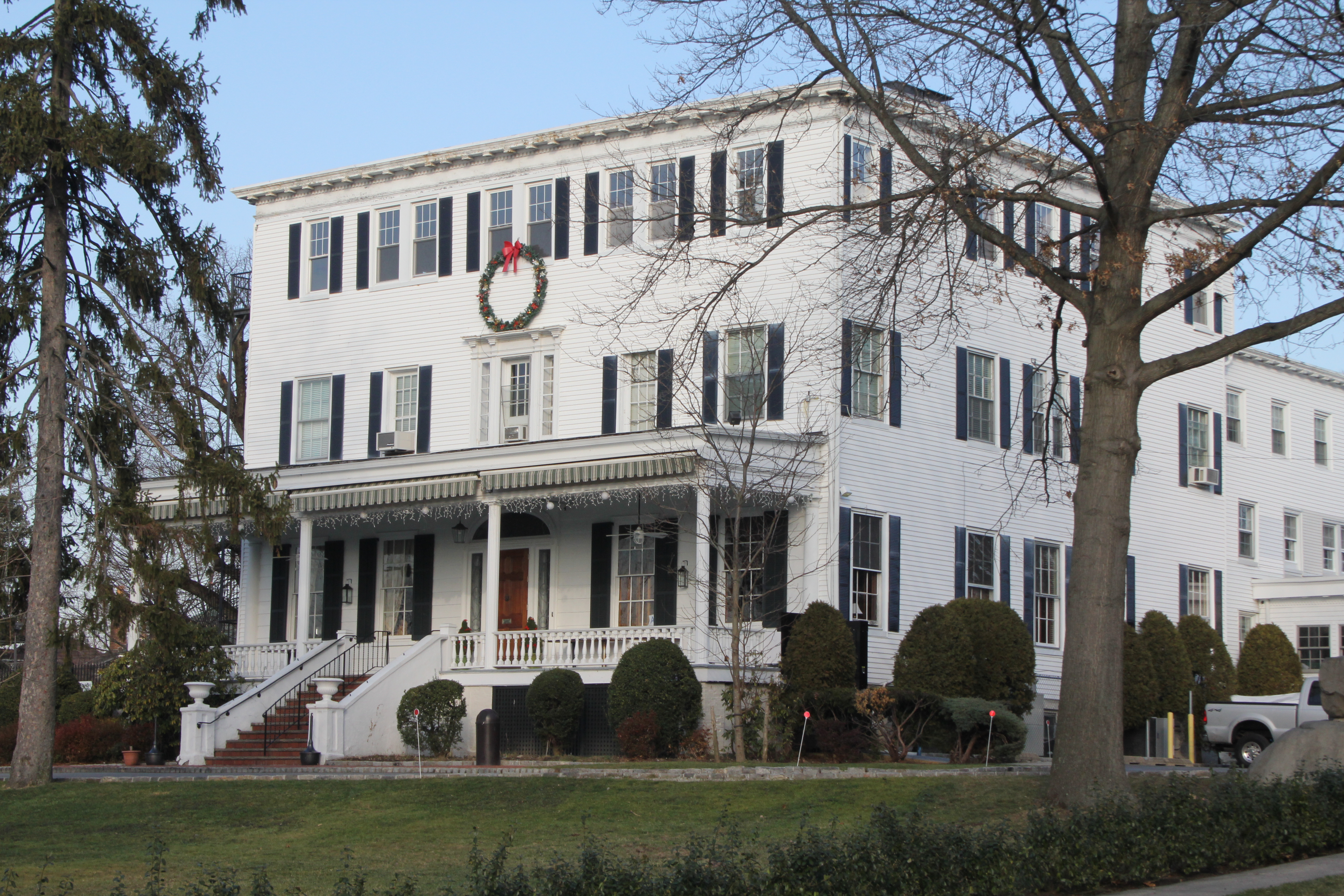
The Douglaston Club, built c. 1819 as the Van Zandt manor house and expanded in the early 1900s to serve as a private club.
