= TimesLedger Newspapers =

Newspaper chain

The TimesLedger Newspapers is a chain of paid circulation weekly newspapers covering news, sports and events of concern to residents of the borough of Queens, New York. The company's flagship paper is the Bayside Times, which was founded in 1935 as the paper of record for Bayside, New York, where its offices are presently based. The newspapers are owned by Schneps Media.

== History ==
Schneps Media was founded in 1985.

NewsCorp acquired the TimesLedger in 2008. In 2014, News Corp sold its Community Newspaper Group to Les Goodstein, the former company executive, and to his wife Jennifer. Schneps Media acquired Community News Group in September 2018.

Editions currently published by the paper include the Bayside Times and the Flushing Times, which cover northeast Queens, and the TimesLedger, which covers western and southern Queens.

TimesLedger won six New York Press Awards in 2009 and 13 New York Press Association Awards in 2010.
