= North Hills Country Club =

Country club in North Hills, New York

Coordinates: 40°46′33″N 73°40′52″W

- Interactive map of North Hills Country Club

Club information
- Established: 1927 (original); 1961 (current)
- Type: Private
- Website: www.northhillscc.com

North Hills Country Club is a private country club located within the Incorporated Village of North Hills, in Nassau County, on the North Shore of Long Island, in New York, United States.

== History ==
The club was founded in 1927 at the current location of Douglaston Park.

The golf course relocated to North Hills in 1961. This new course was designed by Robert Trent Jones.

== See also ==
- List of golf courses designed by Robert Trent Jones
- Deepdale Golf Club
- Fresh Meadow Country Club
