= Allen-Beville House =

Historic house in Queens, New York

- U.S. National Register of Historic Places
- New York City Landmark
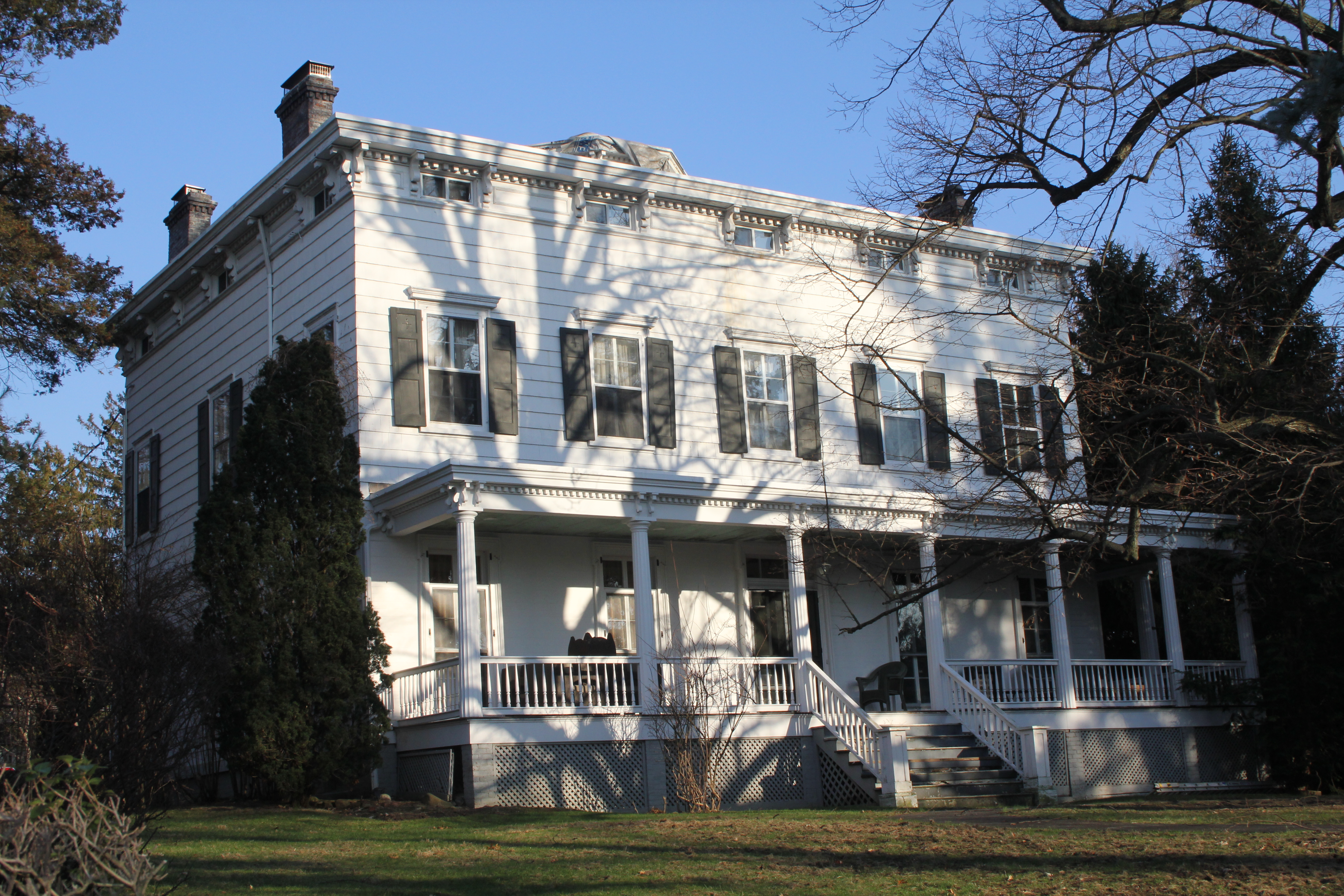
- The Allen-Beville house is one of the few surviving 19th century farmhouses in Queens.

- Location within New York City Location within New York Location within the United States
- Location: 29 Center Drive, Douglaston, Queens, New York
- Coordinates: 40°46′22″N 73°45′3″W
- Built: 1848-1850
- Architectural style: Italianate
- NRHP reference No.: 83001760

Significant dates
- Added to NRHP: September 9, 1983
- Designated NYCL: January 11, 1977

The Allen-Beville House is a historic house on the Little Neck peninsula in the Douglaston neighborhood of Queens, New York City. Constructed between 1848 and 1850, it is one of the few surviving 19th-century structures in Queens built as a farmhouse that survives.

The site was inherited by Daniel K. Allen from his uncle, Richard Allen. Originally a farm of 16 acres (65,000 m^{2}), he had purchased the land from Elijah Allen, Philip Allen and Cornelius Van Wyck prior to 1820. In 1847, Benjamin Allen acquired the site and built the house.

In the late 19th century, William P. Douglas, for whom Douglaston was named, purchased the home for use as a guest home for his estate, which was the original Douglaston Club building. When the clubhouse burned in 1917, the architects used this house as a model to create the current club.

In 1905-06 the Douglas Manor Company bought the Douglas Estate and subdivided the land as a real estate development.

The Allen-Beville House was given landmark status by the New York City Landmarks Preservation Commission in 1977 and was added to the National Register of Historic Places in 1983.

== See also ==
- List of New York City Designated Landmarks in Queens
- National Register of Historic Places listings in Queens County, New York
