= Austin Street =

Street in Queens, New York City

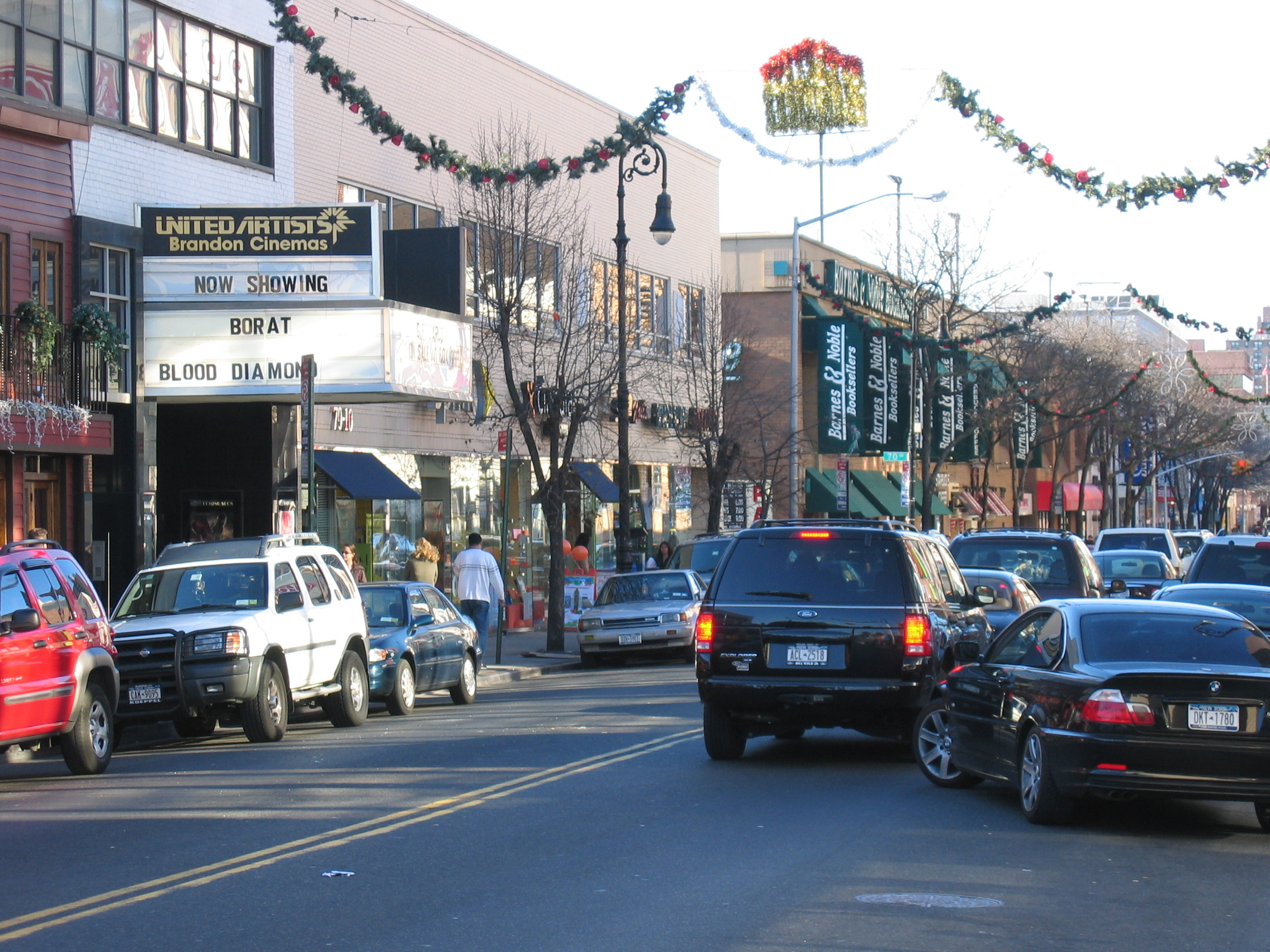
- A corridor of commercial located on Austin Street, Forest Hills
- Owner: City of New York
- Maintained by: NYCDOT
- Location: Rego Park – Kew Gardens, Queens, New York
- West end: Eliot Avenue in Rego Park
- Major junctions: 63rd Drive in Rego Park Yellowstone Boulevard in Forest Hills; 71st (Continental) Avenue in Forest Hills; Ascan Avenue in Forest Hills; Union Turnpike in Kew Gardens Lefferts Boulevard in Kew Gardens
- East end: 127th Street in Kew Gardens

Austin Street is an east–west street in Queens, New York, United States that runs from Eliot Avenue in Rego Park to 127th Street in Kew Gardens. It originally began as a small, quiet, residential lane, but quickly grew into the commercial center of Forest Hills. The three-quarters of a mile stretch from Yellowstone Boulevard and Ascan Avenue holds several commercial shops. It is named after Austin Corbin, a 19th-century Long Island Rail Road (LIRR) president.

== Route description ==
Austin Street parallels the LIRR tracks for much of its length and passes through Forest Hills, where the commercial corridor between Yellowstone Boulevard and Ascan Avenue serves as the neighborhood's shopping and cultural heart.

Austin Street begins at Eliot Avenue, near a junction with Woodhaven Boulevard, heading east-southeast. Major intersections along the street include 63rd Drive in Rego Park, Yellowstone Boulevard, 71st/Continental Avenue near the Forest Hills LIRR station, and Ascan Avenue, in Forest Hills.

East of Ascan Avenue, Austin Street continues southeast toward Kew Gardens. Austin Street underpasses Union Turnpike, where it briefly splits into multiple lanes, then Lefferts Boulevard near the Kew Gardens LIRR Station, before ending at 127th Street near Metropolitan Avenue.

== History ==
=== 1900s–1920s: Residential development ===
The first part of Austin Street, from Whitepot Road (now Yellowstone Boulevard) to Union Avenue (now Union Turnpike), was built c. 1906–1907. In 1907, a grocery and butcher shop opened on Austin Street.

By the late 1920s, settlers from nearby towns had moved in, and residential buildings were built on Austin Street. Around 1925, Austin Street was expanded east towards Kew Gardens. Perpendicular streets intersecting Austin Street were ordered alphabetically, going west, starting with Iris Place (84th Road) to Quentin Street (80th Road). Past Union Turnpike, perpendicular streets were named as well, but had no specific order. Lefferts Boulevard (previously Avenue) and Mowbray Drive stuck around, while a tiny portion of Onslow Place (82nd Avenue) south of Grenfell Street kept its name as well.

=== 1930s–1960s: New subway and commercial corridor ===
In the 1930s, the front entrance of Kew Forest School (built in 1918) had to be redesigned due to the new Interborough (later Jackie Robinson) Parkway. The school was on Union Turnpike in between Austin Street and Kew Forest Lane.

In 1936, the IND Queens Boulevard Line was extended to Forest Hills at 71st (Continental) Avenue. The new subway allowed for major development and led to commercial expansion. By the 1940s, most of the street's houses in the stretch from Yellowstone Boulevard to Ascan Avenue were torn down and replaced with commercial.

By the late 50s and 60s, Austin Street had become home to the main commercial corridor of Forest Hills. Plenty of shops stood right where residential buildings were years prior, such as the Austin Book Shop, which was opened in April 1954 on Austin Street, in between Mowbray Drive and Lefferts Boulevard, by Bernard Titowsky.

=== 1970s–2000s: Commercial expansion and cultural change ===
In the 1970s, the traditional four-block corridor from 70th Road to Ascan Avenue started expanding west towards Yellowstone Boulevard. A new wave of residents came into Forest Hills from several different countries, allowing for new culture and cuisine in shops and restaurants. The Austin Book Shop that was opened thirty years prior moved to Jamaica Avenue in 1984.

By 1998, the commercial strip was being compared to Madison Avenue given how busy it was. By the early 2000s, the commercial corridor was still expanding, with new stores moving in and out now and then.

=== 2010s-now: Parking and pedestrian safety concerns ===
By the 2010s, the Austin Street commercial area had grown so much that there were concerns about pedestrian safety. NYCDOT announced that the intersection of Yellowstone Boulevard and Austin Street would be getting a make-over in 2017 due to the 16 accidents that occurred between the four years of 2010 and 2014.

By 2018, the commercial industry had grown so much that there was nowhere to park during rush hour, and pedestrian conditions were very unsafe. NYPD Open Data reported 71 crashes on Austin Street between Yellowstone Boulevard and Ascan Avenue from January 2018 to November 2022, while Crash Mapper reported 356 crashes.

NYCDOT surveyed the public and business owners on how they felt about Austin Street. The DOT then announced that they were going to change parking areas and added several crosswalks throughout Austin Street on April 11, 2018. They implemented the changes sometime in Spring 2018.

Several community members signed a petition to make Austin Street more pedestrian-friendly. Pedro Rodriguez, who moved from Astoria to Forest Hills in 2019, created the petition to pedestrianize Austin Street. As of March 2, 2023, the petition had 277 handwritten signatures and 390 digital signatures.

As of January 16, 2024, there were traffic lights that had been installed on Austin Street at the intersections of Yellowstone Boulevard, 69th Road, 70th Avenue, 70th Road, 71st/Continental Avenue, and Ascan Avenue.

On October 23, 2025, NYCDOT announced a new Citi Bike expansion to Forest Hills, which would add 2 to 4 stations on Austin Street:

- 63rd Drive & Austin Street
- Austin Street & 66th Avenue*
- Austin Street & 70th Road*
- Austin Street & 76th Avenue

*These stations are listed on Citi Bike's map as "coming soon"; however, they were not listed in the NYCDOT announcement.

== Transportation ==
Austin Street serves several bus, subway, and train lines.

It is served by the New York City Subway's IND Queens Boulevard Line (E, F, <F>, M, and R trains) at 71st/Continental Avenue and Queens Boulevard. Though it may not directly run on Austin Street, it is within one block of the street.

It is also served by the following bus routes: Q10, Q37, Q38, Q80 and QM18. Services for the Q23, QM12 and QM42 were discontinued in the Queens bus network redesign on June 29, 2025, for the Q23, and on June 30, 2025, for the QM buses, respectively, to remove congestion from Austin Street and improve speed and reliability.

Austin Street is also served by the Forest Hills and Kew Gardens stations of the Long Island Rail Road.

There is also a pedestrian overpass, called Plaza 67, which also includes a park. It was originally called the Austin Street Sitting Area, named after Austin Street. In 1998, Henry Stern renamed the park to Plaza 67 for its cross street, 67th Avenue. In 1999, Karen Koslowitz contributed $150,000 for the reconstruction of Plaza 67. New improvements included renovating play equipment, fences, pavements, and general sitework. During some time between July 17, 2013, and February 11, 2015, Plaza 67 was closed for an unknown reason.

Austin Street will also be served by Citi Bike by December 2026.

== Notable buildings and events ==
JHS 190 Russell Sage is a school on Austin Street, as is the aforementioned Kew Forest School. Ehrenreich-Austin Playground is a park on Austin Street, which is named after Leo Ehrenreich. It is bounded by the intersections of Austin Street and 76th Avenue and Drive. Eight Oaks Triangle is a tiny triangular park formed by the intersections of Austin Street with 84th Drive and 125th Street, as well as their own intersection. There are eight eponymous oak trees, as well as six benches located within the park's boundaries.

The Forest Hills Festival takes place on Austin Street every year on June 11 from 10 AM to 6 PM. Diverse foods and high-quality merchandise is sold between 69th and 72nd Roads.

The first "Austin Day" was held on September 20, 2025, by Neighbors for A Safer Austin Street.
