= Kew Gardens station (LIRR) =

Long Island Rail Road station in Queens, New York

Kew Gardens
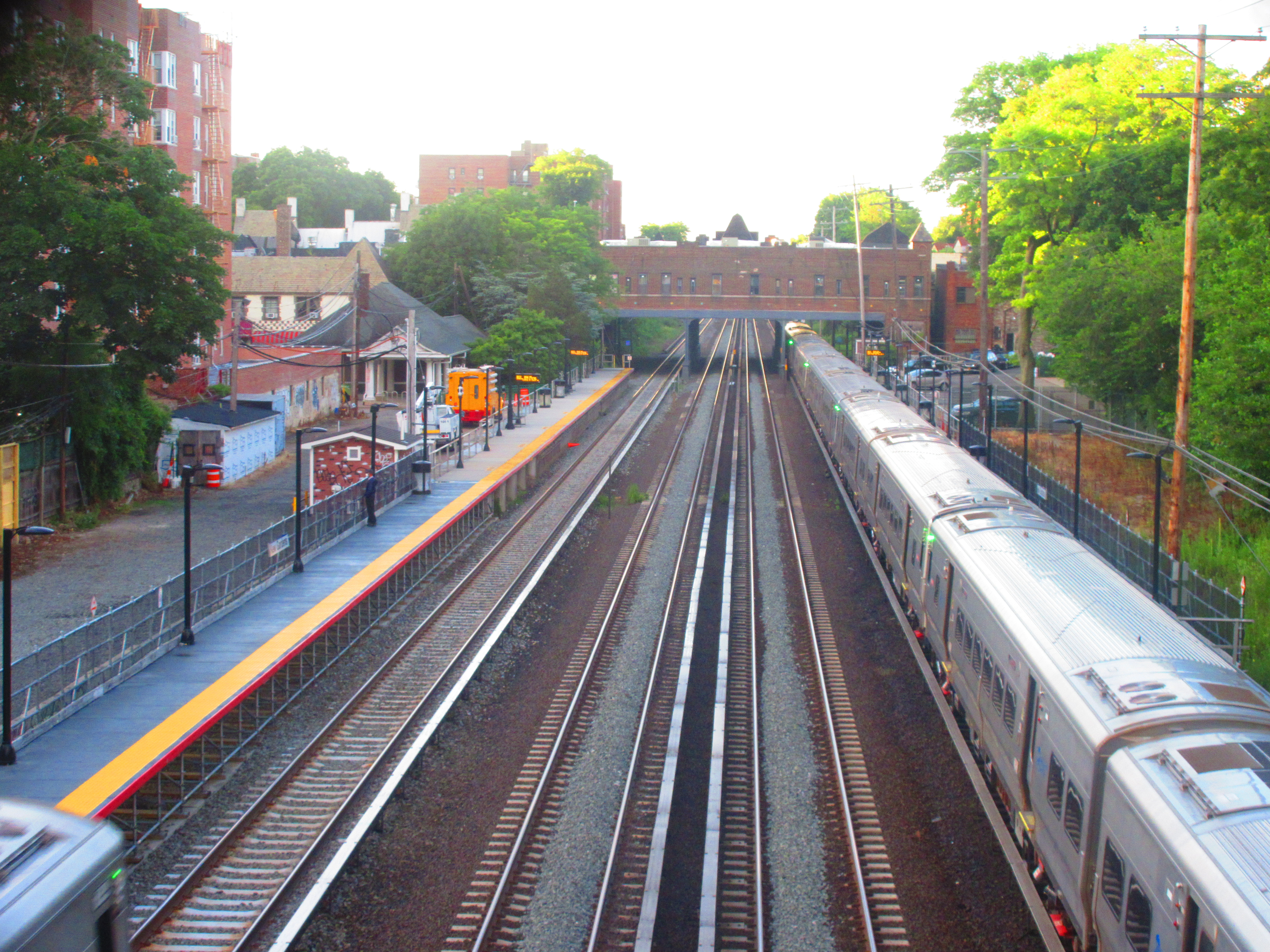
- The Kew Gardens station and the Lefferts Boulevard Bridge, as seen from 82nd Avenue in 2020

General information
- Location: Austin Street and Lefferts Boulevard; Kew Gardens, Queens, New York
- Coordinates: 40.7096°N 73.83066°W
- Owner: Long Island Rail Road
- Line: Main Line
- Distance: 7.7 mi (12.4 km) from Long Island City
- Platforms: 2 side platforms
- Tracks: 4
- Connections: New York City Subway: at Kew Gardens-Union Turnpike; MTA & NYCT Bus: Q10, Q37, Q45, Q46, Q48, Q80, QM18, QM63, QM64, QM65, QM68 (Q37 at 80th Road and Austin Street)

Construction
- Parking: Yes
- Cycle facilities: Bike racks (westbound platform)
- Accessible: ADA Accessible-Yes 2 Ramps are present at Kew Gardens, one for each platform.

Other information
- Station code: KGN
- Fare zone: 1

History
- Opened: 1879, 1883
- Closed: 1882, 1909
- Rebuilt: September 8, 1910
- Electrified: June 23, 1910; 750 V (DC) third rail
- Former names: Maple Grove (1879–1910); Kew (1910–1912)

Passengers
- 2017: 1,778 (Daily)

Services
Preceding station	Long Island Rail Road	Following station
Forest Hills toward Penn Station or Grand Central	Hempstead Branch Evening Hours Only	Jamaica toward Hempstead
Forest Hills toward Penn Station or Grand Central	Ronkonkoma Branch Peak periods only	Jamaica toward Ronkonkoma
Forest Hills toward Penn Station or Grand Central	Far Rockaway Branch Peak periods only	Jamaica toward Far Rockaway
Forest Hills toward Penn Station or Grand Central	Babylon Branch Peak periods only	Jamaica toward Babylon
Forest Hills toward Penn Station or Grand Central	West Hempstead Branch Peak periods only	Jamaica toward West Hempstead
Forest Hills toward Penn Station or Grand Central	Long Beach Branch Peak periods only	Jamaica toward Long Beach
Woodside toward Penn Station or Grand Central	Port Jefferson Branch	Jamaica toward Huntington
Oyster Bay Branch does not stop here
Montauk Branch does not stop here
Former services
Preceding station	Long Island Rail Road	Following station
Forest Hills toward Long Island City or Penn Station	Main Line	Westbridge toward Greenport
Location

The Kew Gardens station is a station on the Main Line of the Long Island Rail Road (LIRR). It is located in the Kew Gardens neighborhood of Queens, New York City, near Austin Street and Lefferts Boulevard. The station is located within the City Terminal Zone, part of LIRR fare zone 1. It contains four tracks and two side platforms for the outermost tracks.

The Kew Gardens station was built on the site of a station named Hopedale, which operated from 1875 to 1884 and served the Maple Grove Cemetery nearby. Another station named Maple Grove was built even closer to the cemetery in 1879. The station closed in 1909 as the LIRR was rerouted onto a more direct alignment with the construction of the Maple Grove Cut-Off. Maple Grove was replaced by the current Kew Gardens station in 1910. The station's opening played an integral part in the construction of the community of Kew Gardens. The Kew Gardens train crash took place east of the station on November 22, 1950, which killed 78 people and injured 363 others in the worst crash in the LIRR's history.

One of the Kew Gardens station's unique features is the Lefferts Boulevard Bridge, which has one story commercial buildings on both sides for local businesses. The stores were built over the tracks in 1930. While the neighborhood's charm has been attributed to the bridge, it has been under threat of demolition multiple times. Since the bridge is deteriorating, the Metropolitan Transportation Authority (MTA), which operates the LIRR, had proposed demolishing the bridge. However, the bridge was saved after local residents and politicians strongly opposed demolition.

== History ==
=== Background ===
The city of Brooklyn banned the LIRR from using steam propulsion within city limits effective July 1, 1851. In early October, the LIRR stopped freight and passenger trains at Jamaica, directing passengers to take Fulton Street stages to Bedford and transfer there to "Jamaica Line" stages. Laws passed on April 19, 1859 allowed for the appointment of commissioners, empowered to contract with the LIRR to close the Cobble Hill Tunnel, cease using steam within city limits, and instead run horse cars for freight and passengers to the city line or East New York, connecting with steam trains to and beyond Jamaica there. By the fall of 1861, both use of steam as propulsion and of the tunnel had ceased.

In order to maintain access to New York, the LIRR chartered the New York and Jamaica Railroad (NY&J) on September 3, 1859, and a supplement to the LIRR's charter passed March 12, 1860 authorized it to buy the NY&J and build a new main line from Jamaica to Hunters Point. The LIRR carried through with the NY&J purchase on April 25, along with the purchase of a short piece of the Brooklyn and Jamaica at Jamaica. The new line to Hunters Point was officially opened on May 9, 1861, with regular service starting May 10, using a portion of the tracks of the Flushing Railroad between Winfield and Hunters Point.

=== Hopedale station ===
The first station in the vicinity of the current Kew Gardens station was known as Hopedale, and was located opposite Hopedale Hall on Union Turnpike to the west of Queens Boulevard in the hamlet with the same name. The station was established in July 1875 along the new main line to Hunters Point to serve the newly opened Maple Grove Cemetery. The station building, whose construction was funded by the people of Richmond Hill and Whitepot (modern-day Forest Hills), was built in October 1875. Trains started stopping here on November 15, 1875, and the station was first listed on the timetable of May 1877 which showed three daily trains going west and one daily train going east. As part of a major refurbishment of the railroad, the rails from Hopedale to Jamaica were replaced in March 1879.

This station was used by passengers going to the nearby Maple Grove Cemetery, until the Maple Grove station, which was only 0.25 miles (0.4 km) away from the cemetery, opened. Due to the opening of the Maple Grove station and the planned construction of a second track, the station was closed by August 28, 1884, and its building was purchased by John Burdett, relocated, and converted into a private residence.

=== Maple Grove station ===
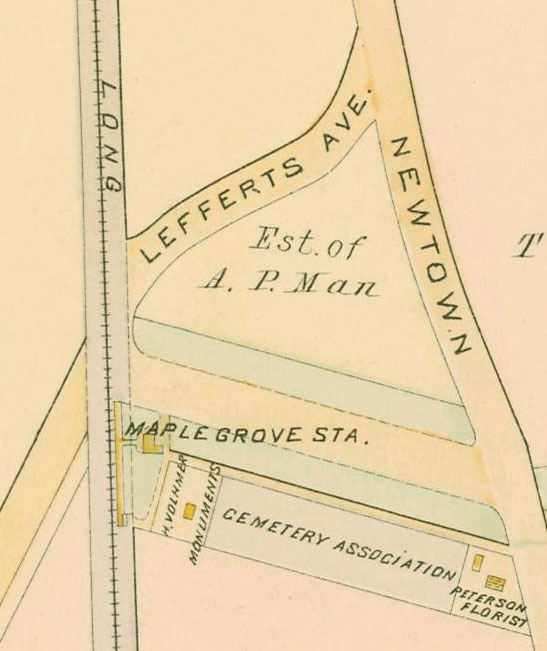
The former Maple Grove Station, 18 years before the LIRR realignment project

In order to better serve Maple Grove Cemetery, a new station was opened at Maple Grove, near the cemetery's western entrance. This station opened in May 1879. The station was a flag stop, with trains only stopping upon request. Funeral trains also served the station, and received special rates. It had low-level platforms located to the rear of where the Mowbray and Kew Gardens Plaza Apartments are located today. The eastbound platform had a station building which was designed by James Ware. To the west of the station, there was a grade crossing with Lefferts Avenue (now Lefferts Boulevard). In summer 1879, a new depot was installed at the station, which opened up to a new western entrance to the cemetery.

On January 1, 1881, Austin Corbin took over the Long Island Rail Road and sought out to install new rails on the Main Line from Winfield Junction to Jamaica. In February 1881, all service on the Main Line was halted, and this station was temporarily abandoned at this time. Starting in April, the old rails were torn up and used on the South Side Railroad of Long Island. The temporary abandonment inconvenienced visitors to the Cemetery, and during this period, the managers of the cemetery made arrangements to have visitors transported free of charge to the Richmond Hill station on the Montauk Division.

The tracks were relaid during September and October 1882, and the line was rebuilt as a double-track line with iron rails. The line was reopened on October 25, 1882 for freight only to allow the Montauk Division to be exclusively used for passenger service. Service resumed on May 30, 1883 with one daily train in each direction after the managers of the cemetery made a request to the directors of the Long Island Rail Road. In 1886, the station was moved 40 feet (12 m) to provide space for a lawn and flowerbed.

After Hopedale station closed in 1884, this was the only station on the Main Line between Winfield and Jamaica, and as of 1897, the line was mostly used for freight, with the exception of some passenger service during commuting hours. In 1888, commutation fares were not offered for the station, the fare to New York was 25 cents, and the station was served by three daily eastbound trains and one daily westbound train. At the time, there were two nearby bridges over roadways spanned by pratt trusses and wood track stringers. While this was originally a single-tracked line, it was double-tracked between 1888 and November 1902. (Note: The line had been single-tracked as evidenced by the source. The image from November 1902 shows that the line had been double-tracked by this point in time.) As part of the construction of the Maple Grove Cut-Off, the station was removed in 1909, and replaced by Kew station in 1910.

=== Maple Grove Cut-Off ===
In order to provide fast service for the opening of the Pennsylvania Railroad's East River Tunnels in 1910, the Long Island Rail Road completely rebuilt the Main Line between Winfield and Jamaica from one track to four tracks, with two additional tracks between the Glendale Cut-Off and Winfield. 40 grade crossings were eliminated as part of the project. In addition, the line was electrified using a third rail. This was expected to reduce the running time between Jamaica and Sunnyside Yard from 18 minutes to 12 minutes.

To speed up service through Kew Gardens, the LIRR undertook the construction of the Maple Grove Cut-Off for $500,000. The Cut-Off shortened the Main Line by 328 feet (100 m), and sped up service with the construction of a new straightened four-track route that ran at a lower grade. The Cut-Off branched from the original line about 400 feet (120 m) north of Ascan Avenue in Forest Hills, and continued to 84th Drive in Kew Gardens, or about 700 feet (210 m) east of Lefferts Avenue. The original line ran straight from Winfield to within a few feet of Queens Boulevard at Lefferts Avenue (now Boulevard) and then curved sharply southeast around the southern edge of Maple Grove Cemetery, slowing service.

The land for the right-of-way to the west of Lefferts Avenue was acquired from the Cord Meyer Development Corporation, while the land to the east was purchased from Alrick Man, the founder of the urban neighborhood of Richmond Hill. While he had to sell the property of the Richmond Hill Golf Club and 25 acres of estate, he still owned a lot of the land in Richmond Hill, and therefore financially benefitted from the move. Since the golf course was going to be cut in half by the railroad, Man closed the course in 1906, and decided to sell the course and turn it into a residential community. The right-of-way initially had room for six tracks, of which four tracks were built. The two additional tracks would have been used for freight. The LIRR's right-of-way increased from 50 to 60 feet (15 to 18 m) to 150 feet (46 m). Crystal Lake, which was in the path of the Cut-Off, was drained in 1909. As part of the initial agreement, bridges over the new right-of-way were to be built over Quentin Road (now 80th Road) and Lefferts Avenue.

The Maple Grove station was moved from its location 500 feet (150 m) south of Kew Gardens Road (old Newtown Avenue) to a spot 600 feet (180 m) south along the north side of tracks on the west side of Lefferts Avenue, closer to the built-up portion of Richmond Hill. Man built streets through the property of the old golf club, and built elegant homes close to the new railroad station, creating what is known as Kew Gardens today. On November 20, 1908, the New York Public Service Commission approved the LIRR's application to complete the Maple Grove Cut-Off.

Limited construction began on the Cut-Off in November 1908, with real work beginning in March 1909. On December 4, 1908, the New York City Board of Estimate approved the plans for bridges at Union Turnpike and Ascan Avenue, but did not approve the plans for the bridge carrying Quentin Road and Lefferts Avenue over the line as these streets were not yet included on the city's map. The plans were modified in 1909 to add bridges at Penelope Avenue and Ascan Avenue. The grading of the right-of-way and the laying of track was completed by September 1909. On July 26, 1909, eastbound trains started running over the Maple Grove Cut-Off. On July 30, westbound trains began running via the cut-off with its completion. Following the completion of the Cut-Off, riders who patronized the Richmond Hill station on the Montauk Division were concerned that passenger service to their station would be discontinued, requiring them to use the station replacing Maple Grove on the Main Line. The LIRR stated that the station would continue to receive service.

Provisions were left for future crossings at Roman Avenue (72nd Avenue), Puritan Avenue (75th Avenue), and Allegheny Avenue (77th Avenue). The floor system of the Union Turnpike bridge was designed to allow for two trolley tracks to pass over it. All of the bridges completed as part of the project were constructed with concrete floors, heavy steel girders, and watertight steel.

As part of the agreement with the Long Island Rail Road, the property occupied by the old right-of-way was transferred to Cord Meyer and Alrick Man. The old railroad right-of-way was built up with residences, but in 1936, portions of the right-of-way within Forest Hills, around Austin Street and 75th Avenue, were still unused.

=== Kew Gardens station ===
On September 8, 1910, the new Kew station opened along with the introduction of electric service to Penn Station using the Maple Grove Cut-Off. The first train left the station at 4:14 a.m. The first passenger boarding at Kew was also the first passenger to pass through the gates at Penn Station The new station was 108 feet (33 m) long and its station building was built as a one-story structure made of terra cotta and stucco. It was built in the fall of 1909. The station's quick access to Manhattan (15 minutes) was used by the Kew Gardens Corporation in advertisements to convince buyers to move to the community. Service initially consisted of more than twenty daily trains in each direction, with many trains running nonstop to Penn Station owing to the railroad's franchise which prohibited passenger stations within 5 miles (8.0 km) of Penn Station. In anticipation of the demand for housing in the community, the Haugaard brothers purchased land from the Man estate and built several houses within a few minutes of the station. Between 1910 and 1911, 38 buildings were built in the community.

The old station building for Maple Grove was moved approximately 600 feet (180 m) south alongside and perpendicular to the tracks for use as a real estate office of developers of Kew, but was razed a short time later. Prior to the opening of the new station, and the development accompanying it, the station was referred to as North Richmond Hill, but was named Kew after residents and the Long Island Rail Road requested that the name be changed to avoid confusion. Soon after, in 1912, the station was renamed Kew Gardens. This name was chosen as it was the name of an adjacent town to Richmond Hill, England, which was the ancestral home of Alrick Man.

On July 1, 1914, the Hillside Transportation Company began running a bus line along Lefferts Avenue connecting Kew Gardens station with Morris Park station. In October 1923, the LIRR finished a project extending one of the platforms in the station to the west. On December 19, 1928, the New York State Transit Commission ordered the LIRR to increase service at Kew Gardens and to lengthen the westbound platform to eleven cars. The LIRR agreed to extend the platform on January 10, 1929. The platform was lengthened in 1929. At some point, the eastbound platform was lengthened.

On March 17, 1936, at a hearing of the New York State Transit Commission and the New York State Public Service Commission, the LIRR said that it would seek permission in 1937 to abandon the three stations along the Main Line between Jamaica and Pennsylvania Station—Kew Gardens, Forest Hills, and Woodside. The LIRR had said that it anticipated a loss of annual revenue between $750,000 and $1 million with the opening of the extension of the Independent Subway System's Queens Boulevard Line to Jamaica.

Following the opening of the Queens Boulevard Line to Kew Gardens on December 31, 1936, ridership at this station decreased, with the downturn noticed as early as July 1937.

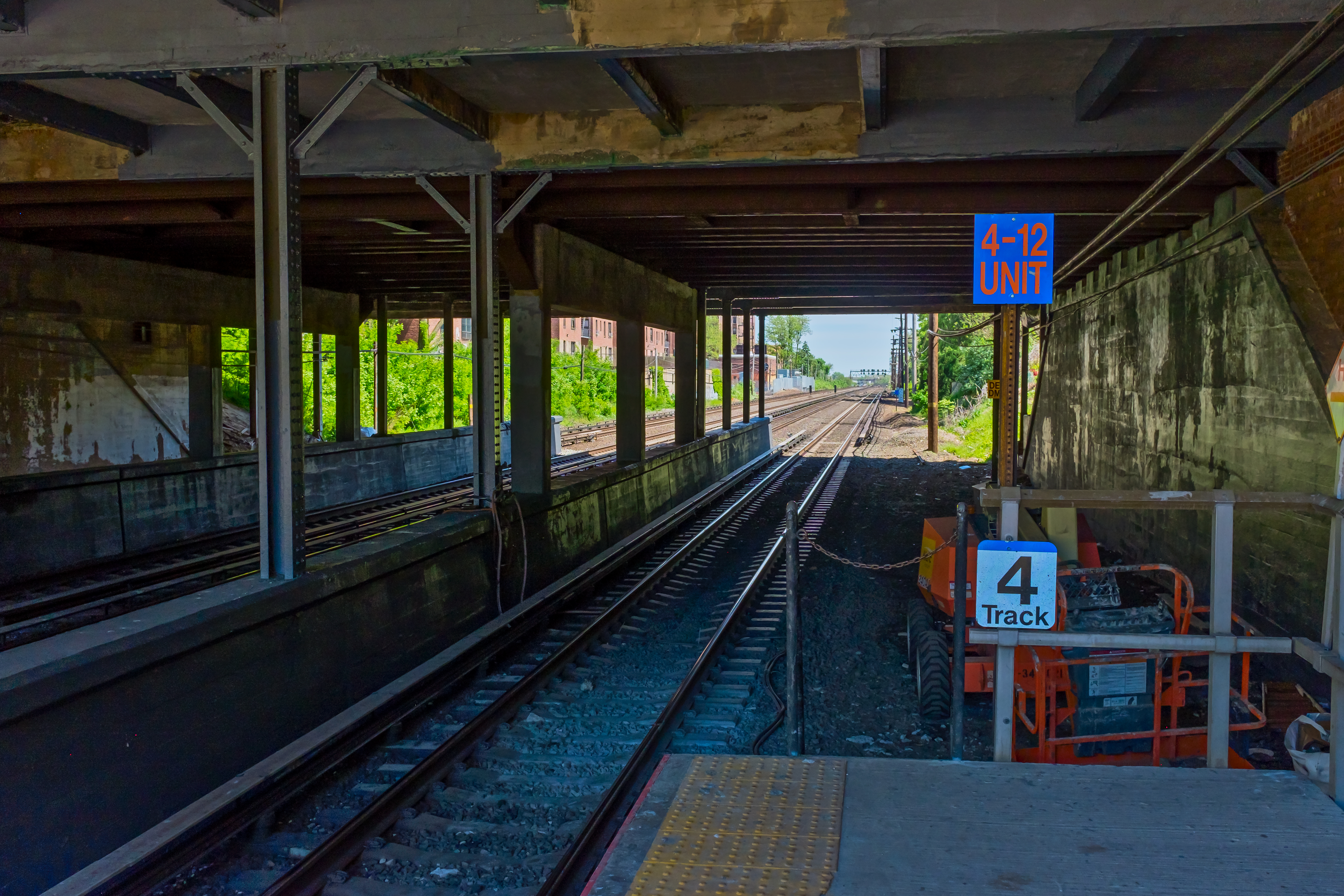
A view to the east of the station, towards the site of the collision.

The Kew Gardens station became the site of the worst accident in the histories of both the Long Island Rail Road and New York State. On November 22, 1950, a collision between two Long Island Rail Road commuter trains to the east of the station killed 79 people and injured hundreds. This occurred nine months after a collision at Rockville Centre station on February 17, 1950, which resulted in the deaths of 32 people and the serious injury of 158 people. Another notorious historical aspect is the 1964 murder of Kitty Genovese, which occurred near the Kew Gardens station after Genovese had parked her car at its northern parking lot.

On November 7, 1960, a concrete portion of the westbound station platform collapsed, injuring three people.

On July 1, 1964, the Tri-State Transit Commission began a year-long test of a mechanical fare collection system at the westbound platforms of Kew Gardens and Forest Hills. Fencing was installed, requiring passengers to enter through the station house and then insert their magnetically encoded tickets into turnstiles.

In November 1963, the LIRR announced a plan to shorten the platforms at Forest Hills and Kew Gardens by 300 feet (91 m). The railroad's justification was that ridership at the stations was low, and did not warrant repairing the crumbling concrete. These sections of platforms had been installed in about 1929 to allow the stations to accommodate full-length trains. This move was opposed by civic groups, and resulted in an investigation by the Public Service Commission. However, the platform extensions were removed by March 1964. Prior to their removal, the platforms extended to the overpass at 82nd Avenue (formerly known as Onslow Place). A staircase from each platform allowed passengers to enter and leave the station from its western end. The eastbound platform used to have a waiting room, but it was removed in the late 1970s. In the early 1990s, the westbound platform was extended by about 200 feet (61 m), doubling the number of cars that could platform at the station to four.

On February 1, 1980, the LIRR, in response to audit released by the state comptroller on November 16, 1979, submitted a proposal to close 29 stations, including Kew Gardens, to save $250,000. The audit evaluated ticket sales in 1976, and recommended that stations with fewer than 60 transactions per hour be closed. Thirty-nine LIRR stations fell in to this category, but ten were not recommended for closure, either because they were terminals or switch locations. In addition to Kew Gardens, Forest Hills, East Hampton, Westhampton, Sea Cliff and Locust Valley would be completely closed. The other stations would have been closed on weekends, every day but Monday, or closed half of the day.

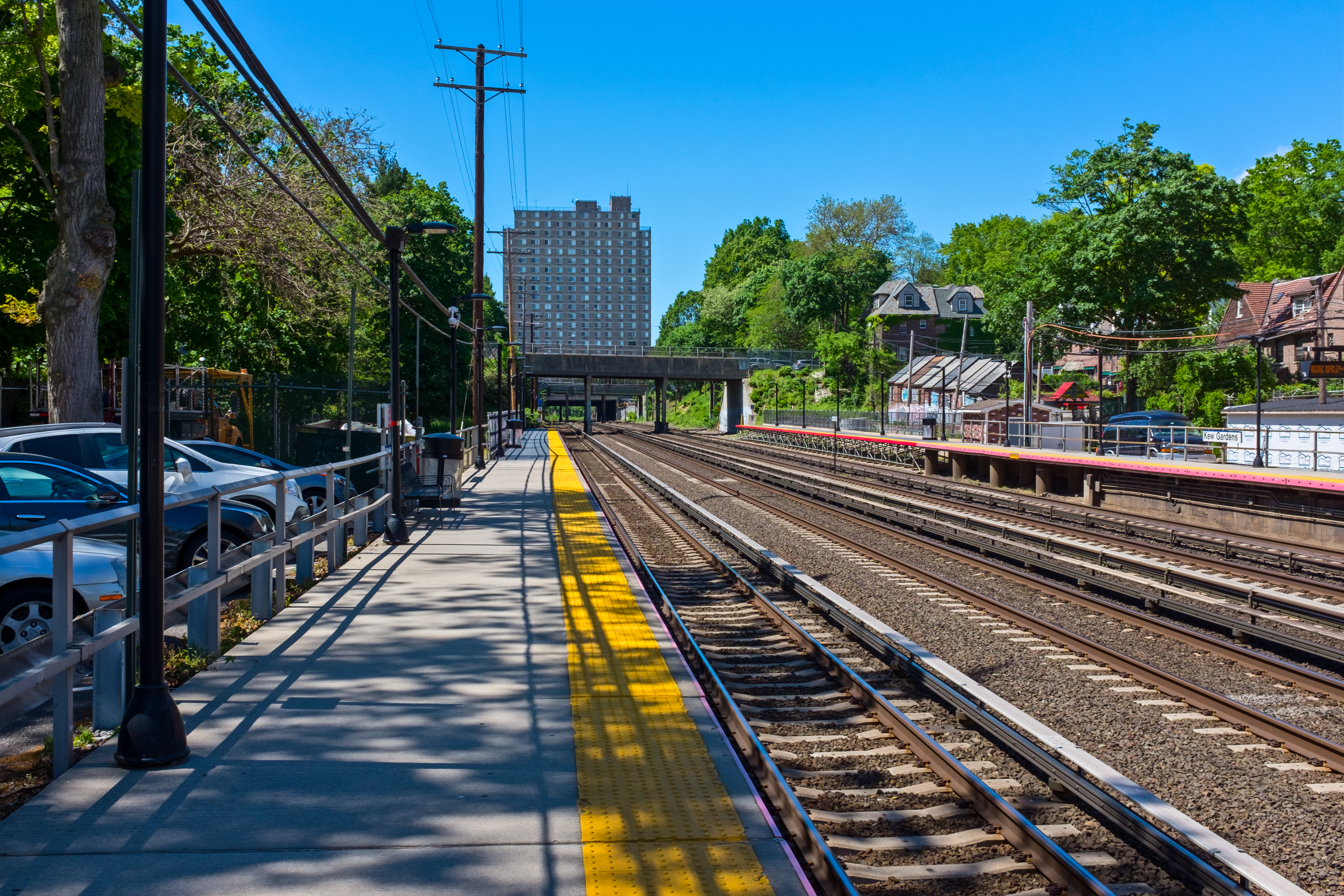
A view of the station with the new platform extensions.

==== Platform extensions ====
In the Metropolitan Transportation Authority (MTA)'s 2010–2014 capital program, it proposed lengthening the four-car-long platforms at Kew Gardens to allow additional train cars to board at the station. The platform extensions would reduce waiting time at the station while allowing for more efficient operations between Jamaica and Penn Station. Although $4.5 million was allocated for the project, the money was ultimately redistributed to other projects. (Note: A revision to the Capital Program from June 2010 does not include the Kew Gardens platform extension project.) The MTA also recommended lengthening the platforms at Kew Gardens and Forest Hills in its 2015-2034 Twenty-Year Capital Needs Assessment, its strategic vision for capital needs over the twenty year period.

On July 26, 2018, it was announced that the LIRR planned to extend the platforms at Kew Gardens and Forest Hills by 200 feet (61 m) to accommodate six-car trains. The platform extensions will consist of fiberglass decking supported by steel scaffolding structures, allowing the extensions to be completed quickly, and at a low cost, while allowing the LIRR to plan for a permanent solution. Preparation work began during the week of July 23, and the new extensions went into service on September 10, 2018.

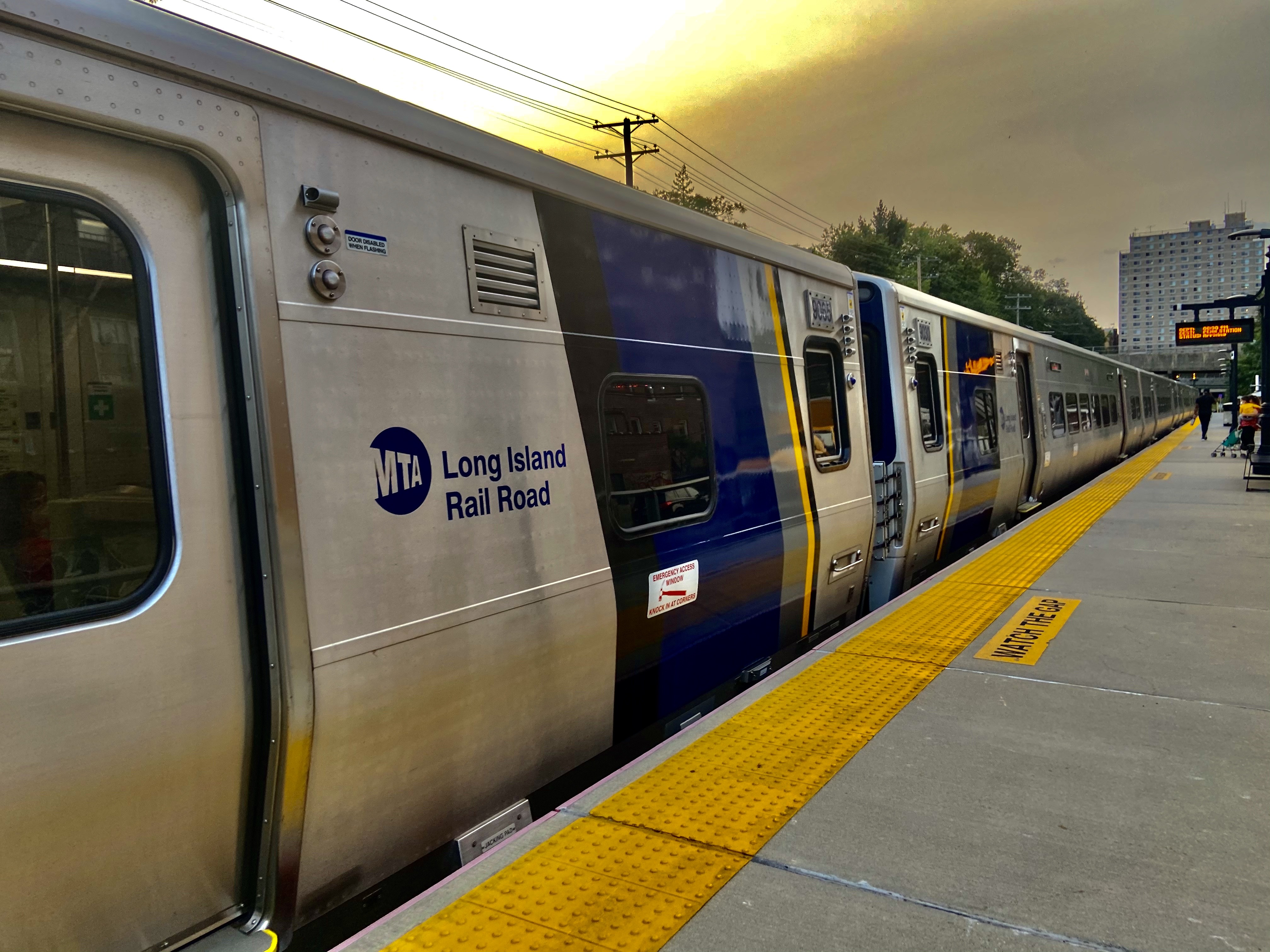
A train of M9s stopped at Kew Gardens.

==== Ticket booth ====
On August 19, 2009, the staffed ticket booth at the station was closed along with those at 19 other stations to cut costs. The ticket office had been open between 6:10 and 9 a.m. In October 2012, the LIRR announced that it would extend the hours of the waiting room to 10 p.m. on weekdays as part of a pilot program. The waiting room, which previously operated from 6 a.m. to 10 a.m., had its operating hours extended to between 5 a.m. and 10 p.m. In late 2016, the station hours were cut back to 2 p.m.

== Station layout ==
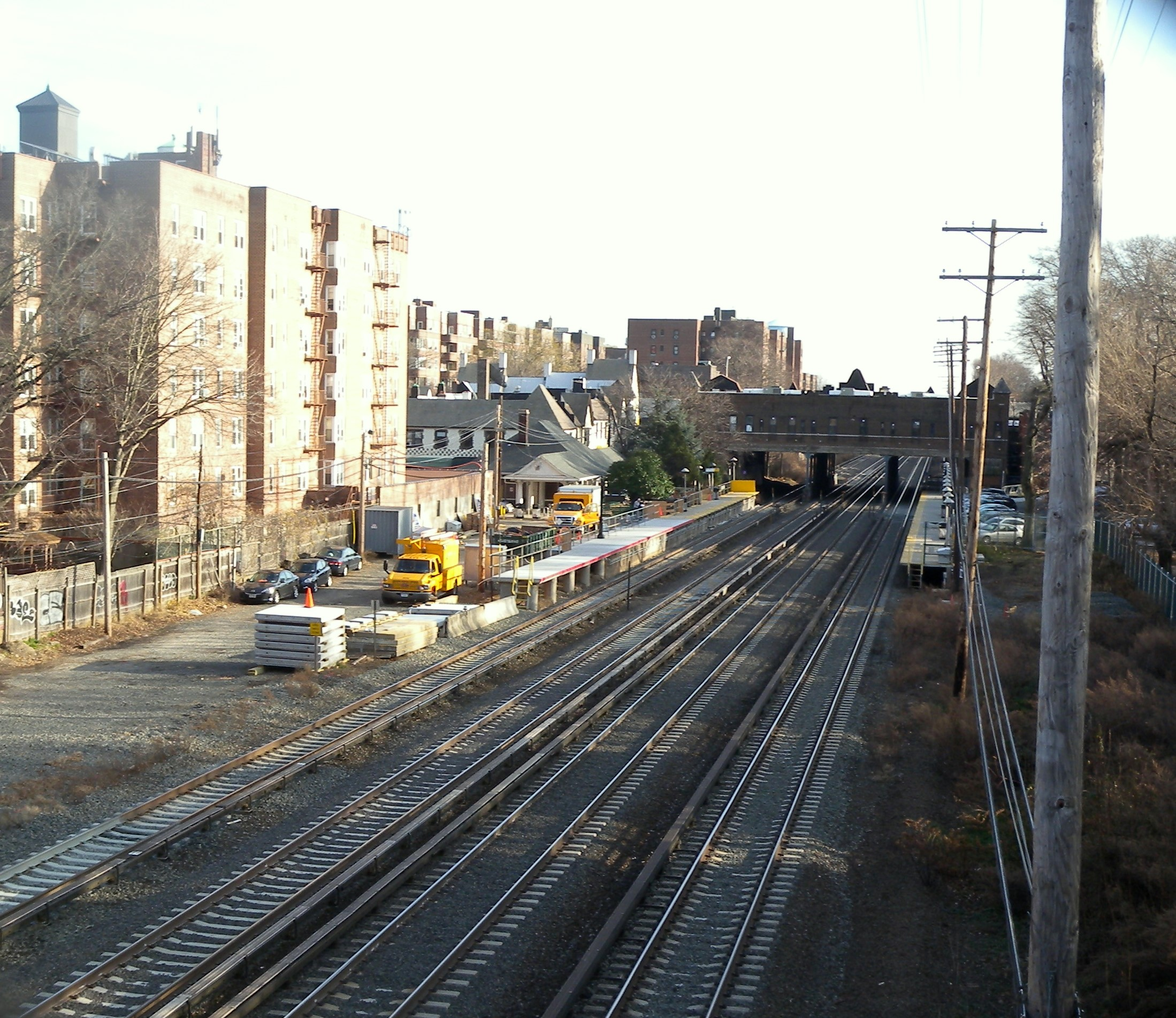
A view of the station from the 82nd Avenue bridge in 2011, when the platforms were shorter.

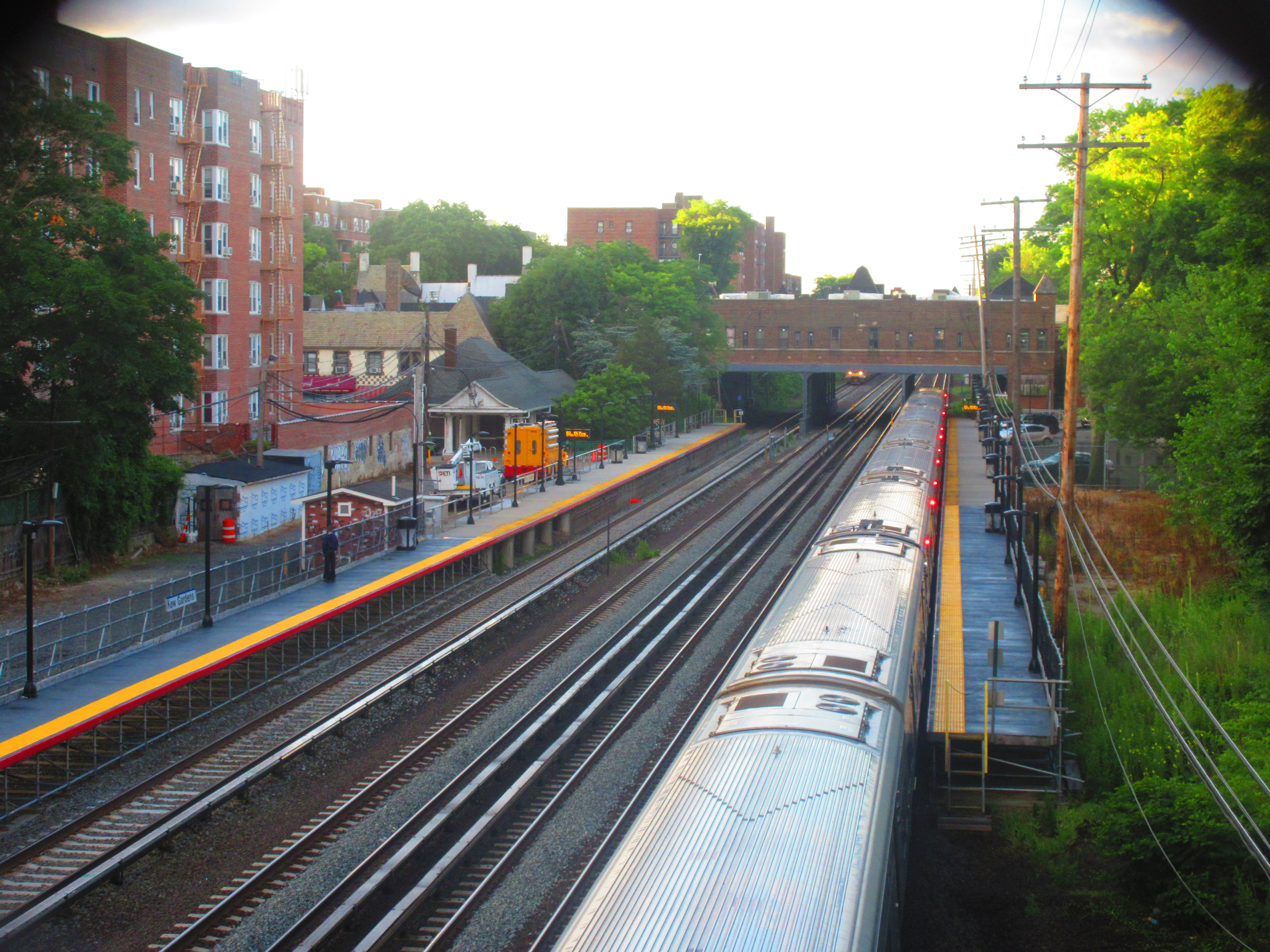
A view of the station from the 82nd Avenue bridge in 2020 with the platform extensions.

The station building is located on the westbound platform and the waiting room is open weekdays from 5 a.m. to 2 p.m. The waiting room has a bathroom. A former ticket booth was located on Platform A. Two ticket machines are located adjacent to the building. The station has a small free parking lot that is open between 5 a.m. and 3 a.m., making it in the only station in the City Terminal Zone to have parking.

This station has two high-level side platforms, each six cars long. Generally, only the first six cars of a train in either direction will receive and discharge passengers at this station. The north platform next to Track 3 is generally used by westbound or Manhattan-bound trains. The south platform next to Track 4 is generally used by eastbound or outbound trains. Most LIRR trains that pass through the station do not stop. There are no platforms on the two middle tracks, as they are used by express trains. The station platforms are ADA-accessible by means of ramps. However, the station is not listed as being ADA-accessible by the MTA; since the two platforms are disconnected, passengers who wish to cross between the two platforms must use the Lefferts Boulevard Bridge.

== Lefferts Boulevard Bridge ==
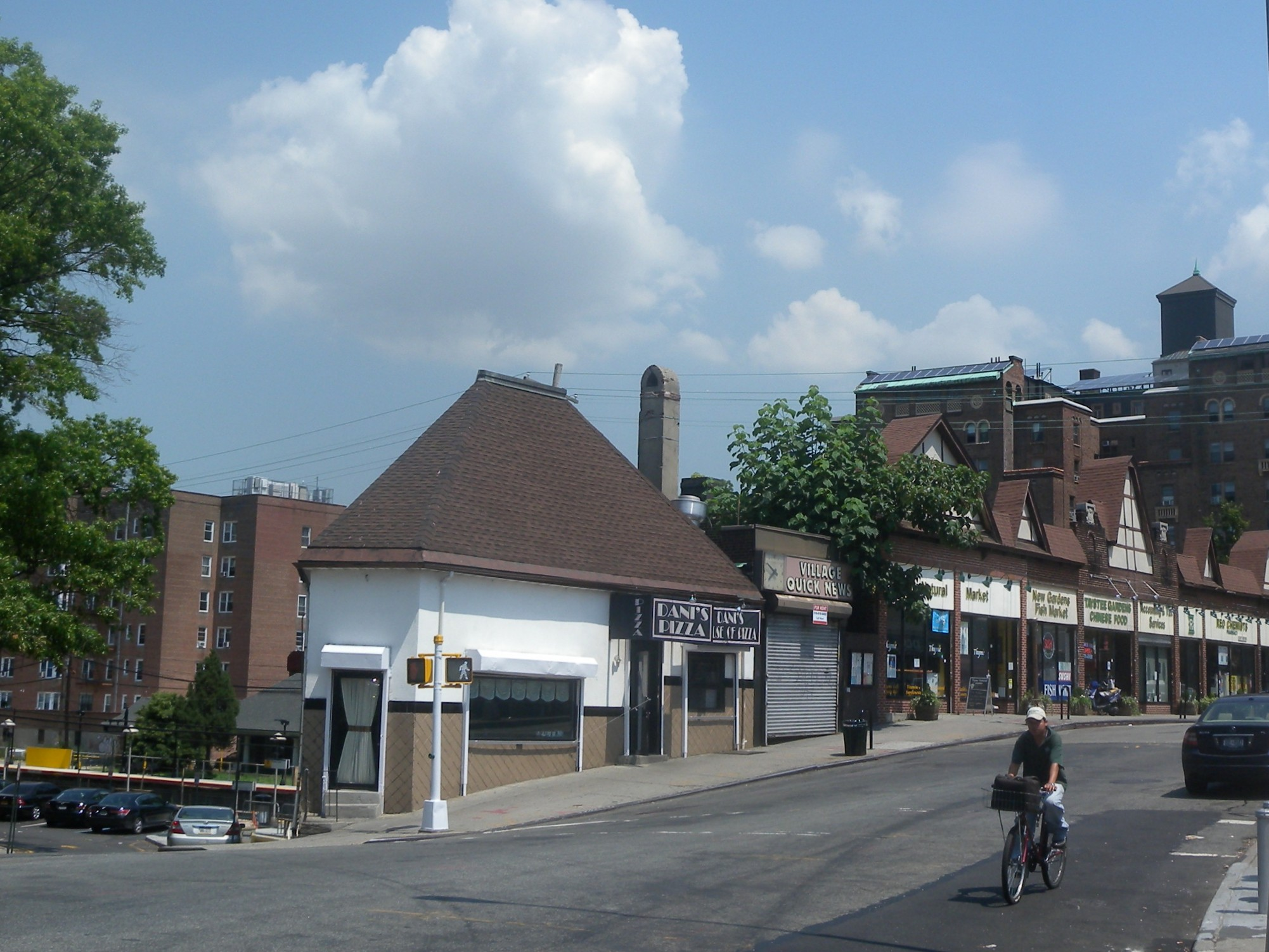
All the shops to the right of the pizzeria are on the Lefferts Boulevard bridge over the station

In order to pass over the Long Island Rail Road, at the eastern end of the Kew Gardens station, Lefferts Boulevard passes over on an 180 foot (55 m)-long bridge, which is lined on both sides with commercial buildings. The bridge was built in 1910, and the stores on either side of the bridge, which were located on their own bridges, were constructed in the early 1930s. The bridges that hold the stores in place actually run through their roofs, with the stores hanging from the bridge. The bridge upon which Lefferts Boulevard passes over is owned by the New York City Department of Transportation (NYCDOT) while the other two bridges are owned by the LIRR and are leased to a master tenant which leases out the buildings to local businesses. The building facade for the stores on the western side of the bridge is in the neo-Tudor design while the facade for the stores on the eastern side is in the Art Deco style. The bridge has been called Ponte Vecchio, meaning "old bridge" in Italian, and refers to the bridge in Florence, which has stores on either side of it. The Bridge is the heart of the community of Kew Gardens, and its residents have attributed the charm of the neighborhood to it. It is the only bridge in New York City, and likely in the United States that has stores on either side of it, and therefore many Kew Gardens residents have pushed for its designation as a landmark on the National Registry of Historical Places to protect it from development.

=== Demolition threats ===
In 1990, the MTA drafted plans to build a ten-story condominium on top of the Kew Gardens station's north side parking lot, only 100 feet (30 m) from the bridge. Following opposition from local civic leaders, such as Representative Gary Ackerman, and some local residents, who cited potential damage to the Lefferts Boulevard Bridge, and stated that the development would threaten the neighborhood's character, the MTA withdrew these plans in February 1991. This followed another battle between the MTA and the community. In 1990, all service was scheduled to be cut at this station and the station at Forest Hills to enable renovation work at Harold Interlocking. After community pushback, some limited service was kept to the two stations. The MTA's real estate department conducted a study that found that the development might not have been economically feasible. While initial plans would have had the development be 14-stories tall, this was later lowered to ten stories. The project would have cost $31 million to construct, would have had 200 units, and would have provided $625,000 a year for the MTA from a lease with the developer of the project. In February 1991, the MTA said that it would start to solicit bids on the master lease for the 19 buildings on the Lefferts Boulevard Bridge, which was scheduled to expire in November, by the end of the year.

In June 1991, the NYCDOT began a $2.9 million project to rebuild the concrete surface of the bridge and to replace its steel girders and deck beams. The project was scheduled to be completed in 15 months. Due to construction, sidewalks were narrowed, parking was abolished, and traffic was slowed with the roadway narrowed to two lanes. As a result, business declined at the stores on either side of the bridge, with nine of the thirteen stores on the bridge closing, even as rents were halved. However, from October 1991 to January 1992 work stopped due to a design error, which made the new girders an inch too high. Completion was then delayed by three months. In 1992, the MTA ended the lease of the company that had managed the stores on the bridge since 1981 citing the company's refusal to make repairs which allowed the stores to deteriorate. The agency, for the next 14 months, rented stores, at a discounted rate, every month, as it was looking for a buyer to make repairs. The MTA did not pay for the repairs as it had more "pressing repairs" which needed to be done to keep the subway system running.

In May 2017, the MTA announced that it wanted to rebuild the bridge, which runs from Austin Street to Grenfell Street. It told business owners on the bridge that their stores would be torn down once the management company's lease expired in 2020. If the bridge was rebuilt, it was unclear what would replace the existing businesses. The bridge is in such bad condition that in spring 2017, a hole opened up in the storage room of the Thyme Natural Market. In response, the Save Kew Gardens Coalition was created in order to convince the MTA not to tear down the bridge. The coalition is made up of local civic groups such as the Kew Gardens Civic Association, the Kew Gardens Improvement Association and the Friends of Maple Grove Cemetery. In July, in response to strong community opposition and pushback from City Council Member Karen Koslowitz and others, MTA officials changed their stance, opening up to possible ideas about how to repair the bridge decks, which are 80 years old and decaying, while keeping the businesses in place. Mayor Bill de Blasio, when asked, said that he was against its demolition, and sent DOT engineers to visit the site. Also in July, three engineers, one from the NYCDOT, one from the MTA, and a retired engineer, Al Brand, determined that is might be feasible to install an additional concrete slab, which would be 12 inches (30 cm) to 14 inches (36 cm) wide, underneath the bridge. This alternative was deemed feasible.

The MTA announced that an engineering feasibility study, which would be funded by Koslowitz, would be conducted, but it is unclear how much it will cost and who will conduct it. Koslowitz had hoped to use $1 million to fund it, but because it is capital money, it can only be used for construction. Instead, she started looking for funding from the city and state. On November 14, 2017, Queens Community Board 9 unanimously backed a resolution asking the MTA not to tear down the bridge. On July 11, 2018, the LIRR announced that it planned to repair the bridge, using the funds that Koslowitz had obtained for a study.
