= Lefferts =

Lefferts may refer to:

== People ==
- Charles M. Lefferts (1873–1923), American illustrator and soldier
- Craig Lefferts (born 1957), American professional baseball player
- George Lefferts (1921–2018), American writer, producer and director
- John Lefferts (1785–1829), American politician
- Winifred E. Lefferts (1903–1995), American painter, designer and philanthropist

== Places ==
- Lefferts Island, Nunavut, Canada
- Lake Lefferts, Matawan, New Jersey

== Other uses ==
- Lefferts Boulevard, formerly Lefferts Avenue, street in Queens, New York City
- Lefferts Historic House, Brooklyn, New York
- Ozone Park–Lefferts Boulevard (IND Fulton Street Line), elevated station at Lefferts Boulevard
- Prospect Lefferts Gardens, Brooklyn, neighborhood

== See also ==
- Leffert (disambiguation)
