= Lisa Ysaye Tarleau =

American writer

Lisa Ysale Tarleau (1878–1952), also known as Lisa Ysaye, was an early 20th-century American writer. Her short stories appeared in major magazines of the day, including Harper's Magazine, The Nation (Volume 105, Issue 2725, September 20, 1917) and The Atlantic Monthly (in 1919). Several of her works were also included in The Fireside Book of Romance (c. 1948), edited by C. Edward Wagenknecht.

The Inn of Disenchantment was published in 1917 by the Houghton Mifflin Company and Riverside Press. It is a collection of prose and several short stories utilizing the same two character types—"The Lady in Blue" and "The Gentleman in Gray"—who appear in most of them. The stories are structured as a series of romantic discussions.

Tarleau also wrote a number of scripts for radio and film and worked as a translator for the US military during World War II. She died on October 9, 1952, in Kew Gardens, Queens, Long Island, New York.

She had four sons and one daughter.

== Awards and honors ==
In 1925, her short story "Loutre" received a prize for 2nd place from Harper's Magazine.
