= Rona Elliot =

American journalist (born 1947)

- Born: February 22, 1947
- Occupation: music journalist
- Children: 3

Rona Elliot (born February 22, 1947) is an American music journalist and interviewer of television, radio, and print. She was the first news anchor on music channel VH1 and music correspondent for NBC's Today show for ten years.

== Early life and career ==
Born in to a Jewish family Brooklyn, New York, Elliot grew up in Kew Gardens, Queens until age 10 when the family moved to Los Angeles.

== Career ==
=== Radio ===
Hired by program director Ron Jacobs, Elliot began her radio career at the influential Los Angeles AM radio station, KHJ, part of the Drake-Chenault Enterprises portfolio of radio stations. KHJ pioneered the “Boss Radio” format during the era of flamboyant disc jockeys including the Real Don Steele and Robert W. Morgan.

Elliot later became immersed in the 1970s San Francisco underground radio scene working at stations KMPX-FM and KSAN-FM. She was an on-air anchor on San Francisco NBC owned and operated radio stations KNBR and KNAI from 1975 to 1976.

In 1977 Elliot moved to Hawaii, becoming news director and on-air reporter for radio stations KKUA and KQMQ-FM while also filing stories for the NBC Radio Network where she would later become a producer at NBC Radio Network News on the Hour in New York in 1981.

==== NBC Radio Networks ====
Elliot became program director for NBC's Young Adult Radio Network The Source in 1982. She is credited with first introducing American audiences to Band Aid’s charity single, Do They Know It's Christmas?

=== Music Festivals ===
==== Newport Pop Festival ====
Elliot joined KHJ colleague Harvey "Humble Harve" Miller who was hired to promote the 1968 Newport Pop Festival. Elliot worked as public relations liaison leading up to show then managed backstage public relations during the event. The Newport Pop Festival was the first music festival to reach attendance of 100,000 people.

==== Miami Pop Festival ====
Elliot moved from Los Angeles to Miami, Florida with radio executive, Tom Rounds, and concert promoter, Mel Lawrence, to stage the Miami Pop Festival (December 1968) (not to be confused with the May 1968 festival of the same name). Elliot served as artist and community liaison for the festival.

==== Woodstock ====
Michael Lang hired Elliot to work at the Woodstock Festival in May 1969. She served as a public relations liaise between festival organizers and the local community. Along with other show veterans, Elliot stayed with Woodstock performer, Arlo Guthrie, in the months after the festival.

=== Television ===
In 1975, Elliot co-hosted the talk show, Went Like It Came, produced in San Francisco for KTVU. The program included guests such as Wavy Gravy, Werner Erhard, and Bonnie Raitt.

In 1977, Elliot produced programming for experimental two-way, multi-programmed cable station, QUBE alongside former Elektra Records founder, Jac Holzman in Honolulu.

Elliot was hired in 1985 as music correspondent on NBC's Today Show. While with the program, she covered the biggest music artists and stories of the decade, including Band Aid, Live Aid, Tina Turner's ‘80s comeback, and the rise of U2. Elliot appeared as herself in the 1992 TV special of the Zoo TV Tour entitled Zoo TV Featuring U2, directed by Kevin Godley.

==== VH1 ====
Elliot was hired by program director, Jarl Mohn, in 1985 as the network’s first news anchor. While with the network, she anchored part of the Austin, Texas, Farm Aid concert of 1986.

== Personal life ==
=== Counterculture & Social Activism ===
Throughout the 1960s and 1970s, Elliot was aligned with a variety of counterculture and social movements. While roommates with Chicago Seven Yippie leader Jerry Rubin, Elliot opened up the San Francisco office for political satire magazine, The Realist. While at the magazine, Elliot served as a “realist spy” for magazine founder, Paul Krassner. Among her assignments was going undercover at a Scientology conference under the pseudonym, “Kitty Litter.”

Elliot also lived in the 5 acre bohemian community of Druid Heights in Marin County, California with Zen Buddhist teacher Alan Watts and his wife Mary Jane Yates King (known as "Jano"), architect and musician Roger Somers, feminist poet Elsa Gidlow, sex positive feminist, Margo St. James, woodworker Ed Stiles, and ceramicist Marilyn Stiles. With St. James she lived in the house built for poet Gary Snyder.

=== Philanthropy ===
In 2010 Elliot became a board member for the Rock and Roll Hall of Fame Foundation, part of the Rock and Roll Hall of Fame Museum in Cleveland, where her papers are included in their archive of rock history memorabilia. She also sits on the board of directors for Little Kids Rock.

In 1975, Elliot trained to become an interviewer of Holocaust survivors for the USC Shoah Foundation : The Institute for Visual History and Education (originally the Steven Spielberg Shoah Visual History Foundation).

=== Educator ===
Elliot has taught continuing education courses on music and pop culture and lectured at University of California, Los Angeles (UCLA), New York University (NYU), Amherst College, Oregon State University, and Berklee College of Music.

== Published works ==
- USA Today, multiple bylines covering TV series American Idol (2007-2008)
- Mick & Keith: Never Stop 'Mick & Keith: Never Stop' (celebrating The Rolling Stone's 50th Anniversary) with exclusive, never before seen interviews with Mick Jagger & Keith Richards of The Rolling Stones during the Steel Wheels tour.
- Genesis Publications, UK – editorial contributor Woodstock Experience – story of Woodstock Festival 40th anniversary (limited edition collectible book)
- Genesis Publications, UK - editorial contributor California Dreamin’ - Henry Diltz – the story of music in Southern California 1968-1972 (limited edition collectible book)

Notes

1. Broadcasting 1-14-1985 p. 188
2. Billboard 10-26-1985 p. 18
3. Today Show on YouTube (1986)
4. Zoo TV Featuring U2 on YouTube (1992)
