= Leffert =

Leffert may refer to:

- Leffert L. Buck (1837 - 1909), American civil engineer

== See also ==
- Lefferts (disambiguation)
