= Lefferts Boulevard =

Street in Queens, New York

Lefferts Boulevard is a major north–south thoroughfare in Queens, New York City, running through the communities of Kew Gardens, Richmond Hill, and South Ozone Park. Its northern end is at Kew Gardens Road, in Kew Gardens, and its southern end is located within John F. Kennedy International Airport. Lefferts Boulevard intersects with other major roads such as Metropolitan Avenue, Jamaica Avenue, and Atlantic Avenue. It is 119th Street for its entire run.

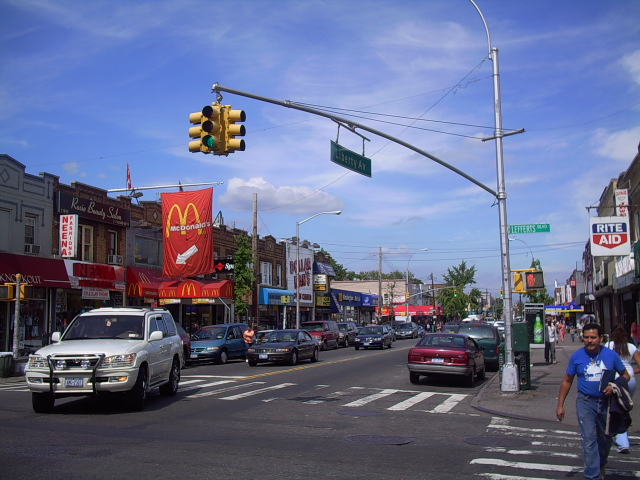
Liberty Avenue intersecting Lefferts Boulevard

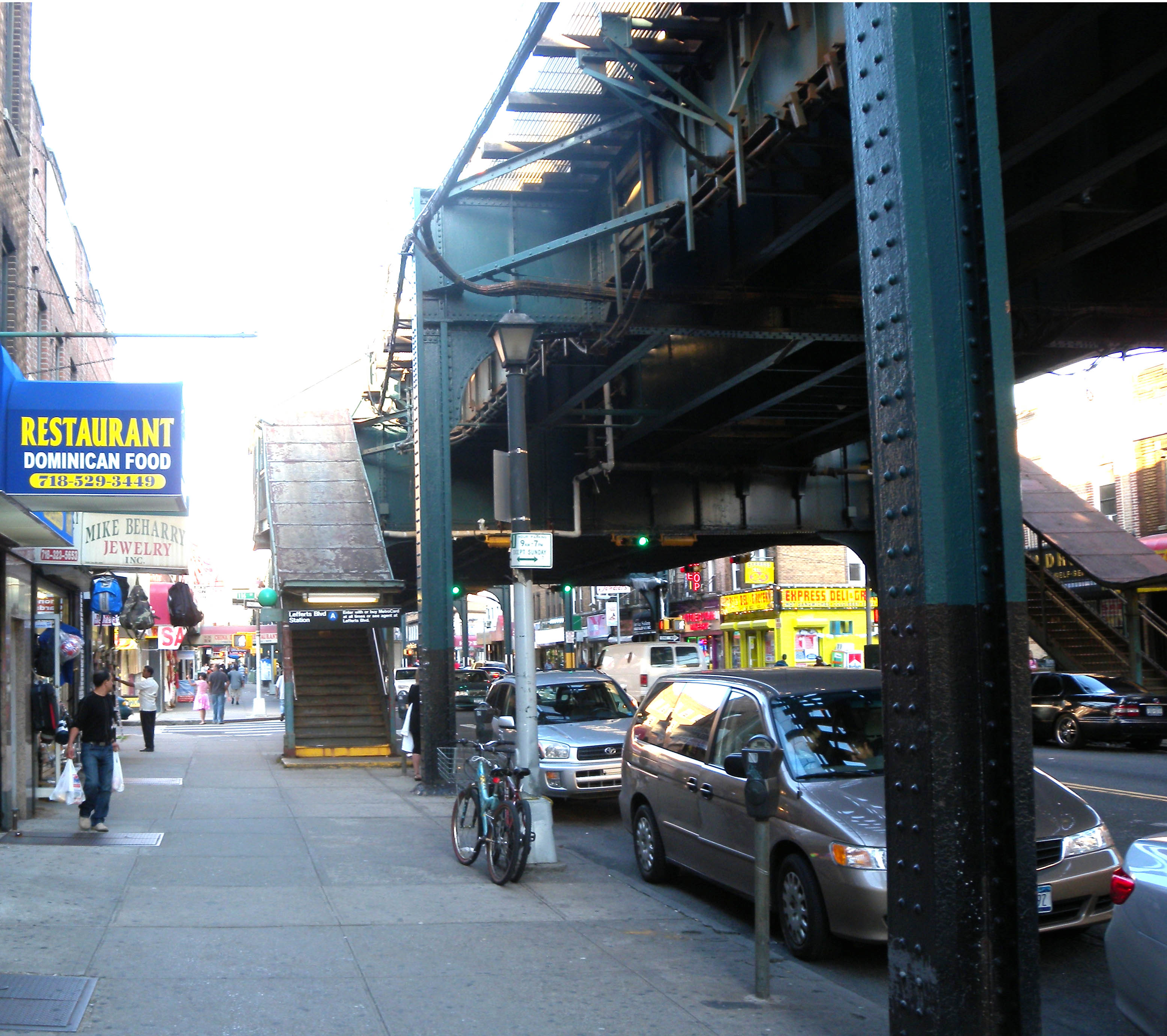
Ozone Park-Lefferts Boulevard station

== Name ==
The road is named for the influential Lefferts family, who played a significant role in the development of the area. The family, who extended their land holdings also in Brooklyn, Long Island, and New Jersey, was among the early Dutch settlers in the region, and their presence and contributions left a lasting mark on the community.

== Transportation ==
Under MTA Regional Bus Operations, Lefferts Boulevard is served by the following:

- The Q80 serves the entire boulevard north of Pan Am Road, and is joined with the QM18 express at 135th Avenue and the Q10 at Rockaway Boulevard. All Q10 and Q80 service to JFK Airport originates at Austin Street.
- The Q37 runs between Rockaway Boulevard and 135th Avenue.

The following New York City Subway stations serve the corridor:

- Kew Gardens–Union Turnpike station, just west of the boulevard's north end, is served by the IND Queens Boulevard Line (E, F, and <F> trains).
- The BMT Jamaica Line (J and Z trains) crosses Lefferts Boulevard at Jamaica Avenue, with the closest station being one block east at 121st Street.
- The IND Fulton Street Line (A train) stops at the Ozone Park–Lefferts Boulevard station at Liberty Avenue.

Near its southern end, the boulevard is also served by AirTrain JFK at said stop.

- The Q3 and B15 buses are currently using the boulevard to terminate at the AirTrain stop due to construction at JFK Airport’s Terminal 5, respectively north from Pan Am Road and south from either Nassau Expressway (JFK), or North Conduit Avenue (Brooklyn).
