= Q10 and Q80 buses =

Bus route in Queens, New York

q10 rush q80
- Lefferts Boulevard−JFK Airport
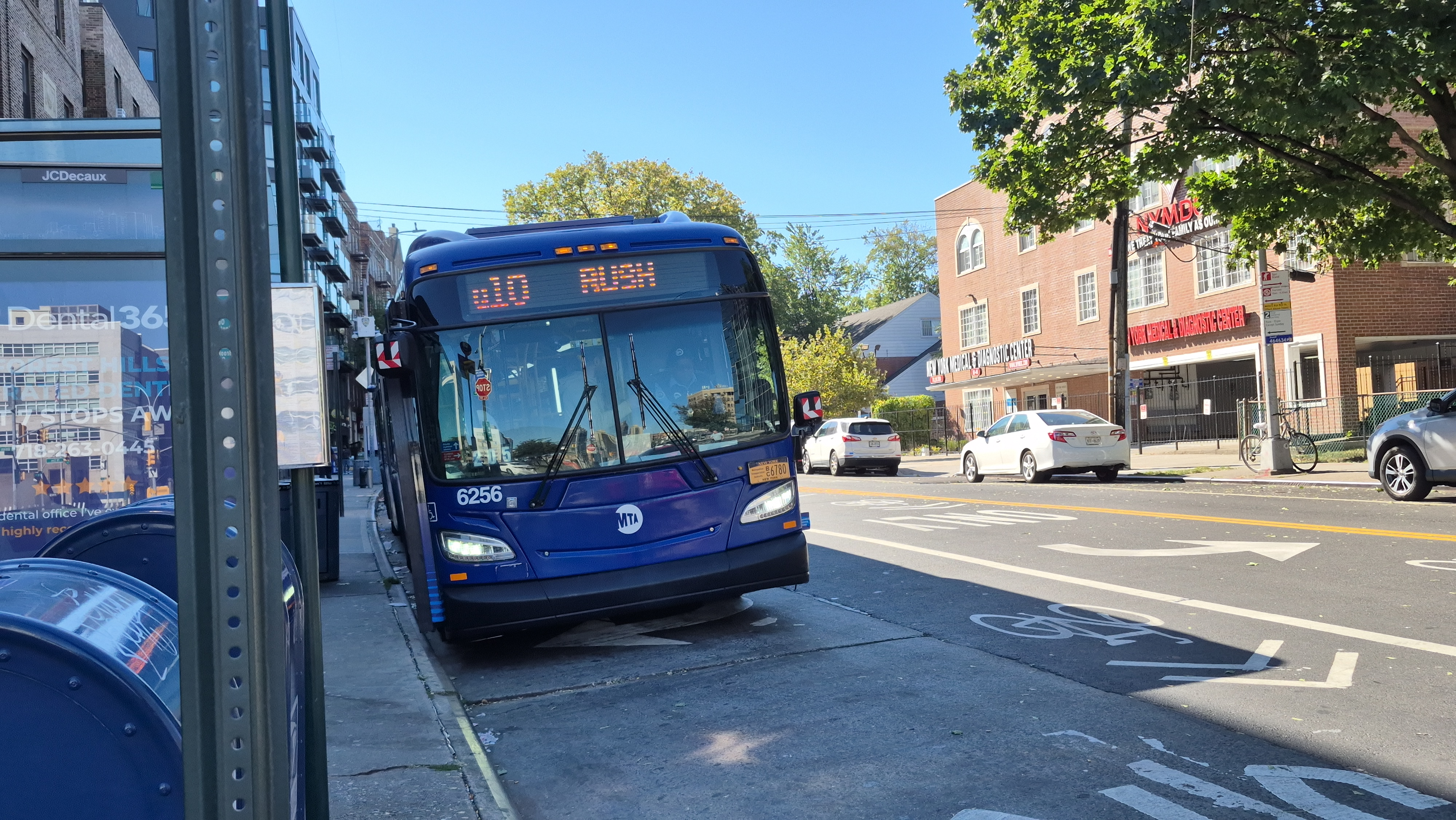
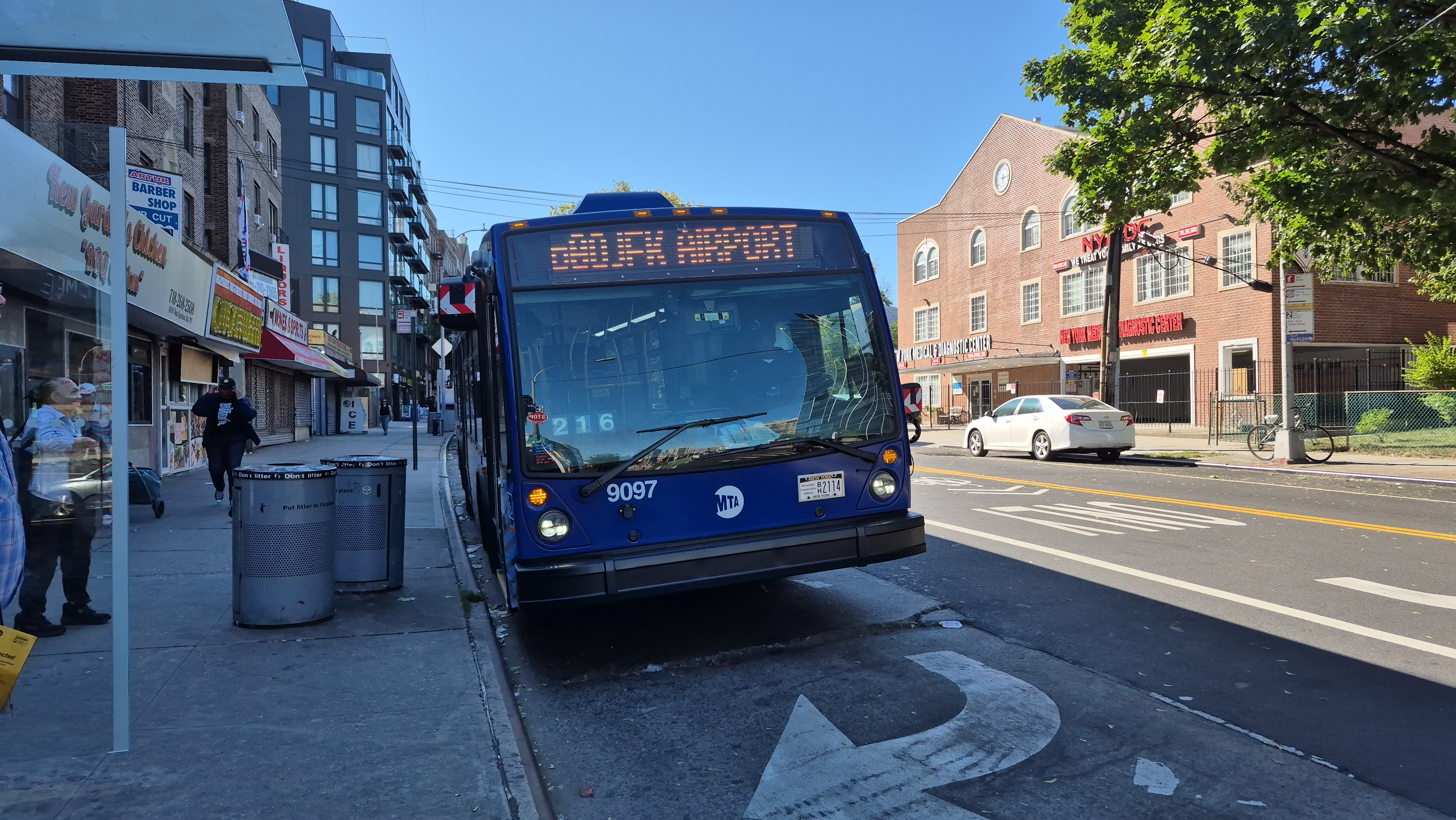
- A 2020 New Flyer XD60 (6256) on the Q10 Rush (left) and a 2023 Nova LFS (9097) on the Q80 Local in Kew Gardens, Queens (right)

Overview
- System: MTA Regional Bus Operations
- Operator: MTA Bus Company
- Garage: JFK Depot
- Vehicle: New Flyer Xcelsior XD60 (main vehicle); New Flyer Xcelsior XD40; Nova Bus LFS (supplemental)

Route
- Locale: Queens, New York, U.S.
- Communities served: Kew Gardens, Richmond Hill, South Richmond Hill, South Ozone Park
- Start: Kew Gardens, Queens – Queens Boulevard / Kew Gardens Road & 80th Road
- Via: Lefferts Boulevard (both routes); Rockaway Boulevard, 130th Street (Q10 only)
- End: JFK Airport – Lefferts Boulevard AirTrain station
- Length: 6.1 miles (9.8 km) (Q10); 4.1 miles (6.6 km) (Q80)
- Other routes: Q37 111th Street

Service
- Operates: 24 hours (Note: Limited Service operates only during the day)
- Annual patronage: 3,863,512 (Q10, 2025); 616,722 (Q80, 2025)
- Transfers: Yes
- Timetable: Q10/Q80

The Q10 and Q80 bus routes constitute a public transit line in Queens, New York City, running primarily along Lefferts Boulevard between a transfer with the New York City Subway in Kew Gardens to the AirTrain JFK's Lefferts Boulevard station at John F. Kennedy International Airport. Formerly privately operated by Green Bus Lines as the Q10, the routes are currently city-operated under the MTA Bus Company brand of MTA Regional Bus Operations.

== Route description and service ==
The Q10 and Q80 run along Lefferts Boulevard in south-central Queens, New York City. The Q10 route is a rush route, making limited stops on Lefferts Boulevard before making local stops in South Ozone Park, near its southern terminus. The Q80 route is a local route, running along Lefferts Boulevard for nearly its entire length.

The southbound Q10 and Q80 begin at the Kew Gardens–Union Turnpike subway station at Kew Gardens Road and 80th Road, where transfer is available to the E, F, and <F> trains. They then turn left on 80th Road, and then left onto Austin Street, heading southeast. Afterward, the Q10 and Q80 turn right onto Lefferts Boulevard, where they continue south until Rockaway Boulevard. At this point, Q10 buses turn left onto Rockaway Boulevard to serve the South Ozone Park neighborhood, and then run southwest via 130th Street and east via 150th Avenue. The Q10 turns right along 134th Street, then runs westward via Pan Am Road service road to the AirTrain JFK's Lefferts Boulevard station. Q80 buses take a shorter route, continuing south via Lefferts Boulevard until they terminate at the Lefferts Boulevard AirTrain station.

The northbound Q10 and Q80 begin at the Lefferts Boulevard station. Q80 buses continue directly north, while Q10 buses go east along Pan Am Road, north along 134th Street, west along 150th Avenue, north along 130th Street, west along Rockaway Boulevard, and then north along Lefferts Boulevard. Both the Q10 and Q80 continue north and then northeast until Kew Gardens Road, where they turn left and run to 80th Road.

Until 2006, an express service called the Q10A had run from the Kew Gardens subway station to JFK Airport Terminal 4, via the Van Wyck Expressway, operating non-stop from Kew Gardens to Federal Circle. There were six Q10A trips, all running toward JFK Airport during morning rush hours. The service was replaced by the Q10 Limited (later replaced with the Q10 Rush north of Rockaway Boulevard and the Q80 south of Rockaway Boulevard).

== History ==
=== Early operation ===
The New York City Board of Estimate approved the establishment of the South Ozone Park–Jamaica bus route, running along Lefferts Boulevard and Rockaway Boulevard, circa 1921. The route ran from the intersection of Jamaica Avenue and 114th Street to the Richmond Hill Circle section of South Ozone Park, Queens. In the 1920s, what is now the Q10 was part of the Lefferts–Bergen Landing route, which was operated by the New York City Department of Plant & Structure. The Lefferts–Bergen Landing route ran via Lefferts Boulevard, Rockaway Boulevard, and Old South Road. The Richmond Hill Bus Corporation applied for a franchise to operate this route in 1925.

The Q10 route number was assigned in 1931, traveling primarily along Lefferts Boulevard and Rockaway Boulevard. Originally the Q10 had three destinations; one was at Old South Road, which is at the current intersection of the Belt Parkway and North and South Conduit Avenues at Lefferts, another was at Hamilton Beach, and the final destination was Richmond Hill Circle, which was located about a half-mile south of 130th Street and the Belt Parkway. The trips to Old South Road later went to Rockaway Boulevard. This branch received the most service, with buses running every two minutes during rush hours. Service to Hamilton Beach ran every eight minutes during rush hours. This branch did not run early in the morning, stopping at 1:40 a.m.

On November 11, 1932, the Board of Estimate approved the forms of contract for nine companies, Travelers Bus Company, which had been incorporated on October 9, 1931, and was seeking the franchise for the Q10 bus route. On December 30, 1932, Travelers Bus Lines obtained a one-year franchise for the bus route. The company received a Certificate of Public Convenience and Necessity for the duration of the franchise which became effective on March 17, 1933. On July 4, 1934, the route was extended 3 miles (4.8 km). On June 5, 1935, the city granted a new franchise contract for the extended route for a period lasting between the expiration date of the first contract and a date no later than December 31, 1938.

In 1936, Queens was divided into four zones, for bus operating franchise purposes. With the new zone setup, one company would be awarded the franchise in each zone, with any remaining smaller operations acquired by the larger company. The Q10 fell into Zone C, the zone for Ozone Park, Woodhaven, Richmond Hill, and the Rockaways, and the route was awarded to Green Bus Lines. On November 15, 1936, Q10 service began to be operated by Green Bus Lines, and on this date Travelers Bus Lines ceased operations.

==== Subway and airport connections ====
On March 19, 1941, the terminal loop of the route was changed to provide a safer connection to the Independent Subway System (IND) at Kew Gardens. Originally, Kew Gardens-bound Q10 buses traveled northeast along Lefferts Boulevard before turning left onto Austin Street, right on 80th Road, and then right at Kew Gardens Road, where the buses discharged passengers. Subway commuters had to dodge traffic at Kew Gardens Road, and three traffic deaths at the intersection had occurred during the past few years, leading Councilman James A. Burke to plead for a change in the bus route. As a result, the Police Commissioner, Cornelius O'Leary, changed the direction of traffic on Austin Street between Lefferts Boulevard and 83rd Drive (now Mowbray Drive), and reversed the direction of traffic on 80th Road. With the change, buses continued northeast along Lefferts Boulevard one more block to Kew Gardens Road, terminating on the north side of the street adjacent to the subway entrance. Buses entering service here turned onto 80th Road and then went along Austin Street to Lefferts Boulevard. This terminal loop has remained unchanged as of July 2018.

In 1947, when Idlewild Airport opened, Green Bus Lines was awarded the exclusive transit rights to the airport. The bus was then extended from Richmond Hill Circle to Idlewild Airport. On February 9, 1962, the Board of Estimate approved Green Bus Lines' petition to modify its franchise to create the Q10A express bus route to Idlewild Airport. The fare was 25 cents, and the route ended at the boundary line at the airport. Q10A buses operated along the Van Wyck Expressway and ran only from Kew Gardens to JFK Airport, operating during weekday mornings.

Through the late 20th century, many JFK Airport passengers used the subway and the Q10 as a low-cost alternative to taxi service. According to a 2004 study conducted by Urbitran Associates, the Q10 route operated at a frequency of 12 buses per hour during peak periods. Urbitran's study recommended eliminating the Q10A route and adding a limited-stop variant of the Q10 along Lefferts Boulevard. This would increase the Q10's peak frequency to 18 buses per hour while also providing faster service between the airport and the Lefferts Boulevard corridor in both directions.

=== MTA takeover ===
==== 2000s and 2010s ====
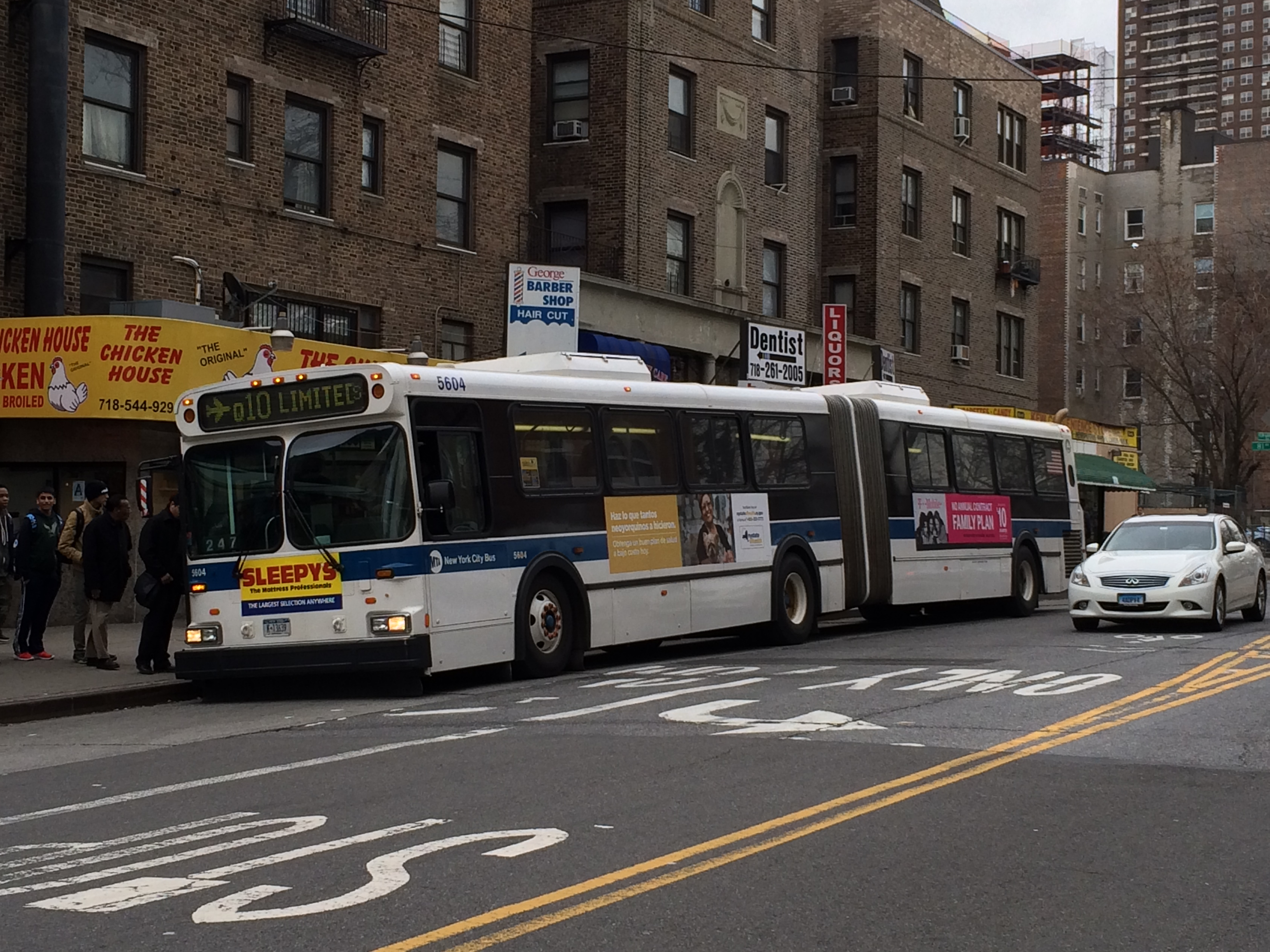
A 2003 New Flyer D60HF (5604) on the Q10 Limited in 2014, after MTA Bus takeover

On January 9, 2006, the MTA Bus Company took over the operations of the Green Bus Line routes. Under the MTA on September 3, 2006, Q10A service was discontinued, due to low ridership and parallel service from the AirTrain JFK. The Q10A was replaced by the Q10 Limited, which made limited stops along the entire route, and ran on weekdays and on Saturdays. At that time, Q10 service to all JFK terminals except Terminal 4 was replaced by AirTrain JFK. On April 6, 2008, limited service was expanded to Sundays and the hours of limited service on weekdays and Saturdays were expanded to increase ridership.

Beginning on September 4, 2011, Q10 local buses on the Lefferts Boulevard branch were rerouted to remain on Lefferts Boulevard south of Conduit Avenue, and to continue along Lefferts Boulevard and Pan Am Road into JFK Airport, where they returned to their regular route along 130th Place. The Conduit Avenue branch of the Q10 was discontinued and Q10 buses stopped accessing JFK Airport at 134th Street.

On May 30, 2012, due to construction at Terminal 4, the Q10 started terminating at a new stop at Terminal 5, near the former Terminal 6.

On February 24, 2013, Q10 short-turn buses terminating at 150th Avenue and 149th Street stopped running via 150th Avenue. Instead, the bus route was changed, with buses running via South Conduit Avenue between 130th Street and 134th Street. The route was changed in order to avoid congestion at the sanitation yard on 150th Street. An additional reason for the change was to allow buses to avoid making a turn onto South Conduit Avenue from 132nd Street, because there is no traffic light at this intersection and vehicles often pass at high speeds, often causing severe delays. Additionally, 132nd Street is a narrow residential block. On April 28, 2013, all Q10 buses that ran via Lefferts Boulevard south of Rockaway Boulevard became limited-stop only, discontinuing stops at Sutter Avenue, 133rd Avenue, and 149th Avenue. A limited bus stop was added at 150th Avenue. At this time, the hours of the Q10 Limited were expanded, running between 5:30 AM–11:30 PM weekdays, and 6:15 AM–11:30 PM on Saturdays and Sundays, similar to former Lefferts Boulevard branch local service hours.

On May 4, 2013, 60-foot (18 m) articulated buses began replacing the standard 40-foot (12 m) buses on the route. The Q10 was the second route in Queens to receive articulated buses, after the Q44. At the time, the Q10 was the third busiest route in the city and its buses were frequently overcrowded. The use of articulated buses received positive feedback from commuters, but opposition from some local residents and business owners to potential traffic issues and loss of parking spaces. With the change to articulated buses, in April 2014, the frequency of service was slightly decreased.

The Q10 Limited was one of several corridors proposed for conversion into a Select Bus Service route in the 2017 Bus Forward report released by the New York City Department of Transportation.

On January 8, 2018, the Q10 was rerouted in JFK Airport in order to provide a more direct route. Two low-volume stops were eliminated as the route was rerouted from 150th Avenue and the Van Wyck Expressway service road to 134th Street. In June 2019, the MTA proposed rerouting the southbound local route between 130th and 134th Street, so that it would run on South Conduit Avenue rather than on 150th and 149th Avenues, since the sanitation yard at 149th Avenue and 134th Street was not an optimal location for a bus stop.

==== Queens bus redesign ====
In December 2019, the MTA released a draft redesign of the Queens bus network. As part of the redesign, the Q10 and Q64 buses would have been replaced by a high-density "intra-borough" route, the QT14, running from Electchester to the Lefferts Boulevard AirTrain station. The local routing, and the limited route south of the AirTrain, would have been eliminated. The redesign was delayed due to the COVID-19 pandemic in New York City in 2020, and the original draft plan was dropped due to negative feedback. In February 2022, the MTA announced that the Q10 local and limited services would be truncated to the Lefferts Boulevard station the next month on March 27 to accommodate long-term construction at JFK Airport. The changes would remain in effect until at least 2026, when JFK's new Central Terminal Area was completed. The discontinued portion of the Q10 would be served by an extension of the Q3 service.

A revised bus-redesign plan was released in March 2022. As part of the new plan, the Q10 would become a "limited-stop" route, albeit with more stops than the existing Q10 Limited. The route would be extended north to Electchester via Queens Boulevard and Jewel Avenue, the same path as the QT14. The local routing in South Ozone Park would be discontinued, and the southern terminal would remain at Lefferts Boulevard AirTrain station.

A final bus-redesign plan was released in December 2023. As with the draft plan, the Q10 would become a limited route and would no longer serve South Ozone Park, but it would not be extended northward or combined with the Q64.

On December 17, 2024, addendums to the final plan were released. The Q10 local branch in South Ozone Park was restored (albeit with a straightened route), becoming a "rush" route with fewer stops. The "limited" branch will be served by a new route, the Q80. On January 29, 2025, the current plan was approved by the MTA Board, and the Queens Bus Redesign went into effect in two different phases during Summer 2025. Both routes are part of Phase II, which began on August 31, 2025. The Q80 was switched from a "Limited" route to a "Local" route.

== Connecting bus routes ==
- QM18 (Express service to/from Midtown via Lefferts Boulevard)
- Q45, Q46, Q48, Q60, QM63, QM64, QM65, QM68 (at Queens Boulevard)
- Q54 (at Metropolitan Avenue)
- Q55, Q56 (at Jamaica Avenue)
- Q24 (at Atlantic Avenue)
- Q8 (at 101st Avenue)
- Q112 (at Liberty Avenue)
- Q41 (at 109th Avenue)
- Q51 (at Linden Boulevard)
- Q7, Q37 (at Rockaway Boulevard/135th Avenue)
- Q9 (at Lincoln Street; Q10 only)
- Q3, B15 (at Lefferts Boulevard AirTrain Station)

== See also ==
- Green Bus Lines
