= Kew Gardens, Queens =

Neighborhood in New York City

Kew Gardens
- Neighborhood of Queens
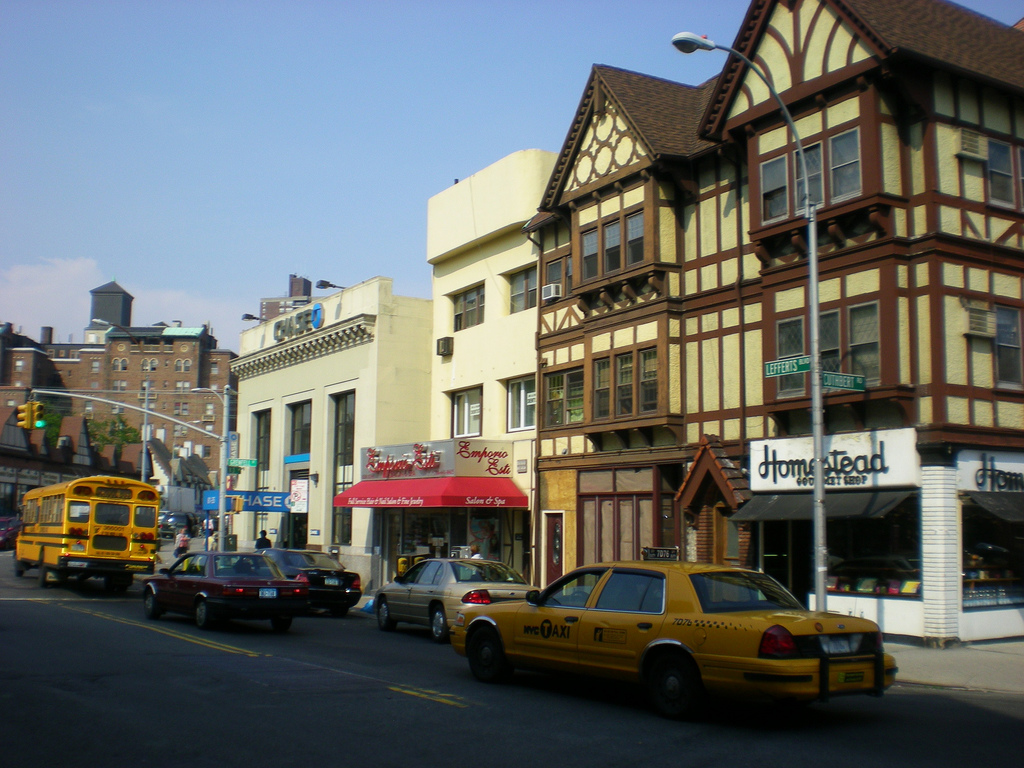
- Businesses on Lefferts Boulevard
- Location within New York City
- Coordinates: 40.705°N 73.825°W
- Country: United States
- State: New York
- City: New York City
- County/Borough: Queens
- Community District: Queens 9
- Named for: Royal Botanic Gardens, Kew

Population (2020)
  - Total: 24,371

Race/Ethnicity
  - White: 40.0%
  - Hispanic: 27.2%
  - Asian: 18.3%
  - Black: 7.8%
  - Other/Multiracial: 6.7%

Economics
  - Median income: $61,287
- Time zone: UTC−5 (EST)
  - Summer (DST): UTC−4 (EDT)
- ZIP Code: 11415
- Area codes: 718, 347, 929, and 917
- Website: www.kewgardens.nyc

Kew Gardens is a neighborhood in the central area of the New York City borough of Queens. Kew Gardens is bounded to the north by the Union Turnpike and the Jackie Robinson Parkway, to the east by the Van Wyck Expressway and 131st Street, to the south by Hillside Avenue, and to the west by Park Lane, Abingdon Road, and 118th Street. Forest Park is to the west and the neighborhood of Forest Hills to the northwest, Flushing Meadows–Corona Park north, Richmond Hill south, Briarwood southeast, and Kew Gardens Hills east.

Kew Gardens is located in Queens Community District 9 and its ZIP Code is 11415. It is patrolled by the New York City Police Department's 102nd Precinct. Politically, Kew Gardens is represented by the New York City Council's 29th District. It is located within New York's 5th congressional district.

== History ==
=== Early development ===
Kew Gardens was one of seven planned garden communities built in Queens from the late 19th century to 1950. Much of the area was acquired in 1868 by Englishman Albon P. Man, who developed the neighborhood of Hollis Hill to the south, chiefly along Jamaica Avenue, while leaving the hilly land to the north undeveloped.

Maple Grove Cemetery on Kew Gardens Road opened in 1875. A Long Island Rail Road station was built for mourners in October and trains stopped there from mid-November. The station was named Hopedale, after Hopedale Hall, a hotel located at what is now Queens Boulevard and Union Turnpike. In the 1890s, the executors of Man's estate laid out the Queens Bridge Golf Course on the hilly terrains south of the railroad. This remained in use until it was bisected in 1908 by the main line of the Long Island Rail Road, which had been moved 600 feet (180 m) to the south to eliminate a curve. The golf course was then abandoned and a new station was built in 1909 on Lefferts Boulevard. Man's heirs, Aldrick Man and Albon Man Jr., decided to lay out a new community and called it at first Kew and then Kew Gardens after the well-known botanical gardens in England. The architects of the development favored English and neo-Tudor styles, which still predominate in many sections of the neighborhood.

=== Urbanization ===
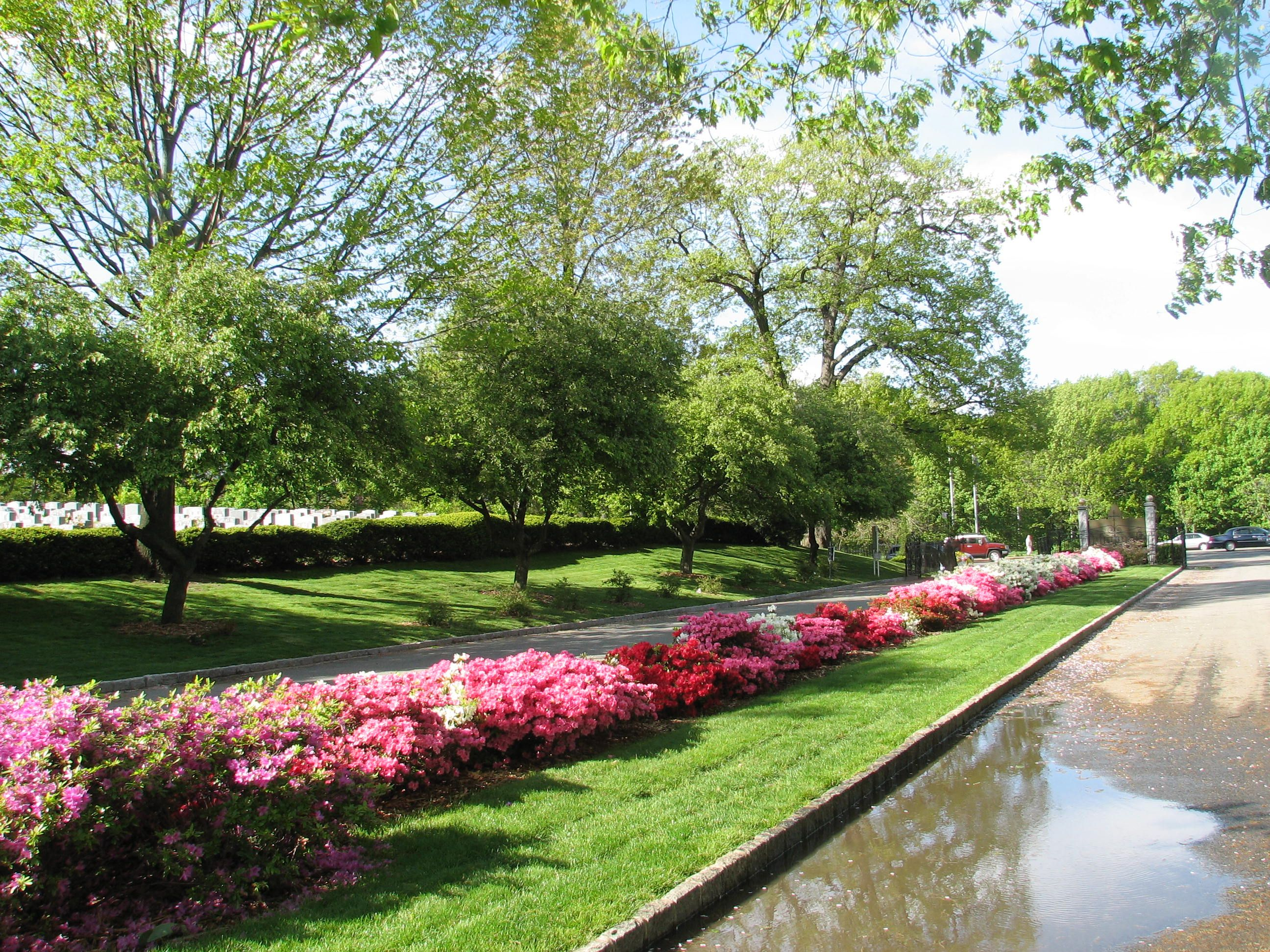
Maple Grove Cemetery entrance on Queens Boulevard

In 1910, the property was sold piecemeal by the estate and during the next few years streets were extended, land graded and water and sewer pipes installed. The first apartment building was the Kew Bolmer at 80-45 Kew Gardens Road, erected in 1915; a clubhouse followed in 1916 and a private school, Kew-Forest School, in 1918. In 1920, the Kew Gardens Inn at the railroad station opened for residential guests, who paid $40 a week for a room and a bath with meals. Elegant one-family houses were built in the 1920s, as were apartment buildings such as Colonial Hall (1921) and Kew Hall (1922) that numbered more than twenty by 1936.

In July 1933, the Grand Central Parkway opened from the Kew Gardens Interchange to the edge of Nassau County. Two years later, the Interboro (now Jackie Robinson) Parkway was opened, linking Kew Gardens to Pennsylvania Avenue in East New York. Since the parkways used part of the roadbed of Union Turnpike, no houses were demolished.

Around the same time, the construction of the Queens Boulevard subway line offered the possibility of quick commutes to the central business district in Midtown Manhattan. In the late 1920s, speculators, upon learning the route of the proposed line, quickly bought up property on and around Queens Boulevard, and real estate prices soared, and older buildings were demolished in order to make way for new development. In order to allow for the speculators to build fifteen-story apartment buildings, several blocks were rezoned. They built apartment building in order to accommodate the influx of residents from Midtown Manhattan that would desire a quick and cheap commute to their jobs. Since the new line had express tracks, communities built around express stations, such as in Forest Hills and Kew Gardens became more desirable to live. With the introduction of the subway into the community of Forest Hills, Queens Borough President George U. Harvey predicted that Queens Boulevard would become the "Park Avenue of Queens". With the introduction of the subway, Forest Hills and Kew Gardens were transformed from quiet residential communities of one-family houses to active population centers. The line was extended from Jackson Heights–Roosevelt Avenue to Kew Gardens–Union Turnpike on December 30, 1936.

Following the line's completion, there was an increase in the property values of buildings around Queens Boulevard. For example, a property along Queens Boulevard that would have sold for $1,200 in 1925, would have sold for $10,000 in 1930. Queens Boulevard, prior to the construction of the subway, was just a route to allow people to get to Jamaica, running through farmlands. Since the construction of the line, the area of the thoroughfare that stretches from Rego Park to Kew Gardens has been home to apartment buildings, and a thriving business district that the Chamber of Commerce calls the "Golden Area".

=== Later years ===
Despite its historical significance, Kew Gardens lacks any landmark protection.

On November 22, 1950, two Long Island Rail Road trains collided in Kew Gardens. The trains collided between Kew Gardens and Jamaica stations, killing 78 people and injuring 363. The crash became the worst railway accident in LIRR history, and one of the worst in the history of New York state.

In 1964, the neighborhood gained news notoriety when Kitty Genovese was murdered near the Kew Gardens Long Island Rail Road station. A New York Times article reported that none of the neighbors responded when she cried for help. The story came to represent the apathy and anonymity of urban life. The circumstances of the case are disputed to this day. It has been alleged that the critical fact reported by The New York Times that "none of the neighbors responded" was false. The case of Kitty Genovese is an oft-cited example of the bystander effect, and the case that originally spurred research on this social psychological phenomenon.

== Land use ==
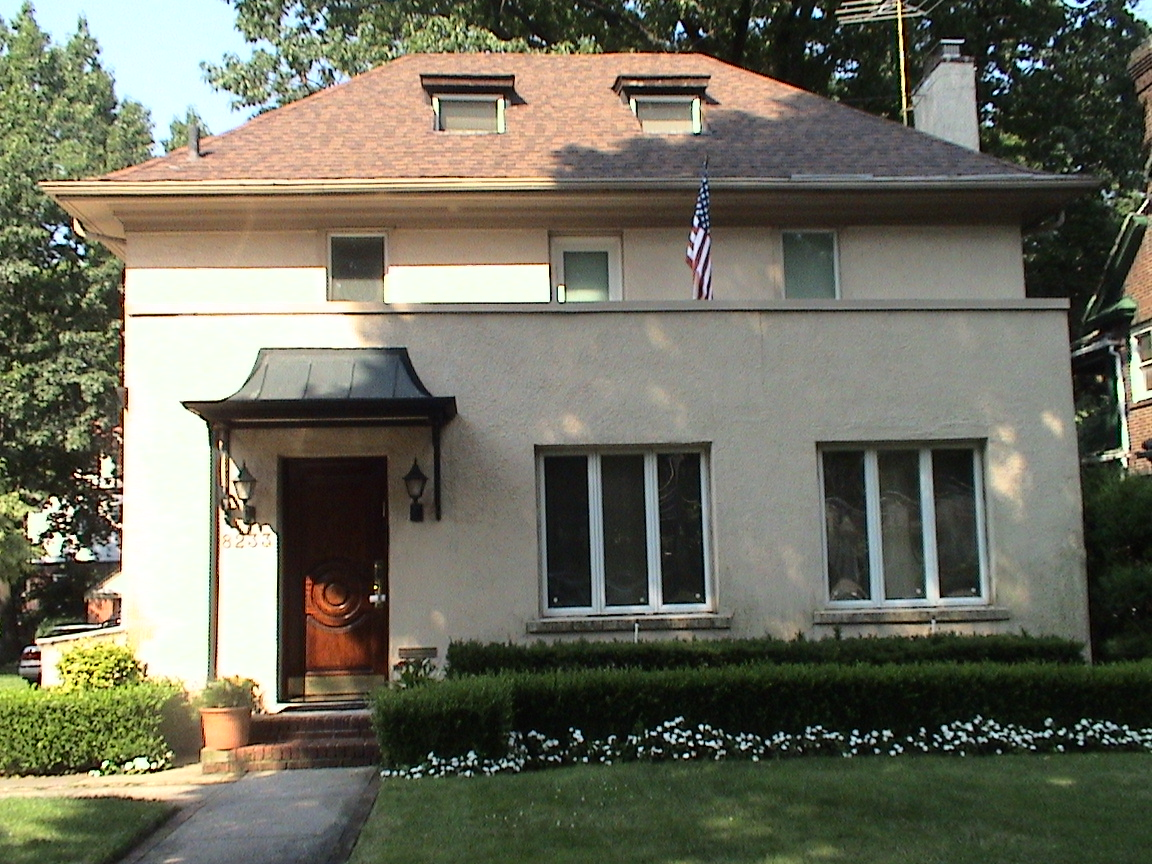
A typical house in Kew Gardens

Kew Gardens remains a densely populated residential community, with a mix of one-family homes, apartments, co-ops and others converted and on the way or being converted as condominiums. A new hotel has been completed on 82nd Avenue, reflecting a modernization of the area. However, it is filled mainly with apartment buildings between four and ten stories high; while many are rentals, some are Housing cooperatives (co-ops). Although there are no New York City Housing Authority complexes in Kew Gardens, Mitchell-Lama buildings provide stabilized rental prices for families or individuals who may need help paying rent. On 83rd Avenue there is a 32-story Mitchell-Lama building. Along the borders of Richmond Hill, Briarwood, and Jamaica, smaller attached houses exist. Many of these are two or three family homes. Expensive single family homes are located around the Forest Park area. However, many owners are selling out their detached homes to developers who teardown and convert them into apartment housing or more expensive, lavish mini-estate houses. This has brought demographic change.

The neighborhood also has many airline personnel because of its proximity to the MTA's Q10 bus line to John F. Kennedy International Airport, as well as to Delta Air Lines, JetBlue Airways and other airlines' special shuttles that serve pilots and flight attendants staying in Kew Gardens.

Kew Gardens's commercial center is Lefferts Boulevard between Austin Street and Metropolitan Avenue. Major attractions include the Kew Gardens Cinemas, a 1930s art deco movie theater that has been converted into a six-screen multiplex and shows a mix of commercial, independent, and foreign films. Lefferts is also home to the only bookstore in central Queens, Kew & Willow Books.

=== Points of interest ===
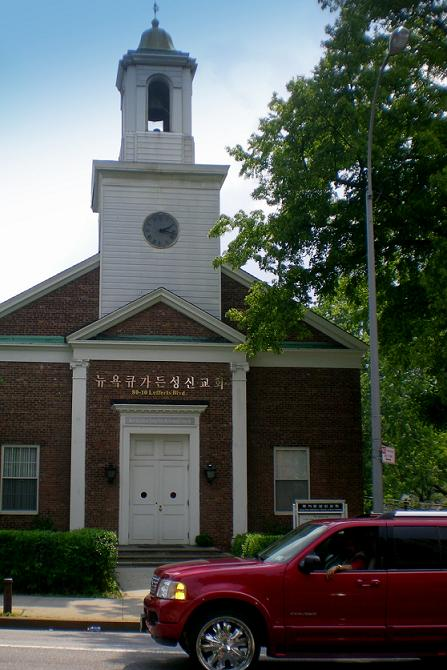
First Church of Kew Gardens

Forest Park is the third-largest park in Queens and is located to the west of Kew Gardens. The Wisconsin Glacier retreated from Long Island some 20,000 years ago, leaving behind the hills that now are part of Forest Park. The park was home to the Rockaway, Delaware and Lenape Native Americans until Dutch West India Company settlers arrived in 1634 and began establishing towns and pushing the tribes out. The park contains the largest continuous oak forest in Queens. Inside the park, the Forest Park Carousel was listed on the National Register of Historic Places in 2004.

In addition to Maple Grove Cemetery, the Ralph Bunche House is listed on the National Register of Historic Places and is also a designated National Historic Landmark.

The county's civic center, Queens Borough Hall, along with one of the county criminal courts, stand at the northern end of the neighborhood, on Queens Boulevard, in a complex extending from Union Turnpike to Hoover Avenue. Adjacent to Borough Hall is a retired New York City Subway R33 (Redbird) which lies on a fake track as well as a platform. Visitors used to be able to go inside the car, but it was closed in 2015 due to lack of visitors and sold in 2022.

== Demographics ==
Based on data from the 2010 United States census, the population of Kew Gardens was 23,278, a decrease of 610 (2.6%) from the 23,888 counted in 2000. Covering an area of 469.74 acres (190.10 ha), the neighborhood had a population density of 49.6 inhabitants per acre (31,700/sq mi; 12,300/km^{2}).

The racial makeup of the neighborhood was 49.3% (11,478) White, 6.5% (1,515) African American, 0.2% (37) Native American, 15.6% (3,628) Asian, 0.0% (11) Pacific Islander, 1.1% (257) from other races, and 3.0% (701) from two or more races. Hispanic or Latino of any race were 24.3% (5,651) of the population.

The entirety of Community Board 9, which comprises Kew Gardens, Richmond Hill, and Woodhaven, had 148,465 inhabitants as of NYC Health's 2018 Community Health Profile, with an average life expectancy of 84.3 years. This is higher than the median life expectancy of 81.2 for all New York City neighborhoods. Most inhabitants are youth and middle-aged adults: 22% are between the ages of between 0–17, 30% between 25–44, and 27% between 45–64. The ratio of college-aged and elderly residents was lower, at 17% and 7% respectively.

As of 2017, the median household income in Community Board 9 was $69,916. In 2018, an estimated 22% of Kew Gardens and Woodhaven residents lived in poverty, compared to 19% in all of Queens and 20% in all of New York City. One in twelve residents (8%) were unemployed, compared to 8% in Queens and 9% in New York City. Rent burden, or the percentage of residents who have difficulty paying their rent, is 55% in Kew Gardens and Woodhaven, higher than the boroughwide and citywide rates of 53% and 51% respectively. Based on this calculation, as of 2018, Kew Gardens and Woodhaven are considered to be high-income relative to the rest of the city and not gentrifying.

=== Demographic changes ===
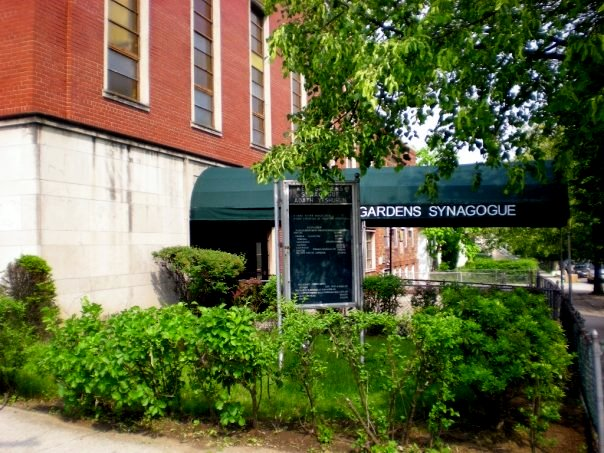
Kew Gardens Synagogue is one of several synagogues and other houses of worship in Kew Gardens, Queens.

The Hispanic and Asian populations in Kew Gardens have grown since the 2000 United States census. At the time, the demographics were 66.2% White, 13.0% Asian, 7.0% African American, 0.3% Native American, and 7.4% of other races. Hispanic or Latino of any race were 20.0% of the population.

Kew Gardens is ethnically diverse. A large community of Jewish refugees from Germany took shape in the area after the Second World War which is reflected still today by the number of active synagogues in the area. The neighborhood attracted many Chinese immigrants after 1965, about 2,500 Iranian Jews arrived after the Iranian Revolution of 1979, and immigrants from China, Pakistan, Iran, Afghanistan, Israel, the former Soviet Union, India, Bangladesh and Korea settled in Kew Gardens during the 1980s and 1990s. Currently, Kew Gardens has a growing population of Bukharian Jews from Uzbekistan, alongside a significant Orthodox Jewish community. Also many immigrants from Central America, and South America call Kew Gardens home, as well as immigrants from Japan.

The increase of the Korean population followed the renovation and rededication of the First Church of Kew Gardens, which offers Korean-language services. In recent years, young professionals and Manhattanites looking for greenery, park-like atmosphere and spacious apartments have moved to the area.

Major development in the neighborhood, such as the construction of new apartment complexes and multi-family homes, has resulted in great demographic change as well. Immigrants from Latin America, Guyana, South Asia and East Asia, and the Middle East (especially Israel), have moved into these new developments. Even the local cuisine reflects this diversity in Kew Gardens, with Russian, Italian, Indian, Pakistani, and Uzbek dining available to residents and visitors. Many religious groups such as Jews, Muslims, and Hindus, can shop at local markets and bazaars that cater to their religious-food needs.

== Economy ==
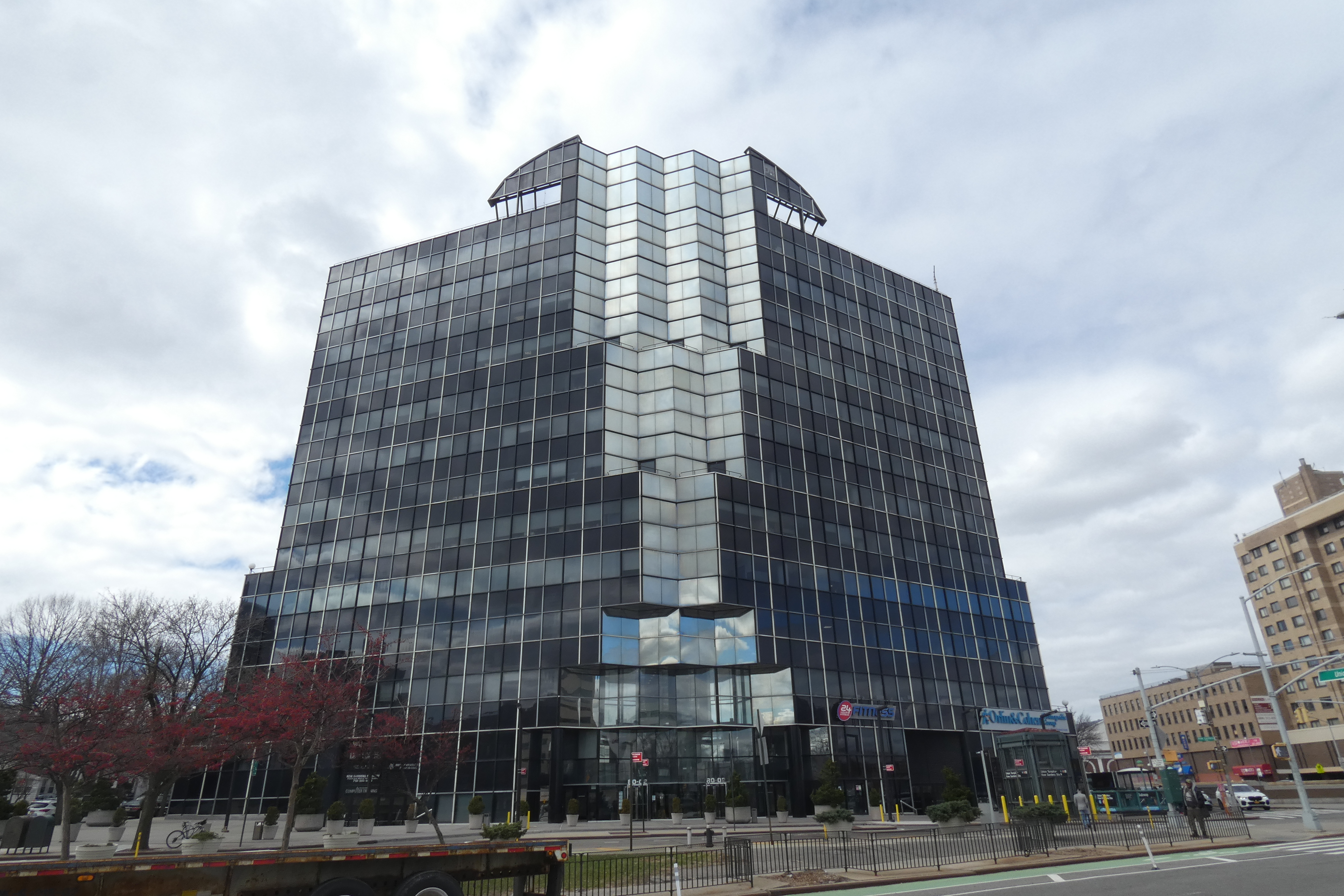
JetBlue's former headquarters at 80-02 Kew Gardens Road

Kew Gardens has many locally owned businesses and restaurants especially on Lefferts Boulevard, Metropolitan Avenue, Austin Street, and Kew Gardens Road. The courthouse is very profitable, as is transportation to the area; however, neither profit the neighborhood directly, but instead serve as an incentive to move to the area. The cost of living in the neighborhood (as of 2015) is $62,900. Pilots and flight attendants who stay in Kew Gardens in between John F. Kennedy International Airport and LaGuardia Airport flights also affect the local economy.

Saudi Arabian Airlines operates an office in Suite 401 at 80–02 Kew Gardens Road in Kew Gardens.

== Police and crime ==
Kew Gardens, Richmond Hill, and Woodhaven are patrolled by the 102nd Precinct of the NYPD, located at 87-34 118th Street. The 102nd Precinct ranked 22nd safest out of 69 patrol areas for per-capita crime in 2010. As of 2018, with a non-fatal assault rate of 43 per 100,000 people, Kew Gardens and Woodhaven's rate of violent crimes per capita is less than that of the city as a whole. The incarceration rate of 345 per 100,000 people is lower than that of the city as a whole.

The 102nd Precinct has a lower crime rate than in the 1990s, with crimes across all categories having decreased by 90.2% between 1990 and 2018. The precinct reported 2 murders, 24 rapes, 101 robberies, 184 felony assaults, 104 burglaries, 285 grand larcenies, and 99 grand larcenies auto in 2018.

== Fire safety ==
There are no fire stations in Kew Gardens itself, but the surrounding area contains two New York City Fire Department (FDNY) fire stations:

- Engine Co. 305/Ladder Co. 151 – 111-02 Queens Boulevard, in Forest Hills
- Squad 270/Division 13 – 91-45 121st Street, in Richmond Hill

== Health ==
As of 2018, preterm births are more common in Kew Gardens and Woodhaven than in other places citywide, though births to teenage mothers are less common. In Kew Gardens and Woodhaven, there were 92 preterm births per 1,000 live births (compared to 87 per 1,000 citywide), and 15.7 births to teenage mothers per 1,000 live births (compared to 19.3 per 1,000 citywide). Kew Gardens and Woodhaven have a higher than average population of residents who are uninsured. In 2018, this population of uninsured residents was estimated to be 14%, slightly higher than the citywide rate of 12%.

The concentration of fine particulate matter, the deadliest type of air pollutant, in Kew Gardens and Woodhaven is 0.0073 milligrams per cubic metre (7.3×10^{−9} oz/ft^{3}), less than the city average. Eleven percent of Kew Gardens and Woodhaven residents are smokers, which is lower than the city average of 14% of residents being smokers. In Kew Gardens and Woodhaven, 23% of residents are obese, 14% are diabetic, and 22% have high blood pressure—compared to the citywide averages of 22%, 8%, and 23% respectively. In addition, 22% of children are obese, compared to the citywide average of 20%.

Eighty-six percent of residents eat some fruits and vegetables every day, which is about the same as the city's average of 87%. In 2018, 78% of residents described their health as "good", "very good", or "excellent", equal to the city's average of 78%. For every supermarket in Kew Gardens and Woodhaven, there are 11 bodegas.

The nearest major hospitals are Long Island Jewish Forest Hills and Jamaica Hospital.

== Post offices and ZIP Code ==
Kew Gardens is covered by the ZIP Code 11415. The United States Post Office operates two post offices nearby:

- Kew Gardens Station – 83-30 Austin Street
- Borough Hall Station – 120-55 Queens Boulevard

== Education ==
Kew Gardens and Woodhaven generally have a lower rate of college-educated residents than the rest of the city as of 2018. While 34% of residents age 25 and older have a college education or higher, 22% have less than a high school education and 43% are high school graduates or have some college education. By contrast, 39% of Queens residents and 43% of city residents have a college education or higher. The percentage of Kew Gardens and Woodhaven students excelling in math rose from 34% in 2000 to 61% in 2011, and reading achievement rose from 39% to 48% during the same time period.

Kew Gardens and Woodhaven's rate of elementary school student absenteeism is less than the rest of New York City. In Kew Gardens and Woodhaven, 17% of elementary school students missed twenty or more days per school year, lower than the citywide average of 20%. Additionally, 79% of high school students in Kew Gardens and Woodhaven graduate on time, more than the citywide average of 75%.

=== Schools ===
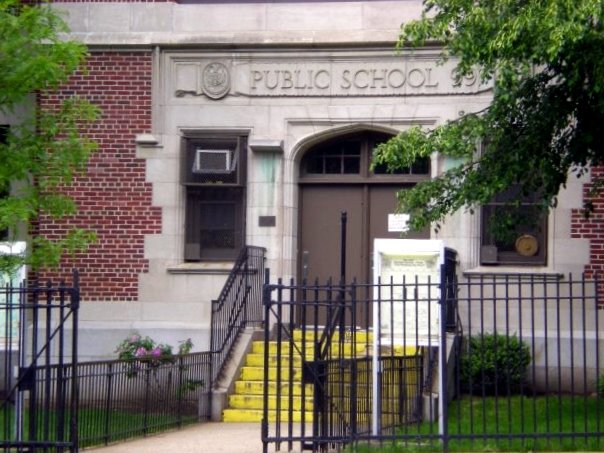
PS 99 Main Building on Kew Gardens Road

Private schools in Kew Gardens include Yeshiva Tifereth Moshe, Bais Yaakov of Queens, and Yeshiva Shaar HaTorah. The only public school in Kew Gardens is PS 99.

=== Libraries ===
The Queens Public Library operates two branches near Kew Gardens:

- The Richmond Hill branch at 118-14 Hillside Avenue
- The Briarwood branch at 85-12 Main Street

== Transportation ==
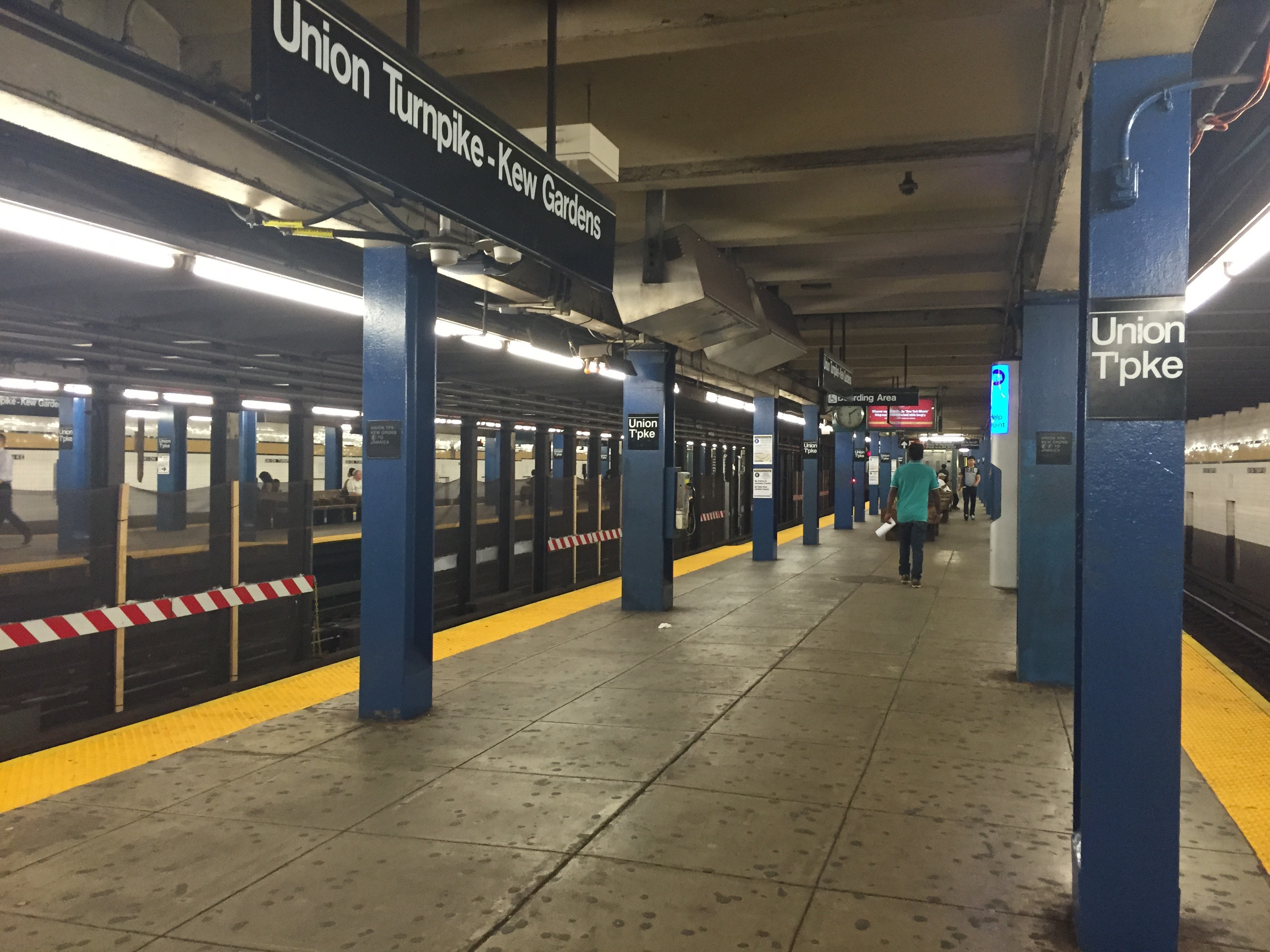
The Kew Gardens subway station

The neighborhood is served by the New York City Subway's E, F, and <F> trains at the Kew Gardens–Union Turnpike subway station, and by the J and Z trains at the 121st Street subway station. In addition, Long Island Rail Road's City Terminal Zone stops at the Kew Gardens station. New York City Bus routes include the Q10, Q37, Q45, Q46, Q48, Q54, Q60 and Q80 local routes, as well as express bus routes to Manhattan.

The neighborhood is accessible by car from Interstate 678 (Van Wyck Expressway), Grand Central Parkway, Jackie Robinson Parkway, Queens Boulevard, and Union Turnpike. These all intersect at the Kew Gardens Interchange.

== Notable people ==
Category:People from Kew Gardens, Queens Notable residents of Kew Gardens include:

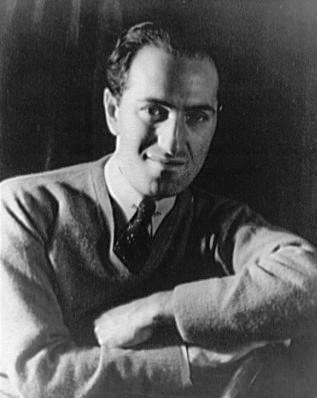
George Gershwin

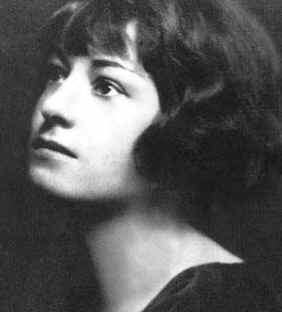
Dorothy Parker

- Grace Albee (1890–1985), printmaker and wood engraver
- Burt Bacharach (1928–2023) Award-winning pianist, composer and producer grew up in Kew Gardens
- Crosby Bonsall (1921–1995) artist and children's book author and illustrator
- Maud Ballington Booth (1865–1948), Volunteers of America co-founder
- Joshua Brand (born 1950), television writer, director and producer, grew up in Kew Gardens
- Ralph Bunche (1903–1971), diplomat and Nobel Peace Prize winner
- Rudolf Callmann (1892–1976), German American legal scholar and expert in the field of German and American competition law who assisted Jewish refugees from Nazi Germany
- Ron Carey (1936–2008), labor leader who served as president of the International Brotherhood of Teamsters from 1991 to 1997
- Charlie Chaplin (1889–1977), actor, lived at 105 Mowbray Drive in 1919–1922
- Rodney Dangerfield (1921–2004), comedian who lived above the Austin Ale House
- Rona Elliot (born 1947), music journalist, grew up in Kew Gardens
- Lloyd Espenschied (1889-1986), electrical engineer who co-invented the modern coaxial cable
- Kitty Genovese (1935-1964), Italian American bartendress raped and murdered outside her apartment complex in an incident that prompted a social psychological theory named the "bystander effect"
- George Gershwin (1898–1937), composer
- Bernhard Goetz (born 1947), best known for shooting four young black men on the subway in 1984
- Ladislav Hecht (1909–2004), Jewish professional tennis player, well known for representing Czechoslovakia in the Davis Cup during the 1930s
- Miriam Hopkins (1902–1972), actress
- Frederick Jagel (1897-1982), tenor, primarily active at the Metropolitan Opera in the 1930s and 1940s
- Rabbi Paysach Krohn (born 1945), rabbi and author, has lived in Kew Gardens
- Shlomo Levinger (born 1997), magician and mentalist, grew up in Kew Gardens
- Norman Lewis (1915–2006), Olympic fencer
- Josef Lhevinne (1874–1944), concert pianist
- Rosina Lhévinne (1880-1976), pianist and pedagogue
- Robert H. Lieberman, filmmaker, grew up in Kew Gardens
- Saul Marantz (1911-1997), designed and built the first Marantz audio product at his home in Kew Gardens
- Peter Mayer (1936–2018), former Penguin Books CEO, grew up in Kew Gardens
- Anaïs Nin (1903–1977), author
- Dorothy Parker (1893–1967), poet
- Will Rogers Sr. (1879–1935), actor
- Will Rogers Jr. (1911–1993), congressman and son of Will Rogers Sr.
- Michael Rosensweig (born 1956), senior Rosh Yeshiva and Rosh Kollel at Yeshiva University
- Nelson Saldana, track cycling champion
- Ossie Schectman (1919–2013), basketball guard, who is credited with having scored the first basket in the Basketball Association of America, which would later become the National Basketball Association
- Robert Schimmel (1950–2010), comedian, grew up in Kew Gardens
- Jerry Springer (1944–2023), talk show host and former mayor of Cincinnati, Ohio
- Carol Montgomery Stone (1915–2011), actress and daughter of actor Fred Stone, grew up in Kew Gardens
- Sim Van der Ryn (1935–2024), architect, researcher and educator, who has applied principles of physical and social ecology to architecture and environmental design
- Dick Van Patten (1928–2015), actor, best known for his role on the television comedy-drama Eight Is Enough
- S. Howard Voshell (1888–1937), professional tennis player and later a promoter
- Robert C. Wertz (1932–2009), politician who served for 32 years as a member of the New York State Assembly

== Gallery ==
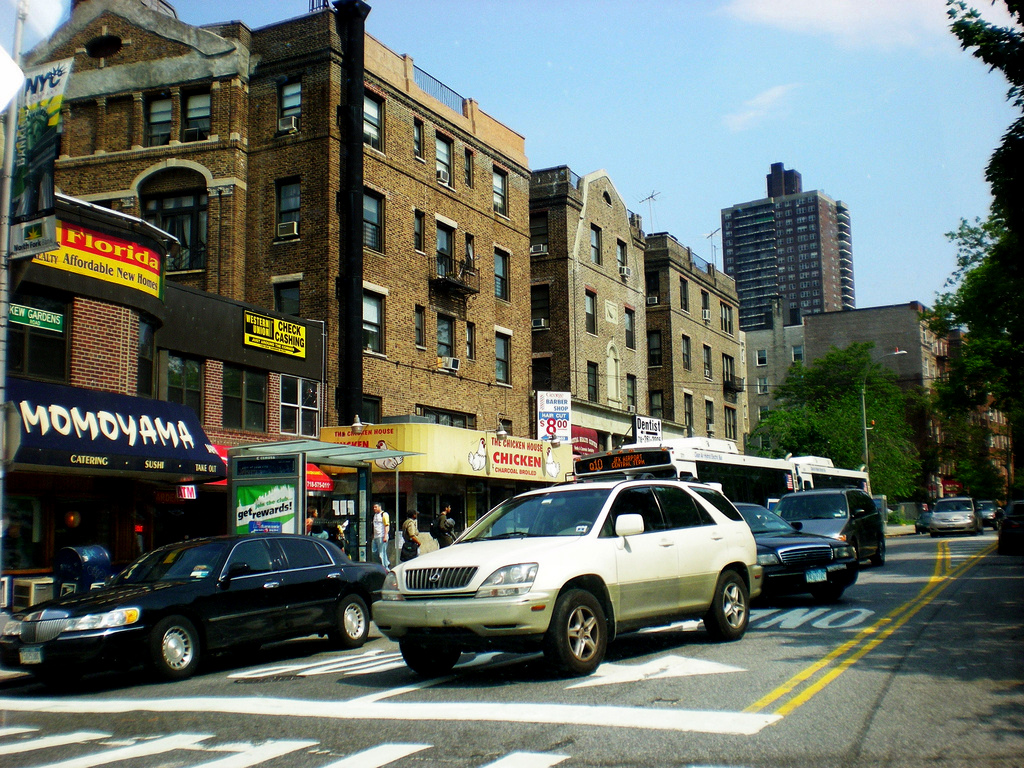
Shops on Kew Gardens Road

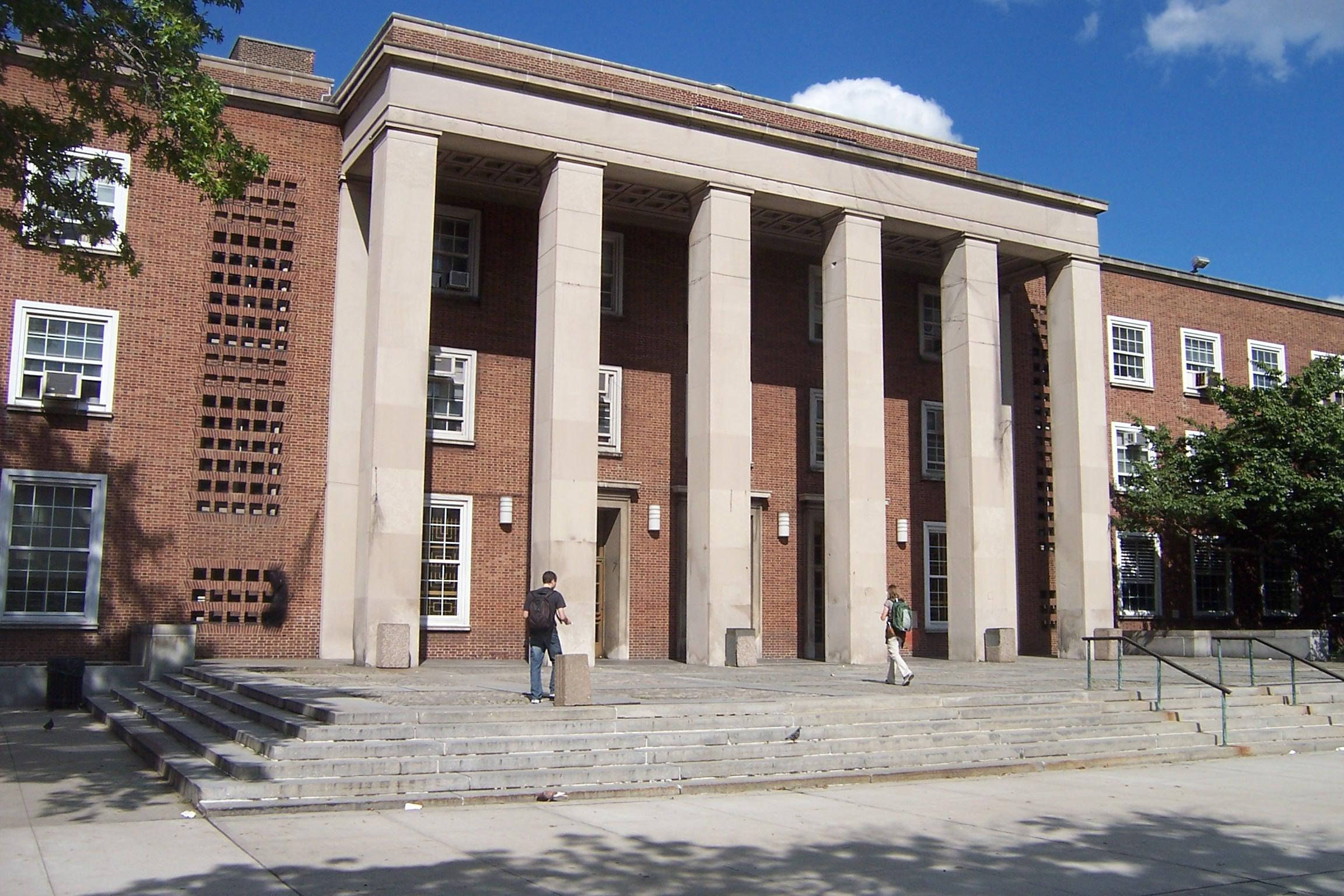
Queens Borough Hall

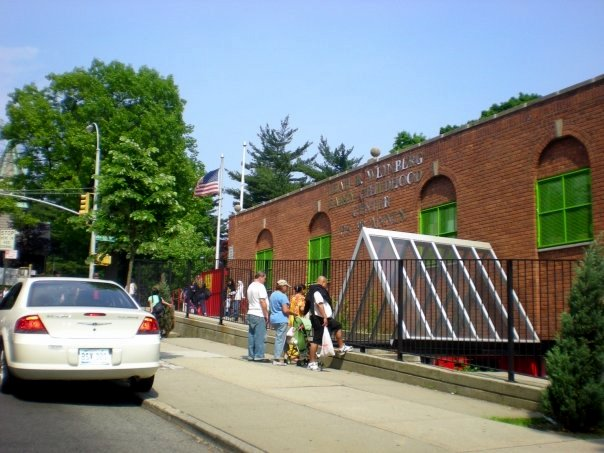
P.S. 99 school annex

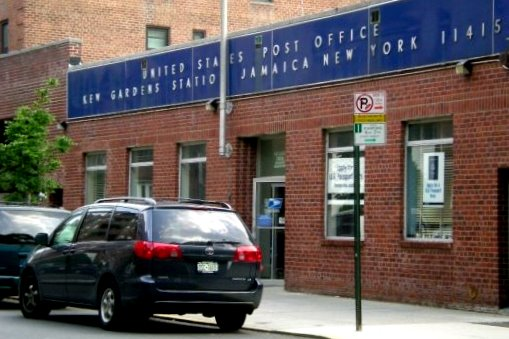
Kew Gardens Post Office

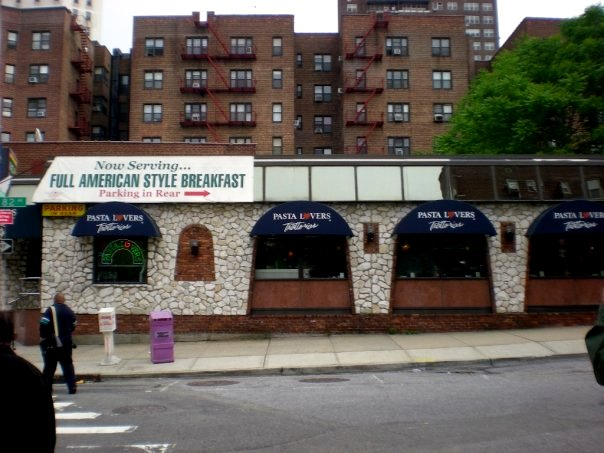
A restaurant in Kew Gardens
