= Myrtle =

Myrtle may refer to:

== Plants ==
- Myrtaceae, the myrtle family
  - Myrtus, the myrtle genus
- List of plants known as myrtle, including a list of trees and plants known as myrtle

== In geography ==
=== Canada ===
- Myrtle, Ontario, a community

=== United States ===
- Myrtle, Kansas, a former settlement
- Myrtle, Minnesota, a city
- Myrtle, Mississippi, a town
- Myrtle, Missouri, an unincorporated community
- Myrtle, West Virginia, an unincorporated community
- Myrtle Creek (Curry County, Oregon), a stream
- Myrtle Creek (South Umpqua River tributary), a stream in Oregon
- Myrtle Point, Oregon, a town in Oregon

== People and fictional characters ==
- Myrtle (given name), including a list of people and fictional characters with the given name or nickname
- Chip Myrtle (1945–2022), American National Football League player

== Roads ==
- Myrtle Avenue, New York City
- Myrtle Avenue, Hounslow, in the London Borough of Hounslow
- Myrtle Road, Sheffield, England, former home ground of The Wednesday Football Club on the street of the same name

== Other uses ==
- USS Myrtle, various United States Navy ships
- Myrtle (sternwheeler), a steamboat in Oregon in the early 20th century
- "The Myrtle", an Italian literary fairy tale
- "Myrtle" (Superstore), an episode of TV series Superstore
- Myrtle (color), a shade of the color green

== See also ==
- Myrtle Bank (disambiguation)
- Myrtle Beach, South Carolina
- Myrtle Creek (disambiguation), includes both communities and actual creeks
- Myrtle Grove (disambiguation)
- Myrtle Hill (disambiguation)
- Myrtles Plantation, Louisiana
- Myrtle Point, Oregon
- Myrtle Township (disambiguation)
