= Q55 =

Q55 may refer to:

- Q55 (New York City bus)
- Ar-Rahman, the 55th surah of the Quran
- French submarine Prairial
