= Myrtle Avenue Line =

Myrtle Avenue Line may refer to the following public transit lines:

- BMT Myrtle Avenue Line, a fully elevated line of the New York City Subway
- Myrtle Avenue Line (surface), a surface transit line on Myrtle Avenue, Brooklyn, New York
- Q55 (New York City bus), or Richard Hill Line, a surface transit line on Myrtle Avenue in Queens, New York
