= Myrtle Avenue =

Avenue in Brooklyn and Queens, New York

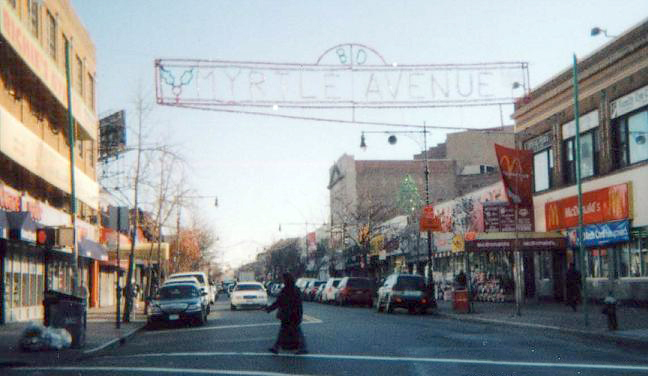
- The Myrtle Avenue Business Improvement District in Ridgewood
- Interactive map of Myrtle Avenue
- Owner: City of New York
- Maintained by: NYCDOT
- Length: 8.1 mi (13.0 km)
- Location: Brooklyn, Queens
- Nearest metro station: Jay Street; Myrtle–Willoughby Avenues; Myrtle Avenue; Central Avenue; Knickerbocker Avenue; Myrtle–Wyckoff Avenues
- West end: Duffield Street in Downtown Brooklyn
- Major junctions: Jackie Robinson Parkway in Forest Park
- East end: Jamaica Avenue in Richmond Hill

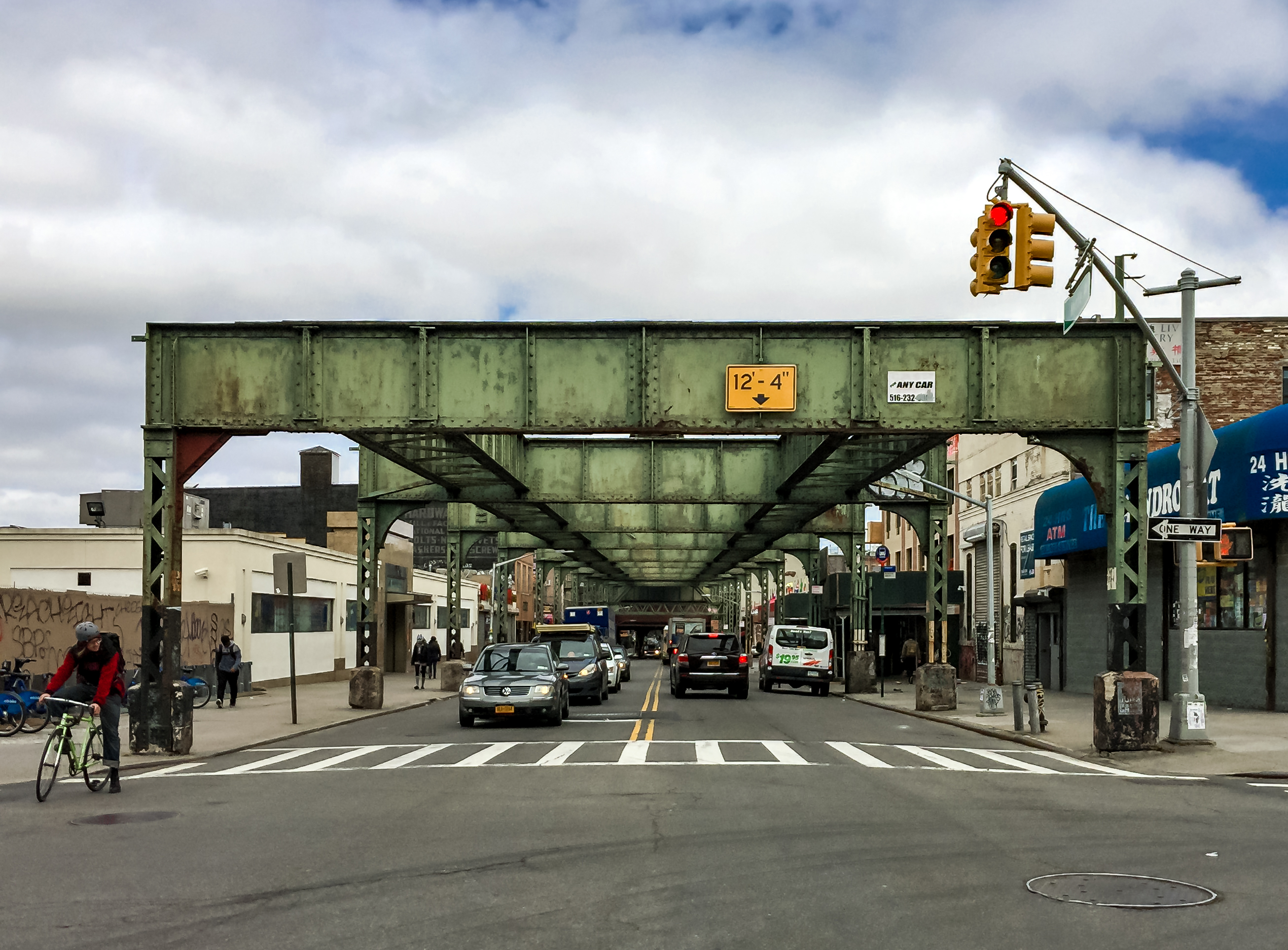
Myrtle Avenue at Lewis Avenue, showing a remaining portion of the Myrtle Avenue Elevated train left standing after the line's western portion was demolished in October 1969

Myrtle Avenue is a 8.1-mile-long (13.0 km) street that runs from Duffield Street in Downtown Brooklyn to Jamaica Avenue in Richmond Hill, Queens, in New York City, United States. Myrtle is a main thoroughfare through the neighborhoods of Fort Greene, Clinton Hill, Bedford-Stuyvesant, Bushwick, Ridgewood, and Glendale.

== Route description ==
=== Brooklyn ===
In the neighborhoods of Fort Greene and Clinton Hill, the development of Myrtle Avenue was directly related to the Brooklyn Navy Yard, built in 1801. In 1847 Fort Greene Park, Brooklyn's first park, was built on the south side of western Myrtle Avenue. It was a busy thoroughfare since early on in its existence. During World War II, the Navy Yard employed more than 71,000 people, many of them African American shipbuilders. As a result, the demand for housing in the area increased, prompting the New York City Housing Authority to build the Walt Whitman and Raymond Ingersoll public housing on Myrtle Avenue in 1944.

In the 1970s, the decommissioning of Brooklyn Navy Yard and demolition of much of the Myrtle Avenue Elevated train line, along with an influx of poorer residents into the Bedford-Stuyvesant and Bushwick neighborhoods, led to a decline in the vitality of the avenue, with business closures and increased crime. At its nadir of decline, the street became jokingly known to many Brooklynites as "Murder Avenue".

In the 1990s the western end of Myrtle Avenue was closed from Jay Street to Flatbush Avenue Extension to create the pedestrian-only MetroTech Center. Adding to the MetroTech Center's revitalization of the neighborhood, a modern revitalization movement is in effect by a collaboration of community organizations like the Myrtle Avenue Revitalization Project LDC (MARP), the Myrtle Avenue Brooklyn Improvement district BID, and the Myrtle Avenue Merchants Association. Some parts of Myrtle Avenue, for example around Pratt Institute, have become a main street of commerce, with many trendy restaurants and boutique retail shops.

In the 21st century the economic revitalization of Brooklyn and gentrification in Williamsburg, Clinton Hill, and Bushwick have increased commercial prosperity on the Brooklyn stretch of Myrtle. Today many sections of the avenue, especially in Fort Greene, Clinton Hill, and adjacent areas are lined with shops, bars, and restaurants and have been commercially revitalized.

=== Queens ===
Myrtle Avenue has been a major thoroughfare since the early 19th century, named after the myrtle trees that were plentiful in the area. Most likely, Myrtle Avenue began in Queens and was a plank road that charged a toll. The road eventually hosted the Knickerbocker Stage Coach Line, that ran stagecoach and omnibus services. After World War I, Myrtle Avenue in Glendale was a popular destination for picnickers. With a steam trolley running on the avenue, and its ample adjacent beer gardens and park space, people from as far as Eastern Brooklyn came to Myrtle. In the mid-1920s, the parks closed as a result of Prohibition. Ultimately, the parks became incorporated by the city into what is known today as Forest Park.

Currently, Myrtle Avenue is one of the primary shopping strips of Ridgewood, along with Fresh Pond Road whose south end is at Myrtle Avenue. It is also the primary shopping strip in nearby Glendale, although this stretch of Myrtle Avenue is not as busy as the Ridgewood stretch. It was also home to the Ridgewood Theatre, which was the longest continuously operated theater in the United States, having operated for 91 years before its closure in March 2008.

Myrtle Avenue is the starting point for several major thoroughfares in Queens that were built later. This includes Union Turnpike, whose west end is in Glendale just west of Woodhaven Boulevard, and Hillside Avenue, which starts off from Myrtle Avenue in Richmond Hill near Lefferts Boulevard.

== Transportation ==
The M train of the New York City Subway currently runs above Myrtle Avenue through Bushwick and a small stretch through Bedford-Stuyvesant. Formerly, the Myrtle Avenue El was an elevated railroad line that ran along Myrtle Avenue. The completed line ran from Middle Village to Downtown Brooklyn and Park Row, Manhattan, using the avenue for most of its route. Since 1969, the portion of the line west of the Myrtle Avenue – Broadway station was demolished, while the rest of the line east of the Myrtle Avenue - Broadway station remains.

Myrtle Avenue is currently served by the following subway stations, west to east:

- Myrtle–Willoughby Avenues (G train)
- Myrtle Avenue (J, M, and Z trains)
- Central Avenue (M train)
- Knickerbocker Avenue (M train)
- Myrtle–Wyckoff Avenues; a station complex consisting of:
  - Myrtle–Wyckoff Avenues (L train)
  - Myrtle–Wyckoff Avenues (M train)

Also, DeKalb Avenue (B, D, N, Q, R, and W trains) and 121st Street (J and Z trains) are stations near the avenue. There is an abandoned subway station on the BMT Brighton Line directly under Myrtle Avenue; it was closed in 1957 due to a track reconfiguration north of DeKalb Avenue.

Myrtle Avenue is also served by the following bus routes:

- The Q55 is designated “Myrtle Avenue (East)”, and serves the corridor east of Gates Avenue (Ridgewood), and from Palmetto to 117th Streets (Richmond Hill).
- The B54 is designated “Myrtle Avenue” (“Myrtle Avenue (Brooklyn)” on Queens maps), and serves the corridor from Flatbush Avenue Extension to Palmetto Street (Ridgewood), and west of Gates Avenue (Downtown Brooklyn).
- Both aforementioned buses serve Ridgewood Terminal, which is also served by the B13, B26, B52, Q58 and Q98 and is located near the Myrtle–Wyckoff Avenues subway station.
- Express bus service on the avenue is provided by the QM24, QM25, and QM34 buses, between Fresh Pond Road and their terminus at 73rd Place, with Manhattan service originating at 73rd Street.
- Ridgewood-bound Q58 and Q98 buses run on the corridor from Catalpa Avenue to Putnam Avenue.
- At Fresh Pond Road, the B13 runs either from 62nd Street (Wyckoff Hts Hosp) or to 61st Street (Gateway Mall), and the B20 runs either from Decatur Street (Ridgewood-Forest Av) or to Summerfield Street (Postal Facility).
- The Q37 runs between 111th Street and Park Lane South.
- The Q29 uses the avenue from 80th Street to 81st Street to change its direction from Glendale to Jackson Heights.

== In popular culture ==
There are references to Myrtle Avenue in hip-hop culture and rap music, reflective of the street passing through African American neighborhoods in Brooklyn. The popularity of the nickname "Murder Avenue" dates back to the minor 1993 hit of the same name by the Geto Boys.

Other artists that mention Myrtle Avenue include:

- Nas refers to Willoughby and Myrtle Ave in the song "Virgo" with Ludacris and Doug E. Fresh.
- Prodigy from Mobb Deep references Myrtle in "Trife Life" on The Infamous album.
- Mos Def says he's from Myrtle and Broadway in the song "Champion Requiem" on The New Danger, and in the song "Mathematics" on Black on Both Sides.
- Talib Kweli references the street in the Black Eyed Peas' song "Like That" - "Like a caribou running down Myrtle Avenue".
- Digable Planets reference the avenue in the song "9th Wonder (Blackitolism)" when Butterfly rhymes - "Myrtle Ave A Train got the pick in my hair".
- Prince Paul references Myrtle Avenue in his song "People, Places & Things".
- Lord Jamar refers to Myrtle Avenue in the Brand Nubian song "Straight Off Tha Head"
- Henry Miller wrote about the horrible conditions of Myrtle Avenue in his 1939 novel Tropic of Capricorn.
- Tory Lanez references Myrtle Avenue as the birthplace of a character in his song "Pieces" from his album Memories Don't Die.
