= Myrtle–Wyckoff Avenues station =

New York City Subway station

Myrtle–Wyckoff Avenues
- New York City Subway station complex
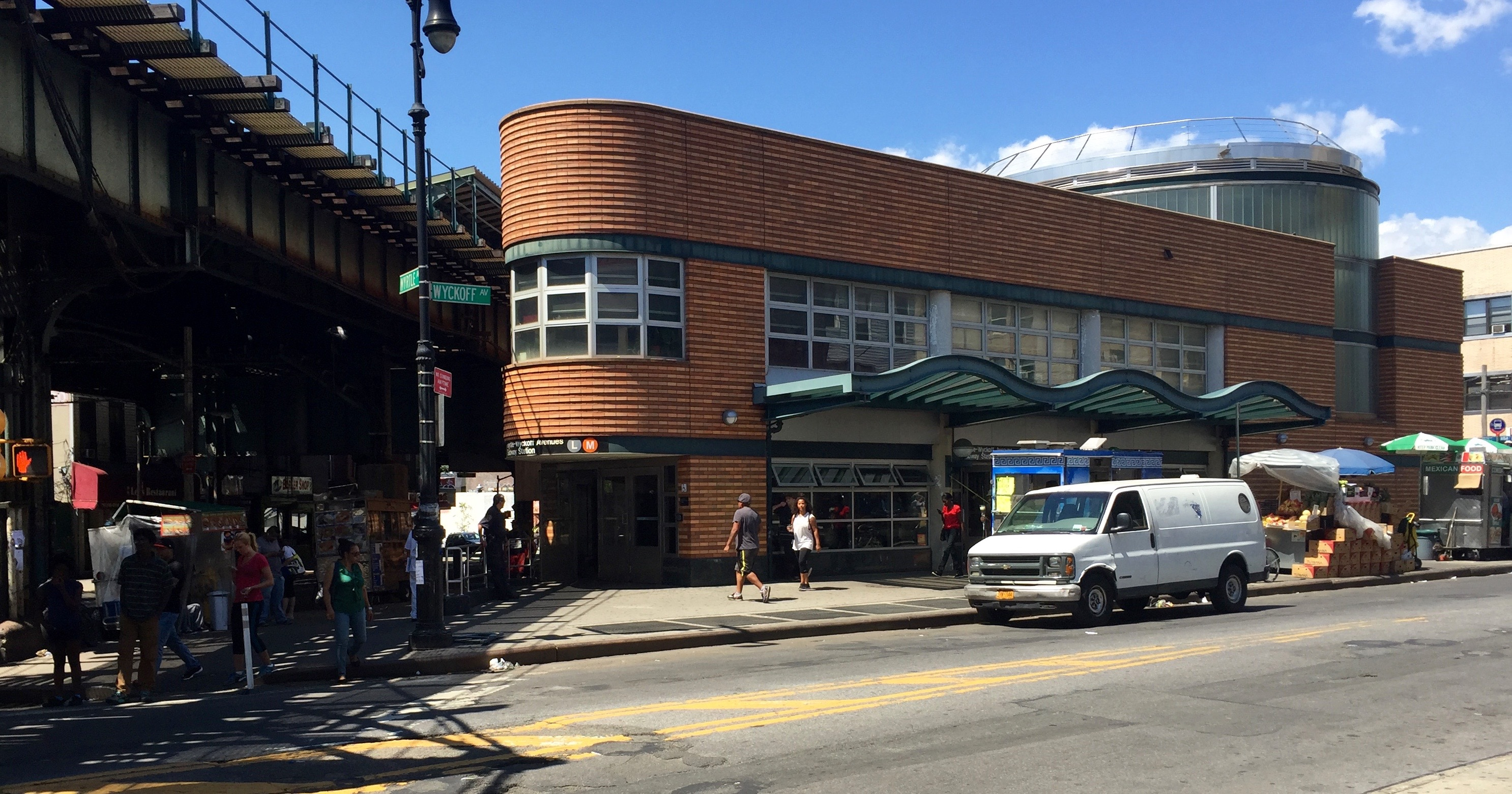
- Head house, northwest corner of Wyckoff and Myrtle

Station statistics
- Address: Myrtle Avenue & Wyckoff Avenue; Brooklyn, New York
- Borough: On the border of Brooklyn and Queens
- Locale: Bushwick, Brooklyn; Ridgewood, Queens
- Coordinates: 40.699511°N 73.911166°W
- Division: B (BMT)
- Line: BMT Canarsie Line; BMT Myrtle Avenue Line
- Services: L (all times); M (all times)
- Transit: New York City Bus: B13, B26, B52, B54, Q55, Q58, Q98
- Levels: 2

Other information
- Accessible: Yes

Traffic
- 2025: 5,562,014 ▲6.6%
- Rank: 52 out of 423
Location
Location within New York City Subway
Location within New York City
Location within New York
Street map
Station service legend
Symbol	Description
Stops all times	Stops all times

The Myrtle–Wyckoff Avenues station (announced on New Technology Trains as the Myrtle Avenue–Wyckoff Avenue station) is a New York City Subway station complex formed by the intersecting stations of the BMT Canarsie Line and the BMT Myrtle Avenue Line, served by the L and M trains at all times. It is located at Myrtle and Wyckoff Avenues in the Bushwick neighborhood of Brooklyn and the Ridgewood neighborhood of Queens (since Wyckoff Avenue between Gates Avenue and Eldert Street forms the border between Brooklyn and Queens). The complex is connected by a set of stairs and several elevators and escalators between the elevated and underground levels. The station was renovated completely from 2004 to 2008.

Since many buses stop there, the MTA opened the Ridgewood Intermodal Terminal on August 20, 2010. Palmetto Street was shuttered to all traffic except for buses in order for the B26, B52, B54, Q55, Q58 and Q98 buses to terminate closer together on different parts of the street, and to increase accessibility and convenience for buses and subway transfers. However, neither the elevated BMT Myrtle Avenue Line nor the underground BMT Canarsie Line terminate here, merely the bus lines, excluding the B13, which passes on Gates Avenue, one street west away from the terminal on Palmetto Street.

== History ==
=== Myrtle Avenue Line station ===
Wyckoff Avenue station on the Myrtle Avenue Line opened on July 20, 1889, with a single island platform and two tracks. The station was located past the curve to the east of the current station. The line was subsequently extended in 1906 to the street level right-of-way to Metropolitan Avenue, and again in the 1910s during the Dual Contracts era onto the present elevated structure.

On July 29, 1914, the station was reconfigured to two island platforms to accommodate a new express track to Broadway – Myrtle Avenue. (The remainder of the line east of this station has always been a two-track configuration.) When the elevated was rebuilt to three tracks, the BMT Canarsie Line was still planned to be on an elevated line between Montrose Avenue and Broadway Junction. The express track was in anticipation of a potentially different service pattern and the anticipation of a Canarsie Line on Wyckoff Avenue that would have had track connections just east of this station between the two lines.

=== Canarsie Line station ===
==== Background ====
The Dual Contracts also called for a subway line initially known as the 14th Street–Eastern District Line, usually shortened to 14th Street–Eastern Line. The line would run beneath 14th Street in Manhattan, from Sixth Avenue under the East River and through Williamsburg to Montrose and Bushwick Avenues in Brooklyn. Booth and Flinn was awarded the contract to construct the line on January 13, 1916. Clifford Milburn Holland served as the engineer-in-charge during the construction.

Due to the city's failure to approve the section of the line between Montrose Avenue and East New York, the 14th Street/Eastern Line was initially isolated from the rest of the system. In 1924, a temporary connection was built from the Long Island Rail Road (LIRR)'s Bushwick Yard that ran via Montrose Avenue and then connected to the 14th Street/Eastern Line under Bushwick Avenue near the Montrose Avenue station. This was done to allow the delivery of BMT Standard subway cars. The first of the cars were delivered by this ramp on June 20, 1924. On June 30, 1924, the section between Sixth Avenue in Manhattan and Montrose Avenue in Brooklyn opened.

==== Construction and opening ====
For the extension of the 14th Street/Eastern Line from Montrose Avenue to East New York, the New York City Board of Estimate had initially given its consent to an elevated line over the Evergreen Branch of the LIRR. The Board of Estimate subsequently refused to allow a construction contract for the elevated line, while the BRT did not want to build an underground line. The extension was changed to an underground alignment following opposition from industries on the Evergreen Branch. In July 1924, the New York City Board of Transportation (BOT) approved a modified route for recommendation to the Board of Estimate. The route would be wholly underground and consist of three tracks. From Montrose Avenue, it would curve east under McKibbin Street, private property, and Harrison Place. Past Varick Avenue, it would turn southeast to Wyckoff Avenue, underneath which it would run to Eldert Street. This plan was to cost $8 million.

In September 1924, the BOT approved the remaining section of the route between Eldert Street and Broadway Junction in East New York. East of Eldert Street, the route would turn south to a ground-level alignment parallel to the LIRR's Bay Ridge Branch, then run southeast in a tunnel underneath private property to the intersection of Eastern Parkway and Bushwick Avenue, where it would emerge onto a ramp leading to the existing Canarsie elevated. An ornamental viaduct over Bushwick Avenue and Eastern Parkway was removed from the original plans due to opposition from property owners.

Three contracts for the construction of the extension were awarded in December at a total cost of $9,531,204. The section from Montrose Avenue to Varick Avenue was awarded to the Underpinning and Foundation Company, while the section from Varick Avenue to Bleecker Street and from Bleecker Street to Halsey Street went to the Oakdale Contracting Company.

On July 14, 1928, the line was extended further east beneath Wyckoff Avenue and then south paralleling the Bay Ridge Branch to a new station at Broadway Junction, above the existing station on the Broadway Elevated (Jamaica Line). At this time, it was connected to the already-operating elevated line to Canarsie. The Myrtle Avenue station opened as part of this extension.

=== Station renovations ===
By 1946, the center track was removed, and the two platforms were joined by a wooden walkway near the station's two staircases, which was later replaced by a concrete connection. Railings were installed where the center track right of way remained exposed. In the 2000s station reconstruction, the double staircases were replaced with a single wide staircase. This staircase, located toward the north end of the station, is the station's only connection to the rest of the complex.

Beginning in 2004, the station underwent rehabilitation that included structural steel repairs and significant expansion. The work, completed by Judlau Contracting in May 2008, cost $51 million. From 2000 to 2008, Dattner Architects had a joint venture with Parsons Brinckerhoff to build the station's new station building. On April 19, 2007, the newly expanded main station building at the triangle of Myrtle, Gates and Wyckoff Avenues was formally opened. Improvements to the complex included lighting upgrades, stairway reconfigurations, new interior finishes, and a new communication system. In the fall of 2007, the station became ADA-accessible as three new elevators were put into service. A glass-enclosed rotunda adorns the front of the building.

In 2016, the block of Wyckoff Avenue in front of the station house, between Myrtle Avenue/Palmetto Street and Gates Avenue, was closed to vehicular traffic and converted to a pedestrian plaza.

== Station layout ==
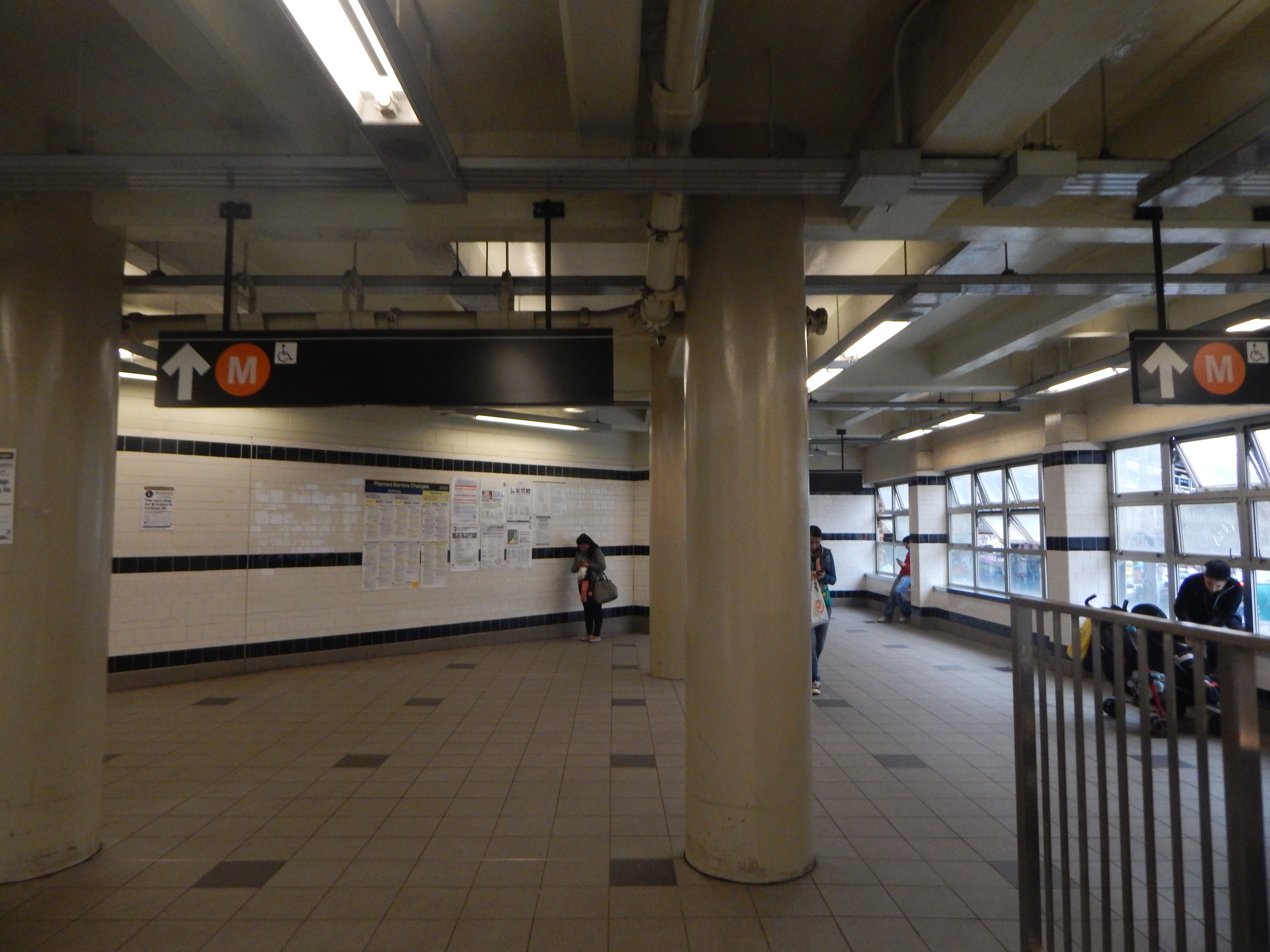
The upper mezzanine

The stations are connected via several sets of stairs, elevators, and escalators. There is an underground, lower mezzanine for the Canarsie Line, and an aboveground, upper mezzanine for the Myrtle Avenue Line. The main fare control is at street level, through the station house, though another fare control exists on the lower mezzanine for the Canarsie Line platform only. There are three elevators: one from the Canarsie Line to the lower mezzanine; one from the lower mezzanine to street level and the upper mezzanine; and one from the upper mezzanine to the Myrtle Avenue Line. There are also escalators from the lower to the upper mezzanine. The lower mezzanine is full-length, but the upper mezzanine consists of little more than a landing for the stairs, escalators, and elevators below the middle of the Myrtle Avenue Line platform.

The headhouse's ceiling is capped by a mosaic, "From Earth to Sky" by Cadence Giersbach. The artwork was completed under the MTA Arts & Design program.

=== Exits ===
The Myrtle Avenue Line's only entrance/exit is through the station house. The Canarsie Line has three additional exits: two on the northern corner of Wyckoff Avenue and Palmetto Street, and one at the southeastern corner of Myrtle and Wyckoff Avenues.

== BMT Myrtle Avenue Line platforms ==
Myrtle–Wyckoff Avenues
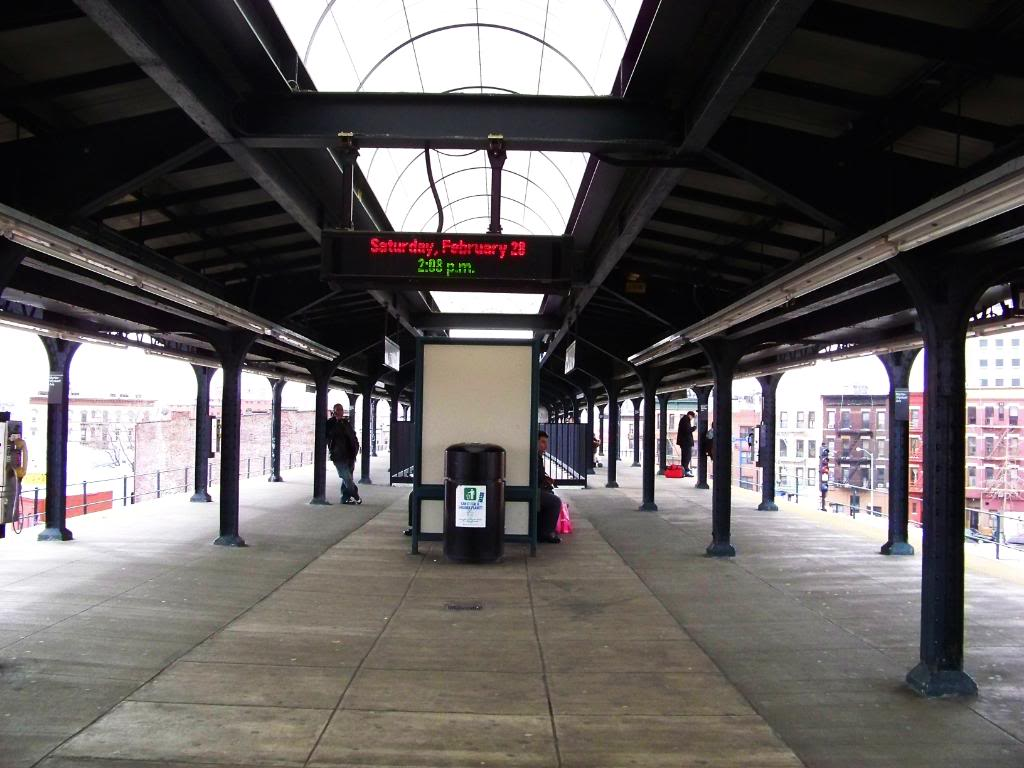
- Platform

Station statistics
- Division: B (BMT)
- Line: BMT Myrtle Avenue Line
- Services: M (all times)
- Structure: Elevated
- Platforms: 1 island platform
- Tracks: 2

Other information
- Opened: July 20, 1889; 137 years ago
- Closed: July 1, 2017; 9 years ago (temporary line closure)
- Reopened: September 1, 2017; 9 years ago
- Accessible: Yes
- Former/other names: Wyckoff Avenue
Services
Preceding station	New York City Subway	Following station
Knickerbocker Avenue toward Forest Hills–71st Avenue	M (New York City Subway service)	Seneca Avenue toward Middle Village–Metropolitan Avenue
Track layout
Station service legend
Symbol	Description
Stops all times	Stops all times
Stops late nights only	Stops late nights only
Stops all times except late nights	Stops all times except late nights

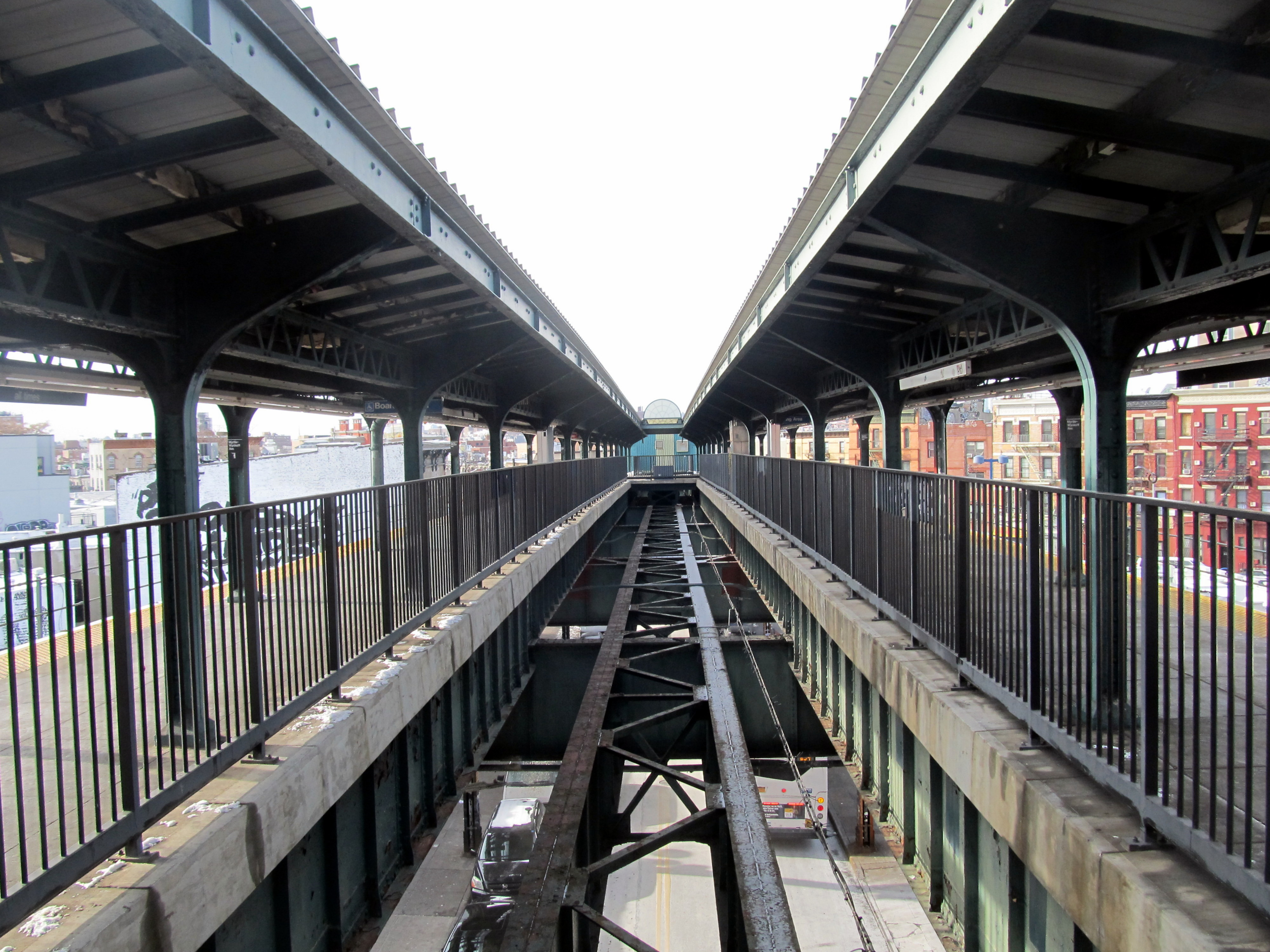
The center trackway at Wyckoff Avenue

The Myrtle–Wyckoff Avenues station on the BMT Myrtle Avenue Line (originally named Wyckoff Avenue station) is an elevated station located entirely in Brooklyn (unlike the Canarsie Line station, which is located partially in Brooklyn and partially in Queens).

The tower that existed east of this station was also built in anticipation of a junction between this line and an elevated line above Wyckoff Avenue. The tower never had an interlocking machine installed, and was used as an office instead.

== BMT Canarsie Line platform ==
Myrtle–Wyckoff Avenues
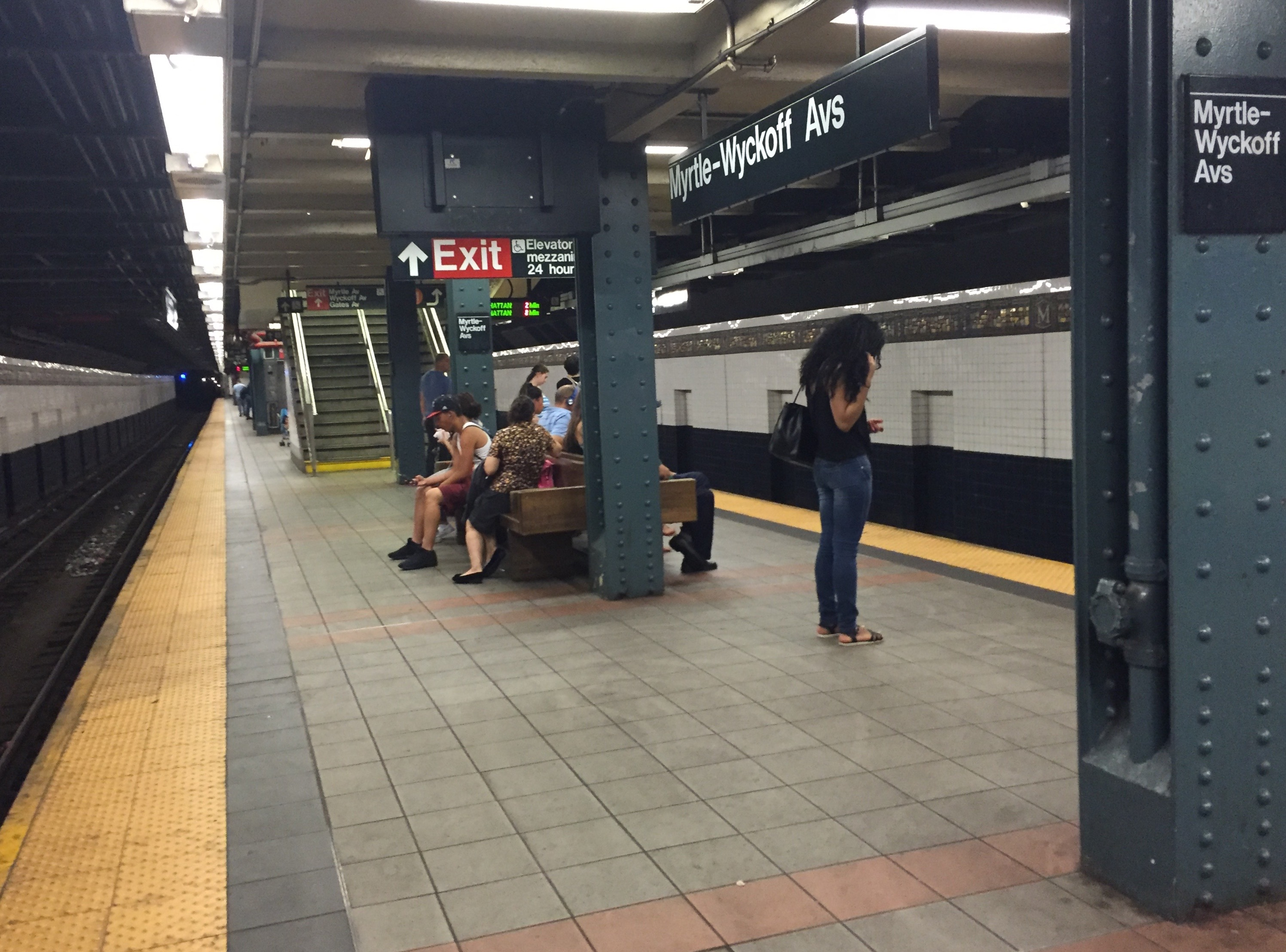
- Platform

Station statistics
- Division: B (BMT)
- Line: BMT Canarsie Line
- Services: L (all times)
- Structure: Underground
- Platforms: 1 island platform
- Tracks: 2

Other information
- Opened: July 14, 1928; 98 years ago
- Accessible: Yes
- Former/other names: Myrtle Avenue
Services
Preceding station	New York City Subway	Following station
DeKalb Avenue toward Eighth Avenue	L (New York City Subway service)	Halsey Street toward Canarsie–Rockaway Parkway
Track layout
Station service legend
Symbol	Description
Stops all times	Stops all times

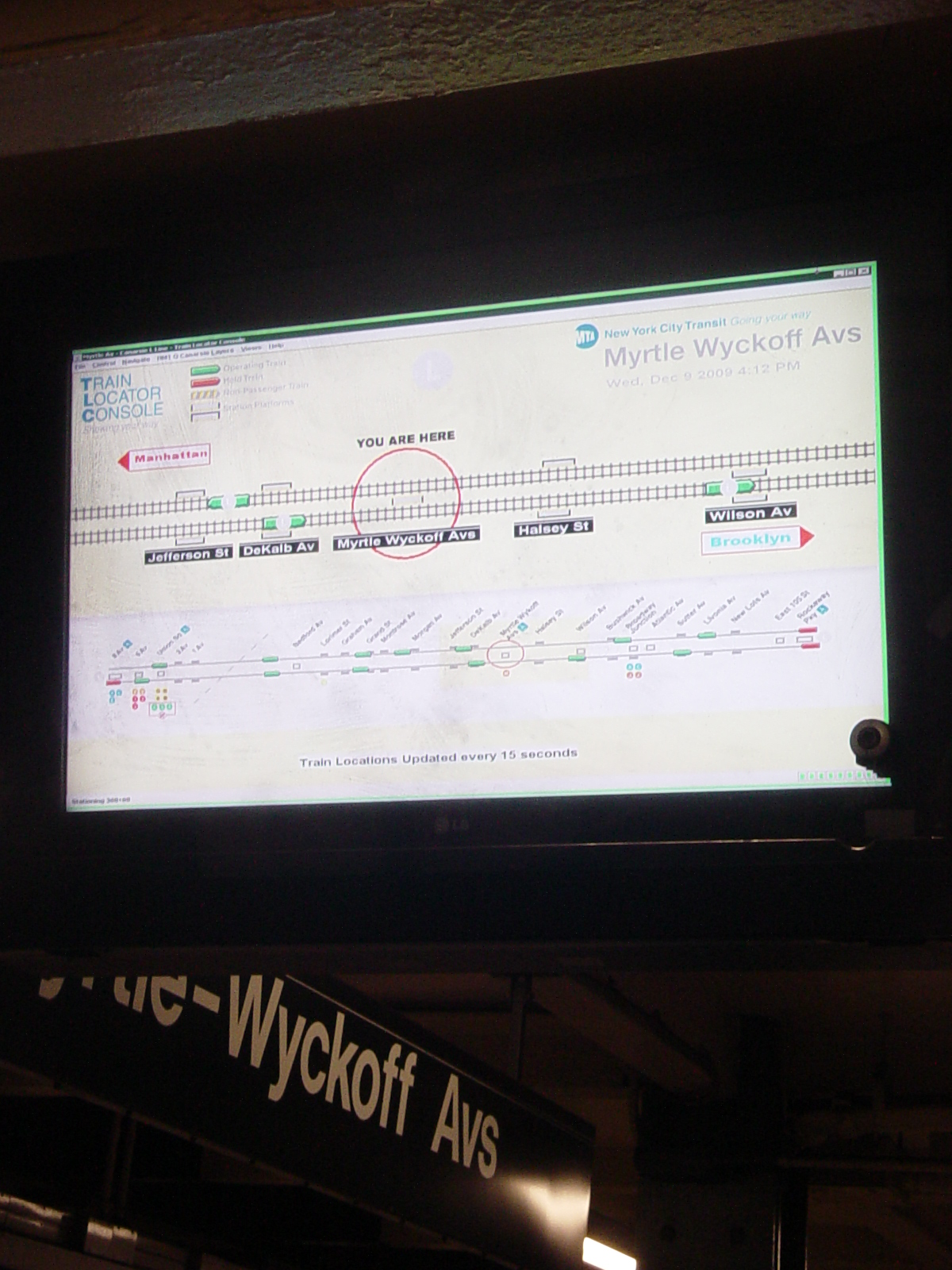
The "Train Locator Console" video screen shows where trains on the Canarsie Line are located

The Myrtle–Wyckoff Avenues station on the BMT Canarsie Line (originally named Myrtle Avenue station) is an underground station has two tracks with an island platform. Fixed platform barriers, which are intended to prevent commuters falling to the tracks, are positioned near the platform edges. A mosaic band is set at eye level, rather than high up on the wall, with brick red, yellow, tan and light blue offset by indigo and maroon. Unlike other Canarsie Line island platform stations, there are no visible girders in the walls. The ceiling is also lower than those at the other island platform stations. For most of the distance between here and Wilson Avenue, the Canarsie-bound side is located in Brooklyn, while the Manhattan-bound side is in Queens.

South of this station there is a third track for layups or storage, which is also used for trains terminating here.

== Ridgewood Intermodal Terminal ==
Adjacent to this station is the Ridgewood Intermodal Terminal, a major central bus station that opened on August 20, 2010, at a cost of $4.5 million. Located on Palmetto Street, the facility is bordered on the south by the intersection of Myrtle and Wyckoff Avenues and on the north by St. Nicholas Avenue. Palmetto Street is closed to all traffic except for NYC Transit buses and deliveries.

The terminal features reconstructed roadway and sidewalks on Palmetto Street between Wyckoff and St. Nicholas Avenues. Concrete bus pads are on the roadway along both sides of Palmetto Street for the length of the block. Sidewalk canopies suspended from the elevated structure of the Myrtle Avenue Line on both sides of Palmetto Street provide shelter from inclement weather. Other features include sidewalk benches and new lighting to improve the waiting environment for customers, new bus stop signage, bus holding lights linked to the Canarsie Line (which will be activated as part of a subsequent signal upgrade), and a new dispatcher's booth for NYC Transit employees.

The seven NYC Transit bus lines served in and around this terminal now provide easier transfers to the subway and between the bus routes.

Lane	Route	Terminus
A	Drop-off only.	
B	B52 B54	Downtown Brooklyn Cadman Plaza West via Gates Avenue; Downtown Brooklyn MetroTech Center via Myrtle Avenue
C	Drop-off only.	
D	Drop-off only.	
E	Drop-off only.	
F		
G	Q58 Q98	Flushing, Queens Main Street Station via Corona Avenue (Q58) or via Limited (Q98)

The B13, B26, and Q55 buses stop outside the terminal.
