= USS Myrtle =

USS Myrtle has been the name of more than one United States Navy ship, and may refer to:

- USS Myrtle (1862), tugboat acquired in September 1862 and sold in August 1865
- USS Myrtle (1872), wooden lighthouse tender acquired in 1917 and returned to the United States Lighthouse Service in July 1919
- USS Myrtle (SP-3289), a patrol boat in commission from 1918 to 1919
- USCGC Myrtle (WAGL-263), lighthouse and buoy tender acquired in 1939 and sold in May 1964
