= College Point Boulevard =

Road in Queens, New York

- College Point Boulevard in Flushing
- Interactive map of College Point Boulevard
- Former names: 122nd St; College Point Causeway; Lawrence Avenue
- Owner: City of New York
- Maintained by: NYCDOT
- Length: 3.76 mi (6.05 km)
- Location: Queens, New York
- Nearest subway station: 7 and <7> trains at Flushing–Main Street station
- Coordinates: 40.77664223335171°N 73.84630978767888°W
- South end: I-495 in Kew Gardens Hills
- Major junctions: I-678 in College Point; NY 25A in Flushing
- North end: 5th Avenue in College Point

College Point Boulevard is a boulevard in the New York City borough of Queens. It runs south from College Point, passing through the neighborhoods of Flushing and Queensboro Hill, before ending near Kew Garden Hills.

== History ==
College Point Boulevard developed through the consolidation of three streets: 122nd Street, College Point Causeway, and Lawrence Street. College Point Causeway had been constructed across marshland by industrialist Conrad Poppenhusen in the late 19th century, while Lawrence Street took its name from the Lawrence family, among the early settlers of the area.

By the 20th century, College Point Boulevard had become one of the main roads serving College Point. In 1938, the boulevard was widened and paved by the Works Progress Administration.

In 1969, the three streets were combined and renamed into College Point Boulevard.

In 2006, the New York City Department of Transportation conducted the College Point Transportation Study in response to concerns about traffic and transportation conditions associated with large commercial retail developments in the neighborhood. The study recommended improvements to nearby roads and intersections, including changes to connections involving College Point Boulevard and the Whitestone Expressway.

In June 2025, the New York City Department of Transportation presented proposed pedestrian safety improvements at the intersection of College Point Boulevard, Fowler Avenue, and Blossom Avenue in Flushing. The proposal included various pedestrian improvements and manage turning movements near the Queens Botanical Garden and Al Oerter Recreation Center.

== Transportation ==
College Point Boulevard is served by the following:

- The Q20 serves a section between 14th Avenue and 20th Avenue.
- The Q25 operates along College Point Boulevard between 9th Avenue and 7th Avenue on Jamaica-bound buses, and between 7th Avenue and 5th Avenue on College Point-bound buses.
- The Q26 runs between 14th Avenue and Northern Boulevard.
- The Q58 and Q98 buses run on the boulevard between the Horace Harding Expressway and 41st Road on Flushing-bound buses, and between Sanford Avenue and the Horace Harding Expressway on Ridgewood-bound buses.
