= Q37 (New York City bus) =

Bus route in Queens, New York

q37, q37b
- 111th Street
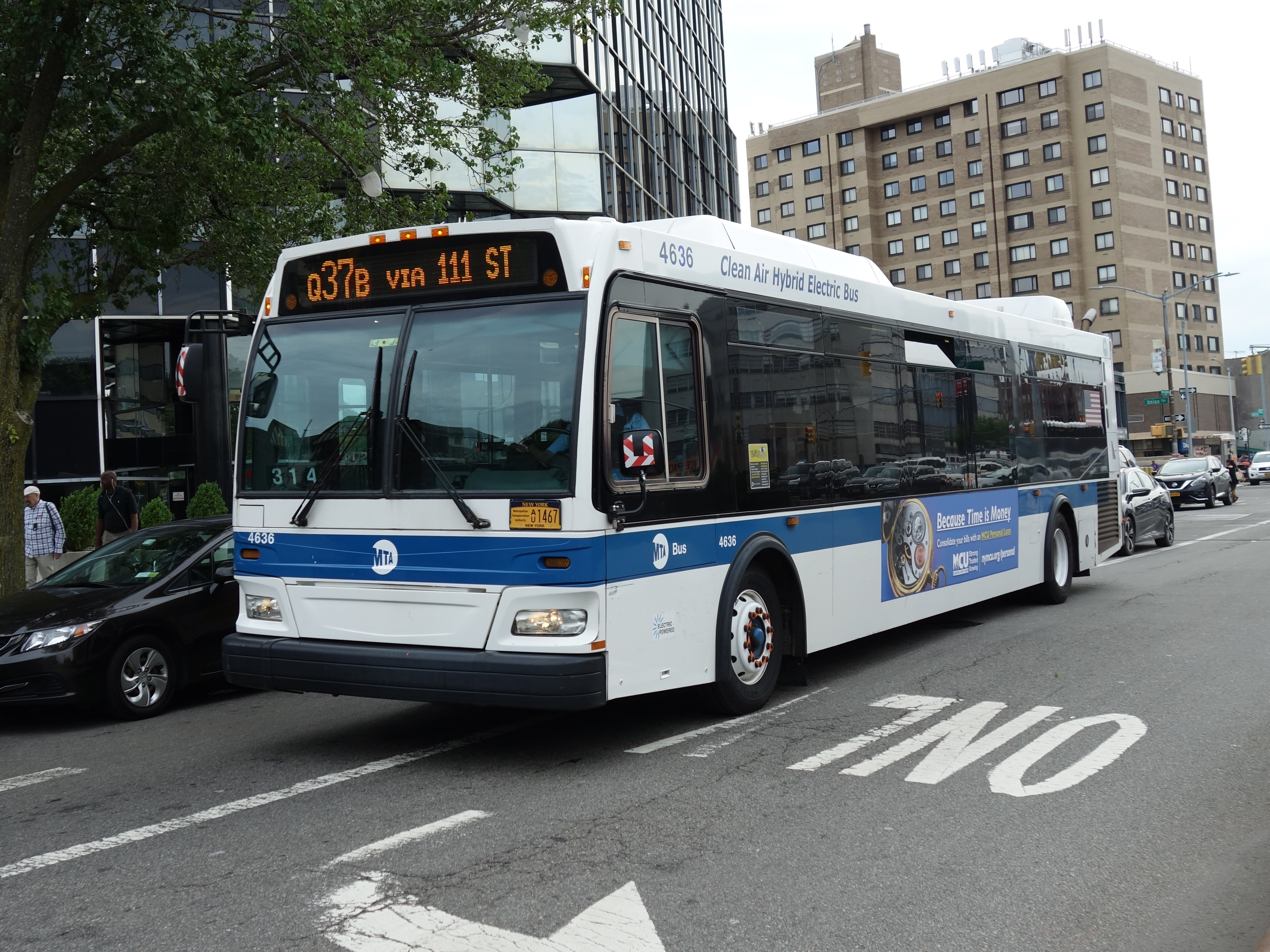
- A 2010 Orion VII NG HEV (4636) on the Q37B leaving Kew Gardens-Union Tpke in June 2018

Overview
- System: MTA Regional Bus Operations
- Operator: MTA Bus Company
- Garage: JFK Depot
- Vehicle: Nova Bus LFS; New Flyer Xcelsior XD40
- Began service: 1939

Route
- Locale: Queens, New York, U.S.
- Communities served: Kew Gardens, Richmond Hill, South Richmond Hill, South Ozone Park
- Landmarks served: Queens Borough Hall, Aqueduct Racetrack (except Q37B)
- Start: Kew Gardens – Union Turnpike station
- Via: Park Lane South, 111th Street, 135th Avenue
- End: South Ozone Park – 131st Street and 135th Road
- Length: 5.6 miles (9.0 km)
- Other routes: Q10/Q80 Lefferts Boulevard/JFK Airport

Service
- Operates: All times except late nights
- Annual patronage: 1,562,910 (2025)
- Transfers: Yes
- Timetable: Q37

The Q37 bus route constitutes a public transit line in Queens, New York City, running primarily along 111th Street between Kew Gardens and South Ozone Park. The Q37 was formerly privately operated by Green Bus Lines, under a subsidized franchise with the New York City Department of Transportation (NYCDOT). The route is now operated by MTA Regional Bus Operations under the MTA Bus Company brand.

Most Q37 buses serve the Resorts World Casino in South Ozone Park. All buses that bypass the casino are designated Q37B. This route was originally operated by General Omnibus Company, which began service on this route in January 1934. In 1936, the route was awarded to Green Bus Lines, and in 2006, the MTA Bus Company took over the operations of the Green Bus Lines routes.

== Route description and service ==
The Q37 bus originates at Queens Boulevard and Union Turnpike, where a vast majority of the riders of the Q37 transfer to the New York City Subway at the Kew Gardens–Union Turnpike subway station. The bus turns via Kew Gardens Road, and then turns south via 80th Road, and then buses turn onto Park Lane. Buses at this point going northbound continue via Park Lane and then turn on Union Turnpike. After running via Park Lane, the Q37 turns onto Park Lane South, which is on the border of Kew Gardens and Forest Park. Then the bus turns east on Myrtle Avenue, and then it turns southeast via 111th Street, and it continues to run via 111th Street until Rockaway Boulevard, passing through Richmond Hill and Ozone Park. The bus route then turns into Aqueduct Race Track to serve the Resorts World Casino in South Ozone Park. Afterwards, the route continues onto Rockaway Boulevard before turning southeast via various local streets. The bus then turns east via 135th Avenue, and then onto South Conduit Avenue before reaching the route's terminal at 149th Avenue and 150th Avenue in South Ozone Park.

The Resorts World Casino is not served by alternate rush-hour buses on weekdays or any bus until 7am southbound and 9am northbound every day. All buses that bypass the casino are labeled Q37B.

=== School trippers ===
When school is in session, three buses depart from Rockaway Boulevard/98th Street near M.S. 137 America’s School of Heroes at 2:30pm. All trips bypass the casino and operate to Kew Gardens, heading to 111th Street via Rockaway Boulevard.

== History ==
=== Early operation ===
This route was originally operated by General Omnibus Company, which was incorporated on October 13, 1933. Service on this route began in January 1934.

In 1936, Queens was divided into four zones for bus operating franchise purposes. With the new zone setup, one company would be awarded the franchise in each zone, with any remaining smaller operations acquired by the larger company. The Q37 fell into Zone C, the zone for Ozone Park, Woodhaven, Richmond Hill, and the Rockaways, and the route was awarded to Green Bus Lines.

On May 19, 1938, the New York State Transit Commission approved a modification in the Q37's route, creating a terminal loop at its Jamaica Avenue terminus instead of having the route make a U-turn on 111th Street.

On April 15, 1941, the president and treasurer of Green Bus Lines applied for a franchise to extend the Q37 from the south side of Jamaica Avenue north to Queens Boulevard in Kew Gardens, providing a connection to the Queens Boulevard subway line. Their franchise application called for an extension of the route along 111th Street to Myrtle Avenue, and then along Park Lane South, Park Lane and Union Turnpike to the subway, with buses continuing along Kew Gardens and 80th Road to head back into service in the other direction. It was expected that, at the earliest, the franchise would be awarded in September. The Board of Estimate approved the extension on June 26.

On November 18, 1941, a certificate of convenience and necessity for the extension was granted. The extension was inaugurated five days later. Prior to the extension, Q37 riders who needed to travel to the subway had to pay an additional nickel fare to transfer to another bus. The extension had been sought out by the Richmond Hill Civic Association and the Richmond Hill Board of Trade.

=== MTA takeover ===
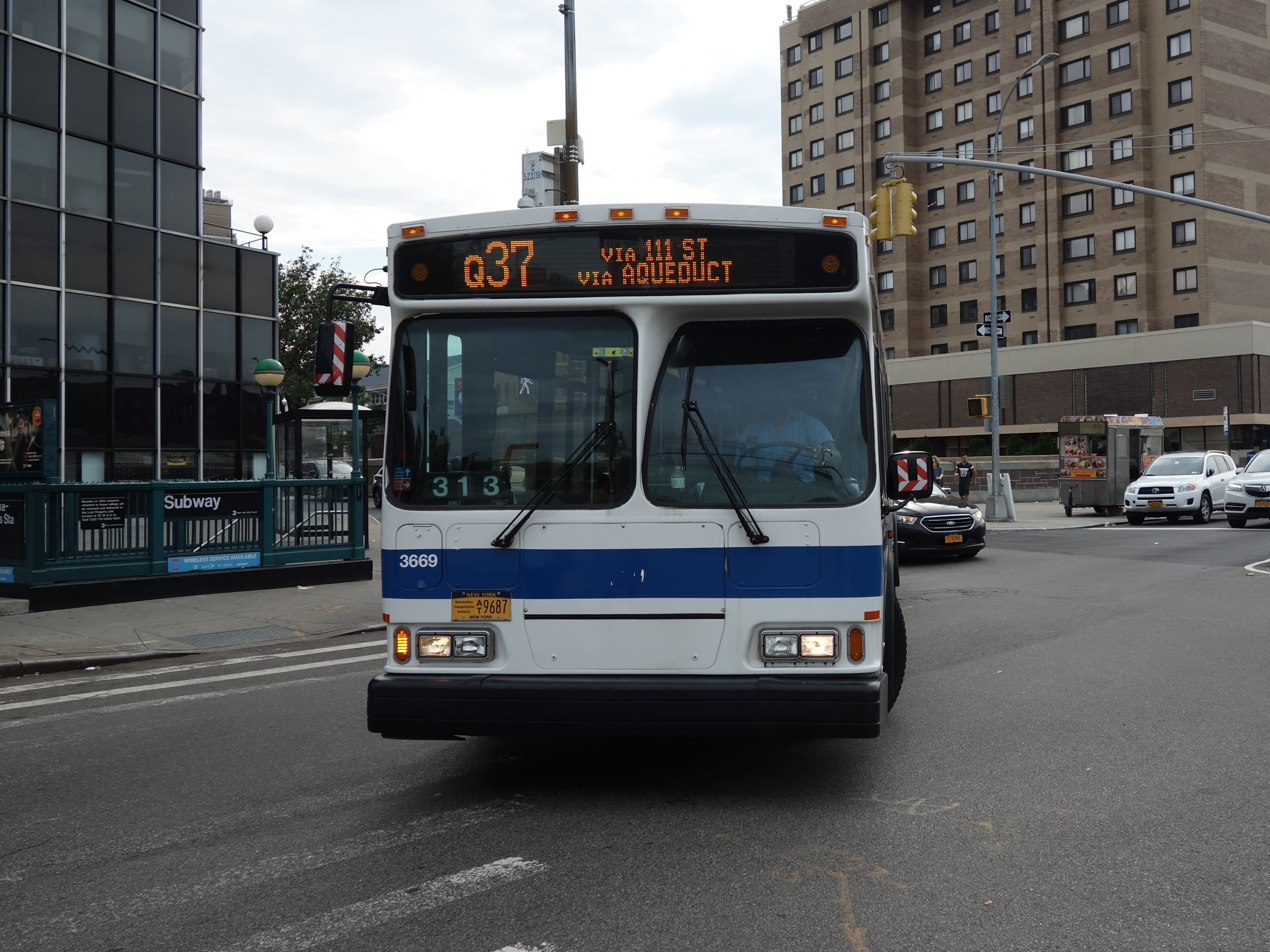
A 2007 Orion VII OG HEV (3669) on the South Ozone Park-bound Aqueduct Q37 leaving Kew Gardens-Union Tpke in June 2018

On January 9, 2006, the MTA Bus Company took over the operations of the Green Bus Lines routes.

On October 30, 2011, daily service via Aqueduct Racetrack was added, to serve the Resorts World Casino. Also on this date, the Q37 was rerouted to operate on 133rd Avenue, Lefferts Boulevard and 135th Avenue, in both directions. Service on 116th Street was discontinued.

To provide more reliable service, the Q37's terminal loop was changed on February 24, 2013, with southbound buses heading toward the terminal at 150th Avenue and 149th Avenue traveling along South Conduit Avenue between 130th Street and 134th Street instead of along 150th Avenue. The southbound stop at 150th Avenue and 130th Street was moved one block to the north at South Conduit Avenue. The route was changed in order to avoid congestion at the sanitation yard on 150th Avenue. An additional reason for the change was to allow buses to avoid making a turn onto South Conduit Avenue from 132nd Street, because there is no traffic light at this intersection and vehicles often pass at high speeds, often causing severe delays. Additionally, 132nd Street is a narrow residential block.

On September 3, 2017, due to low ridership at Resorts World Casino, alternate weekday rush hour trips started bypassing the casino and were labeled Q37B. In July 2018, the MTA indicated that it would truncate the southern terminus of the Q37 bus to 131st Street and 135th Road. This was partially because of congestion on 130th Street that is caused by traffic from PS/MS 124 and a New York City Department of Sanitation facility; and partially because of low ridership along that part of the route, which sees about 300 riders on an average weekday. The Q10 continued to provide alternate service in the area.

=== Bus redesign ===
In December 2019, the MTA released a draft redesign of the Queens bus network. As part of the redesign, the Q37 would have been replaced by a "neighborhood" route called the QT37, which would be straightened in South Ozone Park, using to use Rockaway Boulevard, Lefferts Boulevard, and 135th Avenue. The redesign was delayed due to the COVID-19 pandemic in New York City in 2020, and the original draft plan was dropped due to negative feedback.

A revised plan was released in March 2022. The planned modifications of the Q37 in the new plan are similar to those proposed in the 2019 plan.

A final bus-redesign plan was released in December 2023. The Q37 would be extended to the AirTrain JFK's Lefferts Boulevard station, traveling via 130th Street, 134th Street, and Pan Am Road. The route would be straightened along Rockaway and Lefferts Boulevards in South Ozone Park, and it would also start running 24/7.

On December 17, 2024, addendums to the final plan were released. Among these, bus stops on the Q37 were rearranged, and the South Ozone Park terminal and current service patterns were retained. On January 29, 2025, the current plan was approved by the MTA Board, and the Queens Bus Redesign went into effect in two different phases during Summer 2025. The Q37 is part of Phase II, which began on August 31, 2025.

== Connecting bus routes ==
- Q45, Q46, Q48, Q60, QM63, QM64, QM65, QM68 (at Queens Boulevard)
- Q54 (at Metropolitan Avenue)
- Q55 (at Myrtle Avenue)
- Q56 (at Jamaica Avenue)
- Q24 (at Atlantic Avenue)
- Q8 (at 101st Avenue)
- Q112 (at Liberty Avenue)
- Q41 (at 109th Avenue)
- Q7, Q51 (at Rockaway Boulevard)
- Q10, Q80, QM18 (at Lefferts Boulevard)

== See also ==
- Green Bus Lines
