= Mussel Creek (Curry County, Oregon) =

Coordinates: 42.615387°N 124.399270°W

Mussel Creek is a small stream, about 4 miles (6 km) long, in Curry County in the U.S. state of Oregon. It arises in the Siskiyou Mountains and flows generally west to its confluence with Myrtle Creek in the Arizona Beach State Recreation Site. The creeks flow under U.S. Highway 101 and through the park, where they merge and enter the Pacific Ocean about 10 miles (16 km) south of Port Orford.

== See also ==
- List of rivers of Oregon
