= Arizona Beach State Recreation Site =

Oregon state park in Curry County

- Location within Oregon
- Interactive map of Arizona Beach State Recreation Site
- Location: Curry County, Oregon, United States
- Coordinates: 42°36′54″N 124°23′59″W
- Area: 68 acres (28 ha)
- Elevation: 7 ft (2.1 m)
- Established: 2008
- Operator: Oregon Parks and Recreation Department
- Website: Arizona Beach State Recreation Site

Arizona Beach State Recreation Site is a 68-acre (28 ha) Oregon state park in Curry County, Oregon, in the United States. The beach is at an average elevation of 7 feet (2 m). Public recreational facilities at Arizona Beach State Recreation Site include a parking lot for beach access, observation areas for viewing marine mammals and birds and tables for picnicking. The park is open year-round.

Arizona Beach was in private hands until 2008 and was the site of a campground. Since it was acquired by the state at a cost of $3 million in 2008, the campground was torn down as it did not meet state requirements. The beach is on the Pacific Ocean and gets its name from the warm temperatures that are unusual for the Oregon coast. The area surrounding Arizona Beach is rugged. There are few places along the coast where the Pacific can be accessed from a sandy beach. Headlands shelter the park and keep the cool Northwest Pacific winds away and creating temperatures that are higher than what is normal in the rest of the area. Two creeks, Mussel and Myrtle, flow through the park and into the ocean.

Arizona Beach State Recreation Site is home to a variety of wildlife including elk, peregrine falcons, brown pelicans, pigeon guillemots and pelagic cormorants. The offshore rocks at the park are part of the Oregon Islands National Wildlife Refuge. Thirteen species of seabirds make their nests on the rocks of the refuge. The birds found on the rocks are pigeon guillemots, tufted puffins, common murres, rhinoceros auklets, Brandt's, pelagic, and double-crested cormorants, Leach's and fork-tailed storm petrels. The rocks also provide a habitat for harbor and northern elephant seals and California and Steller sea lions. Public access to the rocks is not permitted.
