= Knickerbocker Avenue station =

New York City Subway station in Brooklyn

Knickerbocker Avenue
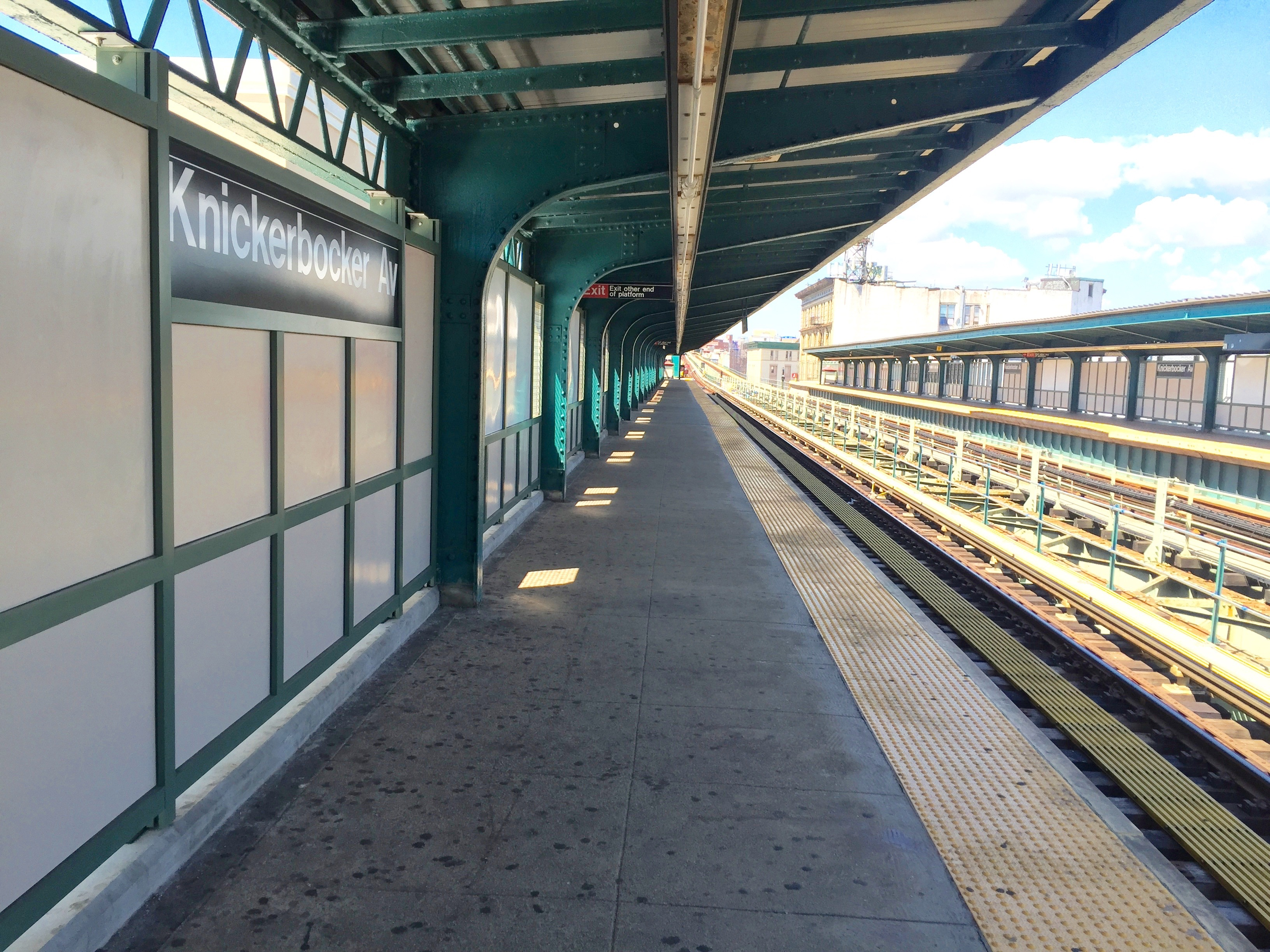
- Metropolitan Avenue bound platform

Station statistics
- Address: Knickerbocker Avenue & Myrtle Avenue; Brooklyn, New York
- Borough: Brooklyn
- Locale: Bushwick
- Coordinates: 40.698731°N 73.918376°W
- Division: B (BMT)
- Line: BMT Myrtle Avenue Line
- Services: M (all times)
- Transit: NYCT Bus: B54, B60
- Structure: Elevated
- Platforms: 2 side platforms
- Tracks: 2

Other information
- Opened: August 15, 1889; 137 years ago
- Closed: August 17, 2012; 14 years ago (reconstruction); July 1, 2017; 9 years ago (temporary line closure)
- Rebuilt: February 8, 2013; 13 years ago (reconstruction); April 30, 2018; 8 years ago (temporary line closure)

Traffic
- 2025: 1,002,096 ▲9.5%
- Rank: 311 out of 423
Services
Preceding station	New York City Subway	Following station
Central Avenue toward Forest Hills–71st Avenue	M (New York City Subway service)	Myrtle–Wyckoff Avenues toward Middle Village–Metropolitan Avenue
Non-revenue services and lines
Preceding station	New York City Subway	Following station
Evergreen Avenue demolished	no service	
Location
Location within New York City Subway
Location within New York City
Location within New York
Track layout
Street map
Station service legend
Symbol	Description
Stops all times	Stops all times

The Knickerbocker Avenue station is a station on the BMT Myrtle Avenue Line of the New York City Subway. Located at the intersection of Myrtle and Knickerbocker Avenues in Bushwick, Brooklyn, it is served by the M train at all times.

== History ==
The Myrtle Avenue Line was built and operated by the Union Elevated Railroad Company. The first section of the line opened in 1888, and it was extended from Broadway to Wyckoff Avenue on July 20, 1889. However, Knickerbocker Avenue station, which was along this extension, did not open until August 15, 1889.

The station was rehabilitated from August 17, 2012, to February 8, 2013. On July 1, 2017, the station was closed again until April 30, 2018 as part of the reconstruction of the Myrtle Avenue Line's connection with the BMT Jamaica Line.

== Station layout ==
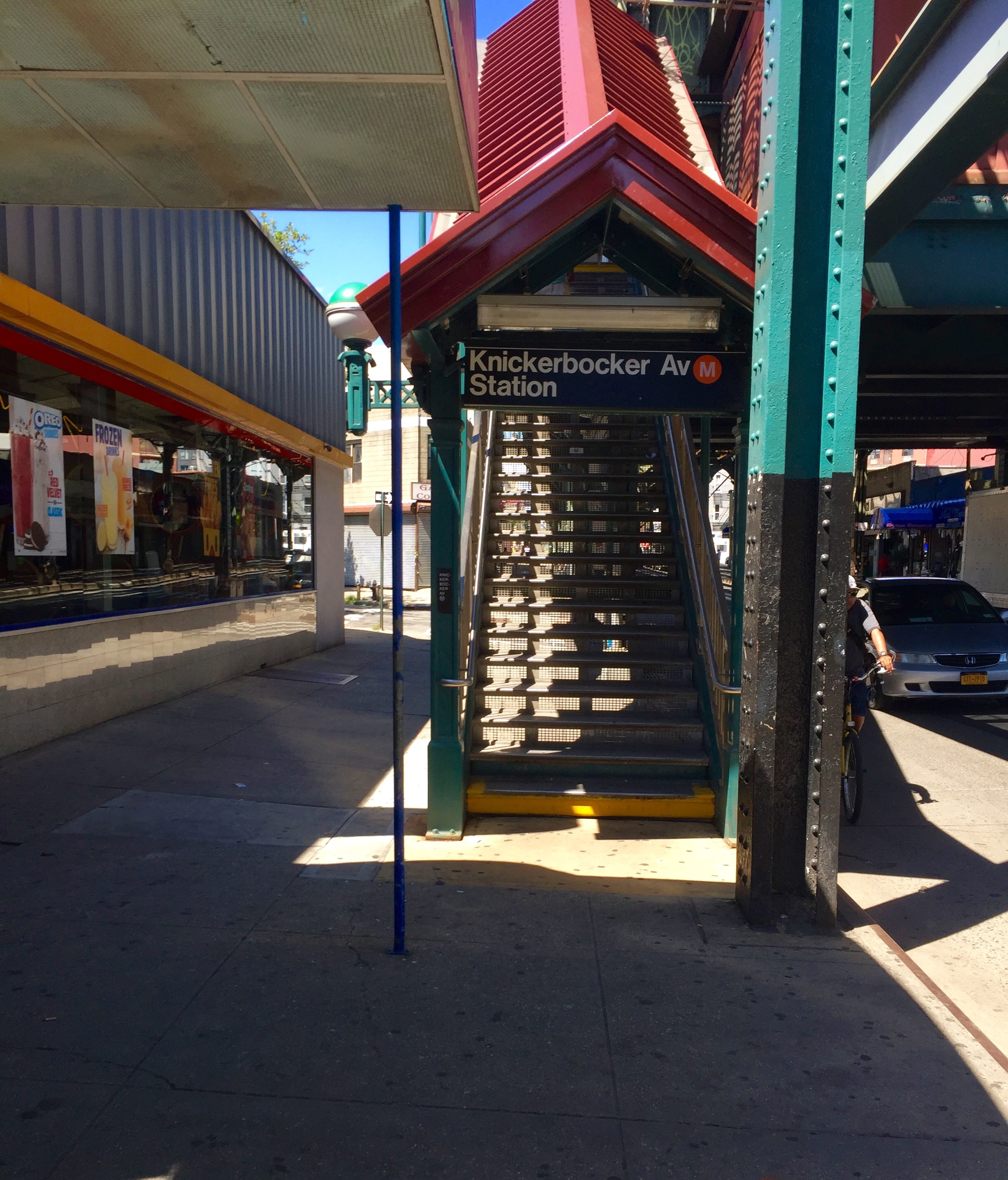
SW corner entrance

This elevated station has two side platforms and two tracks with space for a third track, which was removed by 1946. Both platforms have steel canopies along their entire lengths except for small sections at their extreme ends. The western half of both platforms has grey windscreens while the eastern half has waist-high steel fences. The station names are in the standard black plates with white lettering.

This station has one elevated station house beneath the platforms and tracks. One staircase from the eastern end of each platform goes down to a waiting area/crossover. A turnstile bank provides entrance/exit from the system. Outside fare control, there is a token booth and two staircases going down to either side of Myrtle Avenue between Knickerbocker and Greene Avenues. The station formerly had another station house at the south end.
