= Central Avenue station (BMT Myrtle Avenue Line) =

New York City Subway station in Brooklyn

Central Avenue
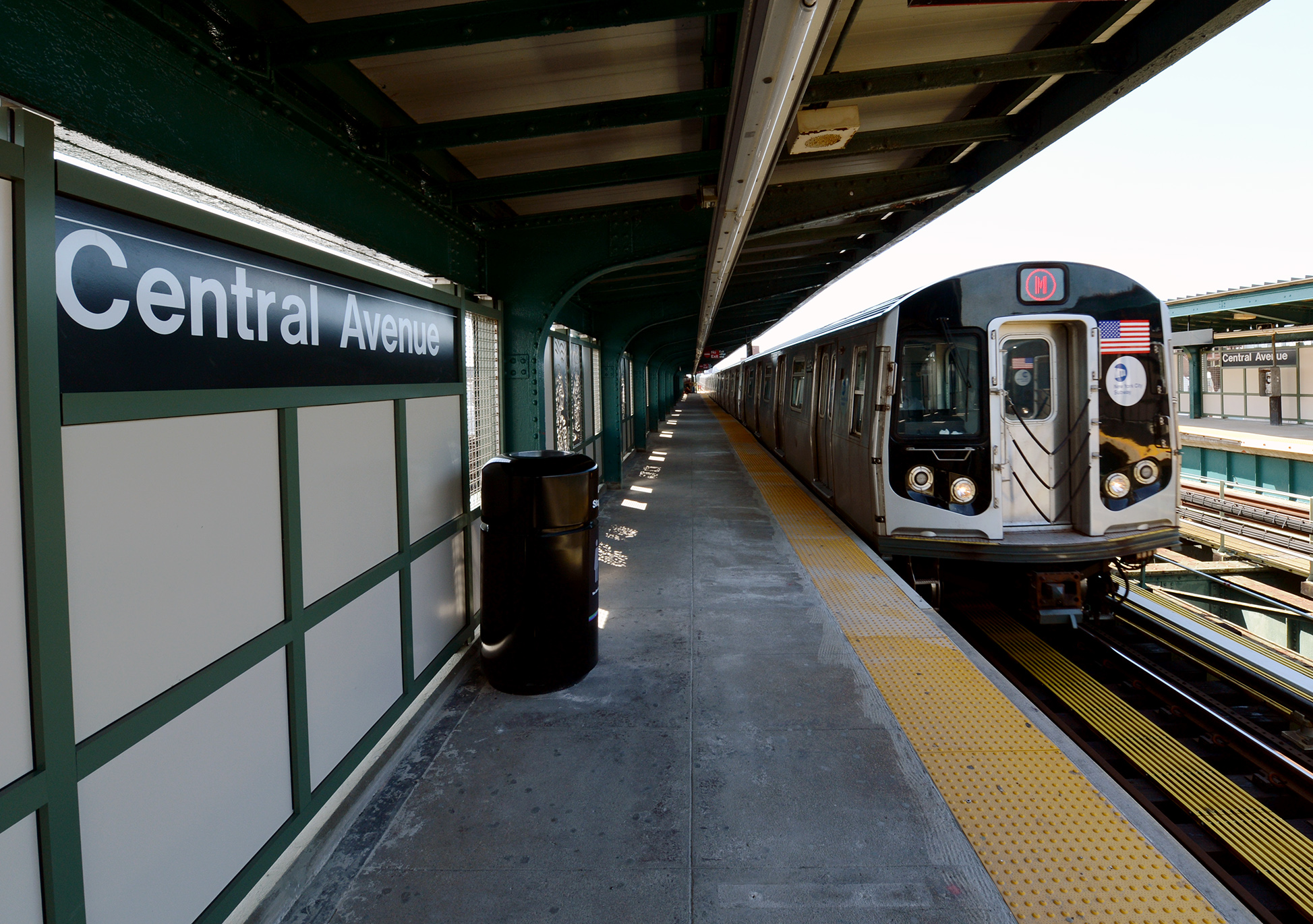
- R160 M train arriving at the Metropolitan Avenue-bound platform

Station statistics
- Address: Cedar Street & Myrtle Avenue; Brooklyn, New York
- Borough: Brooklyn
- Locale: Bushwick
- Coordinates: 40.698015°N 73.9252°W
- Division: B (BMT)
- Line: BMT Myrtle Avenue Line
- Services: M (all times)
- Transit: NYCT Bus: B38, B54
- Structure: Elevated
- Platforms: 2 side platforms
- Tracks: 2

Other information
- Opened: July 20, 1889; 137 years ago
- Closed: March 9, 2013; 13 years ago (first closing); July 1, 2017; 9 years ago (temporary line closure)
- Rebuilt: August 2, 2013; 13 years ago (reconstruction); April 30, 2018; 8 years ago (temporary line closure)

Traffic
- 2025: 913,228 ▲3.3%
- Rank: 329 out of 423
Services
Preceding station	New York City Subway	Following station
Myrtle Avenue toward Forest Hills–71st Avenue	M (New York City Subway service)	Knickerbocker Avenue toward Middle Village–Metropolitan Avenue
Non-revenue services and lines
Preceding station	New York City Subway	Following station
Evergreen Avenue Myrtle; demolished	no service	
Location
Location within New York City Subway
Location within New York City
Location within New York
Track layout
Street map
Station service legend
Symbol	Description
Stops all times	Stops all times

The Central Avenue station is a station on the BMT Myrtle Avenue Line of the New York City Subway. Located at Myrtle Avenue and Cedar Street in Bushwick, Brooklyn, it is served by the M train at all times.

== History ==
The Myrtle Avenue Line was built and operated by the Union Elevated Railroad Company. The first section of the line opened in 1888, and it was extended from Broadway to Wyckoff Avenue on July 20, 1889.

This station was rehabilitated from March to August 2013. On July 1, 2017, the station was closed again until April 30, 2018, as part of the reconstruction of the Myrtle Avenue Line's junction with the BMT Jamaica Line.

== Station layout ==
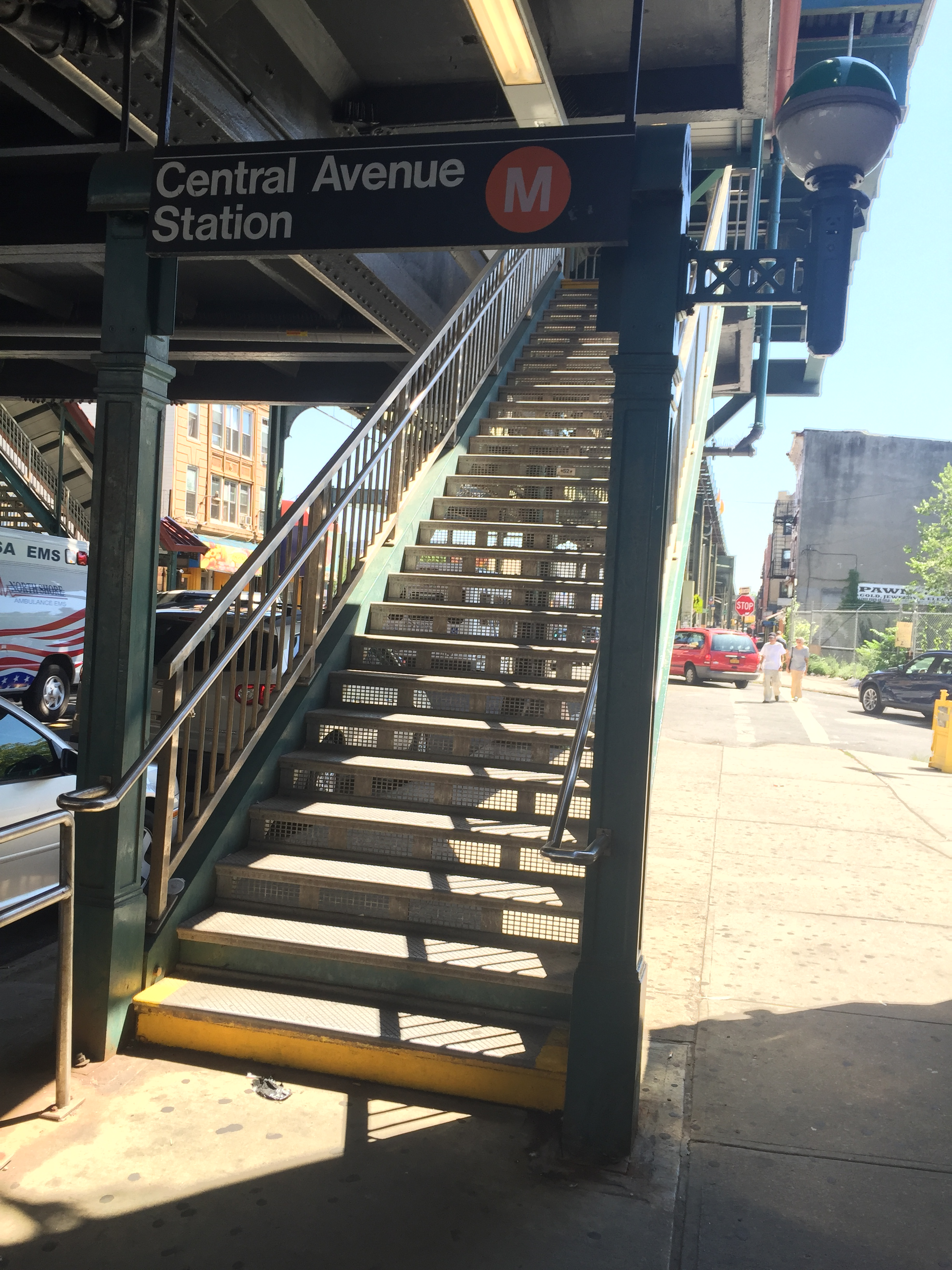
Station entrance

This elevated station has two side platforms and two tracks with space for a center track, which was removed by 1946.

The Queens-bound platform has brown canopies with green frames and support columns for the entire length except for small sections at either ends. A small section in the center below the canopy has beige windscreens while the rest of the platform has black, waist-high, steel fences. The Manhattan-bound platform has the same layout as the Queens-bound one except that the entire canopied portion has beige windscreens.

=== Exits ===
This station has one elevated station house beneath the platforms and tracks at the east end, though extra beams on the elevated structure suggests that another station house formerly existed at the west end. A single staircase from each platform goes down to a waiting area/crossunder, where a turnstile bank provides access to and from the station. Outside fare control, there is a token booth and two staircases going down to the southwest and northwest corners of Myrtle Avenue and Cedar Street. Only the northern staircase has a canopy above it.
