= Myrtle Creek =

Myrtle Creek may refer to:

- Myrtle Creek, New South Wales, Australia, a locality
- Tahmoor, New South Wales, a town that was originally called Myrtle Creek
- Myrtle Creek (Victoria), Australia, a stream
- Myrtle Creek, Oregon, United States, a city
- Myrtle Creek (Curry County, Oregon), a stream
- Myrtle Creek (South Umpqua River tributary), a stream in Oregon
