= Myrtle Bank =

Myrtle Bank may refer to:

in Australia

- Myrtle Bank, South Australia
- Myrtle Bank, Tasmania

in the United Kingdom

- Myrtle Bank, Little Switzerland, Douglas, Isle of Man, one of Isle of Man's Registered Buildings

in the United States

- Myrtle Bank (Natchez, Mississippi), listed on the NRHP in Mississippi
