= USS Myrtle (1862) =

Tugboat of the United States Navy

History

United States
- Ordered: as Resolute
- Laid down: date unknown
- Launched: date unknown
- Acquired: 30 September 1862
- Commissioned: October 1862
- Decommissioned: August 1865
- Stricken: 1865 (est.)
- Homeport: Cairo, Illinois; Mound City, Illinois
- Fate: Sold, 17 August 1865

General characteristics
- Displacement: 60 tons
- Length: 75 ft (23 m)
- Beam: 16 ft 3 in (4.95 m)
- Draft: 6 ft (1.8 m)
- Propulsion: steam engine; twin screw-propelled
- Speed: 10 knots
- Complement: not known
- Armament: not known

The first USS Myrtle was a steamer purchased by the Union Navy during the American Civil War. It was used as a tugboat and as a dispatch boat assigned to assist Union Navy ships patrolling Confederate waterways.

== Assigned to the Mississippi Squadron ==
Myrtle, a twin screw tug, was acquired as Resolute by the Navy from the U.S. War Department on 30 September 1862, renamed Myrtle on 15 October 1862, and assigned to Rear Admiral David Dixon Porter’s Mississippi Squadron.

During the remainder of the Civil War, the ship operated at Cairo, Illinois, providing tug and towing services for the squadron and as a dispatch boat. It served on both the Mississippi and Ohio Rivers. In 1865, its base of operations was moved to Mound City, Illinois.

The ship was turned over to the naval station at Mound City on 8 August 1865, and was sold at public auction on 17 August 1865 to E. H. Ellis.

== See also ==
- Anaconda Plan
