= Myrtle Township =

Myrtle Township may refer to:

- Myrtle Township, Knox County, Missouri
- Myrtle Township, Oregon County, Missouri
- Myrtle Township, Custer County, Nebraska
