= Q55 (New York City bus) =

Bus route in Queens, New York

q55
- Richmond Hill Line; Myrtle Avenue (East) line
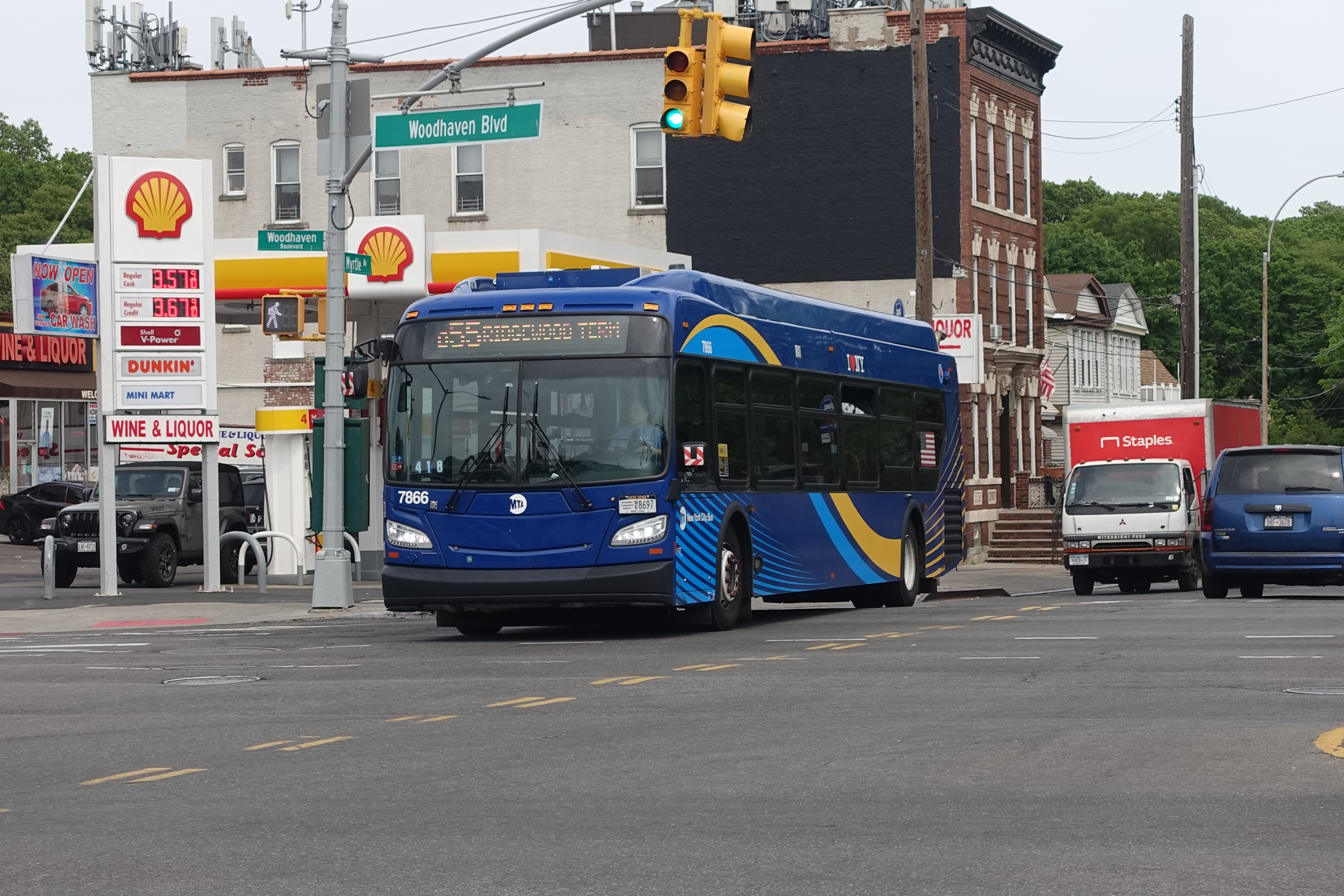
- A 2022 XD40 (7866) on the Ridgewood-bound Q55 in Glendale, Queens, at Woodhaven Boulevard and Myrtle Avenue in May 2023

Overview
- System: MTA Regional Bus Operations
- Operator: New York City Transit Authority
- Garage: Fresh Pond Depot
- Vehicle: New Flyer Xcelsior XD40
- Ended service: April 26, 1950 (Trolley)

Route
- Locale: Queens, New York, U.S.
- Communities served: Ridgewood, Glendale, Richmond Hill
- Start: Ridgewood Intermodal Terminal
- Via: Myrtle Avenue
- End: Richmond Hill, Queens – Myrtle Avenue and Jamaica Avenue
- Length: 4.2 miles (6.8 km)
- Other routes: B54 (Myrtle Avenue West)

Service
- Operates: 24 hours
- Annual patronage: 1,681,755 (2025)
- Transfers: Yes
- Timetable: Q55

The Richmond Hill Line is a surface transit line on Myrtle Avenue in Queens, New York City. Once a streetcar line owned by the Brooklyn–Manhattan Transit Corporation, it was replaced on April 26, 1950 by the B55 bus route. The trolley tracks were not removed until April 1955, when Myrtle Avenue was being repaved. On December 11, 1988, the bus was relabeled as the Q55 Myrtle Avenue (East) bus route (as opposed to the B54 route on the western portion of Myrtle Avenue), operated by the New York City Transit Authority.

== Current route ==
The current Q55 route is identical to the route it used when it opened in 1950. The Q55 begins at the Ridgewood Intermodal Terminal at the Myrtle–Wyckoff Avenues subway station on the Brooklyn-Queens border. It then runs via Myrtle Avenue, cutting through Forest Park, and continuing to Jamaica Avenue and 117th Street in Richmond Hill, a few blocks west of the 121st Street subway station. Ridgewood-bound buses begin their trips at Myrtle Avenue and Hillside Avenue. Some Jamaica Avenue-bound buses may short-turn at Woodhaven Boulevard.

=== School trippers ===
When school is in session, one bus to Ridgewood originates at 74th Street at 2:30pm. This trip serves as an accommodation for students at nearby P.S./I.S. 119 The Glendale.

== History ==
=== Bus redesigns ===
In December 2019, the MTA released a draft redesign of the Queens bus network. As part of the redesign, the Q55 would have been replaced by a "neighborhood" route called the QT55, which would have been extended to Jamaica using Jamaica Avenue. The redesign was delayed due to the COVID-19 pandemic in New York City in 2020, and the original draft plan was dropped due to negative feedback.

A revised plan was released in March 2022. The planned changes to the Q55 were similar to those proposed in the 2019 plan.

A final bus-redesign plan was released in December 2023. The Q55 was to be extended slightly eastward to the 121st Street station.

On December 17, 2024, addendums to the final plan were released. Among these, stop changes were made on the Q55, including a revised turnaround in Ridgewood. Because of circumstances facing service to the 121st Street station, the Jamaica Avenue terminal was retained. On January 29, 2025, the current plan was approved by the MTA Board, and the Queens Bus Redesign went into effect in two different phases during Summer 2025. The Q55 is part of Phase I, which started on June 29, 2025.

== Connecting bus routes ==
- B13, B26, B52, B54, Q58, Q98 (at Ridgewood Terminal)
- B38 (at Seneca Avenue)
- Q39 (at Forest Avenue)
- B13, B20, QM24, QM25, QM34 (at Fresh Pond Road)
- Q29 (at 80th Street)
- Q11, Q52 SBS, Q53 SBS, QM15, BM5 (at Woodhaven Boulevard)
- Q37 (at 111th Street)
- Q10, Q56, Q80 (at Jamaica Avenue/117th Street, Q10 and Q80 one block east at Lefferts Boulevard)
