= Q58 and Q98 buses =

Bus routes in Queens, New York

q58 q98 ltd
- Flushing–Ridgewood Line; Corona Avenue Line; Fresh Pond Road Line
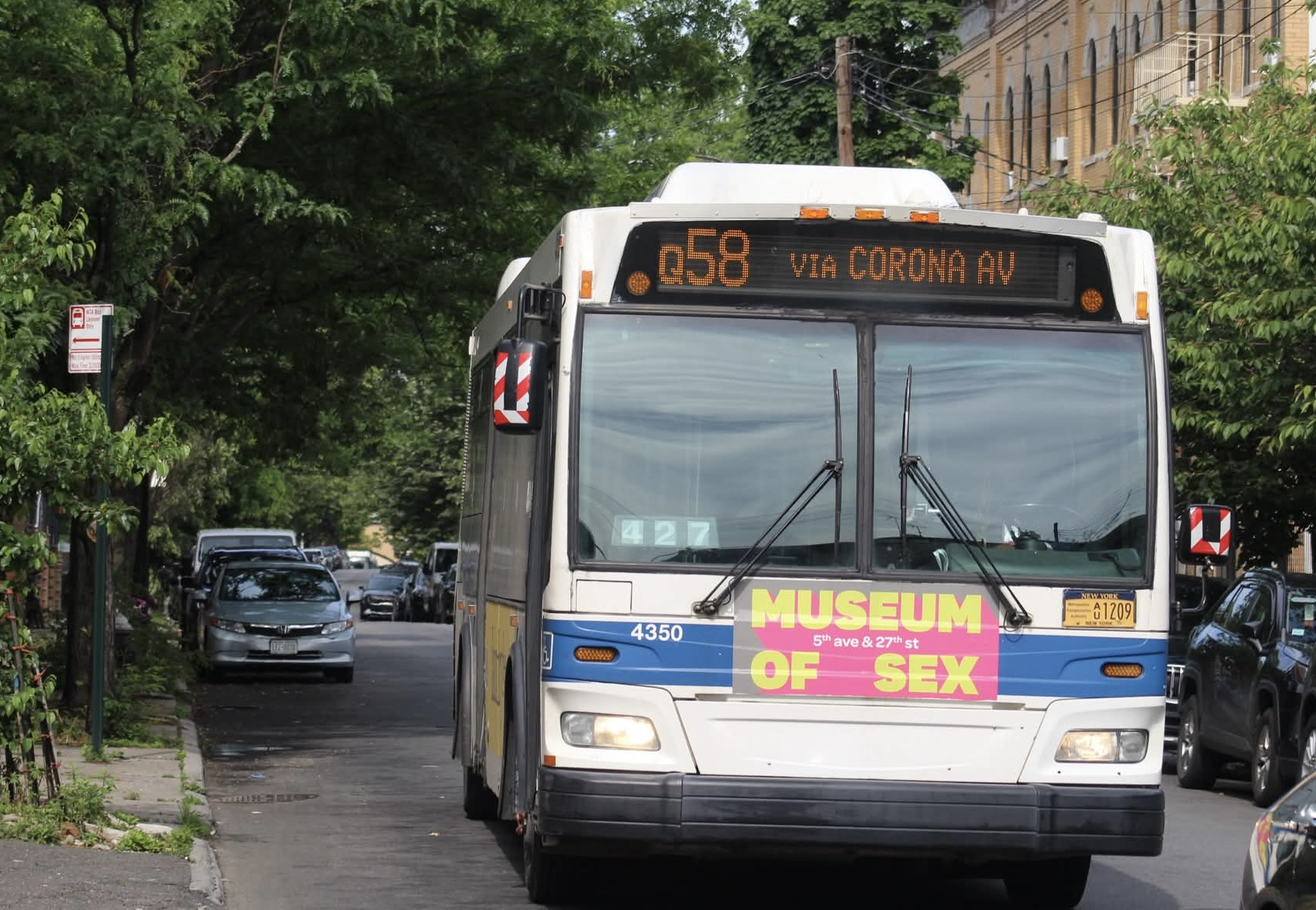
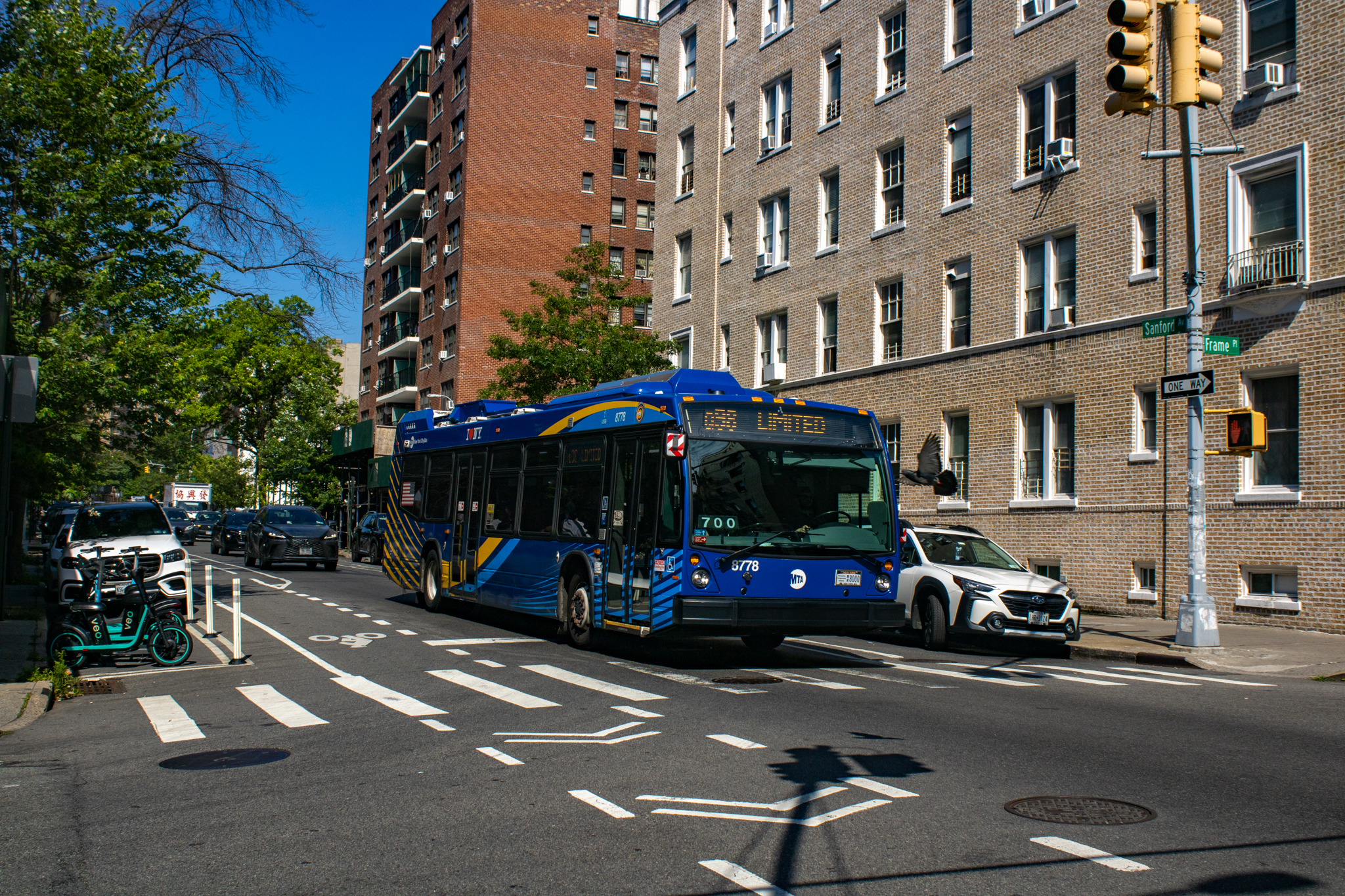
- 2009 Orion VII NG No. 4350 on the Q58 and 2021 LFS No. 8778 on the Q98

Overview
- System: MTA Regional Bus Operations
- Operator: New York City Transit Authority
- Garage: Casey Stengel Depot
- Vehicle: New Flyer Xcelsior XD40; Nova Bus LFS; Orion VII NG HEV
- Began service: June 20, 1896 (Fresh Pond Road Line); November 1899 (Flushing–Ridgewood Line); July 17, 1949 (bus); September 12, 2010 (Q58 Limited); June 29, 2025 (Q98 Limited)

Route
- Locale: Queens, New York, U.S.
- Communities served: Ridgewood, Maspeth, Elmhurst, Corona, Rego Park, Forest Hills, Flushing
- Start: Ridgewood Intermodal Terminal
- Via: Fresh Pond Road, Flushing Avenue, Grand Avenue, Broadway/Corona Avenue (Q58 only), Queens Boulevard (Q98 only), Horace Harding Expressway, College Point Boulevard
- End: Flushing – Main Street & 41st Road
- Length: 8.3 miles (13.4 km) (Q58); 7.6 miles (12.2 km) (Q98)
- Other routes: Q59 Grand Street/Grand Avenue

Service
- Operates: 24 hours (Q58); All times except late nights (Q98)
- Annual patronage: 6,225,366 (Q58, 2025); 1,011,329 (Q98, 2025)
- Transfers: Yes
- Timetable: Q58/Q98

The Q58 and Q98 Limited are bus routes that constitute a public transit line operating primarily in Queens, New York City, with its southern terminal on the border with Brooklyn. Both routes are operated by the MTA New York City Transit Authority. Its precursor was a streetcar line that began operation in November 1899. and was known variously as the Flushing–Ridgewood Line, the Corona Avenue Line, and the Fresh Pond Road Line. The route became a bus line in 1949. Limited-stop service on the Q58 route was implemented in 2010 and was replaced with the brand-new Q98 in 2025.

The Q58 and Q98 operate between two major bus/subway hubs: the Ridgewood Terminal on the border of Ridgewood, Queens and Bushwick, Brooklyn; and the Flushing – Main Street terminal in Downtown Flushing, Queens. The Q58 is the busiest bus line in the borough of Queens, and the second busiest in the city, after the M15, with 6.23 million people riding the route in 2025.

== Route description ==
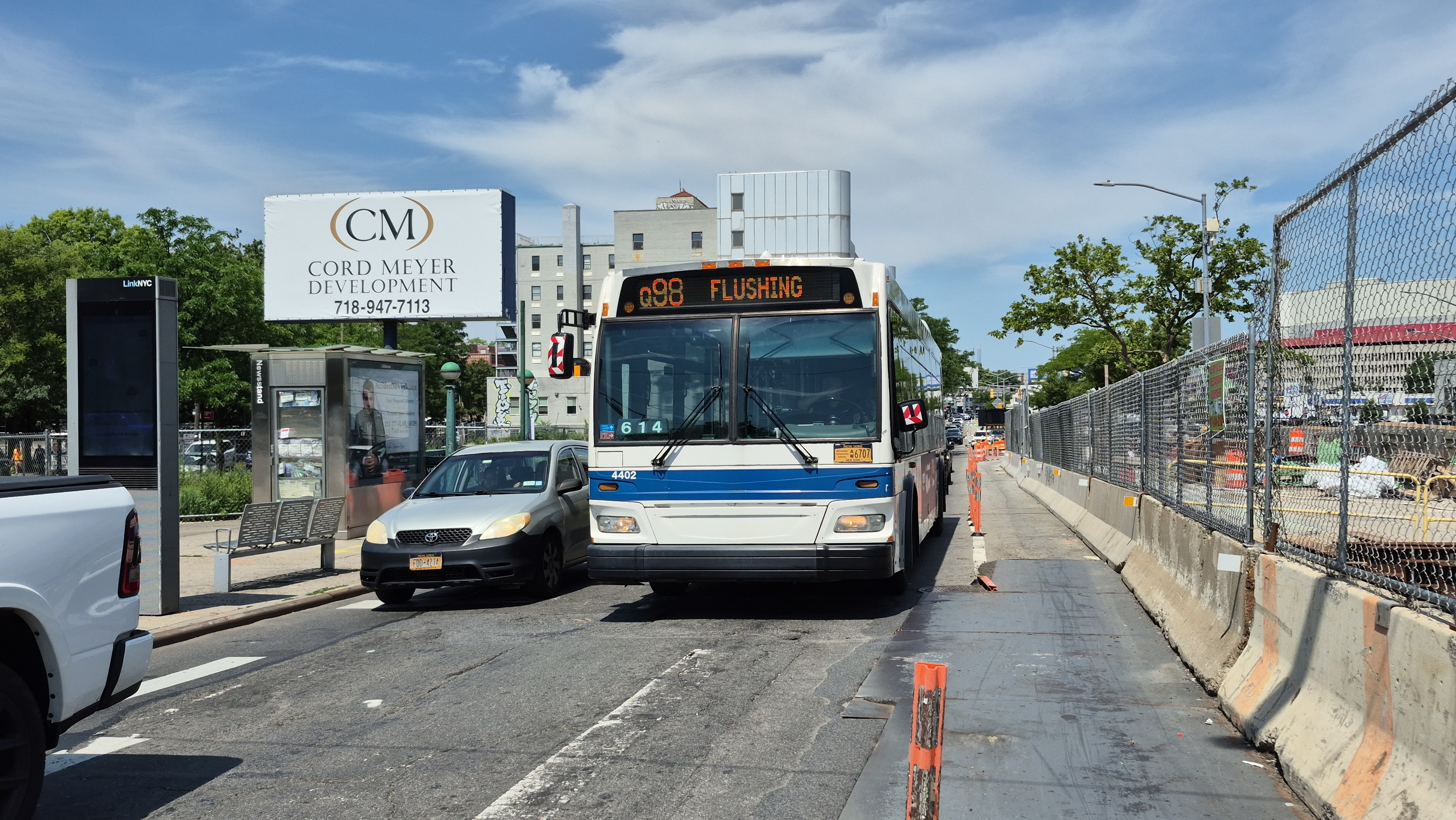
2009 Orion 7 NG HEV #4402 on the Flushing-bound Q98 at Woodhaven Blvd and Queens Blvd

A 2014-15 NFI Xcelsior XD40 (7424) heading towards Ridgewood, Brooklyn on the Q98 Limited

The original route of the Flushing–Ridgewood streetcar began at 41st Road and Main Street in Downtown Flushing, just south of the Main Street station of the Long Island Rail Road, and several blocks south of the Main Street subway station on the IRT Flushing Line. It ran south on Lawrence and Rodman Streets, and west on Horace Harding Boulevard to Corona, crossing the Flushing River at Strong's Causeway. It then ran generally west along the winding Corona Avenue to Queens Boulevard in Elmhurst, and on Grand Avenue to Maspeth. Between Junction Boulevard in Corona and the intersection of Grand and Flushing Avenues in Maspeth, the line shared a right-of-way with the Grand Street Line. After a short portion on Flushing Avenue and 61st Street, it ran south down Fresh Pond Road to the Fresh Pond Road station of the BMT Myrtle Avenue Line, where a major trolley barn existed. It then followed the right-of-way of the Myrtle El and former Lutheran Cemetery Surface Line to its own dedicated barn at the Ridgewood Depot, located at Palmetto Street underneath the Myrtle–Wyckoff Avenue elevated station.

The current Q58 bus route follows the former trolley route, with some exceptions. The right-of-ways of Lawrence Street and Rodman Street along the route have since been replaced with College Point Boulevard, while the Long Island Expressway was built over the corridor containing Horace Harding Boulevard and Strong's Causeway. Some northbound buses may terminate at Long Island Expressway and 108th Street, and some southbound buses may terminate at Fresh Pond Road and 67th Avenue. The former trolley barn at Fresh Pond Road is now the Fresh Pond Bus Depot in Ridgewood, where the route was dispatched from until 2025 (during 2019, the route was dispatched from the Grand Avenue Depot in Maspeth). Due to using several different streets, including winding roads and many tight turns, the Q58 consistently ranks among the slowest bus routes in New York City, and has been cited for pedestrian safety issues. Short strips of the trolley tracks still exist in Ridgewood, at 60th Place and at Woodbine Street underneath the Myrtle El. Tracks on the rest of the route were paved over.

The Q98 generally follows the Q58's route, except for between the Grand Avenue–Queens Boulevard and Horace Harding Boulevard–108th Street intersections. Eastbound (toward Flushing), the Q58 and Q98 begins at Ridgewood Terminal and follows several local streets to reach Fresh Pond Road, where it turns north. The Q58 and Q98 then turn east along Grand Avenue and continue to Queens Boulevard.

The Q58 continues north along Broadway, east along Corona Avenue, and then south along 108th Street before turning east along the Horace Harding Expressway. The Q98 takes a more direct route east of the Grand Avenue–Queens Boulevard intersection, turning southeast along Queens Boulevard and east along Horace Harding Expressway. Both routes turn north along College Point Boulevard to 41st Road, where they turn east, terminating at Main Street. The westbound routes (toward Ridgewood) are mostly the same as their Flushing-bound counterparts, except that they begin at Sanford Avenue instead of 41st Road and use different streets in Ridgewood.

=== School trippers ===
When school is in session, five buses originate at 74th Street to accommodate students at Maspeth High School. Of the four 2:30 trips, one heads to Ridgewood and three head to Flushing, with one bus terminating at Horace Harding Expressway. One more bus departs for Flushing at 2:35.

Several more trips accommodate students at nearby I.S. 73 by originating at 71st Street. The first two depart for Horace Harding Expressway at 2:25, and three more depart for Flushing at 2:30. The last two that head for Flushing at 2:35 do not stop outside the school.

All eastbound trippers use the Q58 designation and run via Corona Avenue.

== History ==
=== Streetcar service ===
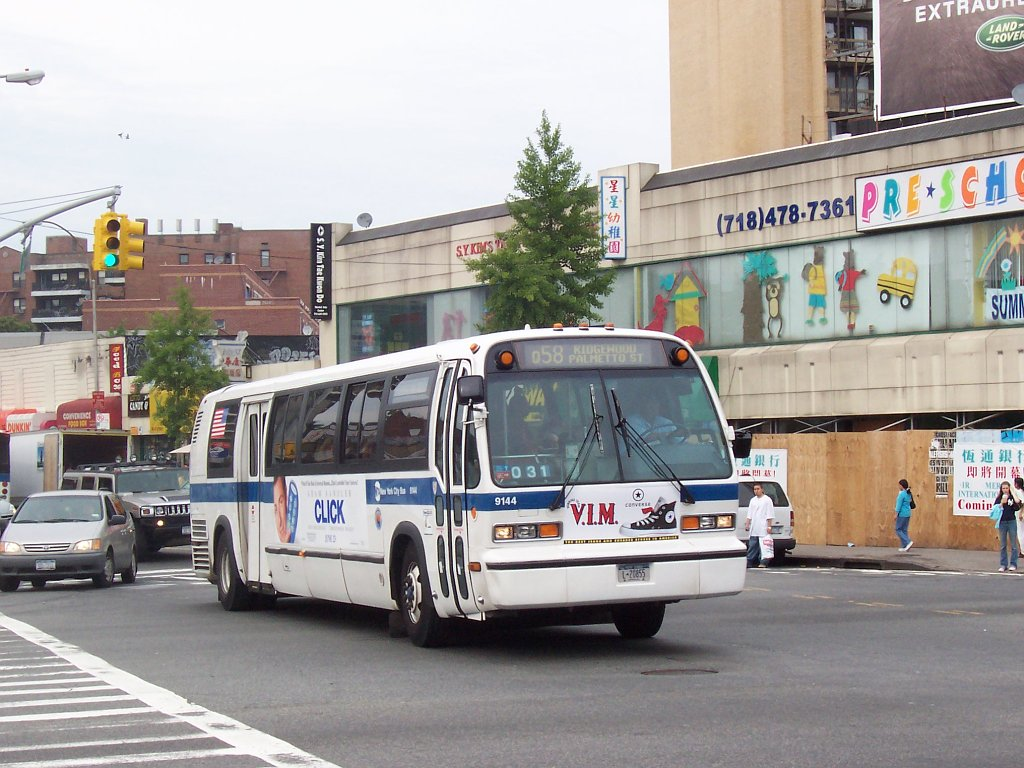
A 1996 Nova Bus RTS-06 (9144) on the Ridgewood-bound Q58 bus entering service in Flushing.

The streetcar line was operated by the Brooklyn and Queens Transit Corporation, a subsidiary of the Brooklyn Rapid Transit Company (BRT) and later Brooklyn–Manhattan Transit Corporation (BMT) which operated many streetcar lines, and several rapid transit lines including some of the city's first subway lines. The line began operation on June 20, 1896, as the Fresh Pond Road Line. It ran the same route as the modern Q58 from Ridgewood to Corona, turning north at Junction Boulevard (then Junction Avenue) and Corona Avenue towards Bowery Bay (the current site of LaGuardia Airport).

In November 1899, the Flushing–Ridgewood routing began service. Around this time, the Junction Boulevard portion of the line became a shuttle known as the North Beach Line, while the Grand Street Line was truncated to the Maspeth Trolley Depot at Grand Avenue and 69th Street. On October 19, 1919, the line was extended from the Fresh Pond Depot south to Ridgewood terminal at the Brooklyn-Queens line. Between 1939 and 1940, the line served passengers going to the 1939 New York World's Fair in Flushing Meadows–Corona Park.

=== Bus service ===
Beginning in the 1920s, many streetcar lines in Queens, Brooklyn, and the rest of the city began to be replaced by buses, particularly after the unification of city's three primary transit companies (including the BMT) under municipal operations in June 1940. Buses began running on the line as early as 1946. On June 30, 1949, the New York City Board of Estimate approved the full motorization of the line with buses. The Flushing–Ridgewood line was officially replaced by city-owned buses on July 17, 1949, The line was designated B58 ("B" the designation for buses based in Brooklyn), and the line was renamed the Corona Avenue Line. The early fleet consisted of General Motors-built buses.

On July 27, 1960, the B58 was moved to the newly opened Fresh Pond Bus Depot, after operating from bus depots in Brooklyn. During the 1964 New York World's Fair, the B58 was rerouted to stop at the Rodman Street entrance of Flushing Meadows Park. On December 11, 1988, the B58 was renumbered to the Q58. Due to slow trips and high passenger load, limited-stop service was added to the route on September 12, 2010. Community Boards 5 and 8 had been asking for the introduction of limited-stop service for the Q58 for years, but limited service was only added at this time because the Q58 had reached the headway required for limited-stop service. Until at least 2014, Casey Stengel Depot operated school trippers to Junction Boulevard. On January 6, 2019, the Q58 was moved to the Grand Avenue Depot, possibly in preparation for conversion to Select Bus Service (SBS), since the Grand Avenue Depot can hold the articulated buses used on the SBS system. However, the Q58 was moved back to the Fresh Pond Depot on January 19, 2020.

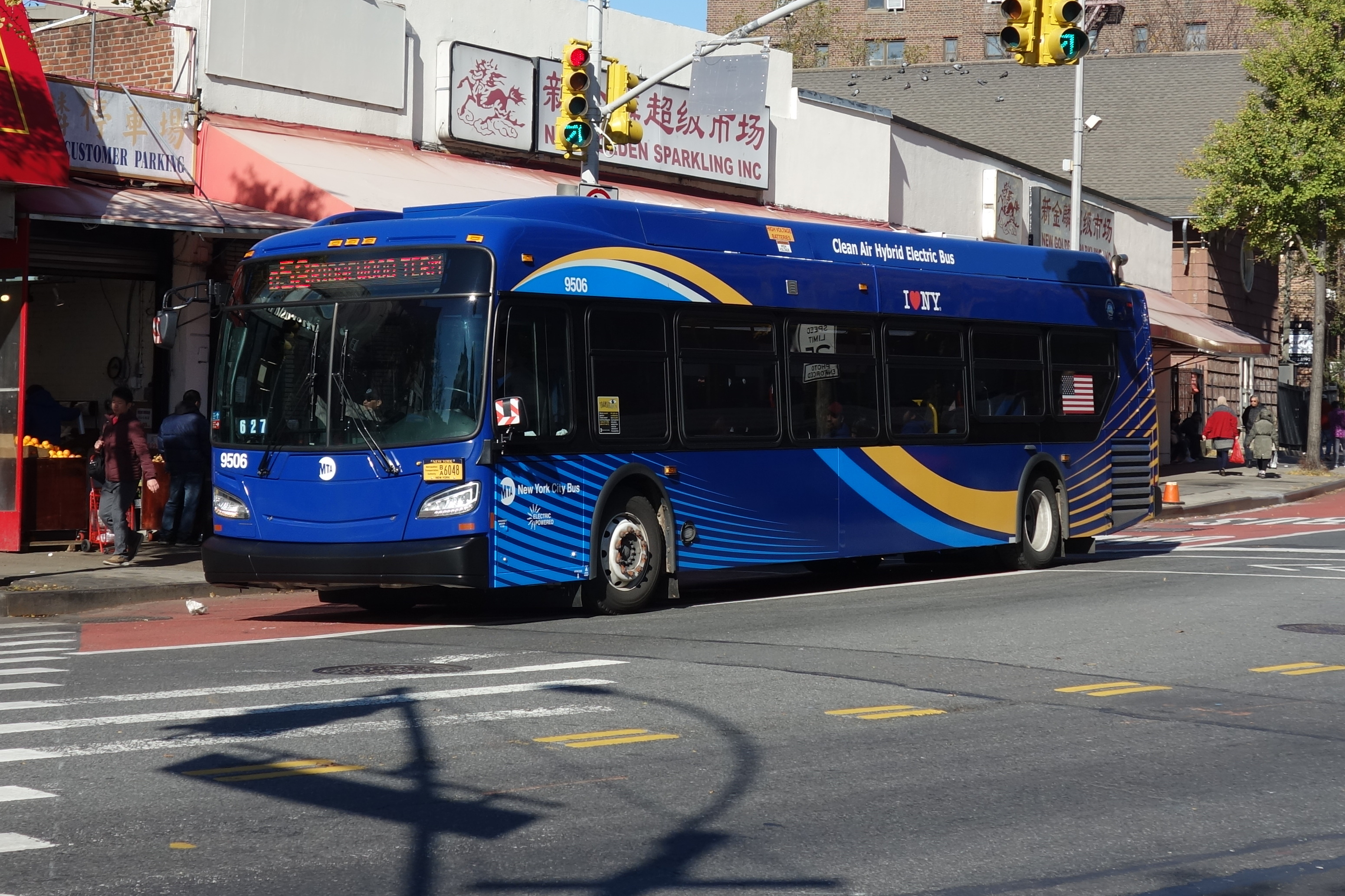
A 2018 XDE40 (9506) on the Q58 at Broadway/Justice Avenue in November 2019, when the Q58 was assigned to Grand Avenue Depot

==== Bus redesign ====
In December 2019, the MTA released a draft redesign of the Queens bus network. As part of the redesign, the Q58 would have become an "intra-borough" route called the QT58, and it would be rerouted east of 108th Street to use Roosevelt Avenue rather than Horace Harding Expressway and College Point Boulevard. A new "high-density" route known as the QT6 would have been created, running parallel to the QT58 from Myrtle–Wyckoff Avenues to Grand Avenue–Newtown before running along Queens Boulevard, Horace Harding Expressway, and College Point Boulevard. The QT6 would have fewer stops than the QT58. The redesign was delayed due to the COVID-19 pandemic in New York City in 2020, and the original draft plan was dropped due to negative feedback.

A revised plan was released in March 2022. Under the new plan, the Q58 would use 111st Street and Roosevelt Avenue to cross Flushing Meadows Park. A new "crosstown" route with limited stops, the Q98, was also proposed; it would duplicate the QT6 proposal and would make many of the same stops as the existing Q58 Limited. West of the intersection of Grand Avenue and Queens Boulevard, the Q98 would follow the Q58. East of that intersection, the Q98 would run along Queens Boulevard, Horace Harding Expressway, and College Point Boulevard.

A final bus redesign plan was released in December 2023. The Q58 would retain its existing routing via Corona Avenue and the Long Island Expressway but would be a "limited" route, with slightly fewer stops than the existing Q58 local service. The new Q98 route would still be a crosstown or Select Bus Service route; it would follow the Q58 west of the intersection of Grand Avenue and Queens Boulevard, and it would run on Queens Boulevard, Horace Harding Expressway, and College Point Boulevard east of that intersection. The combined frequencies of the Q58 and Q98 would be increased slightly compared with the existing Q58/Q58 Limited service.

On December 17, 2024, addendums to the final plan were released. Among these, bus stops on the Q58 were rearranged, while select off-peak and weekend trips were moved back from the Q98 to the Q58. The Q98 was also changed to a "Limited" route. On January 29, 2025, the current plan was approved by the MTA Board, and the Queens Bus Redesign went into effect in two different phases during Summer 2025. The sole Q58 route was changed from “Limited” to “Local” after the approval, and both routes were assigned to Phase I, which started on June 29, 2025.

== Incidents ==
On June 21, 2017, a bus set in neutral went backwards along Palmetto Street and crashed into Saint Paul Lutheran Church on Knickerbocker Avenue after the driver completed a Q58 trip to Ridgewood. No one was hit by the bus, but a man was slightly injured from a life-saving jump.

== Connecting bus routes ==
- B13, B26, B52, B54, Q55 (at Ridgewood Term)
- B38 (at Seneca Avenue)
- Q14, Q39 (at Forest/Eliot Avenues)
- B20 (at Fresh Pond Road)
- Q54 (at Metropolitan Avenue)
- B57 (at Flushing Avenue)
- Q59 (at Grand Avenue)
- Q18, Q67 (at 69th Street)
- Q47 (at 79th/80th Streets)
- Q53 SBS, Q60 (at Queens Boulevard)
- Q29 (at 90th/92nd Streets)
- Q72 (at Junction Boulevard)
- Q14 (at National/99th Streets)
- Q23 (at 108th Street)
- Q88 (at Horace Harding Expressway)
- Q11, Q52 SBS (at Woodhaven Boulevard; Q98 only)
- Q20, Q44 SBS (at Main Street)
