= Myrtle Grove =

Myrtle Grove can refer to:

- Myrtle Grove, Bingley, United Kingdom
- Myrtle Grove, Youghal, Republic of Ireland
- Myrtle Grove, Florida, U.S.
- Myrtle Grove (Easton, Maryland), home on the U.S. National Register of Historic Places
- Myrtle Grove, North Carolina, in New Hanover County, U.S.
- Myrtle Grove Plantation, Tensas Parish, Louisiana, on the U.S. NRHP
- Myrtle Grove Plantation, Georgia, U.S.
