= B13 (New York City bus) =

Bus route in Brooklyn, New York

b13
- Gates Avenue Line; Crescent Street Line
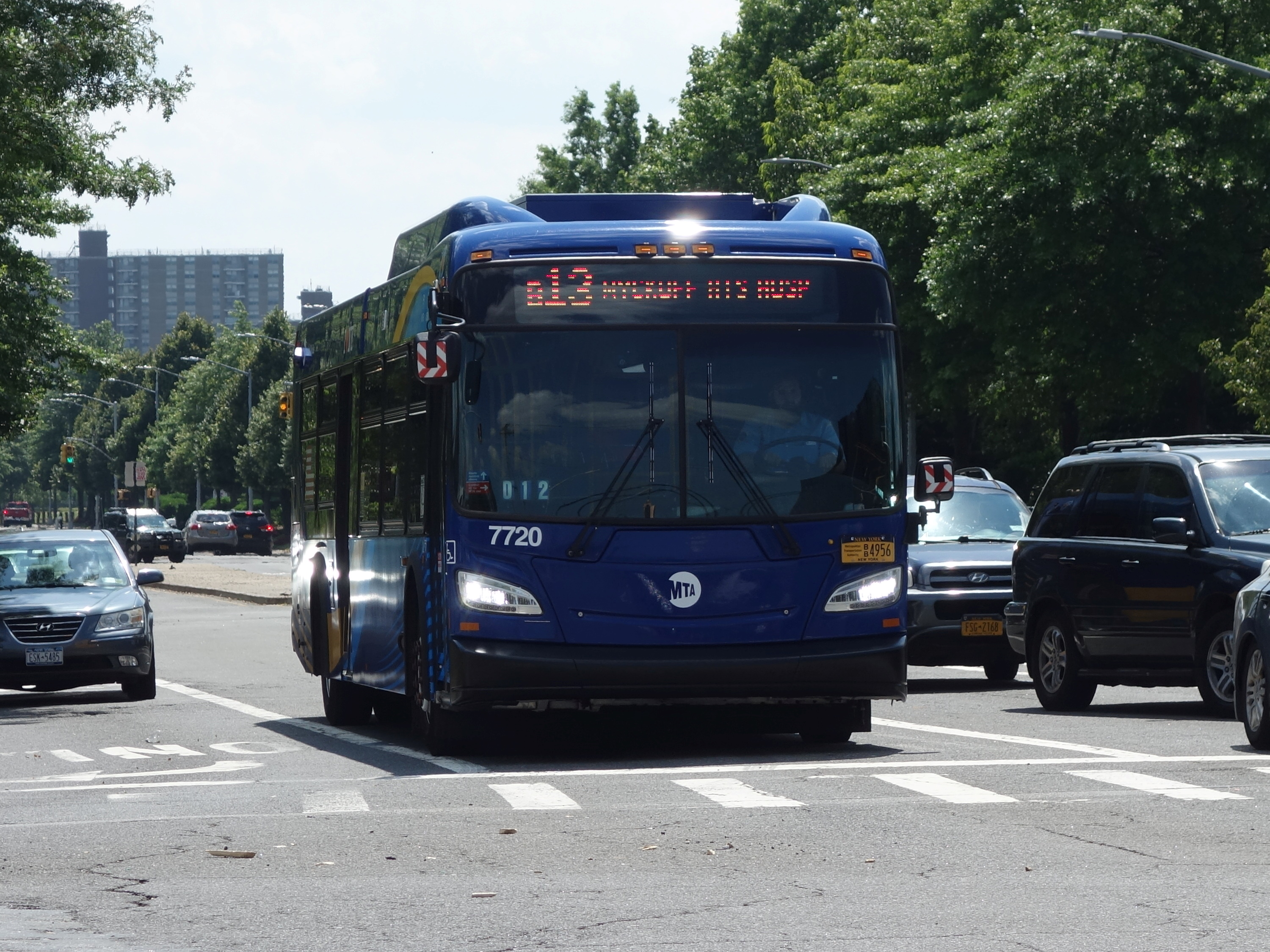
- A 2018 XD40 (7720) on the Bushwick-bound B13 at Seaview Avenue/Erskine Street in July 2019.

Overview
- System: MTA Regional Bus Operations
- Operator: New York City Transit Authority
- Garage: Fresh Pond Depot
- Vehicle: New Flyer Xcelsior XD40
- Began service: October 25, 1921

Route
- Locale: Brooklyn and Queens, New York, U.S.
- Communities served: Spring Creek, East New York, Cypress Hills, Glendale, Ridgewood, Bushwick
- Start: Spring Creek - Gateway Center North at Gateway Drive and Schroeders Avenue
- Via: Linden Boulevard, Euclid Avenue, Crescent Street, Cypress Hills Street, Cooper Avenue, Fresh Pond Road, Gates Avenue, Wyckoff Avenue
- End: Bushwick - Wyckoff Heights Hospital at Wyckoff Avenue and DeKalb Avenue
- Length: 8.7 miles (14.0 km)

Service
- Operates: 4:16 AM-1:17 AM
- Annual patronage: 1,331,260 (2025)
- Transfers: Yes
- Timetable: B13
- Map: B13 map via MTA Bus Time
Route map
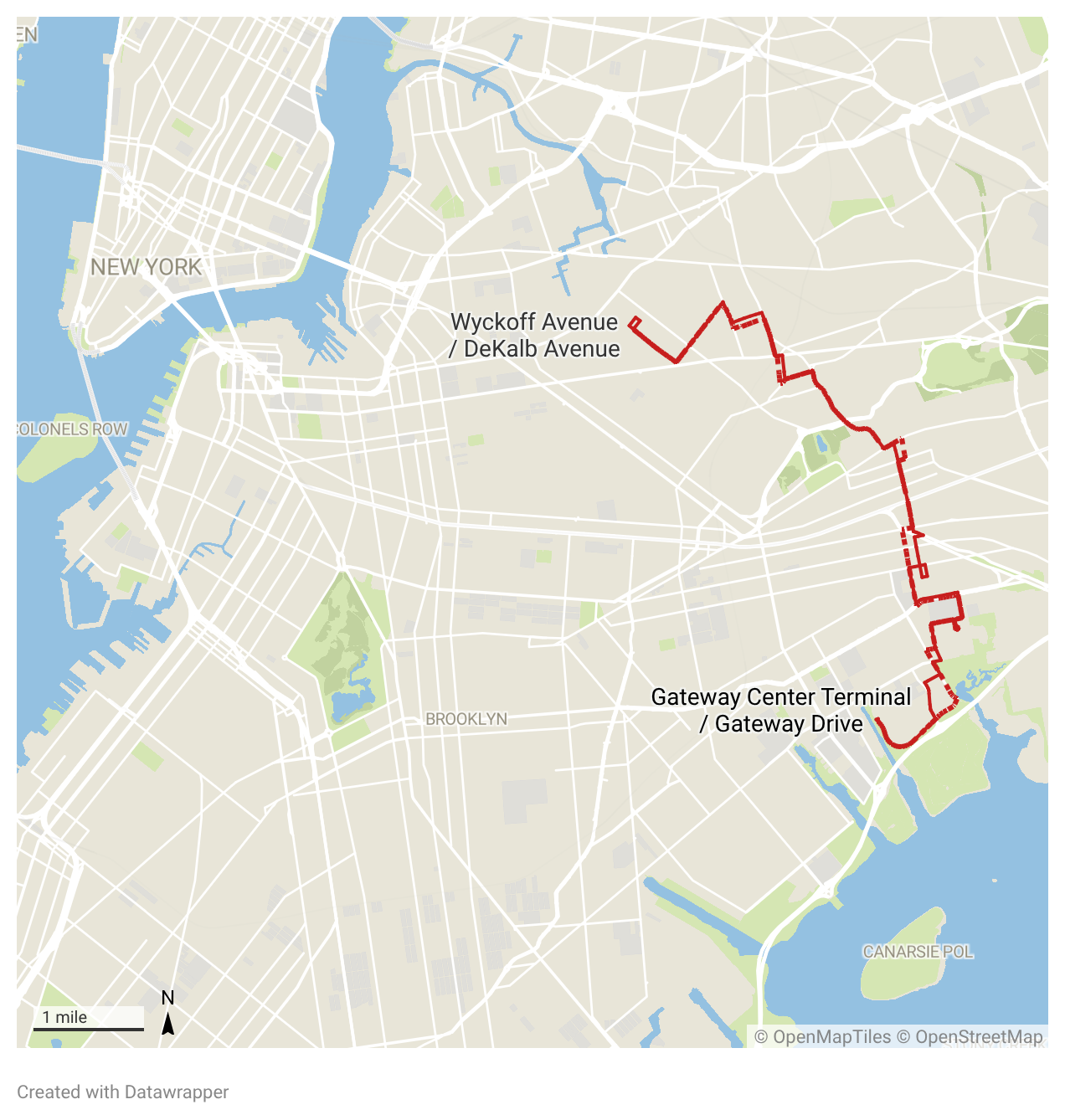


The B13 is a bus route in the New York City borough of Brooklyn, which serves the corridor of Crescent Street, as well as Gates Avenue north of the Myrtle–Wyckoff Avenues station. Originally operated by Independent Buses, it is now operated by MTA Regional Bus Operations under the New York City Transit brand.

== Route description ==
The B13 route begins at Gateway Center Mall in Spring Creek. First, the route goes around Gateway Drive. Then northbound buses head to Fountain Avenue via Erskine Street and Vandalia Avenue, while southbound buses stay on Fountain Avenue, heading to Gateway via Seaview Avenue. From Fountain, northbound buses use Flatlands Avenue to get to the first stretch of Crescent Street, with southbound buses using Cozine Avenue instead. All buses run via the Brooklyn General Mail Facility bus loop, using Stanley Avenue, Eldert Lane and Linden Boulevard. Then it makes a right onto Euclid Avenue. From there, northbound buses head to the next stretch of Crescent Street via Sutter Avenue, while southbound buses stay on Euclid. Part of Crescent is cut off by Conduit Boulevard, so northbound buses use Glenmore Avenue to go around the blockage, while southbound buses use Liberty Avenue. The rest of Crescent Street is served by all B13 service, except for southbound service north of Etna Street, in which it runs on Jamaica Avenue and Hemlock Street instead. Northbound buses turn onto Jamaica from Crescent. They then make a right on Cypress Hills Street and a left on Cooper Avenue. Northbound buses run to Myrtle Avenue via 62nd Street, while southbound buses head back via 61st Street. Next, they make a right turn onto Fresh Pond Road. Then, they head to Forest Avenue via Putnam Avenue and straight onto Gates Avenue northbound or via Grandview and 67th Avenues southbound. It continues until the Myrtle-Wyckoff Avenues station, making a right on Wyckoff Avenue and then a right on DeKalb Avenue, where it terminates. Buses then deadhead via Saint Nicholas Avenue and Hart Street to begin southbound service.

== History ==
The B13 route began on October 25, 1921 under the operation of Independent Buses. It was then operated by the Brooklyn-Manhattan Transit Corporation years later, before it was sold to the City on June 1, 1940. The original route was between the Cypress Hills station and Seaview Avenue. On May 1, 1938, it was merged with the first B19 route, which ran from Cypress Hills to Forest Avenue and 67th Avenue via Cypress Hills Street and Fresh Pond Road. It was then extended to Ridgewood Terminal around 1947.

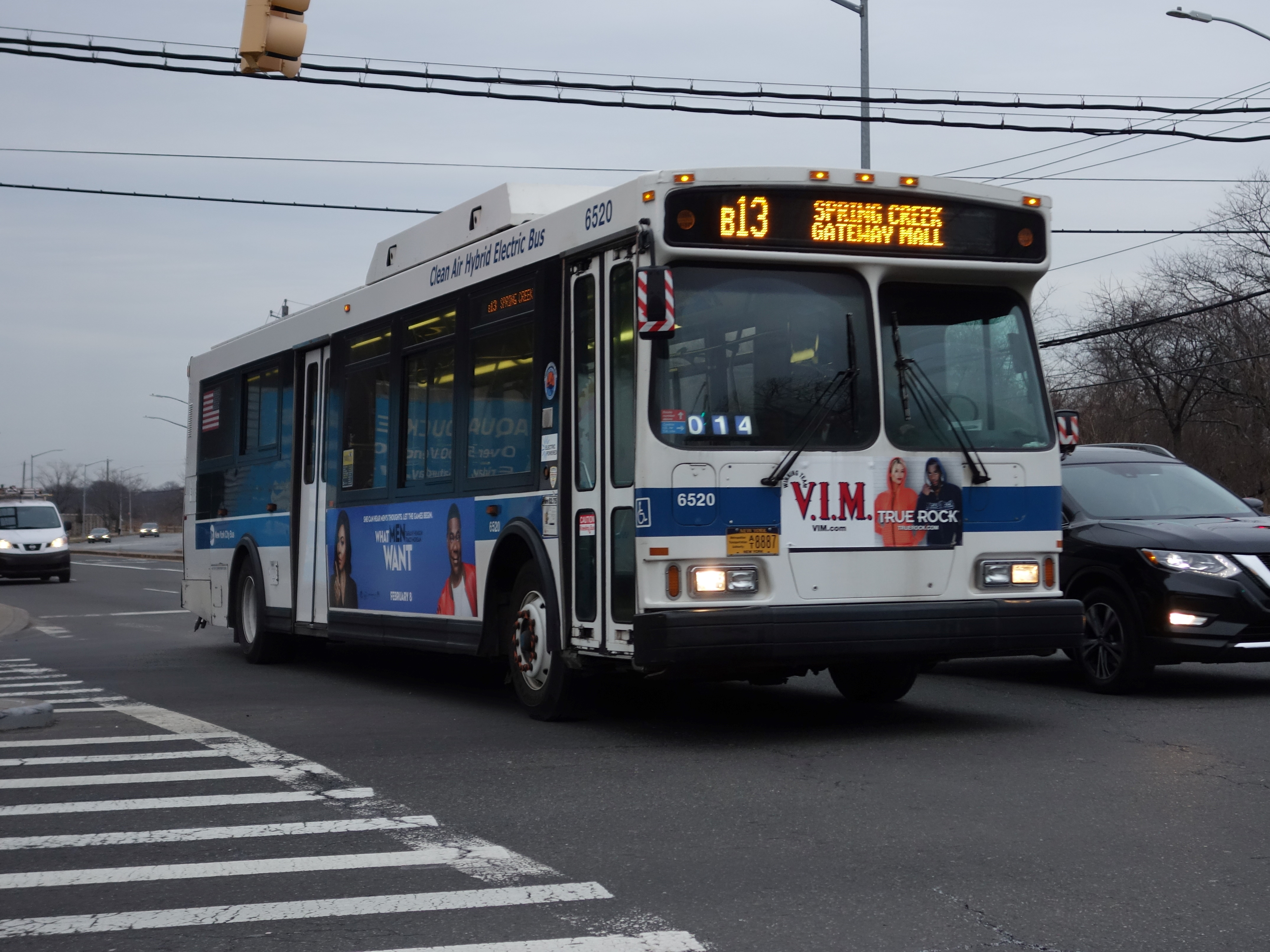
A 2004 Orion VII OG HEV (6520) on the Spring Creek-bound B13 at Erskine Street/Seaview Avenue in February 2019

Until September 8, 2002, the B18 bus route ran between the Cypress Hills station and Metropolitan Avenue in Williamsburg via Cypress Avenue, Wyckoff Avenue, Morgan Avenue and Grand Street. The two routes merged into an extension of the B13, with service on Cypress Avenue discontinued and southbound service on Linden Street rerouted to Gates Avenue. It was also rerouted to Flushing and Bushwick Avenues in Bushwick, and from Crescent Street to Eldert Lane in East New York, matching the B15 and B20 buses serving the Postal Facility. It was then extended to Gateway Mall in April 2003, six months after the mall opened.

On June 27, 2010, the B13 was cut back on its northern end to Wyckoff Heights Hospital in Bushwick due to a budget crisis. The original plan was to revert to the B13’s pre-2002 service, but there was opposition about the lack of service to the hospital, resulting in a slight re-extension. On August 31, 2014, the B13 was extended further into Gateway Mall to the north side due to its opening.

On December 1, 2022, the MTA released a draft redesign of the Brooklyn bus network. As part of the redesign, the B13 would gain northbound service to Shirley Chisholm State Park via Seaview and Fountain Avenues, and it would no longer serve the Brooklyn General Mail Facility, using the Q8 route to/from Euclid Avenue in both directions. It would also follow a path similar to the former B18 route, but would provide direct service to the Ridgewood Reservoir, using Highland Boulevard and Vermont Place instead of Cypress Hills Street to get to Cypress Avenue. The B13 would continue to run on Gates Avenue in both directions and the Wyckoff Hospital terminal would be maintained. Closely spaced stops would also be eliminated. People have been asking for bus service to the Ridgewood Reservoir, but the reroute was met with objection from residents of Liberty Park. Also, the route would be scheduled to run at all times.

== See also ==
- B38 (at DeKalb Avenue)
- B26, B52, B54, Q58, Q98 (at Ridgewood Term)
- Q14, Q39 (at Forest Avenue)
- B20, QM24, QM25, QM34 (at Fresh Pond Road)
- Q7, Q56 (at Jamaica Avenue)
- Q24 (at Atlantic Avenue)
- Q8, Q112 (at Pitkin Avenue)
- B14 (at Sutter Avenue)
- B15, BM5 (at Linden Boulevard)
- B83, B84 (at Gateway Mall)
