= Jackie Robinson Parkway =

Highway in New York

Jackie Robinson Parkway
- Jackie Robinson Parkway highlighted in red

Route information
- Maintained by NYSDOT
- Length: 4.95 mi (7.97 km)
- Existed: 1935–present
- Restrictions: No commercial vehicles

Major junctions
- West end: Jamaica Avenue / Pennsylvania Avenue / Bushwick Avenue in East New York
- East end: I-678 / Grand Central Parkway in Kew Gardens

Location
- Country: United States
- State: New York
- Counties: Kings, Queens

Highway system
- New York Highways; Interstate; US; State; Reference; Parkways

The Jackie Robinson Parkway (originally the Interboro Parkway) is a 4.95-mile (7.97 km) controlled-access parkway in the New York City boroughs of Brooklyn and Queens. The western terminus of the parkway is at Jamaica Avenue in the Brooklyn neighborhood of East New York. It runs through Highland Park, along the north side of Ridgewood Reservoir, and through Forest Park. The eastern terminus is at the Kew Gardens Interchange in Kew Gardens, Queens, where the Jackie Robinson Parkway meets the Grand Central Parkway and Interstate 678 (I-678, the Van Wyck Expressway). It is designated New York State Route 908B (NY 908B), an unsigned reference route.

The Interboro Parkway was first proposed in 1901 as part of an extension of Eastern Parkway. There were multiple attempts to construct the parkway between the 1900s and the 1920s, which failed due to a lack of funding and various disagreements over land acquisition. The parkway's route was finalized in 1930, and work on the central section through Mount Carmel and Cypress Hills cemeteries began in 1931. Construction on the rest of the parkway did not begin until 1933. Most of the parkway opened to traffic in July 1935, but the westernmost section was not completed until that September. Over the years, the Interboro Parkway gained a reputation for being dangerous because of its sharp turns and narrow lanes. The Interboro Parkway was renamed for Major League Baseball player Jackie Robinson in 1997.

== Route description ==
The Jackie Robinson Parkway starts at an intersection with Jamaica, Pennsylvania, and Bushwick avenues in the East New York neighborhood in Brooklyn. The westernmost four exits are located within the Cemetery Belt, near Brooklyn's border with Queens. The parkway runs east from Bushwick Avenue to Highland Park, where it curves around the north side of the Ridgewood Reservoir. Exit 1, Highland Boulevard, is a westbound exit and eastbound entrance. The parkway passes Mount Judah Cemetery before exit 2 at Vermont Place and Cypress Avenue, which lead to Highland Park and the Hungarian Cemetery. The parkway then continues through Mount Carmel Cemetery and Cypress Hills Cemetery, where there are retaining walls on both sides of the highway. Exit 3, Cypress Hills Street, leads to Cypress Hills Cemetery, where Jackie Robinson is buried.

At exit 4, Forest Park Drive, the parkway enters Forest Park in Queens. Exit 5 is Myrtle Avenue. At exit 6, Metropolitan Avenue, Union Turnpike straddles the parkway, but there is no access to or from Union Turnpike. The parkway and Union Turnpike then exit Forest Park and go under Queens Boulevard (NY 25) and above the New York City Subway's IND Queens Boulevard Line. Union Turnpike shares a diamond interchange with Queens Boulevard, but there is no access from the parkway. Exits 7 and 8, both at the Kew Gardens Interchange at the Jackie Robinson Parkway's eastern end, are both eastbound-only. Exit 7 goes to the Van Wyck Expressway (I-678) northbound (there is no access southbound), while exits 8E and 8W lead to the Grand Central Parkway's eastbound and westbound lanes, respectively. There were originally 23 or 26 bridges carrying the parkway below and above roads or railroad tracks.

=== Safety ===
The parkway has several sharp curves throughout its route, particularly within the cemeteries. The curves exist because, at the time of the parkway's construction, planners wished to disturb as few graves as possible. As designed, the curves limited the design speed of the Interboro Parkway to 35 miles per hour (56 km/h). The curves are particularly hazardous; The New York Times wrote in 1997 that the parkway has been nicknamed "Suicide Row", "Slaughter Parkway" and "Death Alley" throughout the years.

A junction at the eastern end of the parkway was placed on the list of New York State's most dangerous roads in 2007, based on accident data from 2004 to 2006.

== Planning ==
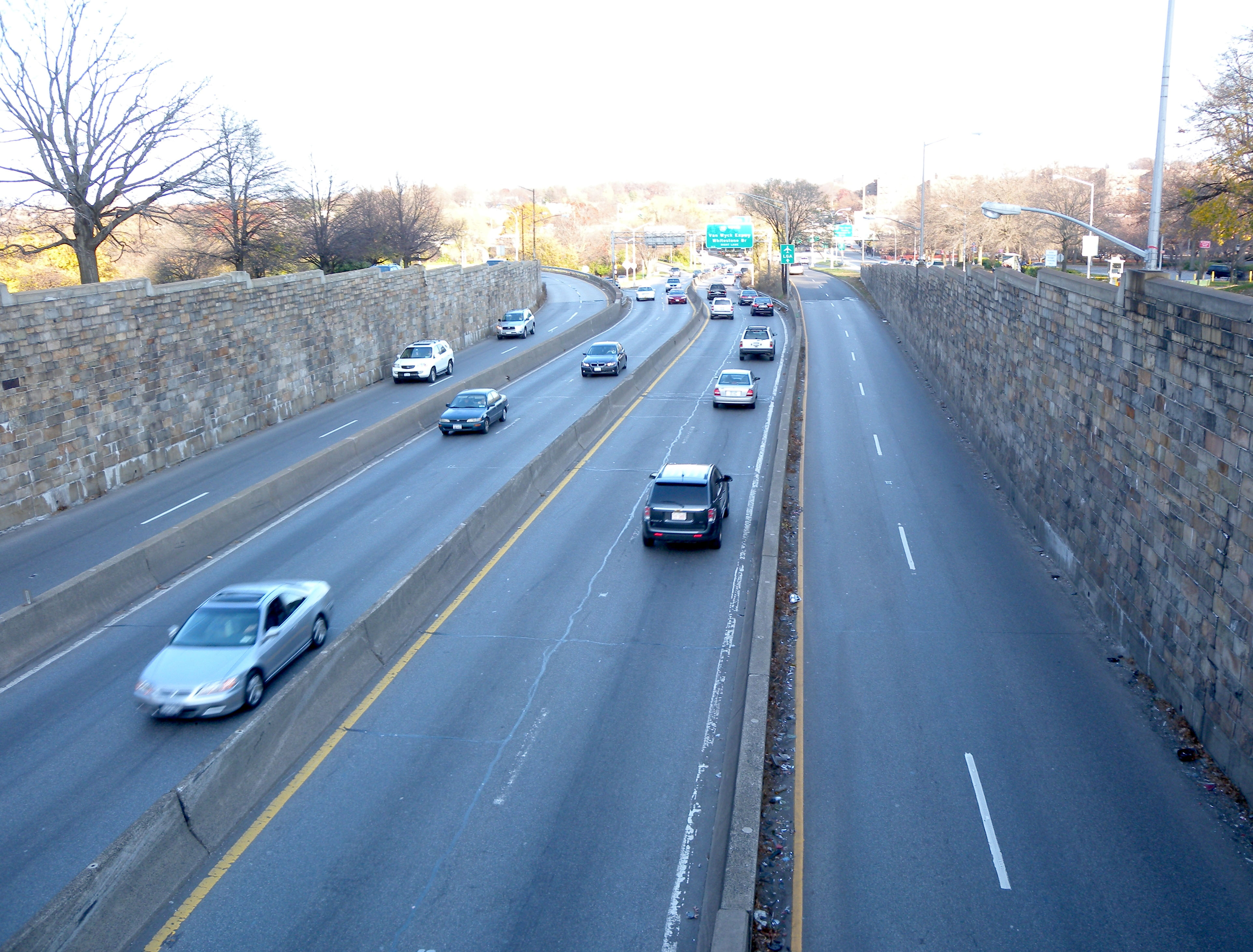
Just east of Queens Boulevard, approaching the eastern terminus. Union Turnpike straddles the road here.

Frederick Law Olmsted and Calvert Vaux, who designed Prospect Park, had suggested the construction of Eastern Parkway and Ocean Parkway in 1866; the two parkways extended east and south of Prospect Park, respectively. Eastern Parkway was completed in the mid-1870s and originally terminated at Ralph Avenue. In the early 1890s, Brooklyn officials proposed extending the parkway northeast to near Cemetery of the Evergreens, Highland Park, and the Ridgewood Reservoir along Brooklyn and Queens' Cemetery Belt. Eastern Parkway itself was extended as far as Bushwick Avenue, and another road called Highland Boulevard continued eastward from Bushwick Avenue to Highland Park. Governor Levi P. Morton signed legislation to authorize the parkway's extension in 1896. The Eastern Parkway Extension, along with Highland Boulevard, had been completed by 1897. What became Jackie Robinson Parkway originated from plans to extend Eastern Parkway even further.

=== Early plans ===
==== 1890s and 1900s proposals ====
After the consolidation of the City of Greater New York in 1898, there were proposals to extend Eastern Parkway further east to Forest Park in Queens. Brooklyn officials suggested a further extension as far east as Dry Harbor Road and then toward Hoffman Boulevard (now Queens Boulevard). An extension of Eastern Parkway following a similar route was suggested in 1899 by the Queens County Topographical Bureau, the extension running through Cypress Hills Cemetery and Forest Park to Dry Harbor Road. By 1901, Brooklyn surveyor Noyes F. Palmer had proposed extending Eastern Parkway another 2 miles (3.2 km) eastward into Forest Park. The same year, state legislators proposed amending the Rural Cemetery Act to allow the construction of a road through the Cemetery Belt; this was the first bill to propose what would become the Interborough Parkway. Though nearby property owners supported the parkway's extension, the cemeteries' owners opposed it. Opponents said the roadway would displace about 300 graves and that it would divide the cemeteries, and the Cypress Hills Cemetery Corporation later claimed that the bodies physically could not be removed. The bill passed both houses of the New York State Legislature, only to be vetoed by mayor Robert Anderson Van Wyck.

The legislation for a road through the Cemetery Belt was reintroduced in the state legislature in 1902 and in every year thereafter, but it failed to pass for most of the 1900s. Joseph Wagner, who had introduced the bill in the State Senate, proposed investigating the trustees of Cypress Hills Cemetery after the trustees opposed the legislation. When the bill was reintroduced in 1903, the Brooklyn Citizen wrote that the lands to be seized for the parkway were nearly empty; at the time, many local politicians, residents, and civic groups favored the bill. An opposing bill, passed in 1904, prohibited the construction of public roads through any cemetery in New York state unless a supermajority of the cemetery's trustees and lot owners supported the project. This effectively banned any further extension of Eastern Parkway through the Cemetery Belt to Forest Park.

Proponents of Eastern Parkway's extension continued to advocate their case. In 1906, a New York State Assembly member from Queens introduced a bill, which would allow a parkway to be built through Cypress Hills Cemetery with the New York City Board of Aldermen's consent, but it failed by a two-vote margin. A similar bill was introduced in the State Senate in 1907; it received less opposition than the previous bills for the road had. The legislation for the Cemetery Belt road was finally passed in 1908, permitting the construction of a 150-foot-wide (46 m) road through the cemeteries. The bill also authorized the Board of Estimate to survey the route's right-of-way. Supporters of the project said that the parkway's construction would not entail disturbing any graves at Cypress Hills Cemetery, since the Eastern Parkway extension would traverse the cemetery on three viaducts. Queens's deputy commissioner of public works, Alfred Denton, proposed extending the road as far east as Hoffman Boulevard without traveling through the Cemetery Belt. The city surveyed the route of the proposed Eastern Parkway extension, but work stopped due to a lack of money for construction.

==== 1910s proposals ====
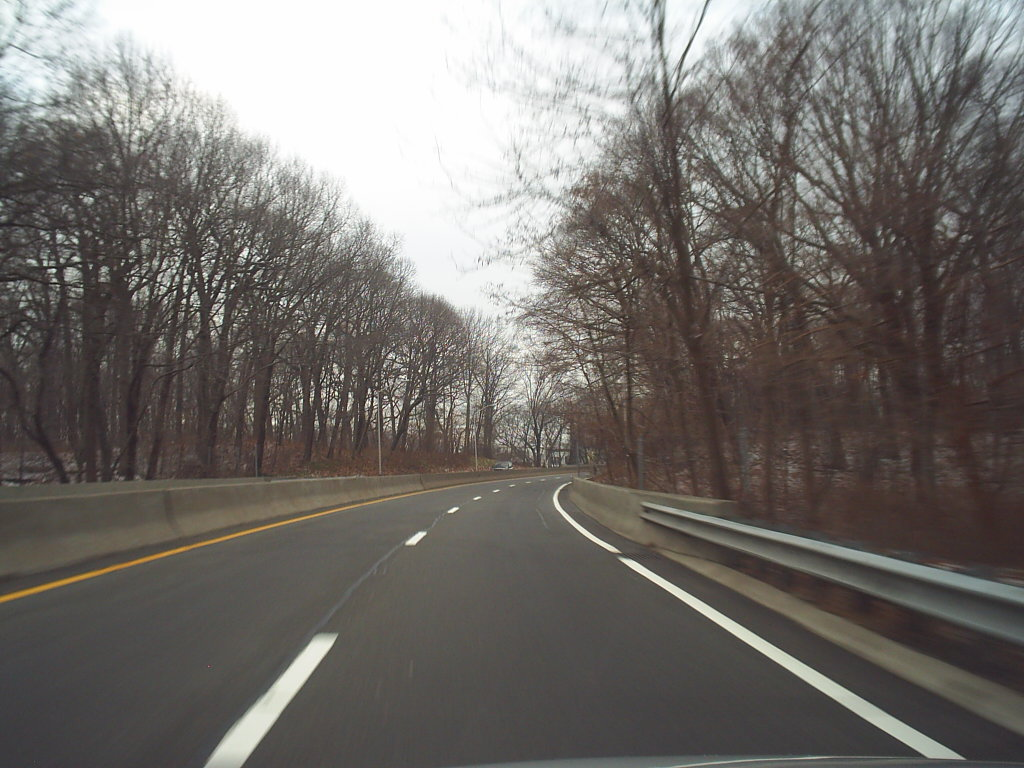
View of the Queens section of the parkway

Plans to construct a road through the Cemetery Belt were revived in 1911. The New York Times wrote that the proposed road would "open up a most pleasant and easy way of getting to and from Queens by automobile by way of Brooklyn". At the time, very few streets connected southern Brooklyn and Queens. The New York City Board of Estimate failed to allocate the required funds for the extension, though city officials held informal meetings about the roadway. By 1913, the plans called for about 2 miles (3.2 km) of new roadway, and the parkway had been narrowed to 100 feet (30 m). The road would have split from Highland Boulevard, run to the north of Ridgewood Reservoir, then continued eastward to Union Turnpike. The city government discussed the plans with the operators of Cypress Hills and Mount Carmel cemeteries, from which it planned to acquire land. Though Cypress Hills Cemetery's trustees were willing to sell their land for $1 per square foot ($11/m^{2}). more than what the city was willing to pay, Mount Carmel Cemetery's trustees were unwilling to sell their land at all. The city government agreed to acquire 11.2 acres (4.5 ha) from the two cemeteries, and the cemeteries' presidents were ready to accept the plans for the parkway by late 1913. Cypress Hills Cemetery's trustees agreed to sell their land for $0.35 per square foot ($3.77/m^{2}).

By February 1914, the New York City Board of Estimate was ready to consider plans for the parkway. At the time, the road was variously called the Cemetery Road, Interborough Parkway, or Eastern Parkway Extension. The Queens government appointed a committee of three men to determine what was needed for construction to begin, and the Queens Chamber of Commerce endorsed the parkway's construction. The Board of Estimate approved plans for the parkway that July; it also prepared a report on the parkway, which took more than a year to complete. After the parkway's route was approved, Queens's park department began growing 15,000 trees that were to be planted along the parkway, and the Queens Chamber of Commerce appointed a special committee to oversee the parkway's construction. The parkway was to be constructed in three sections: the westernmost portion in Highland Park, the central portion next to Cypress Avenue and the Ridgewood Reservoir, and the eastern section through Cypress Hills and Mount Carmel cemeteries.

The Board of Estimate also asked its Committee on Assessment to determine who should pay for the parkway, but this process had not been finalized by 1917. By then, the parkway's cost was estimated at $500,000. One proposal called for the cost to be divided evenly between the New York City, Brooklyn, and Queens governments. Another proposal called for the city to pay half the cost and the Brooklyn and Queens governments to split the other half; the Committee of Assessments recommended using this cost breakdown. Work still had not started by 1919, when the Queens Chamber of Commerce and the Queens borough president asked the parkway's construction to be expedited. By then, the Cypress Hills Cemetery's trustees were selling burial plots right next to the path of the proposed parkway.

=== 1920s plans ===
==== Revised proposal and approval ====
Little progress on the Interborough Parkway's construction had occurred by 1921, in part because Mount Carmel Cemetery burial-plot owners opposed constructing the parkway through that cemetery. Rabbis also opposed the parkway's construction because it would require moving hundreds of corpses from Mount Carmel and Cypress Hills cemeteries, including the bodies of many Jews, whose disinterment would violate Jewish tradition. As the presence of motor vehicles was increasing, by 1923, local civic associations were pressuring the government to build the road. The associations requested that the city government build the Interborough Parkway all the way east to the New York City border, connecting with another parkway in Nassau County (later the Northern State Parkway). The Board of Estimate proposed to construct the road if local residents financed the construction. Later that year, Board of Estimate chief engineer Arthur S. Tuttle received a revised proposal for the parkway's routing in Brooklyn, which would follow the border between Mount Carmel and Cypress Hills cemeteries. As opposed to the routing approved in 1914, which would have included a gradual curve to the northeast of Cypress Hills Street, this proposal would introduce a sharp curve about 450 feet (140 m) east of Cypress Hills Street.

In May 1924, Governor Al Smith signed a bill authorizing the city government to construct the parkway. The legislation required Tuttle to create a report on the parkway within one year. Tuttle recommended that 45% of the cost be covered by New York City, 35% by Brooklyn, 15% by Queens, and 5% by local residents. Amid continued opposition from religious groups, the Board of Estimate approved a revised plan for the parkway in May 1926, which would relocate 432 graves in Mount Carmel and Cypress Hills cemeteries. Tuttle sent the revised plan to Cypress Hills Cemetery's trustees for review that November. The trustees agreed to cede land for the parkway on the condition that work begin before January 1, 1928. Despite the Board of Estimate's claims that the project may delayed because of a lack of local interest, four civic groups asked the Board of Estimate to begin construction as soon as possible. Rabbis continued to oppose the project due to the disinterments, and Brooklyn's borough president James J. Byrne objected to the proposed cost breakdown for the parkway.

The Board of Estimate authorized the parkway's construction in February 1927. The next month, they convened to discuss the cost estimates for the parkway, which was projected to cost $3.5 million. The Board of Estimate voted to adopt the cost breakdown that Tuttle had proposed, and it recommended that land condemnation begin before the end of the year. In July 1927, New York Supreme Court justice James Church Cropsey authorized the city government to begin acquiring land for the Interborough Parkway. Work was delayed further because the city government had to prepare a "damage map", indicating how much compensation each landowner should receive; this map was finished in late 1927. The Board of Estimate approved a routing for the Interborough Parkway in January 1928, though local rabbis continued to object to the parkway's routing through the Cemetery Belt. The last step required before the parkway's construction could start, an agreement over a sewer line near Cypress Hills Cemetery, was approved that April.

==== Land condemnation and further delays ====
In June 1928, the damage maps for the parkway were forwarded to the city's corporation counsel, which in turn petitioned the New York Supreme Court for permission to begin acquiring the land. The city government was authorized to condemn the land the next month, and officials published notices about the condemnation proceedings in The City Record. City officials were supposed to have obtained title to the right-of-way no later than September 15, and the city government acquired the land that month. However, the start of work was subsequently delayed to mid-1929 while the city determined how to route the parkway through the cemeteries, as well as miscommunications about the construction of a storm sewer under the parkway. The section between Cypress Hills Street and Forest Park was also delayed while the city government and Cypress Hills Cemetery's trustees resolved some legal issues over the routing. The Board of Estimate approved $774,000 for preliminary work along the parkway's right-of-way in October 1928, and the Queens park commissioner requested $289,000 for the parkway's Forest Park section the following January. A proposed state law, which would have implemented a gas tax to pay for the parkway's construction, was unsuccessful.

The city government approved plans for sewers on the right-of-way in March 1929, and Queens borough president George U. Harvey requested that July that the Board of Estimate authorize the grading of the parkway's right-of-way. At the time, the board was still awaiting a final report from Tuttle. Another public hearing had to be hosted for the parkway after Tuttle determined that the work would cost $89,000 more than originally predicted. An overpass between the cemeteries had also been added to the plans, which required public review as well. In October 1929, the Board of Estimate approved the specifications for the parkway, which called for two 30-foot-wide (9.1 m) roadways, separated by a 18-foot-wide (5.5 m) median. City officials submitted a revised agreement on the proposed disinterments of bodies to Mount Carmel and Cypress Hills cemeteries' officials the next month.

After cemetery officials agreed to the changes, the Board of Estimate approved final plans in June 1930, and a state judge authorized the disinterment of corpses within the cemeteries. The city ultimately paid Cypress Hills Cemetery $1.5 million for land. The Brooklyn Chamber of Commerce requested that Mayor Jimmy Walker expedite the parkway's construction. Work had still not started by October because the bodies had to be removed from the cemeteries before any work on the parkway could begin. Though the state government tentatively offered to pay for the Interboro Parkway's construction if the right-of-way was increased to 190 feet (58 m), the city government declined the offer, especially since it would have required further land condemnation. As mapped out, the parkway's western end was at Highland Park, while its eastern end was at Union Turnpike; a connection between Eastern and Interboro parkways was made via Bushwick Avenue and Highland Boulevard. City officials anticipated that the parkway would help relieve congestion on Queens Boulevard and Hillside Avenue in conjunction with the Grand Central Parkway, which was to run from the Interboro's eastern end toward Nassau County, New York.

== Construction ==
=== Central section ===
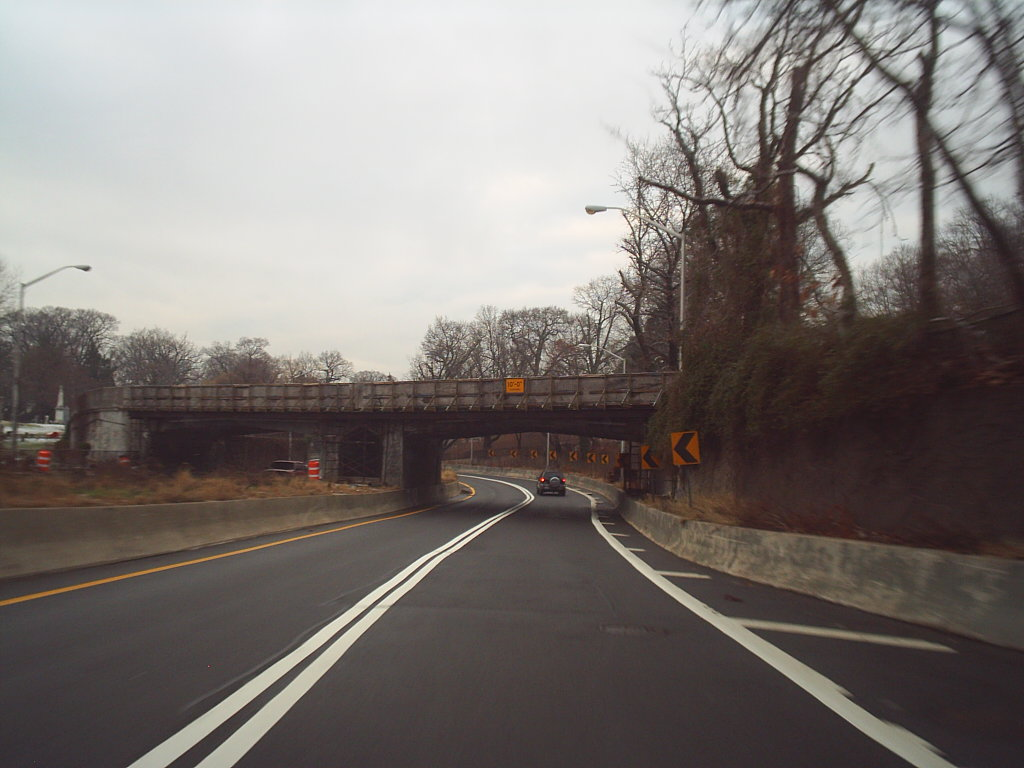
Curved section of the parkway. There are double-white lines between the two lanes, indicating that drivers are prohibited from changing lanes in this section.

In March 1931, Harvey began reviewing bids for the parkway's construction. The Welsh Brothers Construction Company submitted the lowest bid for grading the Interboro Parkway's right-of-way. Work on the parkway itself began April 6, 1931, after 365 corpses had been relocated. The first part of the parkway to be constructed was the central section through Cypress Hills and Mount Carmel cemeteries, which was the hardest to construct. By mid-1931, one of the three overpasses over the parkway's central section had been completed, having been built in one day, and grading of the parkway's central section was half-finished. The Brooklyn borough president's office had also received permission to begin grading the parkway's western section. Other aspects of the project were delayed by rainy weather and unusually muddy soil. Excavation and concrete work for the central section was nearly finished by October. The central section, costing $463,000, was mostly completed that December, five months ahead of schedule. However, the parkway remained closed because it was not paved and because its eastern terminus was a dead end.

A temporary 250-foot-long (76 m) road was constructed to connect the central section's eastern terminus with Forest Park Drive starting in January 1932. Workers leveled a hill in Forest Park, infilled a hollow, and built the road atop the hollow. The same month, the city government awarded a contract for the construction of a pumping plant on the Interboro Parkway to prevent the road from flooding. By March, the temporary road was nearly complete. In addition, the Queens borough president's office had solicited bids for the construction of concrete barriers along the parkway, and the New York Supreme Court had begun compensating burial-plot owners whose land had been seized for the parkway's construction. The central section was still unpaved by that June, and it remained unopened even in 1933.

=== Delays ===
Meanwhile, the Board of Estimate allocated $27,000 for surveys and maps of the parkway's right-of-way in November 1931. The same month, Queens park commissioner Albert C. Benninger requested $288,000 to grade the parkway's eastern section; though Benninger claimed that the city had failed to approve the funding request for several months, Walker said he had not been aware of the request. There were also plans to widen and pave part of Union Turnpike to provide a direct connection between Interboro and Grand Central parkways, and the city was acquiring a 140-foot-wide (43 m) strip of land from Queens Boulevard to Austin Street for that purpose. The connector included an underpass carrying the parkway under Queens Boulevard, which measured 80 feet (24 m) wide and was built by New York City Subway contractors. The Queens borough president's office was to oversee the construction of the eastern section within Forest Park, which was to cost an estimated $500,000. An overpass and two pedestrian underpasses would be built, and Forest Park's golf course was to be reconfigured. Engineers also wanted to build the western section near Ridgewood Reservoir by December 1931, but they had to wait for the city's water department to relocate water mains.

By May 1932, there were plans to extend the parkway from Highland Boulevard to Bushwick Avenue. One option called for the parkway to extend southwest to Pennsylvania Avenue, while another option would bring the parkway in a more westerly direction toward Eastern Parkway. Plans for the Interboro Parkway and two others in New York state were modified in July 1932 because they had gone over budget. That December, the Board of Estimate's chief engineer published a report estimating that it would cost $2 million to complete the Interboro Parkway, though the board deferred a decision on the report following opposition from Manhattan's and Staten Island's borough presidents. At the time, the plans called for an additional 11 bridges and 5 pedestrian overpasses along the parkway. The project was further delayed by opposition from the city's controller.

When John P. O'Brien was inaugurated as the city's new mayor at the beginning of 1933, civic groups asked him to approve the plans, but he also moved to delay the parkway's completion, citing a lack of money. Work on the Queens Boulevard underpass had also stalled due to a lack of money. That May, the Board of Estimate approved the acquisition of land for the parkway after Long Island State Park Commission (LISPC) chairman Robert Moses asked the board to reconsider the plans. As part of the board's approval, the LISPC agreed to hire only contractors from New York state, and it had to employ laborers from the city. The Board of Estimate also modified the parkway's funding breakdown so that the city government would pay 48% of the cost, Brooklyn would pay 35%, Queens would pay 15%, and Cypress Hills and Mount Carmel cemeteries would pay 1.5% each. The same month, the board approved the New York State Department of Public Works' plans to construct the rest of the parkway. The state and U.S. federal governments promised to allocate $4.7 million for the completion of the Interborough and Laurelton parkways if the city government acquired title to the land.

=== Resumption of work ===
After the Board of Estimate approved the parkway's completion through Forest Park, 400 people were hired to clear the right-of-way, and two beer gardens there had to be demolished for the parkway. A 200-year-old homestead at the parkway's eastern end also had to be demolished. In June 1933, the board voted to approve the damage maps for the parkway's eastern section. The board also voted to acquire two strips of land along the parkway's eastern section, as the project could not receive federal and state funding if the city did not take title to the land. In addition, Queens officials asked the city government to repair streets that connected with the parkway, and workers subsequently repaved one of these streets, Cypress Avenue. To prevent congestion on Cypress Avenue, the Brooklyn–Manhattan Transit Corporation proposed replacing the streetcars on that avenue with buses.

After the city had formally acquired the parkway's route, it formally began soliciting bids for the construction of bridges on the parkway. The first contract for the eastern section was awarded in August 1933, when contractors began constructing three bridges to carry local traffic across the Interboro Parkway. This contract had to be completed within two months but was delayed due to inclement weather. The Board of Estimate reviewed and approved contracts for three additional segments of the Interboro Parkway's eastern section, between Woodhaven Boulevard and Metropolitan Avenue, that September. By November, contracts for 11 bridges along the Interboro Parkway's eastern section were being awarded; further contracts for bridges along the parkway were awarded the next month. In addition to the construction of bridges, the project required relocating utilities, rerouting Union Turnpike's eastbound lanes, and constructing a water-pumping station. Several houses along the right-of-way had to be cut back or even demolished entirely.

During the parkway's construction, several landowners claimed that workers were damaging their lawns. Residents and merchants in central Queens also complained that the project was disrupting businesses and causing hazardous conditions for pedestrians, prompting construction contractors to expedite the parkway's completion. Work on the eastern section was delayed in late 1933 and early 1934 due to snowy weather.

=== Western extension and completion ===
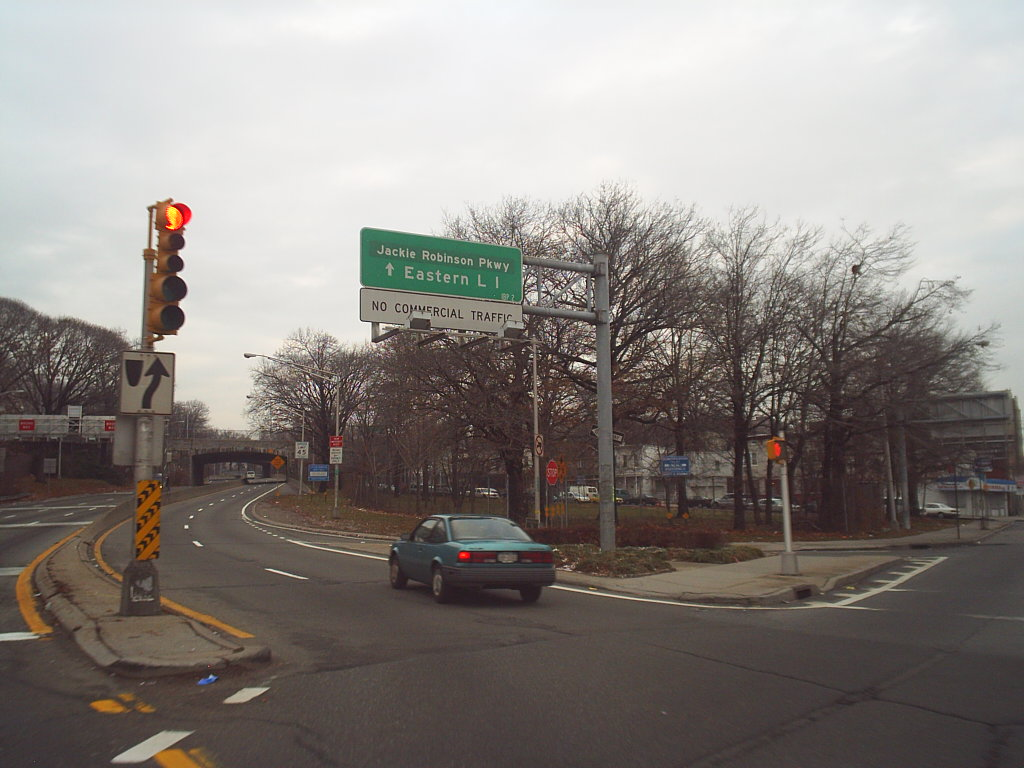
The western terminus of the parkway at Bushwick, Pennsylvania, and Jamaica avenues

Moses announced in December 1933 that the parkway was to be extended further west from Highland Boulevard to Bushwick Avenue. Under this plan, an additional mile of road was to be constructed, requiring the condemnation of 7.5 acres (3.0 ha) in the Cemetery of the Evergreens. Because the parkway would replace an existing roadway, this tract of land did not require disinterments, as had been the case with Cypress Hills and Mount Carmel cemeteries. State engineers rejected a proposal to construct a tunnel under the parkway, which would have avoided the need to disturb the cemetery. The LISPC also received bids for four bridges along the parkway's route in January 1934. The state legislature passed a law the next month, allowing the Cemetery of the Evergreens to transfer ownership of land for the parkway's right-of-way. Though Governor Herbert H. Lehman signed the bill, the Board of Estimate initially failed to approve the acquisition of the land because Manhattan borough president Samuel Levy opposed it. In addition, Moses initially claimed that local streets could adequately handle traffic to and from the parkway. The board finally agreed to buy the land in March 1934, over Levy's continued objections. The Cemetery of the Evergreens received $245,000 for its land.

During the Interboro Parkway's construction, temporary roadways were built to carry Vermont Avenue, Cypress Hills Street, Woodhaven Boulevard, Myrtle Avenue, and Metropolitan Avenue across the parkway. The LISPC began receiving bids for the construction of a bridge above the parkway at Myrtle Avenue, as well as the replacement of a superintendent's house at Ridgewood Reservoir, in March 1934. Shortly afterward, State Supreme Court justice Charles C. Lockwood ruled that the city government was to give $1,756,599 in compensation to 170 landowners; this was less than half the $4 million that the landowners had requested. The city government also issued corporate stock to pay for the acquisition of land for the Interboro Parkway. Progress on the rest of the parkway was stalled by inclement weather, but several contracts for the eastern section were being completed by mid-1934, including bridges at Metropolitan Avenue and Woodhaven Boulevard. Moses presented plans for an entrance plaza at the intersection of Bushwick, Pennsylvania, and Jamaica avenues, where the parkway's western terminus was to be located, in June 1934. The Board of Estimate approved plans for the parkway's westward extension that month.

Cypress Hills Cemetery gave the Long Island State Park Commission an easement in mid-1934, allowing the commission to remove retaining walls and landscape the land next to the parkway. That September, the state's Department of Public Works solicited bids for the paving of parts of the parkway, as well as the removal of the Cypress Hills Cemetery retaining walls. The next month, the Board of Estimate voted to ban commercial buildings from being built within 100 feet (30 m) of the parkway. In addition, the department awarded contracts for bridge-construction and land grading west of Vermont Avenue, and the construction of the western entrance plaza, that December. Workers began razing buildings for the parkway's extension that month. Ten of the twenty-one bridges on the parkway's route had been finished by late 1934.

Initial plans called for the section east of Metropolitan Avenue to open to traffic by early 1935, but the paving of this section was delayed due to poor weather. By that March, the opening of the section east of Metropolitan Avenue had been delayed to that summer, while the rest of the parkway was delayed until later that year. In addition, the site of the western entrance plaza was nearly fully cleared. Construction of the parkway's final bridge, at Highland Boulevard, began in April 1935 after that bridge had been redesigned. The easternmost section was slated to open to traffic first; the western entrance plaza would be the last section of the parkway to be completed. The paving and landscaping of the parkway's Cypress Hills Cemetery section was substantially completed by that May, and the section west of Vermont Avenue was being graded by the next month. In addition, the city government allocated funds for a drainage sewer near the parkway.

== Operation ==
=== 1930s to 1950s ===
The Interboro Parkway opened to traffic in July 1935, several months behind schedule. However, it remained unfinished until the completion of the Highland Boulevard-Bushwick Avenue extension in September 1935. The same month, the state government began soliciting bids for the paving of the parkway. A formal dedication ceremony for the parkway took place on November 12, 1935, at the Highland Boulevard overpass; a special exhibit about the parkway was displayed at the Brooklyn Automobile Show to celebrate the opening. The project's final cost was $3.3 million. The parkway's construction was credited with influencing people to move from Brooklyn to Forest Hills and Kew Gardens, Queens.

Issues with the parkway designed plagued its usefulness, as declared by the New York City Planning Department in 1941. One issue was the presence of "bad curves" at two sections of the parkway. These curves, as viewed by the department, were a "serious hazard" to drivers, but rectifying the problem would prove difficult due to the parkway's location through cemeteries. Furthermore, the department criticized a lack of highway connections at the parkway's western terminus in Brooklyn. The department suggested that the proposed Cross Brooklyn Express Highway would connect to the Interboro Parkway, rectifying this problem. However, the proposed Cross Brooklyn Express Highway was never constructed as it was canceled by mayor John Lindsay in 1969.

=== 1960s and 1970s ===
An extension to Jamaica Bay was proposed in 1963. This extension, proposed by Robert Moses, would run 3.4 miles through southern Brooklyn, specifically East New York, New Lots and Starrett City. Pennsylvania Avenue was presumed to serve as a service road for the extended parkway. Construction cost was estimated at $30 million and scheduled for completion in 1976. However, the extension was cancelled in the late 1960s.

On September 12, 1972, Transportation Administrator Constantine Sidamon-Eristoff announced that the New York City Board of Estimate approved a contract for the design of a $1,472,000 project to improve safety on the dangerous 3,700 feet (1,100 m)-long curved section of the roadway between Cypress Hills Street and Forest Park Drive. Work was expected to begin in summer 1973. The project would realign the roadway where possible to ease S-curves, resurface pavement, install water-filled plastic buffers at accident-prone locations, create spaces along the road for disabled vehicles, and replace 16-inch high barriers in the median of the roadway with three-foot tall concrete barriers. Engineers would also look into the feasibility of widening the roadway, though the retaining walls for cemeteries abutting both sides of the S-curve section posed a challenge to doing so.

The city was also in the process of applying for federal funds for an overall project to modernize the roadway along its entire length, which was expected to cost between $60 million and $75 million. Additional safety hazards on the roadway included many small-radius curves, inadequate median separation barriers, and exits and entrances without acceleration or deceleration lanes. Simon-Eristoff also said that he wanted the roadway to be incorporated into either the federal highway or state arterial systems, which would require state legislation. This legislation was proposed and signed into law by Governor Malcolm Wilson in May 1973.

On November 4, 1974, the parkway was closed as work began on reconstruction of a 4,100 feet (1,200 m) section of the highway between Cypress Hills Street and Forest Park Drive, where at least ten people were killed and many more were injured in this section over the previous five years. The one-year $1.7 million project would install a reinforced center divider, smooth out asphalt, and bank the S-curves of the roadway. Water-filled plastic containers would be placed at the dangerous westbound exit to Cypress Hills Street to lessen the impact of crashes, and four parking spots would be completed along the roadway with police telephones for stranded drivers. State and city officials estimated it would cost over $70 million to make the entire parkway safe.

Part of the original parkway contract included the construction of a pair of service stations just west of exit 6 (Metropolitan Avenue) in Forest Park. The stone-faced gas stations, which were located along the eastbound and westbound lanes of the parkway, were torn down in the late 1970s.

=== 1980s to present ===
The New York State Department of Transportation began reconstructing parts of the parkway in 1987. Ramps along the parkway were rebuilt, converting the junction with Metropolitan Avenue at Exit 6 from a tight cloverleaf interchange to a four-ramp diamond interchange. The road was rebuilt as well, installing a concrete median and new lighting along the route. Speed limits were decreased at the swerving curve at the Cypress Hills Cemetery and at the curve beneath the Queens Boulevard underpass, problem spots noted earlier in the 1941 report by the New York City Planning Department. The project cost $43.1 million and took place between 1989 and 1991.

In April 1997, mayor Rudy Giuliani announced that the parkway would be renamed in honor of the Brooklyn Dodgers player Jackie Robinson, who had broken the baseball color line fifty years prior. In addition to playing for the Dodgers, Robinson resided and owned property in the area along the parkway, and his gravesite is located in Cypress Hills Cemetery. State assemblyman Jeffrion L. Aubry sponsored legislation to rename the parkway, and Giuliani and governor George Pataki signed the legislation later that month. However, some street maps, such as the New York City Taxi and Limousine Commission's official map, bore the older name for several years.

In early 2018, the New York City Department of Transportation installed new black-on-white route designation signs on the Jackie Robinson Parkway as part of a program to replace route-designation signs across New York City's parkways. The signs contain an image of Robinson at bat, wearing a jersey with the number 42. Twenty-five signs were installed, replacing the old white-on-green signs.

== Exit list ==
Borough	Location	mi	km	Exit	Destinations	Notes
Brooklyn	East New York	0.00	0.00	–	Pennsylvania Avenue / East New York Avenue	Western terminus; at-grade intersection
Brooklyn	East New York	0.30	0.48	1	Bushwick Avenue	Westbound exit and eastbound entrance
Queens	Highland Park	0.90	1.45	2	Cypress Avenue / Vermont Place	
Queens	Glendale	1.42	2.29	3	Cypress Hills Street	No westbound entrance
Queens	Glendale	2.10– 2.50	3.38– 4.02	4	Forest Park Drive	Signed as Forest Park Drive / Myrtle Avenue / Woodhaven Boulevard westbound
Queens	Glendale	2.80	4.51	5	Myrtle Avenue / Woodhaven Boulevard	No westbound exit
Queens	Forest Hills–Kew Gardens line	4.02	6.47	6	Metropolitan Avenue / Queens Boulevard	Signed as Metropolitan Avenue westbound
Queens	Forest Hills–Kew Gardens line	4.95	7.97	7	I-678 north (Van Wyck Expressway) – Whitestone Bridge	Eastbound exit and westbound entrance; exit 7 on I-678
Queens	Forest Hills–Kew Gardens line	5.10	8.21	8W	Grand Central Parkway west – RFK Bridge, LaGuardia Airport	Eastbound exit and westbound entrance; exit 14 on Grand Central Parkway
Queens	Forest Hills–Kew Gardens line	5.40	8.69	8E	Grand Central Parkway east – Eastern Long Island	Eastern terminus
1.000 mi = 1.609 km; 1.000 km = 0.621 mi: Incomplete access

== See also ==
- Transportation in New York City
