= Kew Gardens Interchange =

Highway interchange in Kew Gardens, Queens, New York

- The Maze; The Pretzel
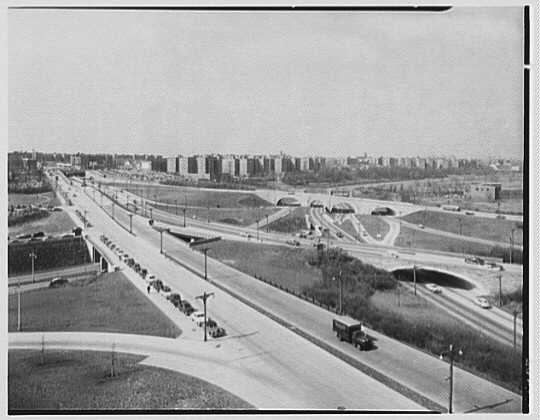
- The interchange in 1955
- Interactive map of Kew Gardens Interchange

Location
- Kew Gardens, Queens, New York
- Coordinates: 40°42′59″N 73°49′34″W
- Roads at junction: I-678; NY 25; Grand Central Parkway; Jackie Robinson Parkway; Union Turnpike

Construction
- Type: Interchange
- Opened: 1930s
- Maintained by: NYCDOT and NYSDOT

The Kew Gardens Interchange (also known as The Pretzel and The Maze) is a complex interchange between the neighborhoods of Kew Gardens, Kew Gardens Hills and Briarwood and Flushing Meadows-Corona Park in the center of the New York City borough of Queens serving nearly 600,000 vehicles daily.

== Description ==
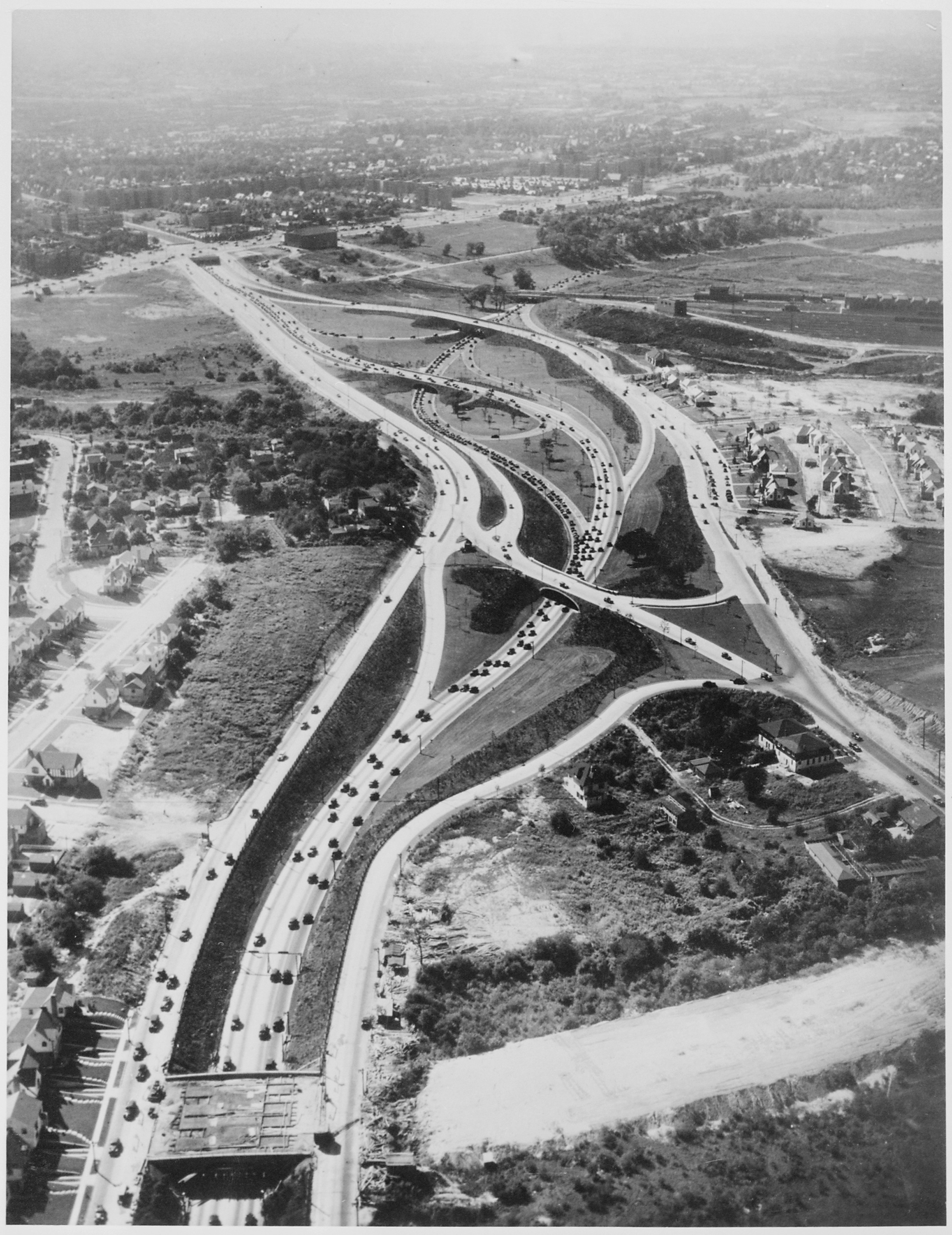
The interchange in 1936

The Kew Gardens Interchange is located roughly midway between LaGuardia Airport and John F. Kennedy International Airport. Highways feeding into the Kew Gardens Interchange include the Grand Central Parkway, Interstate 678 (the Van Wyck Expressway), the Jackie Robinson Parkway, Queens Boulevard (New York State Route 25), and Union Turnpike. Its complex design has led to it gaining the nicknames of "The Pretzel" and "The Maze".

The Kew Gardens Interchange is an incomplete junction. The Grand Central Parkway connects to and from the Jackie Robinson Parkway in both directions, but access to I-678 south is only served by eastbound exit and westbound entrance ramps. The Jackie Robinson Parkway, which terminates at this interchange, connects to both directions of the Grand Central Parkway, but only serves I-678 north. The northbound lanes of the Van Wyck Expressway (I-678) only serve the westbound Grand Central Parkway, while the southbound lanes only serve the Jackie Robinson Parkway.

All directions of the limited access highways provide access to Union Turnpike, which also intersects to Queens Boulevard (NY 25) to the west and Main Street to the east. Missing movements in the highway interchange can be made via these local roads, as well as the Long Island Expressway (I-495), located approximately 2 miles (3.2 km) north of the interchange.

=== Missing connections ===
Missing connection	Connected by
Grand Central Parkway east to I-678 north	NY 25A / Northern Boulevard, located 4 miles (6.4 km) north (G.C. Parkway exit 9E, I-678 exit 13)
I-678 south to Grand Central Parkway	NY 25A / Northern Boulevard, located 4 miles (6.4 km) north (G.C. Parkway exit 9E, I-678 exit 13)
Jackie Robinson Parkway east to I-678 south	Metropolitan Avenue, Union Turnpike, and Queens Boulevard (J.R. Parkway exit 6, I-678 exit 9)
I-678 north to Jackie Robinson Parkway west	Metropolitan Avenue, Union Turnpike, and Queens Boulevard (J.R. Parkway exit 6, I-678 exit 9)
Grand Central Parkway west to I-678 south	G.C. Parkway frontage roads, Main Street (G.C. Parkway exit 17, I-678 exit 8)
I-678 north to Grand Central Parkway east	G.C. Parkway frontage roads, Main Street (G.C. Parkway exit 17, I-678 exit 8)

== History ==
A distorted trumpet between Grand Central Parkway and Jackie Robinson Parkway (Interboro Parkway), with Union Turnpike appearing somewhat as a service road, was constructed in the 1930s. Connections to the Van Wyck Expressway were added later.

On August 18, 2010, the New York State Department of Transportation broke ground on the first phase of reconstruction of the Kew Gardens interchange. The renovation project includes the renovations of the nearby Queens Boulevard viaduct over I-678 and the New York City Subway's nearby Briarwood station (E, F, and <F> trains). Renovations to the Queens Boulevard viaduct and Briarwood station were completed in 2016 at a cost of $159 million. The project included a reconstructed exit ramp, widened lanes on I-678, and four new bridges. The second phase included constructing a new viaduct and a new flyover ramp for the northbound I-678, as well as new decks and steel girders for some of the other viaducts. The third and fourth phases included the reconstruction of additional ramps and the widening of the roadways. All work was completed in 2022 at a cost of $739 million.
