= Queens Boulevard =

Boulevard in Queens, New York

- New York State Route 25
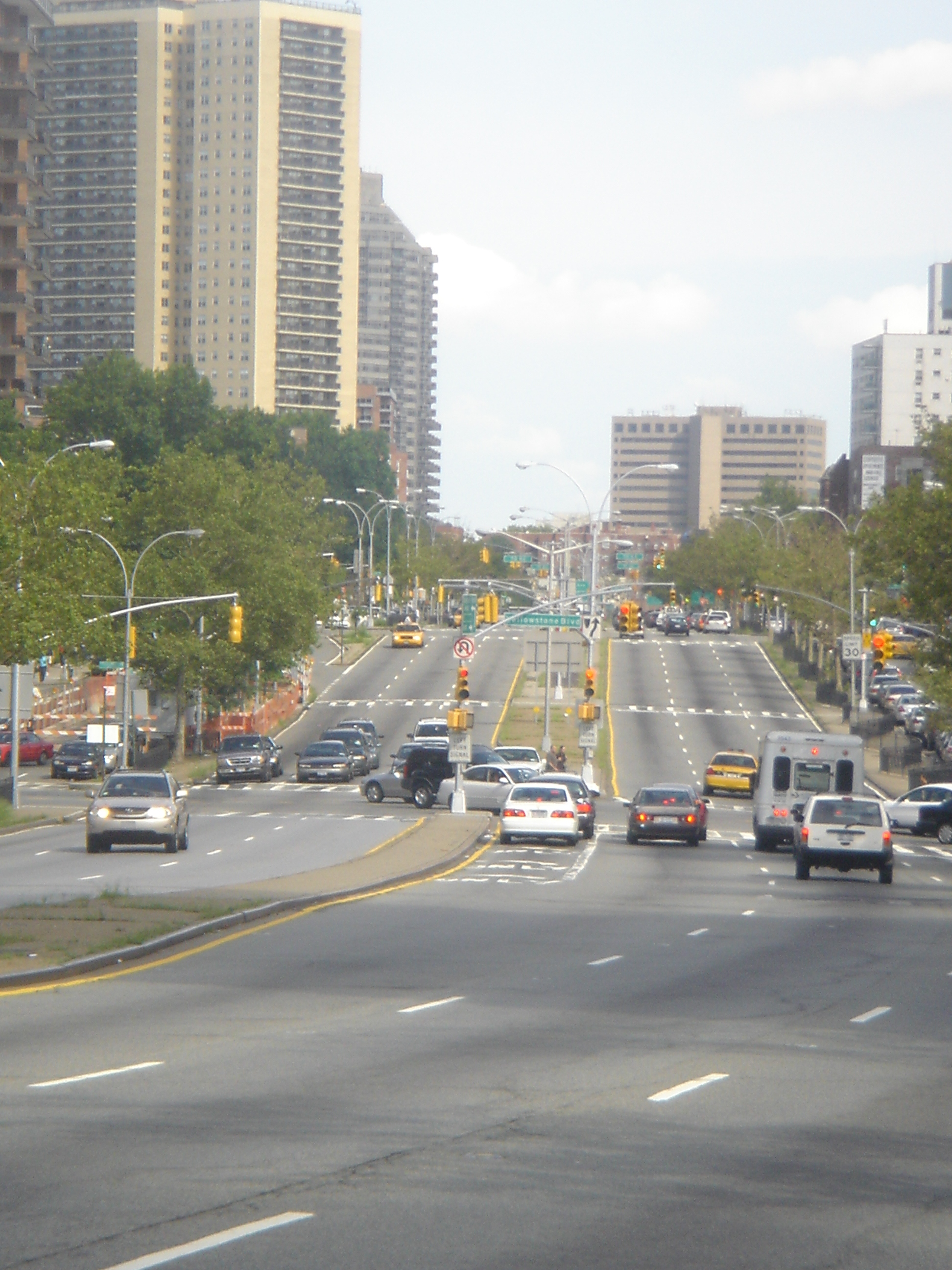
- Queens Boulevard near its intersection with Yellowstone Boulevard in Forest Hills
- Part of: NY 25
- Owner: City of New York
- Maintained by: NYCDOT
- Length: 7.5 mi (12.1 km)
- Width: 80 to 200 feet (24 to 61 m)
- Location: Queens, New York City, U.S.
- West end: NY 25 (Queensboro Bridge) / NY 25A (Jackson Avenue / Northern Boulevard) in Long Island City
- Major junctions: I-278 in Woodside; I-495 / Woodhaven Boulevard in Elmhurst; I-678 / Grand Central Parkway / Jackie Robinson Parkway / Union Turnpike at Kew Gardens Interchange; I-678 / Main Street in Briarwood; NY 25 (Hillside Avenue) in Jamaica
- East end: Jamaica Avenue in Jamaica

Queens Boulevard is a major thoroughfare connecting Midtown Manhattan, via the Queensboro Bridge, to Jamaica in Queens, New York City, United States. It is 7.5 miles (12.1 km) long and forms part of New York State Route 25.

Queens Boulevard runs northwest to southeast from Queens Plaza at the Queensboro Bridge entrance in Long Island City. It runs through the neighborhoods of Sunnyside, Woodside, Elmhurst, Rego Park, Forest Hills, Kew Gardens, and Briarwood before terminating at Jamaica Avenue in Jamaica. The boulevard is 200 feet (61 m) wide for much of its length, with shorter sections between 80 and 150 feet (24 and 46 m) wide. Its immense width, heavy automobile traffic, and thriving commercial scene has historically made it one of the most dangerous thoroughfares in New York City, with pedestrian crossings up to 300 feet (91 m) long at some places.

The route of today's Queens Boulevard originally consisted of Hoffman Boulevard and Thompson Avenue, which was created by linking and expanding these already-existing streets, stubs of which still exist. In 1913, a trolley line was constructed from 59th Street in Manhattan east along the new boulevard. During the 1920s and 1930s the boulevard was widened in conjunction with the digging of the IND Queens Boulevard Line subway tunnels. In 1941, the New York City Planning Department proposed converting Queens Boulevard into a freeway, which ultimately never occurred.

== Route description ==
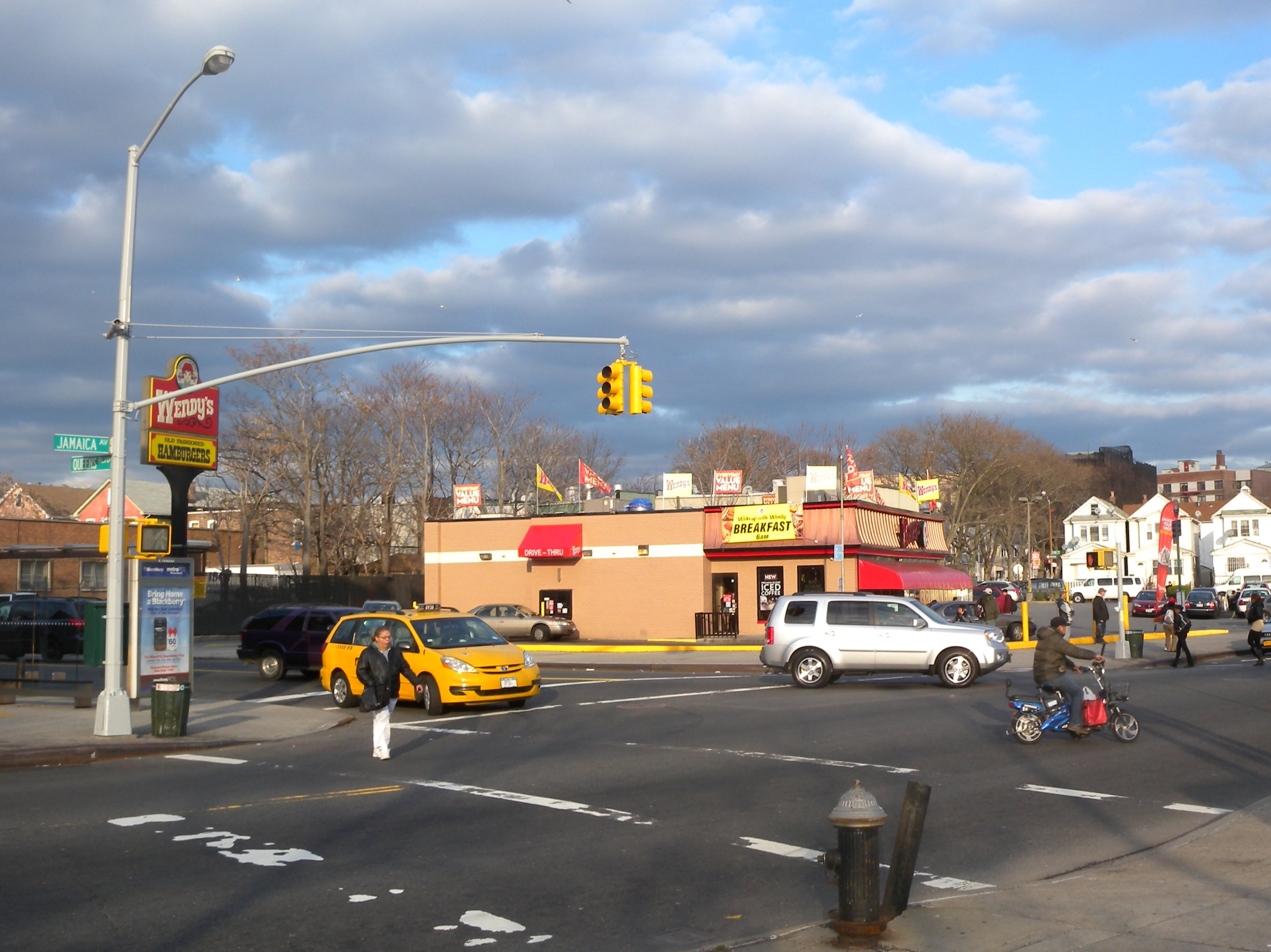
Queens Boulevard starts off as a small 2-lane street at Jamaica Avenue, but becomes a 6 lane median-divided street at Hillside Avenue one block north.

Queens Boulevard runs northwest to southeast across a little short of half the length of the borough, starting at Queens Plaza at the Queensboro Bridge entrance in Long Island City and running through the neighborhoods of Sunnyside, Woodside, Elmhurst, Rego Park, Forest Hills, Kew Gardens, and Briarwood before terminating at Jamaica Avenue in Jamaica. At 7.5 miles (12.1 km), it is one of the longest roads in Queens, and it runs through some of Queens' busiest areas. Queens Boulevard is the starting point of many other major streets in Queens, such as Northern Boulevard, Woodhaven Boulevard, Junction Boulevard, Roosevelt Avenue, and Main Street.

Queens Boulevard has a width of 100 feet (30 m) from Queens Plaza to Van Dam Street, 200 feet (61 m) from Van Dam Street to Union Turnpike, 150 feet (46 m) from Union Turnpike to Hillside Avenue, and 80 feet (24 m) from Hillside Avenue to Jamaica Avenue. Much of the road has 12 lanes, and at its intersection with Yellowstone Boulevard in Forest Hills, it reaches a high point of 16 lanes.

Along much of its length (between Roosevelt Avenue and Union Turnpike), the road includes six express lanes (three in each direction) and a three-lane-wide service road on each side. Drivers must first exit to the service road to make right turns or pull over. Left turns must be made from the express lanes, but only at select cross-streets. The express lanes use a 60-foot-wide (18 m) underpass (separated by a median) to bypass Woodhaven Boulevard and Horace Harding Expressway; the service roads provide access to both streets.

Due to the high number of crashes, Queens Boulevard is known as the Boulevard of Death. More crashes happen along Queens Boulevard than any other roadway statewide.

== History ==
=== Early history ===
Queens Boulevard was planned as a nearly 10-mile (16 km) road from the Queensboro Bridge Plaza to Jamaica, mostly 200 feet (61 m) wide and formed partly by widening Thomson Avenue. By mid-1913, condemnation was proceeding quickly, with costs split among the city (50%), the borough (30%), and local property owners (20%). The route of today's Queens Boulevard originally consisted of Hoffman Boulevard and Thompson Avenue, which was created by linking and expanding these already-existing streets, stubs of which still exist. A remnant of the old Hoffman Boulevard can be found in Forest Hills where the local lanes of traffic diverge into two routes, one straight and one that bends around MacDonald Park. The part that bends around the park was the original route of Hoffman Boulevard. The street was built in the early 20th century to connect the new Queensboro Bridge to central Queens, thereby offering an easy outlet from Manhattan. The New York Times called Queens Boulevard "a gateway to Long Island, for it is only by this route that the automobilist may reach the entire south shore."

In 1913, a trolley line was constructed from 59th Street in Manhattan east along the new boulevard.

=== 1930s–1950s: widening and subway construction ===
During the 1920s and 1930s the boulevard was widened in conjunction with the digging of the IND Queens Boulevard Line subway tunnels. The new subway line used cut-and-cover construction and trenches had to be dug up in the center of the thoroughfare, and to allow pedestrians to pass over the construction, temporary bridges were built. The improvement was between Van Dam Street and Hillside Avenue, and it cost $2.23 million. The street was widened to 200 feet (61 m) between Van Dam Street and Union Turnpike, and from there to Hillside Avenue it was widened to 150 feet (46 m). As part of the project, there was to have been separated rights-of-way for the trolley line.

On May 2, 1936, Queens Borough President George U. Harvey cut the ribbon for the opening of the center roadway of the Boulevard at Seminole Avenue in Forest Hills. This widened section allowed drivers to access the Grand Central Parkway. This work was partially funded with aid from the Works Progress Administration. $1,555,000 was initially allotted to this project. On April 17, 1937, trolley service along Queens Boulevard ended, being replaced by bus service.

In the late 1930s, NY 25 was aligned to follow Queens Boulevard (NY 24) from Skillman Avenue to Horace Harding Boulevard, where NY 25 turned eastward to follow Horace Harding Boulevard back to its original alignment at Corona Avenue.

In 1941, the New York City Planning Department proposed converting Queens Boulevard into a freeway, as was done with the Van Wyck Expressway, from the Queensboro Bridge to Hillside Avenue. The boulevard would be converted to an expressway with grade separation at the more important intersections, and by closing off access from minor streets. As part of the project, the express lanes of Queens Boulevard were depressed in the area of Woodhaven Boulevard and Horace Harding Boulevard (later turned into the Long Island Expressway), while the local lanes were kept at grade level. The plan to upgrade the boulevard was delayed with the onset of World War II, and was never completed.

in the early 1940s, New York State Route 25 was altered to follow Queens Boulevard entirely.

On November 18, 1949, the Traffic Commission approved the retiming of traffic signals along the entire Boulevard to speed traffic, which would take effect about February 1, 1950. The change, known as the "triple-offset system" was expected to reduce peak congestion, like what was done on the Grand Concourse. Westbound traffic would be favored from 7 to 9 a.m., while eastbound traffic would be favored from 5 to 7 p.m.. The Boulevard handled 73,000 cars on an average weekday, with a peak of 7,600 cars an hour towards Manhattan, and a peak of 6,700 to points east.

=== 1960s–1970s ===
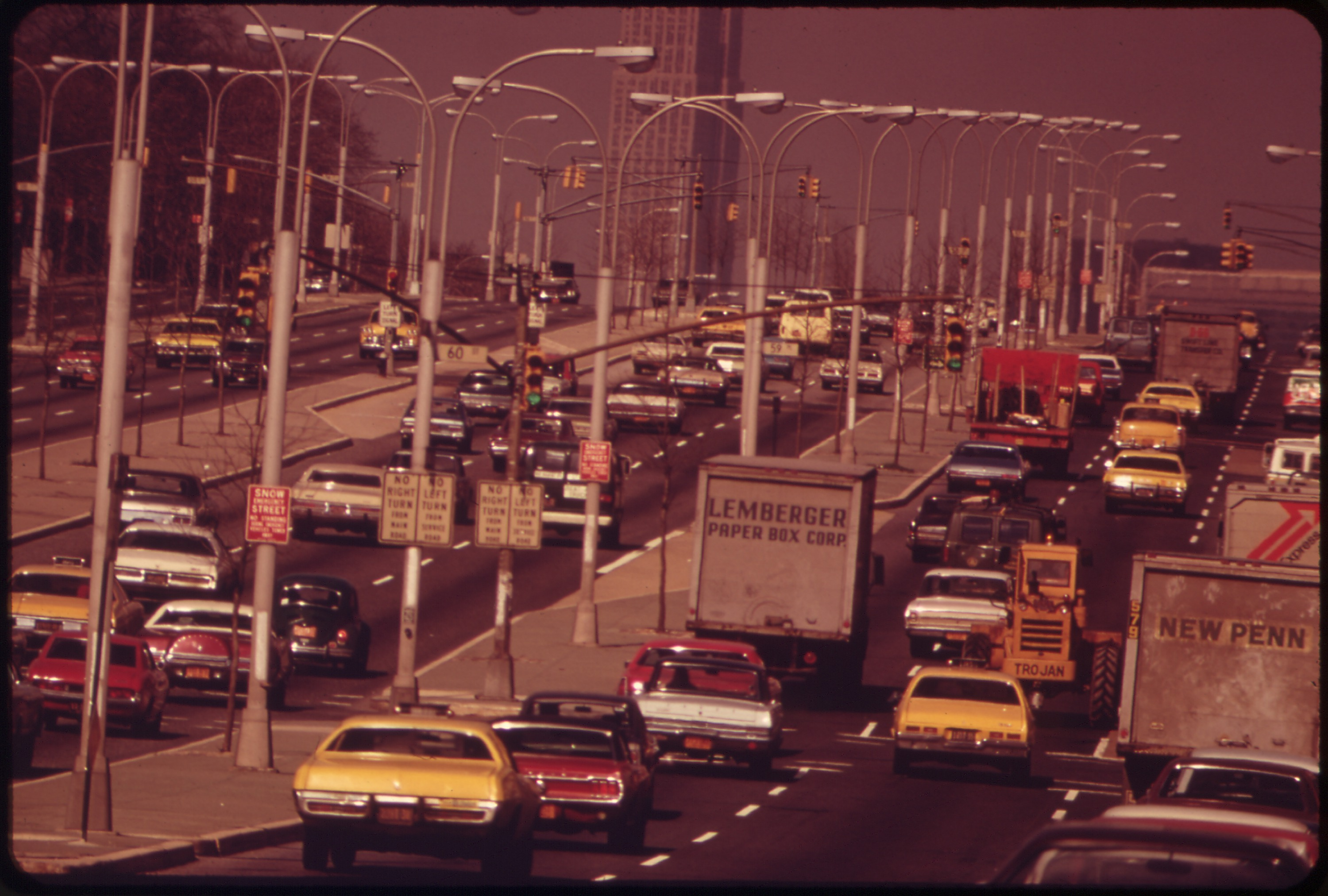
In Woodside, looking toward the East River and Manhattan, 1973

In 1960, Queens borough president John T. Clancy proposed reconstructing the entire seven-mile boulevard to meet traffic demand from the 1964 New York World's Fair for $17.1 million. Due to bureaucratic issues and the need to finance the project using city funds, the project was delayed and cut back to a 2.5 mile section for $2.6 million. Underpasses at Union Turnpike and at Grand Avenue—Broadway were dropped from the plan. On September 3, 1964, the Department of Highways announced that the project was far behind the project's original schedule. Only $2.6 million for the central section of the project was approved as rebuilding more than a mile of the road a time was deemed to be too disruptive for travel. At the time, the rebuilding of the first 1-mile section from 70th Avenue to Union Turnpike was completed. The six service road lanes were resurfaced, yellow asphalt surfacing was installed to guide drivers turning at intersections, and malls were narrowed to widen the roadway and provide space for cars turning off the six-lane main roadway. Work on the 63rd Drive to 70th Avenue section was 70 percent complete, and the Department of Highways expected to request the release of $400,000 for the section to Woodhaven Boulevard within two weeks. Work on that section was expected to start in 1965. Queens Boulevard handled more than 85,000 vehicles a day, making it the second busiest roadway in the city, after the Long Island Expressway, which handled 125,000 vehicles a day.

In 1969, many traffic lights on Queens and Northern Boulevards were computerized, reducing travel time by as much as 25 percent during off-peak hours, and as much as 39 percent during rush hour.

=== 1980s to 2000s ===
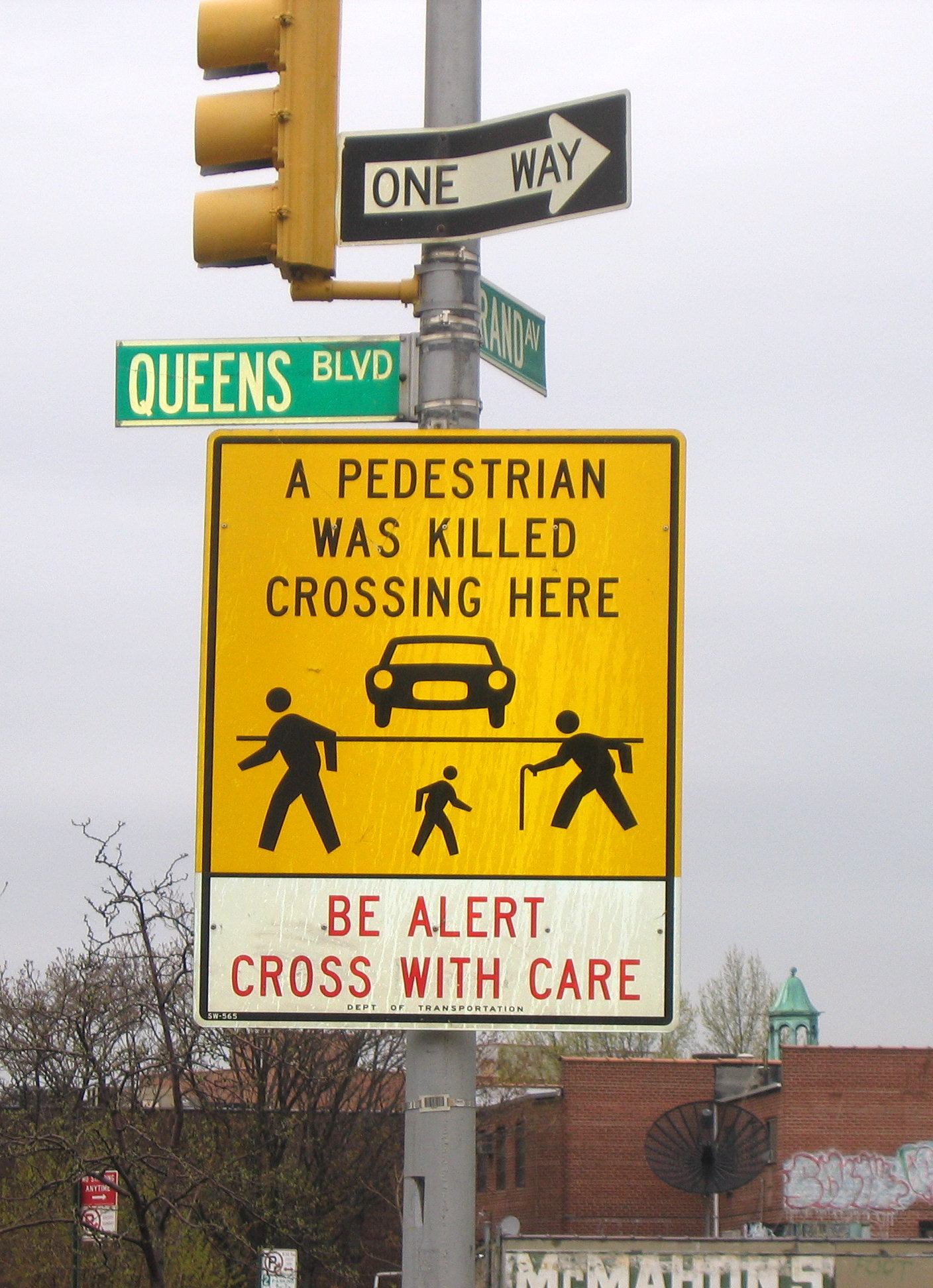
"A Pedestrian Was Killed Crossing Here" sign on Queens Boulevard at Grand Avenue in Elmhurst

In 1985, the New York City Department of Transportation (NYCDOT) started a project to examine the causes of fatalities and injuries on the boulevard. The changing of traffic signals to increase crossing times across the boulevard helped reduce the average pedestrian deaths in a section in Forest Hills and Rego Park from 4 each year from 1980 and 1984 to 1 in 1986. In four of the five years between 1988 and 1992, as many people were killed in car accidents on the boulevard as on any other street in the city. Between 1991 and 1992, new speed limit signs were installed on the boulevard, police enforcement of traffic light and speeding violations was increased, and the timing for street lights was adjusted.

In 1992, in a test lasting a month, one camera on the boulevard recorded over 1,000 red-light and speeding violations. In 1993, the NYCDOT planned on installing 15 video cameras across the city that spring, with at least one installed on Queens Boulevard, to monitor and report drivers who run red lights or speed. Summonses would be sent to the owner of the car observed making the traffic infractions. The DOT also planned on installing barriers in the center median separating eastbound and westbound traffic in a section of Forest Hills to discourage people from crossing the street outside of intersections. The DOT had studied installing pedestrian bridges over Queens Boulevard, in addition to Eastern Parkway and Grand Concourse, but had found that it would have been too expensive to do so.

In January 1997, the city commissioned a study of the 2.5 miles (4.0 km) of roadway between the Long Island Expressway and Union Turnpike. The study was completed by 1999, and most work was finished by July 2001. As part of the improvement process, the city installed new curb- and median-extensions along the corridor; repainted crosswalks so they were more visible; added fences in the medians; closed several "slips" that allowed vehicles to make high-speed turns; posted large signs proclaiming that "A Pedestrian Was Killed Crossing Here" at intersections where fatal accidents have occurred; and reduced the speed limit from 35 to 30 miles per hour (56 to 48 km/h); a few segments had 35 mph speed limits. Pedestrian signals were adjusted so that they were given 60 seconds to cross the boulevard, compared to 32–50 seconds before the improvements.

The street gained notoriety in 2001 as "the Boulevard of Death" due to multiple pedestrian fatalities. Due to an aggressive public safety campaign by the NYCDOT and engineering changes, deaths fell from 17 in 1993 and 18 in 1997 to 4 in 2001; nonfatal accidents were reduced from 2,937 in 1993 to 1,627 in 2001. New fences in the median led most pedestrians to use crosswalks. The number of camera on poles to catch drivers running red lights increase from four to two, and the NYCDOT planned to mount dozens of fake cameras to keep drivers guessing in 2002. The NYCDOT had resisted making the speed for the boulevard a uniform 30 mph for some time, arguing that it would reduce traffic flow. The NYPD said that a uniform limit would allow them to issue more speeding tickets.

In January 2001, in response to the street safety crisis on the Boulevard, the NYPD began a crackdown on jaywalking, and issued over 6,000 jaywalking summonses on the street, as of June 2001. In May 2001, the NYCDOT proposed eliminating a traffic lane in each direction between Kneeland Avenue and Union Turnpike to be used for metered parking to make the street safer. The arrangement was initially going to be piloted for eight months. Between 1993 and 2000, there were 72 pedestrian fatalities on the boulevard, with 24 in 1993 and 22 in 1997.

A second phase covering the rest of the boulevard was studied from November 2001 to July 2004, and improvements were finished by late 2006. These improvements decreased pedestrian accidents on the boulevard by 68%, most notably at large and dangerous intersections. In 2004, one pedestrian was killed crossing Queens Boulevard. On April 5, 2004, city officials announced new measures to improve safety on the boulevard. These included additional fences to deter jaywalking, modifications to improve traffic flow and safety, longer crossing times for pedestrians, and the elimination of U-turns and left turns in some locations.

=== 2010s to present: capital improvement ===
On August 18, 2010, the New York State Department of Transportation broke ground on the first phase of a reconstruction of the Kew Gardens Interchange, involved in the project was the renovation of a nearby viaduct carrying Queens Boulevard over the Van Wyck Expressway and the nearby Briarwood subway station (E, F, and <F> trains). In 2011, safety enhancements, including pedestrian countdown signals, were added. That year was the first year that no one was killed crossing the street since 1983, the year when detailed fatality records were first kept.

In 2014, the speed limit on Queens Boulevard was reduced further, from 30 mph to 25 mph (40 km/h). The speed limit decrease was part of de Blasio's Vision Zero program, which aimed to decrease pedestrian deaths citywide. From 2014 to 2016, average speeds of eastbound cars on Queens Boulevard declined from 28.7 to 25.6 miles per hour (46.2 to 41.2 km/h), and the speeds of westbound cars declined from 31.5 to 27.3 miles per hour (50.7 to 43.9 km/h).

In 2015, a new initiative was announced to further improve Queens Boulevard at a cost of $100 million. The section between Roosevelt Avenue and 73rd Street received safety improvements, including pedestrian zones and bike lanes, as part of improvement's Phase 1, which began in August 2015 and was finished by the end of the year. Phase 2 between 74th Street and Eliot Avenue began in summer 2016. Phase 3 was split into two projects: between Eliot Avenue and Yellowstone Boulevard, and between Yellowstone Boulevard and Union Turnpike. The segment of the Phase 3 overhaul between Eliot and Yellowstone started in May 2017, while the segment between Yellowstone and Union Turnpike would start in July 2018.

The project gained opposition from some of the community boards surrounding Queens Boulevard because parking spots were removed to make way for the bike lanes. Starting in 2019, the whole boulevard was to have been totally overhauled in a manner similar to the Grand Concourse's capital reconstruction. Partially as a result of these safety improvements, there were no pedestrian deaths on Queens Boulevard between 2014 and 2017. The first segment to be overhauled, between Roosevelt Avenue and 73rd Street, received federal funding from the Infrastructure Investment and Jobs Act in 2023; it is expected to be renovated for $23.75 million between late 2024 and 2027.

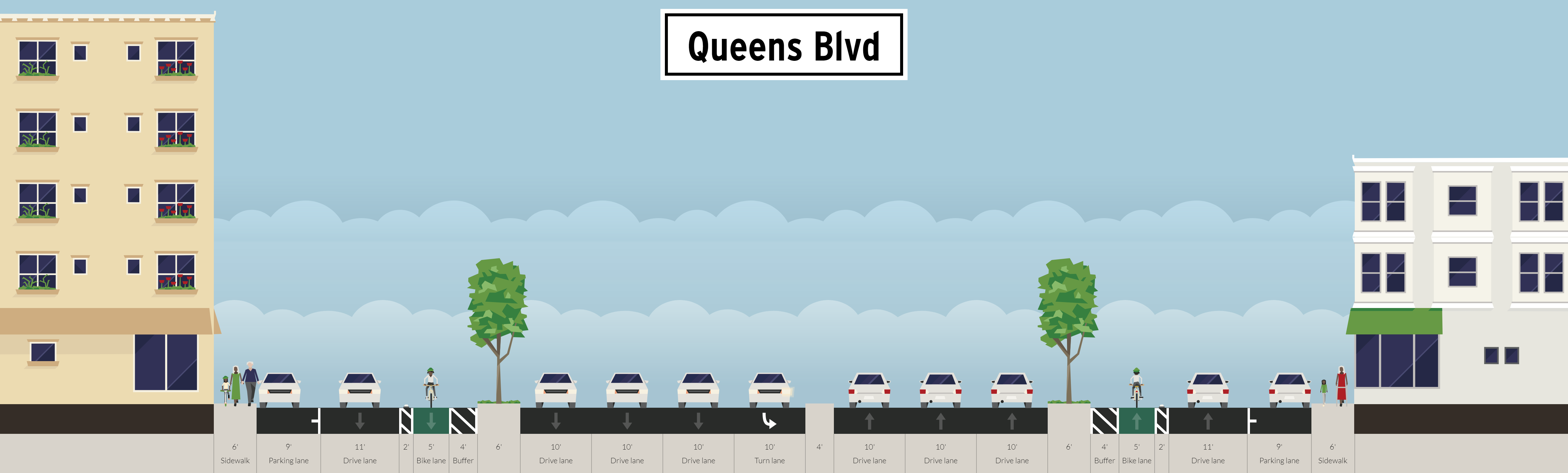
Typical cross-section of Queens Boulevard after the addition of safety improvements, but before capital renovation

== Issues ==
=== Pedestrian safety ===
Pedestrian Crashes on Queens Boulevard
| Year | Killed |
|---|---|
| 1990 | 18 |
| 1991 | 13 |
| 1992 | 5 |
| 1993 | 17 |
| 1997 | 18 |
| 2001 | 4 |
| 2002 | 2 |
| 2003 | 5 |
| 2004 | 1 |
| 2005 | 2 |
| 2006 | 2 |
| 2007 | 1 |

The combination of Queens Boulevard's immense width, heavy automobile traffic, and thriving commercial scene made it the most dangerous thoroughfare in New York City by the 1990s, and has earned it citywide notoriety and morbid nicknames such as "The Boulevard of Death" and "The Boulevard of Broken Bones". During the period 1950–2000, over 27,000 people were injured on Queens Boulevard. From 2002–04 there were 393 injuries and eight deaths. Queens Boulevard became known as the Boulevard of Death. New York Newsday and the New York Daily News got into a circulation war on the issue of the Boulevard of Death, and the DOT was under pressure to take action. Weinshall implemented pedestrian improvements on Queens Boulevard, including longer pedestrian crossing times, a lowering of the speed limit from 35 mph to 30 mph and the construction of new pedestrian median refuges. The safety improvements have proven successful, without the predicted backups.

Between 1980 and 1984, at least 22 people died and 18 were injured in a 2.5-mile (4.0 km) stretch of Queens Boulevard in Rego Park and Forest Hills. From 1993 to 2000, 72 pedestrians were killed trying to cross the street, or an average of 10 per year. Eighteen pedestrians were killed while crossing the boulevard just in 1997. Between 1990 and 2017, it was estimated that 186 people, including 138 pedestrians, died in collisions along Queens Boulevard. The street's design with straight wide lanes has encouraged drivers to drive as if they were on a highway, leading drivers to travel well above the speed limit. In addition, many people cross the Boulevard in areas without crosswalks since there are long stretches between intersections.

Some of the most dangerous crossings of Queens Boulevard are near Roosevelt Avenue, 51st Avenue, Grand Avenue, Woodhaven Boulevard, Yellowstone Boulevard, 71st Avenue, and Union Turnpike; all of these streets either have high vehicular traffic or cross the boulevard diagonally. Pedestrian crossings of Queens Boulevard can be up to 300 feet (91 m) long, or one-and-a-half times the length of a city block in Manhattan. As such, the Boulevard is hard to cross in one traffic light.

== Transportation ==
Queens Boulevard hosts one of the highest numbers of New York City Subway services in the city. It is served by the following subway lines:

- The E, F, <F>, M, and R (IND Queens Boulevard Line) serve the boulevard between Briarwood and Grand Avenue-Newtown, with one extra station at the western end.
- The 7, <7>, N and W (IRT Flushing Line) serve the boulevard between 46th and 33rd Streets.

Both use stretches of the right of way; only Broadway (nine services), Sixth Avenue (seven) in Manhattan and Fulton Street (eight) in Brooklyn carry more at any one time.

It is also served by the following bus routes:

- The Q60 bus travels the entire length of Queens Boulevard.
- The Q32 serves the corridor west of Roosevelt Avenue.
- The Q59 and Q98 run between Grand Avenue and Horace Harding Expressway, with the former originating westbound service at 62nd Drive. Westbound buses are absent from 90th Street to 56th Avenue.
- The Q20 runs between Jamaica Avenue and Main Street and is joined by the Q44 SBS north of Hillside Avenue.
- The Q45, Q46 and Q48 run between Union Turnpike and 77th Avenue, with Kew Gardens buses going out of service from 78th Crescent to 78th Avenue.
- The Electchester-bound Q64 runs from 108th Street to Jewel Avenue, with service originating at 70th Road. The Forest Hills-bound Q74 runs from 108th Street to 70th Road, deadheads to 70th Avenue, and begins QCC service running to Jewel Avenue.
- The Q23 runs between Yellowstone Boulevard and 108th Street.
- The Q53 SBS runs between Broadway and either Hoffman Drive (Rockaway Park), or Woodhaven Boulevard (Woodside).
- The Maspeth-bound Q38 runs from 62nd Drive to 63rd Drive.
- The Jackson Heights-bound Q29 runs from Woodhaven Boulevard to 90th Street.
- The Q72 deadheads west from 63rd Drive to Junction Boulevard to change its destination from Rego Park to LaGuardia Airport.
- The Q104 deadheads west from 48th Street to 47th Street to change its destination from Sunnyside to Astoria.
- East of 32nd Place, the following express routes head to destinations in Queens. Manhattan service turns onto Long Island Expressway:
  - The QM1, QM5, QM6, QM31, QM35 and QM36 go to Union Turnpike. They are joined with the QM7 and QM8 at the LIE.
  - The QM4 and QM44 run to Jewel Avenue, or from 69th Road when going to Manhattan.
  - The QM63 and QM64 serve until Van Wyck Expressway. They are joined with the QM21 and QM65 at the LIE.
  - The QM68 continues until Hillside Avenue.
- And these routes use the LIE in both directions:
  - The QM12 and QM42 run either to Horace Harding Expressway (Forest Hills) or from 62nd Drive (Manhattan).
  - The South Ozone Park-bound QM18 takes the exit to Kew Gardens Road. Manhattan service originates at 80th Road.
  - The Rego Park-bound QM10, QM11 and QM40 run until 63rd Road. Manhattan service uses Hoffman Drive instead.

For a few decades, streetcar service operated along the boulevard, and until 1957 operated along the sides of the Queensboro Bridge into Manhattan. For the section where the line ran concurrently with the IRT Flushing Line, the streetcars ran in a median below the viaduct supporting the elevated trains. In the space of the present-day Aviation High School, there was a train yard for the streetcars.

=== Major intersections ===
The entire route is in Queens County.

| Location | mi | km | Destinations | Notes |
|---|---|---|---|---|
| Long Island City | 0.00 | 0.00 | NY 25 west (Ed Koch Queensboro Bridge) / NY 25A (Jackson Avenue west / Northern Boulevard east) | Western terminus; NY 25 continues west |
| Long Island City | 0.3 | 0.48 | Van Dam Street to I-495 (Long Island Expressway) | |
| Sunnyside | 1.2 | 1.9 | Greenpoint Avenue west / Roosevelt Avenue east | Western terminus of frontage roads |
| Woodside | 2.19 | 3.52 | I-278 (Brooklyn-Queens Expressway) – RFK Bridge, Brooklyn, Staten Island | No direct eastbound access to I-278 west; exit 39 on I-278 |
| Elmhurst | 3.3 | 5.3 | Grand Avenue | |
| Rego Park | 3.91 | 6.29 | I-495 (Long Island Expressway) / Woodhaven Boulevard – Midtown Tunnel, Eastern Long Island | Grade-separated interchange; exit 19 on I-495 |
| Kew Gardens | 6.27 | 10.09 | Union Turnpike to Jackie Robinson Parkway | Eastern terminus of frontage roads; exit 7 on J.R. Parkway |
| Kew Gardens | 6.92 | 11.14 | I-678 south (Van Wyck Expressway) – Kennedy Airport | Eastbound exit and westbound entrance; exit 9 on I-678 |
| Kew Gardens | 7.0 | 11.3 | Main Street north | |
| Jamaica | 7.4 | 11.9 | NY 25 east (Hillside Avenue) | NY 25 continues east |
| Jamaica | 7.5 | 12.1 | Jamaica Avenue | Eastern terminus |
1.000 mi = 1.609 km; 1.000 km = 0.621 mi: Incomplete access; Route transition
