= Q60 (New York City bus) =

Bus route in Queens, New York

q60
- Queens Boulevard Line
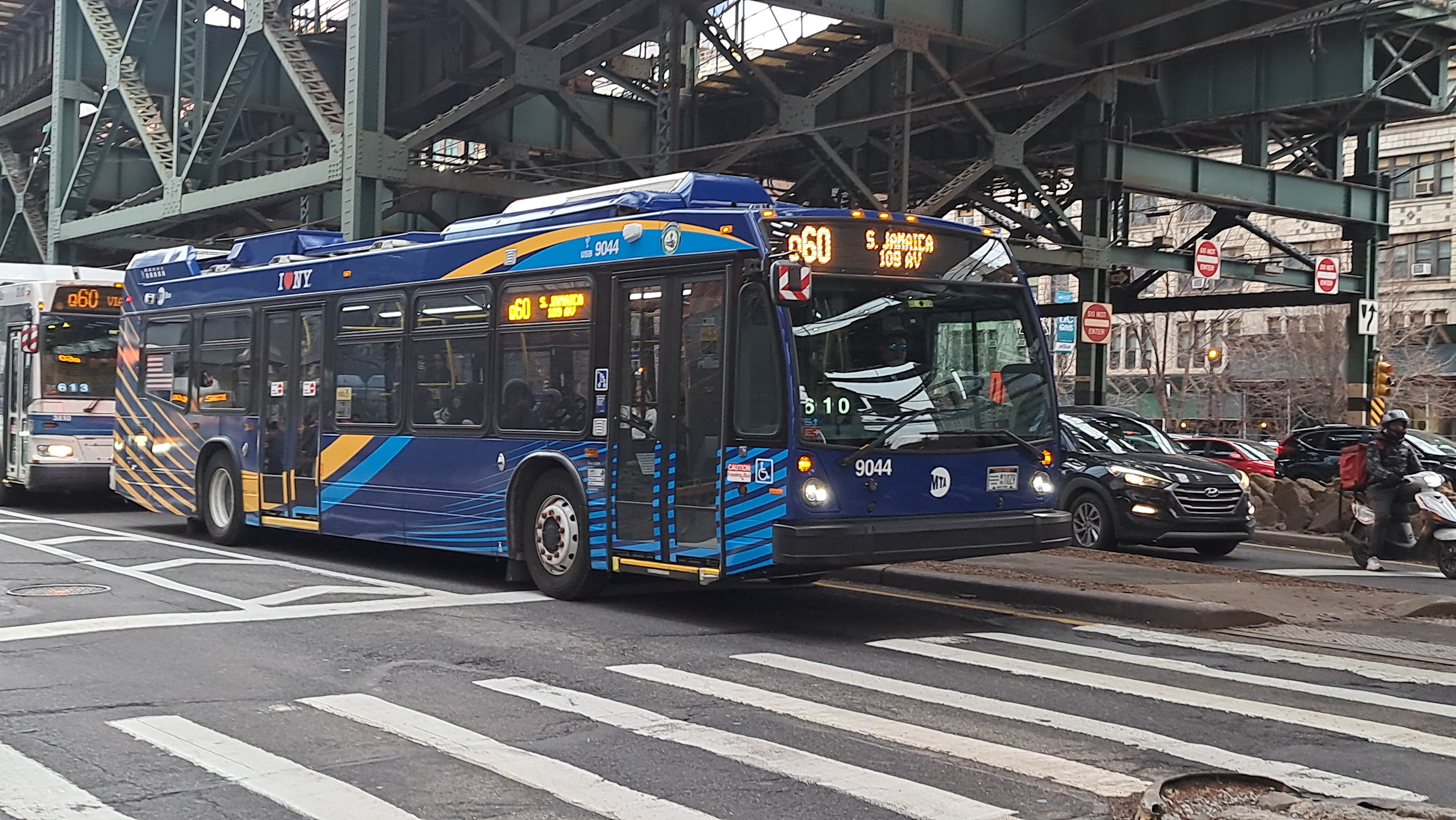
- A 2023 Nova Bus LFS (9044) on the South Jamaica-bound Q60

Overview
- System: MTA Regional Bus Operations
- Operator: MTA Bus Company
- Garage: JFK Depot
- Vehicle: Nova Bus LFS; New Flyer Xcelsior XD40
- Began service: January 29, 1913 (trolley line); April 17, 1937 (bus)

Route
- Locale: Queens and Manhattan, New York, U.S.
- Communities served: South Jamaica, Jamaica, Briarwood, Kew Gardens, Forest Hills, Rego Park, Elmhurst, Woodside, Sunnyside, Long Island City, East Midtown
- Start: East Midtown, Manhattan – Second Avenue and 60th Street
- Via: Queensboro Bridge, Queens Boulevard, Sutphin Boulevard
- End: South Jamaica, Queens – 109th Avenue and 157th Street
- Length: 10.7 miles (17.2 km)
- Other routes: Q32 Penn Station–Jackson Heights (west of 48th Street/Roosevelt Avenue); IND Queens Boulevard Line (Grand Avenue to Hillside Avenue)

Service
- Operates: 24 hours
- Annual patronage: 3,707,096 (2025)
- Transfers: Yes
- Timetable: Q60

The Q60 bus route constitutes a public transit line running primarily along Queens Boulevard in Queens, New York City, extending from Jamaica, Queens, to Midtown Manhattan via Queens Boulevard and the Queensboro Bridge. It is city-operated under the MTA Bus Company brand of MTA Regional Bus Operations.

The route was originally the Queens Boulevard Line, a streetcar line operated by the Manhattan and Queens Traction Company (also known as the Manhattan and Queens Transit Company) from 1913 to 1937, when it became a bus line. The route was taken over by Green Bus Lines in 1943 and operated by that company until its operations were taken over by the MTA in 2006.

== Route description ==
=== Streetcar route ===
The streetcar line began at Second Avenue in East Midtown Manhattan. The line proceeded across the Queensboro Bridge into Long Island City, Queens. It then traveled along the entire length of Queens Boulevard, situated in the median of the road, to Jamaica Avenue in Queens. It then traveled a short distance east on Jamaica Avenue, south on 139th Street, and east on Archer Avenue to Rockaway Road (later Sutphin Boulevard) at the Jamaica terminal of the Long Island Rail Road. The line proceeded south on Sutphin Boulevard to 109th Avenue (previously Lambertville Avenue and Pacific Street) and 157th Street (previously Norris Avenue) in South Jamaica.

The streetcars used the outermost roadways of the Queensboro Bridge's lower level, and ran to an underground terminal between 59th and 60th Streets. These tracks were shared with the Third Avenue Railway's 42nd Street Crosstown Line. Other streetcar lines ran in the inner roadways of the lower level. The bridge was also shared with elevated rapid transit service between the Queensboro Plaza station (now a subway station) and the Second and Third Avenue elevated lines. The southern (eastbound) roadway has since been converted to vehicular use, while the northern (westbound) roadway is now a pedestrian and bike path.

=== Current bus service ===
The current Q60 bus service follows the former trolley route from East Midtown to South Jamaica via Queens Boulevard and Sutphin Boulevard. During daytime hours, alternate buses begin or end service at Sutphin Boulevard and Archer Avenue. The bus route shares Queens Boulevard with two New York City Subway lines: the IRT Flushing Line (7 and <7> trains) between Queensboro Plaza and Roosevelt Avenue, and the IND Queens Boulevard Line (E, F, <F>, M, and R trains) between Grand Avenue and Hillside Avenue. The segment of Queens Boulevard between Grand Avenue and 62nd Drive is also shared by the Q59 bus, the segment of Queens Boulevard between Grand Avenue and Woodhaven Boulevard is also shared with the Q98 bus, while the segment west of Roosevelt Avenue is shared with the Q32. The Q60 shares the Queensboro Bridge with the Q32, and shares Sutphin Boulevard with the Q6, Q40, and Q41, which travel farther south to the vicinity of John F. Kennedy International Airport.

== History ==
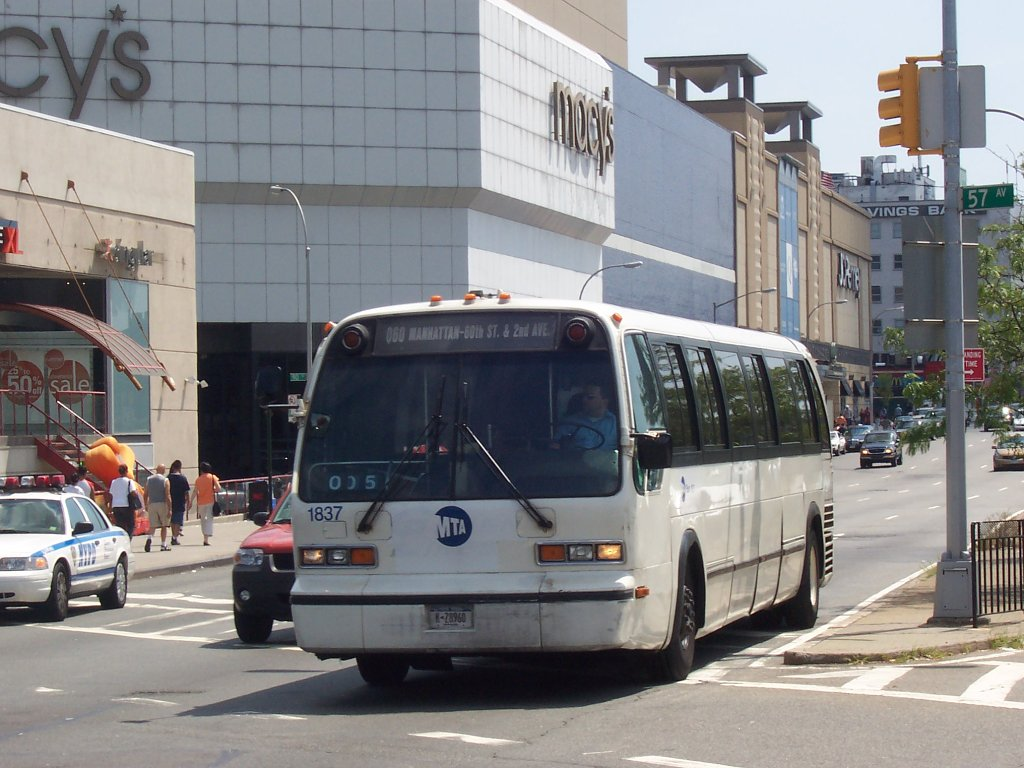
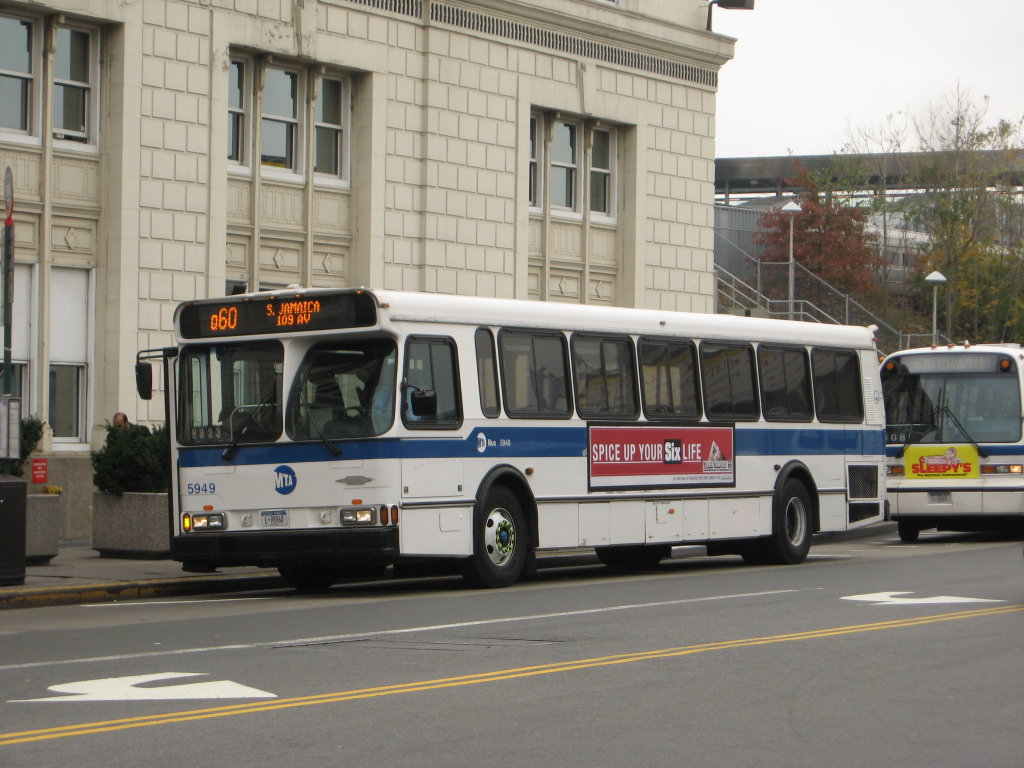
Two former Green Bus Lines buses on the Q60 under MTA Bus: a GMC RTS-06 (1837) bound for East Midtown, Manhattan, and a 1997 Orion V (5949) bound for South Jamaica, Queens.

=== Streetcar service ===
In 1909, the Manhattan and Queens Traction Company was granted a perpetual franchise by the city to build a streetcar line along Queens Boulevard towards the Queens-Nassau County border. On March 30, 1909, the Queensboro Bridge opened between Long Island City in Queens and Midtown Manhattan. Beginning on September 17 of that year, several trolley lines began service over the bridge. Construction on the Queens Boulevard Line began on November 2, 1912. On January 29, 1913, the Manhattan and Queens Traction Company began service over the bridge and along Queens Boulevard between Second Avenue and the intersection of 48th Street and Greenpoint Avenue in Woodside, Queens, near the current 46th Street – Bliss Street subway station. The line was extended east to Winfield (now a subsection of Woodside) on April 26, Grand Avenue in Elmhurst on July 28, and 71st Avenue in Forest Hills on August 27. On January 23, 1914, the line was extended to Hillside Avenue at the end of Queens Boulevard. On January 31 it was extended south to the Jamaica LIRR station. In April 1916, a shuttle service was instituted between Jamaica station and South Street (now South Road). The line was extended along Sutphin Boulevard to its final terminus at 109th Avenue and 157th Street on April 26, 1916. In 1917, a spur of the line along Van Dam Street in Long Island City (called the Van Dam Industrial Spur or the Industrial Center line) was inaugurated.

The Queens Boulevard line was originally planned to extend along 109th Avenue and Central Avenue (later known as Linden Boulevard) to St. Albans and Cambria Heights at the Nassau County line, a total distance of 15.5 miles (24.9 km). In 1918, an extension of the line was constructed east along 109th Avenue to 167th Street (near Merrick Boulevard). These tracks, however, were never used in service.

=== Decline and conversion to bus service ===
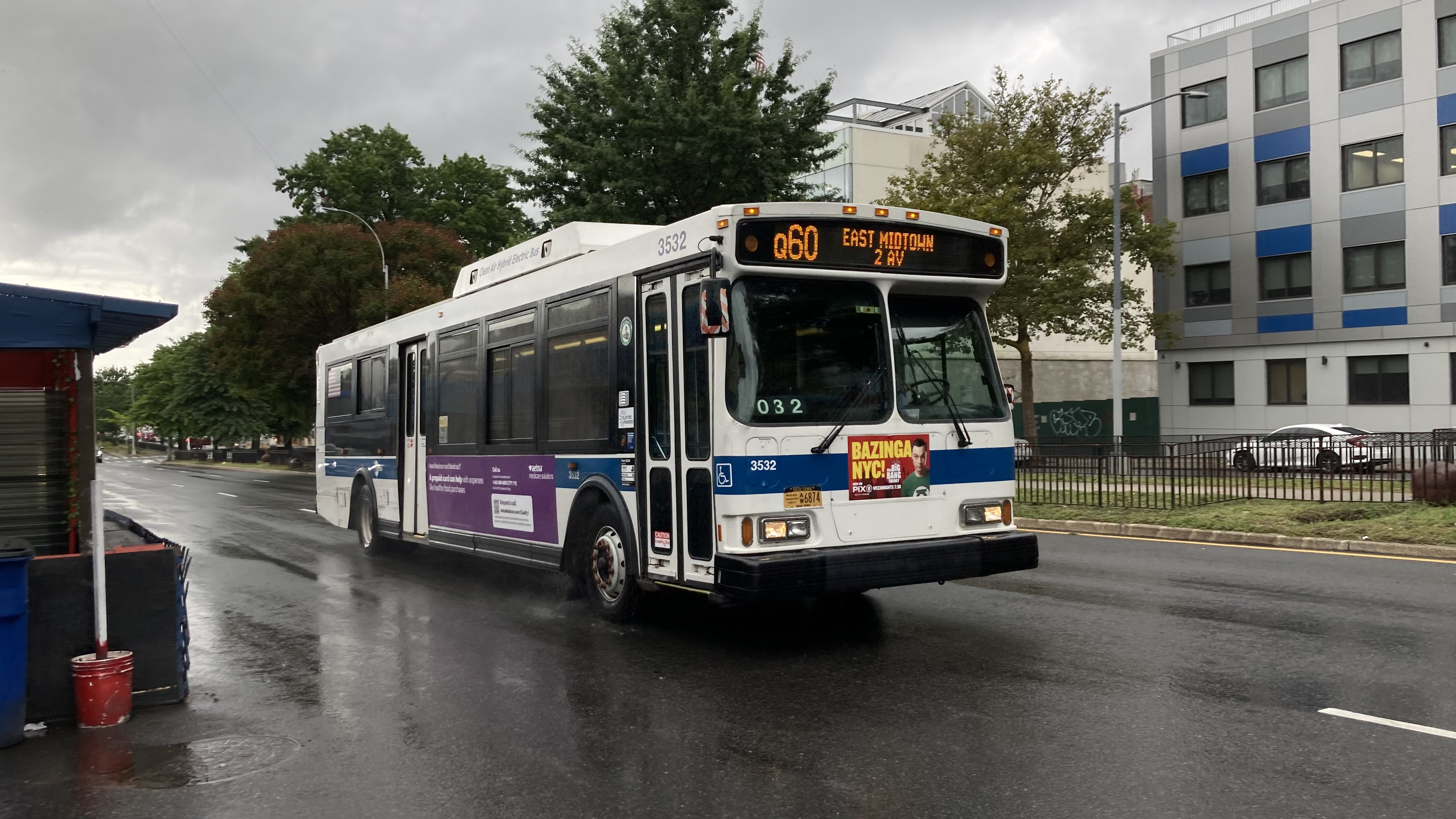
A 2006 Orion VII OG HEV (3532) on the Q60 to Jamaica, in Kew Gardens, Queens, but says East Midtown by mistake

Beginning in the 1920s, many streetcar lines in Queens and in the rest of the city were replaced by buses, particularly after the unification of the city's three primary transit companies in June 1940. The Queens Boulevard line began losing patronage and profits in the 1910s, due to the city-imposed 5-cent fare, and competition from parallel elevated rail and subway service running through Queensboro Plaza. The line also ran through sparsely populated territory, leading to low passenger use. Municipal buses replaced trolleys on a temporary basis during a worker strike in August 1920. Later that year on December 10, the Public Service Commission permitted the railway to charge a two-zone fare (10 cents) for travel past Grand Avenue in either direction. This was later extended east to Old Mill Road (now 63rd Road) in November 1923. Around this time, the city began to undertake a major widening project for Queens Boulevard. The railway company, however, refused to allow the city to remove the trolley tracks from the road, delaying the project for a decade until the 1930s.

As part of the widening project, in 1925 it was proposed to replace the trolley franchise with bus service. By 1927, civic groups from communities along the Queens Boulevard line began to push a takeover of the line's operations by the Fifth Avenue Coach Company to convert it to bus service. In October 1935, the city announced plans to convert the line into a bus route, as part of a deal with the railway to remove its tracks and facilitate the renovation project. In 1936 the railroad company would reorganize as the Manhattan and Queens Bus Corporation. On December 13 of that year, a ten-year bus franchise was awarded to the company by the office of Mayor Fiorello H. La Guardia. In exchange, the company would pay the city $318,000 in back taxes, and the two parties ended two decades of litigation over the removal of the trolley tracks. Bus service began on April 17, 1937, replacing trolley service along Queens Boulevard. The operations of the Manhattan and Queens Transit Company were acquired by Green Bus Lines in 1943, and the Q60 became part of Green Lines' operations.

The Q60 was one of the busiest bus routes in the Green Lines system, along with the Q10 along Lefferts Boulevard. In 1999, the New York City Department of Transportation (NYCDOT) planned to launch a tracking and countdown clock program on the Q60 route, separate from the MTA's efforts to install a bus tracking system. The DOT planned to put it in operation by 2002, but the system was never implemented.

=== MTA takeover ===
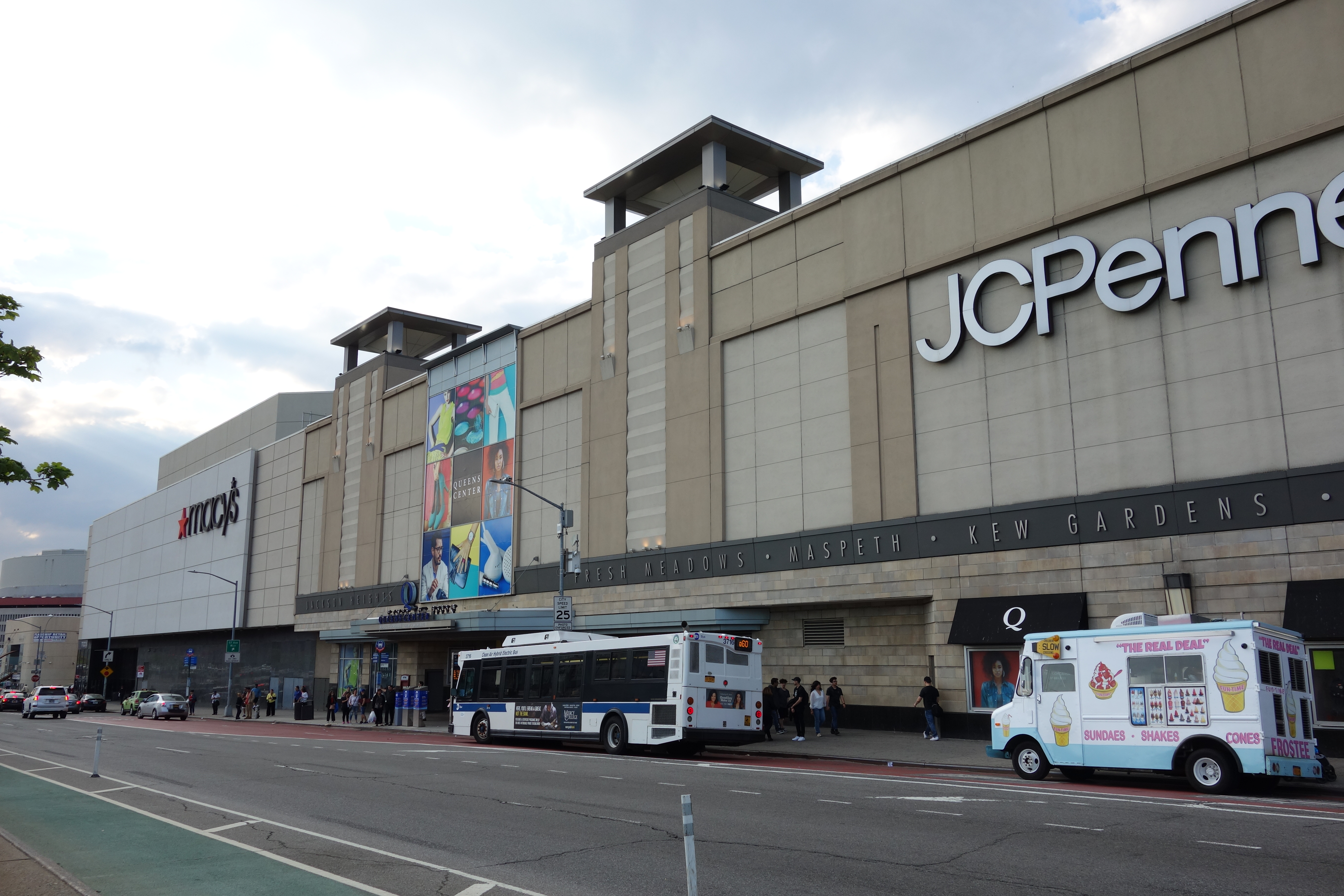
A 2007 Orion VII OG HEV (3716) on the East Midtown-bound Q60 at Queens Center Mall

On January 9, 2006, the MTA Bus Company took over the operations of the Green Lines routes, part of the city's takeover of all the remaining privately operated bus routes. Under the MTA in August 2007, overnight service on the Q60 was added.

On November 1, 2008, over 20 stops along the Q60 route were eliminated. According to the MTA, this was to improve travel times and maintain 750 feet (230 m) of space between bus stops as dictated by regulations. The changes led to complaints from local communities, due to many senior citizens who use the route.

On April 19, 2010, alternate weekday daytime and evening Q60 buses began short-turning at Archer Avenue and Sutphin Boulevard, instead of continuing to South Jamaica. On June 27, 2010, the route was rerouted to stay on Jamaica Avenue instead of diverting to 139th Street and Archer Avenue on the way to Sutphin Boulevard to speed up service by traveling on a direct path on a commercial street.

=== Bus redesigns ===
In December 2019, the MTA released a draft redesign of the Queens bus network. As part of the redesign, the Q60 bus would have terminated at Hunters Point, instead of crossing the East River. The redesign was delayed due to the COVID-19 pandemic in New York City in 2020, and the original draft plan was dropped due to negative feedback. A revised plan was released in March 2022. As part of the new plan, the Q60 will not be modified except for the elimination of closely spaced bus stops. A final bus-redesign plan was released in December 2023. The Q60 would not be modified except for the elimination of closely spaced bus stops and the elimination of a turn near Queens Plaza. On December 17, 2024, addendums to the final plan were released. Among these, stop changes were made on the Q60. On January 29, 2025, the current plan was approved by the MTA Board, and the Queens Bus Redesign went into effect in two different phases during Summer 2025. The Q60 is part of Phase II, which began on August 31, 2025.

== Connecting bus routes ==
- Q32, M15, M15 SBS (at Second Avenue, Manhattan)
- Q39, Q66, Q69, Q100 (at 28th Street)
- Q63, Q101, Q102 (at Jackson Avenue)
- Q104, B24 (at 47th/48th Streets)
- Q18 (at 65th Place)
- Q47 (at 69th Street)
- Q53 SBS, Q58, Q59 (at Grand Avenue/Broadway)
- Q11, Q14, Q29, Q52 SBS, Q53 SBS, Q59, Q88, Q98 (at Woodhaven Boulevard)
- Q38, Q72 (at 63rd Drive/Junction Boulevard)
- Q23, Q64, Q74 (at 108th Street)
- Q45, Q46, Q48 (at Union Turnpike)
- Q10, Q37, Q80 (at 80th Road)
- Q20, Q44 SBS (at Main Street)
- Q54, Q56 (at Jamaica Avenue)
- Q1, Q6 (at Sutphin Boulevard)
- Q8, Q24, Q30, Q31, Q43, Q75 (at Archer Avenue)
- Q25, Q65 (at 94th Avenue)
- Q9, Q40 (at Liberty Avenue)
- Q41, Q112 (at Tuskegee Airmen Way)

== See also ==
- Green Bus Lines
