= Pennsylvania Avenue (Brooklyn) =

Avenue in Brooklyn, New York

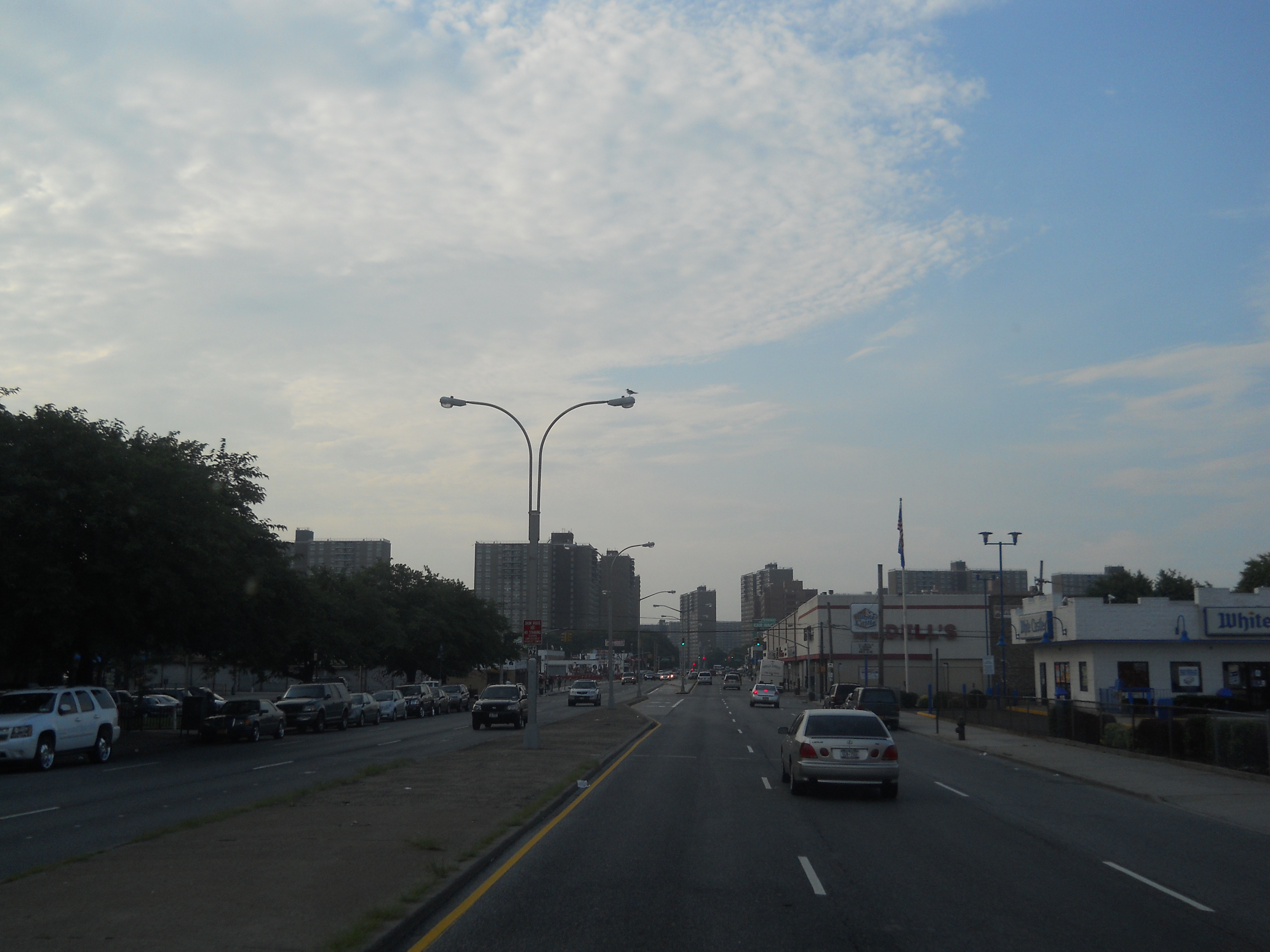
- Pennsylvania Avenue in East New York
- Interactive map of Pennsylvania Avenue
- Maintained by: NYCDOT
- Location: Brooklyn, New York City, United States
- South end: Belt Parkway
- North end: Jamaica Avenue

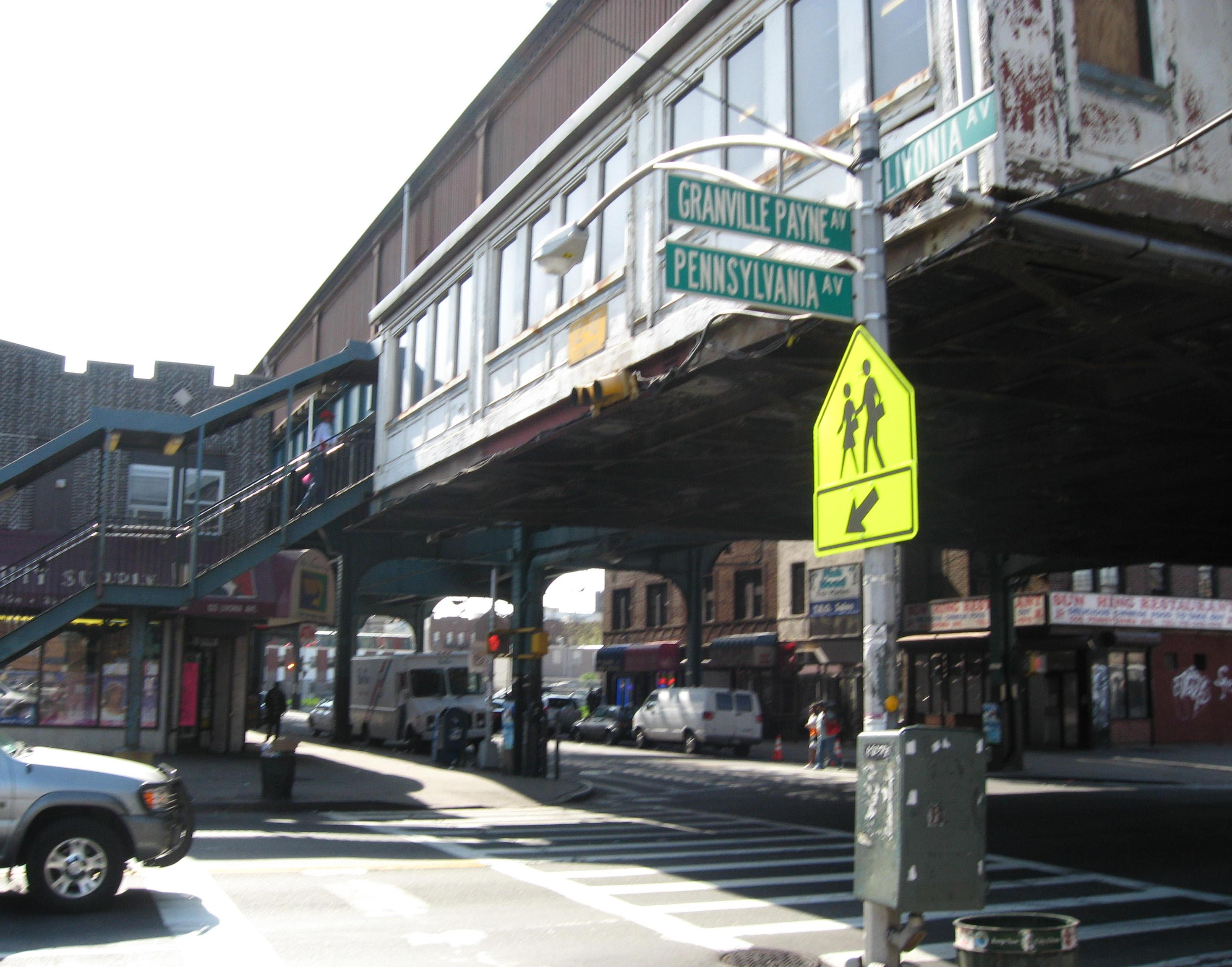
Pennsylvania Avenue at the corner of Livonia Avenue, near elevated subway station

Pennsylvania Avenue is a major north–south street in the East New York neighborhood of Brooklyn in New York City. It generally runs north to south, from the Jackie Robinson Parkway in Broadway Junction to the Belt Parkway in Starrett City.

Pennsylvania Avenue is also known as Granville Payne Avenue, named after a jazz musician and community activist.

== Route ==
From the Linden Boulevard intersection to the Belt Parkway junction, Pennsylvania Avenue has three lanes in each direction, with a concrete median and a center lane for left turns at some intersections. The segment between Linden Boulevard and the Jackie Robinson Parkway has three lanes in each direction, but no median.

Exit 14 on the Belt Parkway is the southern terminus of Pennsylvania Avenue. In 2019, the southern end of Pennsylvania Avenue was extended as the entrance to Shirley Chisholm State Park, built atop a decommissioned landfill facing Jamaica Bay.

== Transportation ==
The following subway stations served Pennsylvania Avenue:

- The New York City Subway's IRT New Lots Line (2, 3, 4, and 5 trains) has a station at the intersection of Pennsylvania Avenue and Livonia Avenue.
- The IND Fulton Street Line (A and C trains) has a stop at the intersection of Pennsylvania and Liberty Avenues.

It is also served by the following bus routes:

- The B20 runs north of Wortman Avenue, with Postal Facility service originating at Fulton Street.
- The B82/B82 SBS and rush hour BM2 run between Flatlands and Seaview Avenues, where they terminate.
- The B83 serves two portions of Pennsylvania Avenue. One is north of New Lots Avenue, and the other is between Vandalia Avenue and Shore Parkway. On the first portion, the Q24 joins in north of Atlantic Avenue, and the BM5 also serves the latter portion, but terminates at Seaview Avenue.

== Mall ==
In 2000, construction took place nearby Pennsylvania Avenue, across the Hendrix Creek in East New York to build a $192 million shopping complex, situated on the Belt Parkway. The shopping complex, known as the Gateway Center, was built on the Pennsylvania Avenue and Fountain Avenue Landfills, a 230-acre (0.93 km^{2}) Brooklyn landfill complex. Anchor tenants of the 640,000-square-foot (59,000 m^{2}) mall include Target, Home Depot, BJ's Wholesale Club, Marshalls and Bed Bath & Beyond. Restaurants, including Red Lobster and Olive Garden, are also part of the Gateway Center. Construction of Gateway Estates, a low income housing subdivision nearby, took place after the shopping mall opened in 2002. Due to the mall's location near roads with high traffic volume, including Pennsylvania Avenue, Erskine Street, Flatlands Avenue, and the Belt Parkway, local developers said it will attract shoppers from areas outside of Brooklyn, including Queens and Long Island. This development has been a significant project for economic resurrection and has created many jobs for people in the neighborhood of East New York.
