= Jamaica Avenue =

Avenue in Brooklyn and Queens, New York

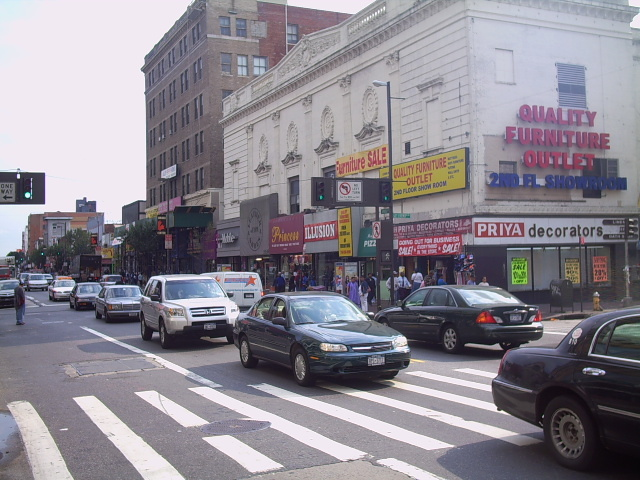
- Jamaica Avenue at Guy R. Brewer Boulevard
- Interactive map of Jamaica Avenue
- Maintained by: NYCDOT
- Length: 10.1 mi (16.3 km)
- Location: Kings and Queens counties, New York, United States
- West end: Fulton Street / Broadway / East New York Avenue in East New York
- Major junctions: Jackie Robinson Parkway / Pennsylvania Avenue / Bushwick Avenue in Cypress Hills; I-678 in Jamaica
- East end: NY 25 / Cross Island Parkway at the Bellerose–Bellerose Terrace line

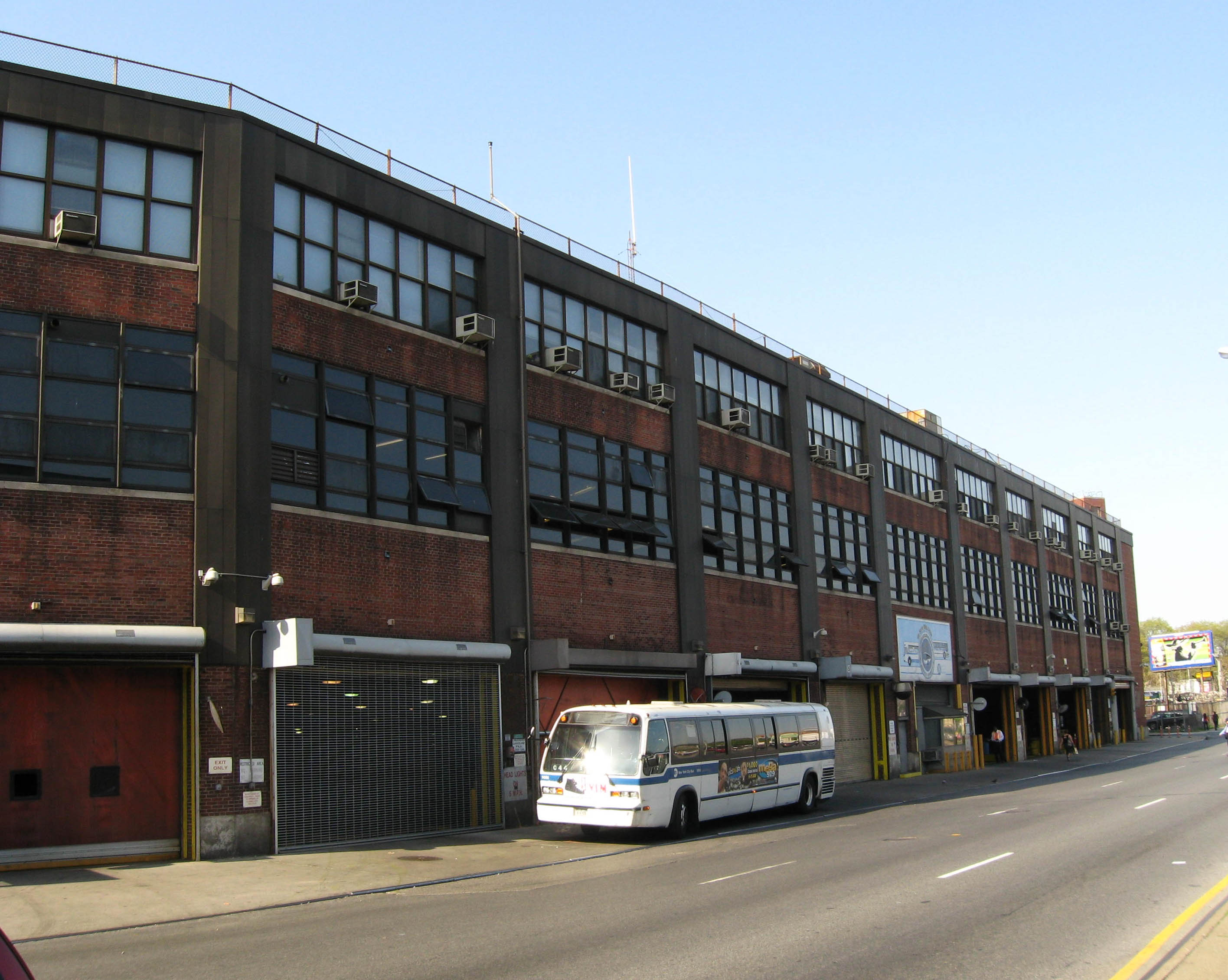
East New York bus depot on Jamaica Avenue

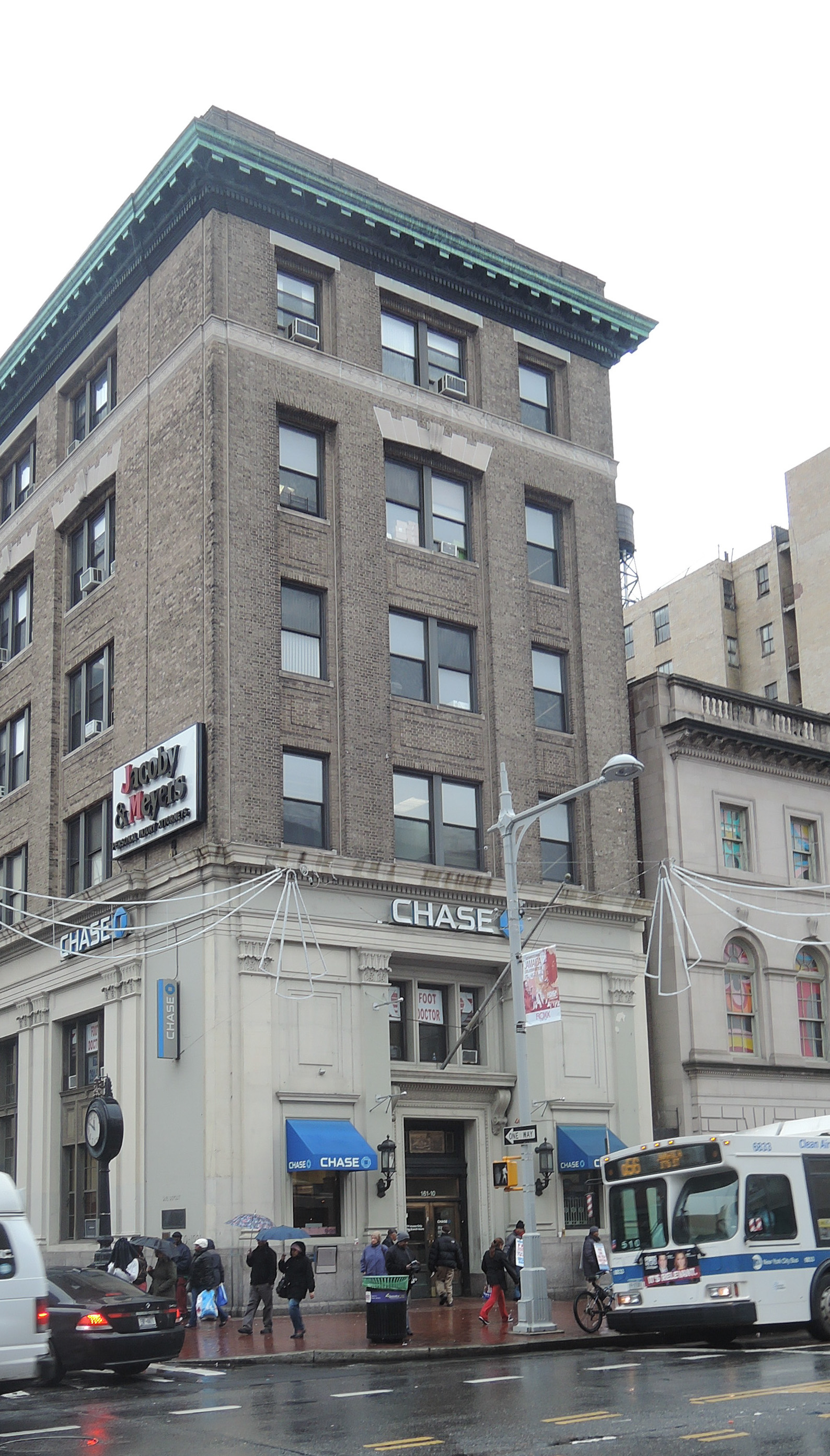
Chase Bank at 161st St and Jamaica Avenue

Jamaica Avenue is a major avenue in the New York City boroughs of Brooklyn and Queens, New York, in the United States. Jamaica Avenue's western end is at Fulton Street and Broadway, as a continuation of East New York Avenue, in Brooklyn's East New York neighborhood. Physically, East New York Avenue connects westbound to New York Avenue, where East New York Avenue changes names another time to Lincoln Road; Lincoln Road continues to Ocean Avenue in the west, where it ends. Its eastern end is at the city line in Bellerose, Queens, where it merges into NY 25 (Jericho Turnpike) to serve the rest of Long Island.

== History ==
Jamaica Avenue was part of a pre-Columbian trail for tribes from as far away as the Ohio River and the Great Lakes, coming to trade skins and furs for wampum. It was in 1655 that the first settlers paid the Native Americans with two guns, a coat, and some powder and lead, for the land lying between the old trail and "Beaver Pond", later Baisley Pond. Dutch Director-General Peter Stuyvesant dubbed the area "Rustdorp" in granting the 1656 land patent. The English, who took control of the colony in 1664, renamed the little settlement "Jameco", for the Jameco (or Yamecah) Native Americans.

During the early 19th century, the old road through Jamaica Pass was the Brooklyn Ferry Road; at mid-century this became the Brooklyn and Jamaica Plank Road, with toll booths. Late in the century the portion west of Jamaica Pass became Fulton Street, and the eastern portion Jamaica Avenue.

== Commerce ==
The part of Jamaica Avenue that runs through Jamaica, Queens is an important shopping street, and is on par with Brooklyn's Fulton Street. Prices are said to be low, in an exciting market place atmosphere. It is also the historic center of the former village with several city landmarks including the King Manor.

Jamaica Avenue is also the main shopping street for many other neighborhoods it runs through as well, including Woodhaven, Richmond Hill, and Queens Village.

== Transportation ==
Jamaica Avenue is the starting point of many newer streets in Queens, such as Hempstead Avenue, Guy R. Brewer Boulevard, Farmers Boulevard, and Queens Boulevard.

Jamaica Avenue is served by the following:

- The Q56 is designated “Jamaica Avenue (West)”, and serves the corridor west of 170th Street (Jamaica), where it terminates, or 171st Street (Broadway Junction).
- The Q110 is designated “Jamaica Avenue (East)”, and serves the corridor east of 153rd Street (Parsons Boulevard station) or Parsons Boulevard (Floral Park). The Q36 joins in east of Springfield Boulevard.
- The New York City Subway's BMT Jamaica Line (J and Z trains) runs above Jamaica Avenue through the Cypress Hills section of Brooklyn along with Woodhaven and Richmond Hill.
- The Q54 runs on the avenue between the Q56’s Jamaica terminus, and either 132nd Street (Jamaica), or 131st Street (Williamsburg).
- The Q24 bus runs in both directions west of Pennsylvania Avenue, sharing Bushwick service with the northbound B20 and B83 buses.
- From Sutphin Boulevard, the Q20, Q60 and Sutphin-JFK station-bound Q43 run west, respectively to Queens Boulevard and 146th Street, and the Q6, Q8, Q9, and Q41 run east, either to 168th Street (Jamaica Bus Terminal), or from 169th Street (opposite terminals).
- Jamaica-bound Q30, Q31 and Q75 buses run west from Merrick Boulevard to 146th Street, and are supplemented by Jamaica-bound Q25, Q65 buses from Parsons Boulevard to Sutphin Boulevard.
- Between Merrick Boulevard and 168th Street, Flushing-bound Q17 buses run east, while Jamaica-bound Q20 and Q44 SBS buses run west.
- East New York-bound Q112 buses run east from Parsons to Guy R. Brewer Boulevards.
- The B13 runs between Cypress Hills Street and either Crescent Street (Wyckoff Heights Hospital) or Hemlock Street (Gateway Mall).
- From Francis Lewis Boulevard, the n1’s Jamaica trips and the n6/n6X serve the corridor east until Hempstead Avenue, with n24 service extended to the avenue’s eastern end.
- The Q55 uses the avenue from 117th Street to Myrtle Avenue to change its direction from Richmond Hill to Ridgewood.
- The Jamaica Bus Depot, Queens Village Bus Depot and East New York Bus Depot are located near the avenue.

In June 2020, mayor Bill de Blasio announced that the city would test out a "busway" project on Jamaica Avenue from Sutphin Boulevard to 168th Street, a distance of about 0.9 miles (1.4 km), in downtown Jamaica. This restricted that stretch of Jamaica Avenue in both directions to buses only, except that other vehicles could enter at certain points as long as they exited at the very next right turn. The project was implemented in October 2021, but was curtailed by late 2022 in response to opposition from local merchants. The busway's regulations, which had been in effect 24 hours a day, seven days a week, were reduced to 8 AM - 6 PM, seven days a week. Some area polticial figures had wanted a further reduction to just weekday rush hours (6 AM - 10 AM and 4 PM - 7PM). While some transportation advocates did support a bus lane in downtown Jamaica, they more strongly defended the busway on a short stretch of the busier Archer Avenue corridor, which parallels Jamaica Avenue to the south, and still remains in effect at all times.

Jamaica Avenue intersects with other former country roads in Queens which have become important urban streets, including Woodhaven Boulevard, Myrtle Avenue, Lefferts Boulevard, Metropolitan Avenue, Sutphin Boulevard, Parsons Boulevard, Francis Lewis Boulevard, and Springfield Boulevard. Jamaica Avenue, from Alabama Avenue in East New York, Brooklyn to the Nassau County line, is 10.9 miles (17.5 km) long.

The Jamaica Center–Parsons/Archer station (E, J, and Z trains) with its associated bus station is a major transport hub, a rival to the nearby Jamaica–179th Street station (F and <F> trains) on Hillside Avenue.

== Major intersections ==
County	Location	mi	km	Destinations	Notes
Brooklyn	East New York	0.0	0.0	Fulton Street / Broadway / East New York Avenue	Western terminus
Brooklyn	East New York	0.2	0.32	Jackie Robinson Parkway east / Pennsylvania Avenue / Bushwick Avenue – Eastern Long Island	Western terminus of Jackie Robinson Parkway
Queens	Woodhaven	2.8	4.5	Woodhaven Boulevard	
Queens	Richmond Hill	4.0	6.4	Hillside Avenue / Myrtle Avenue / Lefferts Boulevard	
Queens	Richmond Hill	4.7	7.6	Metropolitan Avenue	
Queens	Richmond Hill	4.8	7.7	I-678 (Van Wyck Expressway)	Exit 6 on I-678
Queens	Jamaica	4.9	7.9	Queens Boulevard	To NY 25
Queens	Jamaica	6.1	9.8	Merrick Boulevard	
Queens	Hollis–Queens Village line	8.3	13.4	Francis Lewis Boulevard	
Queens–Nassau county line	Bellerose–Bellerose Terrace line	10.0	16.1	Cross Island Parkway – Verrazzano Bridge, Whitestone Bridge	Exit 27W on Cross Island Parkway
Queens–Nassau county line	Bellerose–Bellerose Terrace line	10.1	16.3	NY 25 (Braddock Avenue / Jericho Turnpike)	Eastern terminus
1.000 mi = 1.609 km; 1.000 km = 0.621 mi
