= Richmond Hill Historic District =

Historic district in Queens, New York

- U.S. National Register of Historic Places
- U.S. Historic district
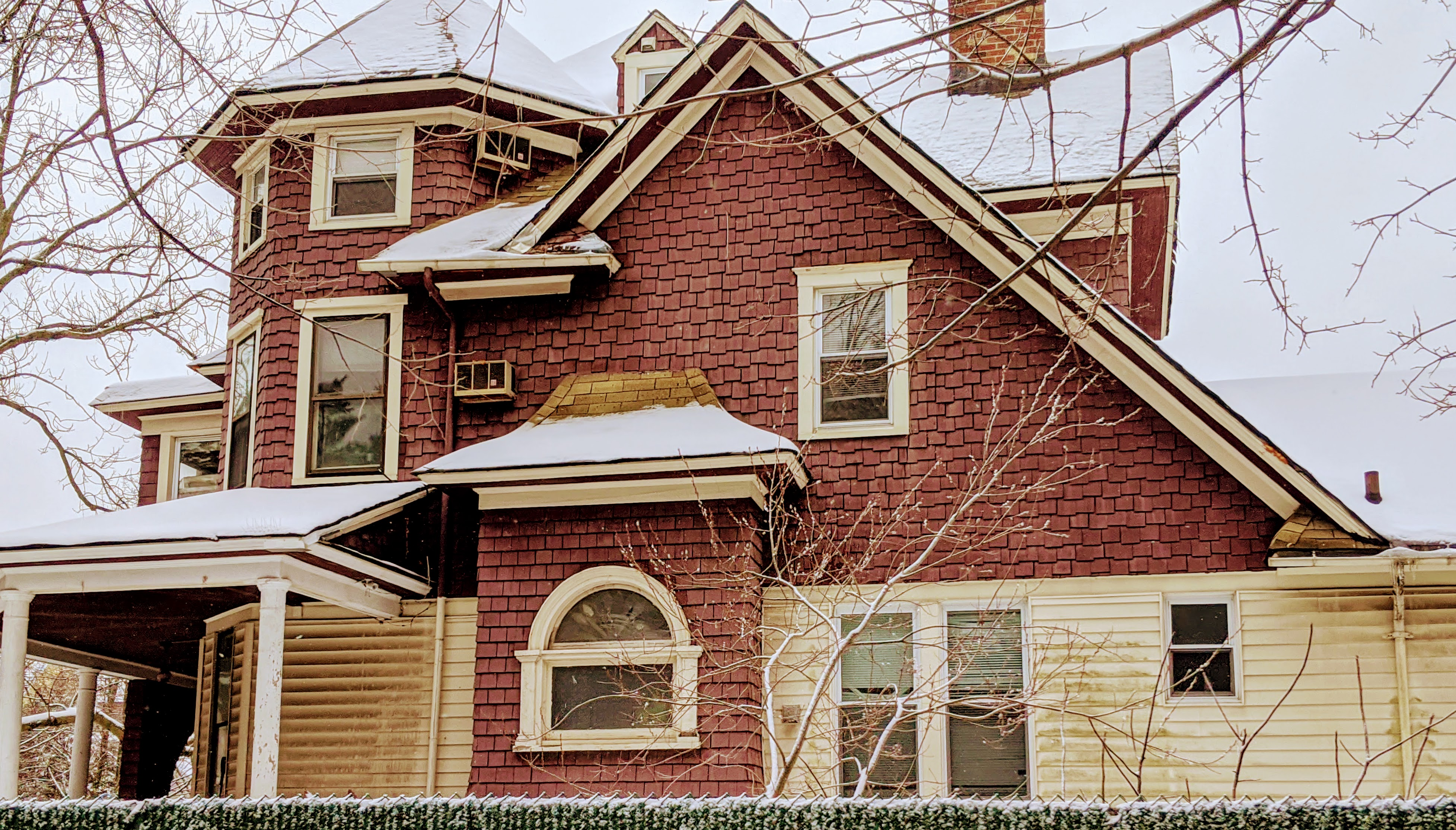
- Richmond Hill Historic District

- Location within New York City Location within New York
- Location: Generally 84th-85th Aves. & 113th to 118th Sts., Queens, New York
- Coordinates: 40.7031°N 73.8353°W
- Area: 29.97 acres (12.13 ha)
- NRHP reference No.: 100003430
- Added to NRHP: March 7, 2019

Richmond Hill Historic District is a national historic district in Richmond Hill, Queens, New York. It is bounded to the north by Park Lane South, to the east by 118th Street, to the south by Myrtle Avenue. The district includes 200 contributing buildings built between 1890 and 1915 next to the former South Side Railroad line (now the Long Island Rail Road's Montauk Branch) and the Richmond Hill station at Hillside Avenue, shaped roughly like a triangle. They consist mainly of architectural styles dating back to an earlier time of Academic Eclecticism in home building and were constructed for railroad commuters. Most of the contributing properties were planned as suburbs to Brooklyn and Manhattan. It also included smaller houses built between 1917 and 1930 at the beginning of the Great Depression.

It was listed on the National Register of Historic Places on March 7, 2019, with the ID number 100003430.

== Garden Homes ==
First nominated in 2008, it was denied recognition and after the nomination was revamped in 2017, it was accepted by the Landmark Preservation Commission on December 6, 2018, and added to the state registry. Richmond Hill, one of the first garden communities in eastern Queens County was acquired in 1868 by Englishman Albon P. Man, who developed the neighborhood of Hollis Hill. The architects favored English and neo-Tudor styles, which still predominate in many sections of the neighborhood. The core buildings of the historic district were different and clustered in 'the wedge'. Many used highly irregular massing—including projecting bay windows, corner turrets, and irregular rooflines—styles newly enabled by new window technologies and building techniques not previously used in residential homebuilding.

The district is bisected by the former South Side Railroad line, which had a station on Hillside Avenue called Clarenceville. The Long Island Rail Road provides freight access via the Montauk Branch, the Rockaway branch of that line took that right-of-way which runs diagonally through the neighborhood from northwest to southeast. There was a Long Island Rail Road station named Richmond Hill on Hillside Avenue and Babbage Street along the Montauk Branch. However, this station was closed in 1998 due to low ridership.

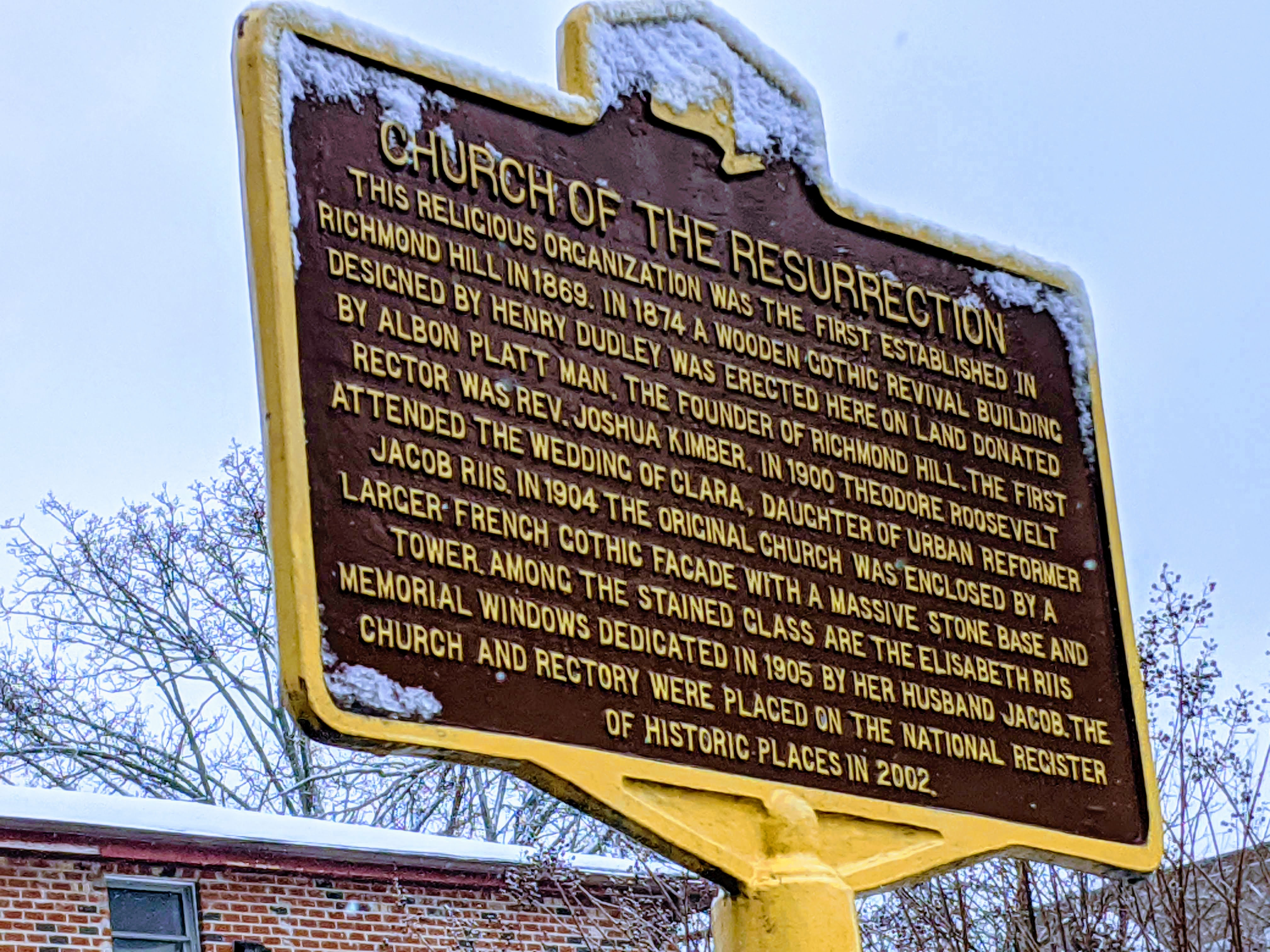
Historic Church

On the eastern edge of the district sits the Church of the Resurrection. This Episcopalian church is an 1874 structure and is the oldest house of worship in Richmond Hill. It was placed in the National Register of Historic Places in 2003.

Many residents own homes. The architect and musician William Gati owns a Spanish Colonial house in the district on 84 Ave and 113 Street. Near the northwest corner of Hillside Avenue and Myrtle Avenue sat an old time ice cream parlor, Jahn's. It closed in late 2007. Between Myrtle Avenue and the Montauk Line railroad is a former movie theatre, RKO Keith's Richmond Hill Theater, opened in 1929, functioning since 1968 as a bingo hall.

Many homes in the district are white. While color was not one of the restrictive covenants Man included in his contracts (no front yard fences was one such), some of the homes are done in pastel greens, pinks, purples and yellows and are popularly depicted as 'painted ladies'. The dominant architecture is called the Shingle style, there are also many in an earlier style called the Stick style, from columns, thin posts and rails, built in the late Victorian era, roughly 1885–1900. Man died in 1891, his sons carried on the development. Victorian homes pre-date the Tudors prevalent in Kew Gardens, Queens to its north, the neighborhood has been described as having some of the best suburban homes in the city.

== History ==
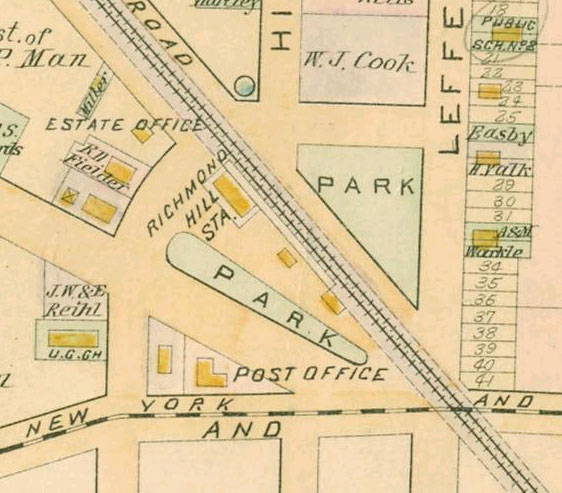
Development around railroad station, after two decades of operation, on an 1891 map

The hill referred to as Richmond Hill is a moraine created by debris and rocks collected while glaciers advanced down North America during the Wisconsin glaciation. Prior to European colonization, the land was occupied by the Rockaway Native American group, for which the Rockaways were named. In 1660, the Welling family purchased land in what was then the western portion of the colonial town of Rustdorp. The land would become the Welling Farm, while Rustdorp would be renamed Jamaica under British rule in 1664. The Battle of Long Island, one of the bloodiest battles of the Revolutionary War, was fought in 1776 along the ridge in present-day Forest Park, near what is now the golf course clubhouse. Protected by its thickly wooded area, American riflemen used guerrilla warfare tactics to attack and defeat the advancing Hessians. One of the sites that would make up modern Richmond Hill, Lefferts Farm, was said to be the site of a Revolutionary War battle. In January 1853, a Farming community was established on the south side of Jamaica Avenue between 110th and 112th Streets, known as Clarenceville. This land was purchased from the Welling estate. Richmond Hill's name was inspired either by a suburban town near London or by Edward Richmond, a landscape architect in the mid-19th century who designed much of the neighborhood.

== Geography ==
The District is located between Kew Gardens and Forest Park to the north, Jamaica and South Jamaica to the east, South Ozone Park to the south, and Woodhaven and Ozone Park to the west. Park Lane South forms its northern boundary with Forest Park and the right-of-way of the Long Island Rail Road (LIRR)'s Montauk Branch bisect the wedge-shaped neighborhood. The LIRR's abandoned stretch of the Rockaway Beach Branch has been suggested for a greenway to run from Sunnyside, Queens to Rockaway Junction

Richmond Hill is located in Queens Community District 9 and its ZIP Codes are 11418 and 11419.It is patrolled by the New York City Police Department's 102nd Precinct. Politically, Richmond Hill is represented by the New York City Council's 28th, 30th, and 32nd Districts.

=== Gallery ===
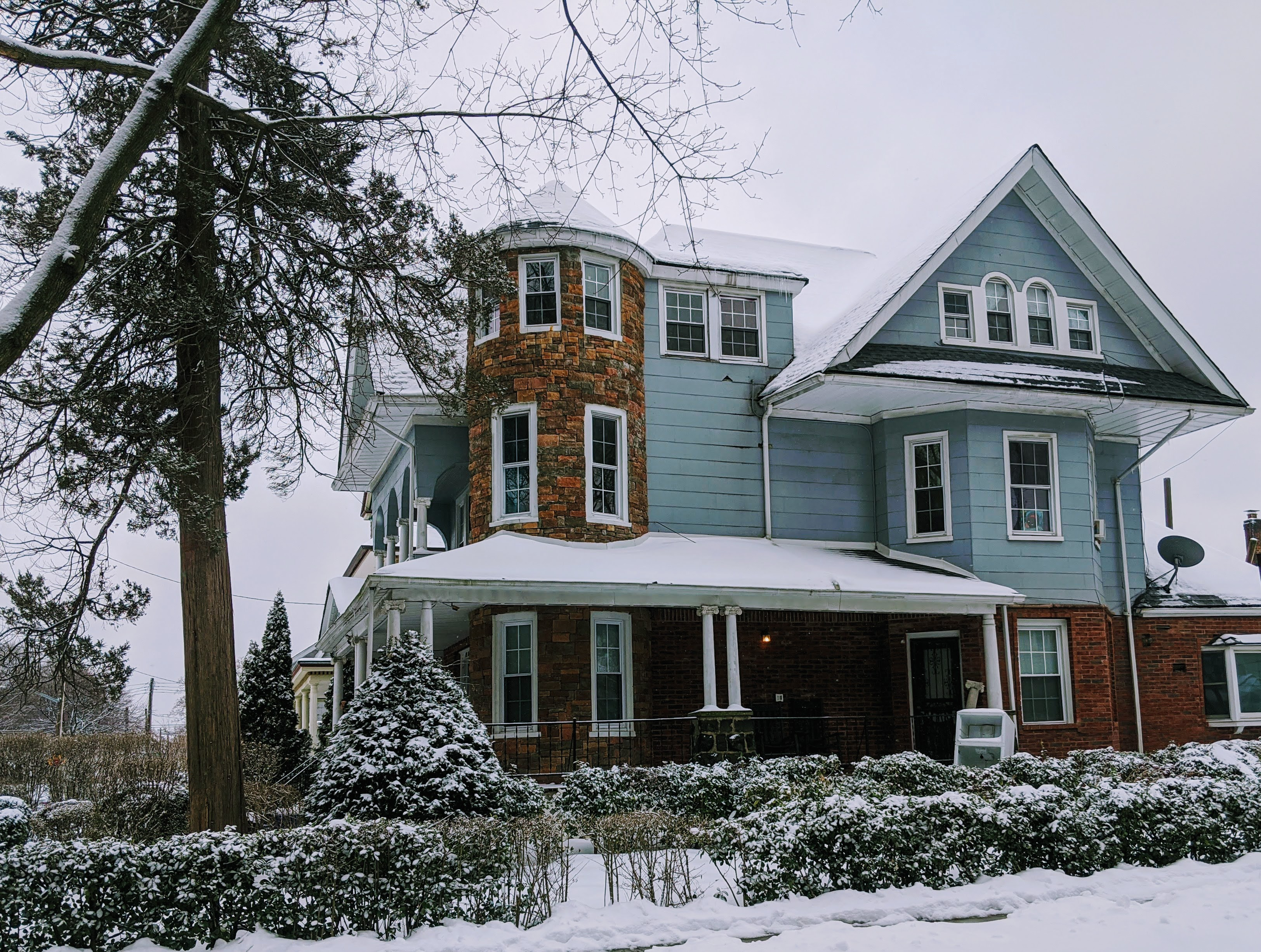
Contributing property NRHP Richmond Hill

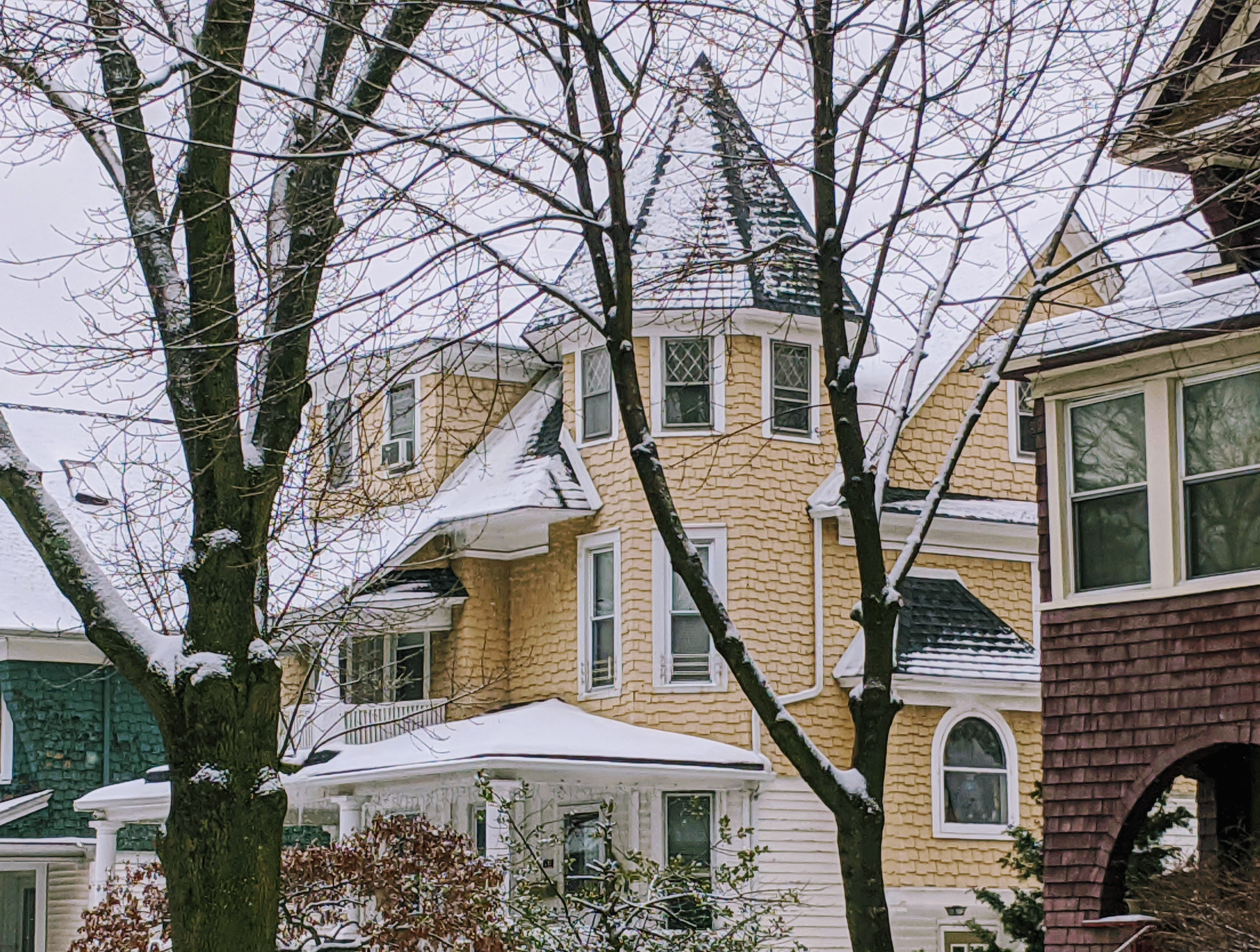
Contributing property Richmond Hill Historic District

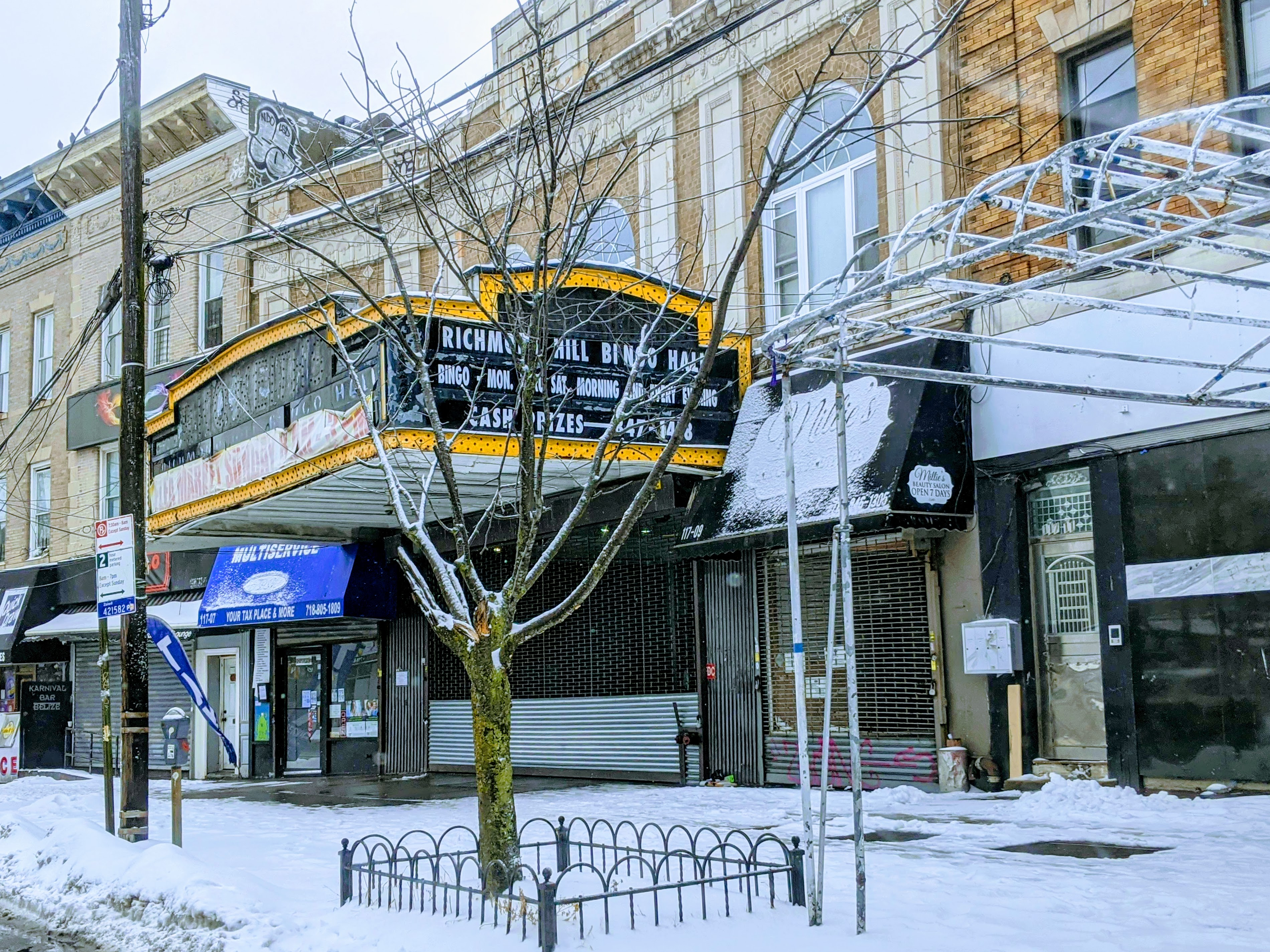
RKO Keith's, closed

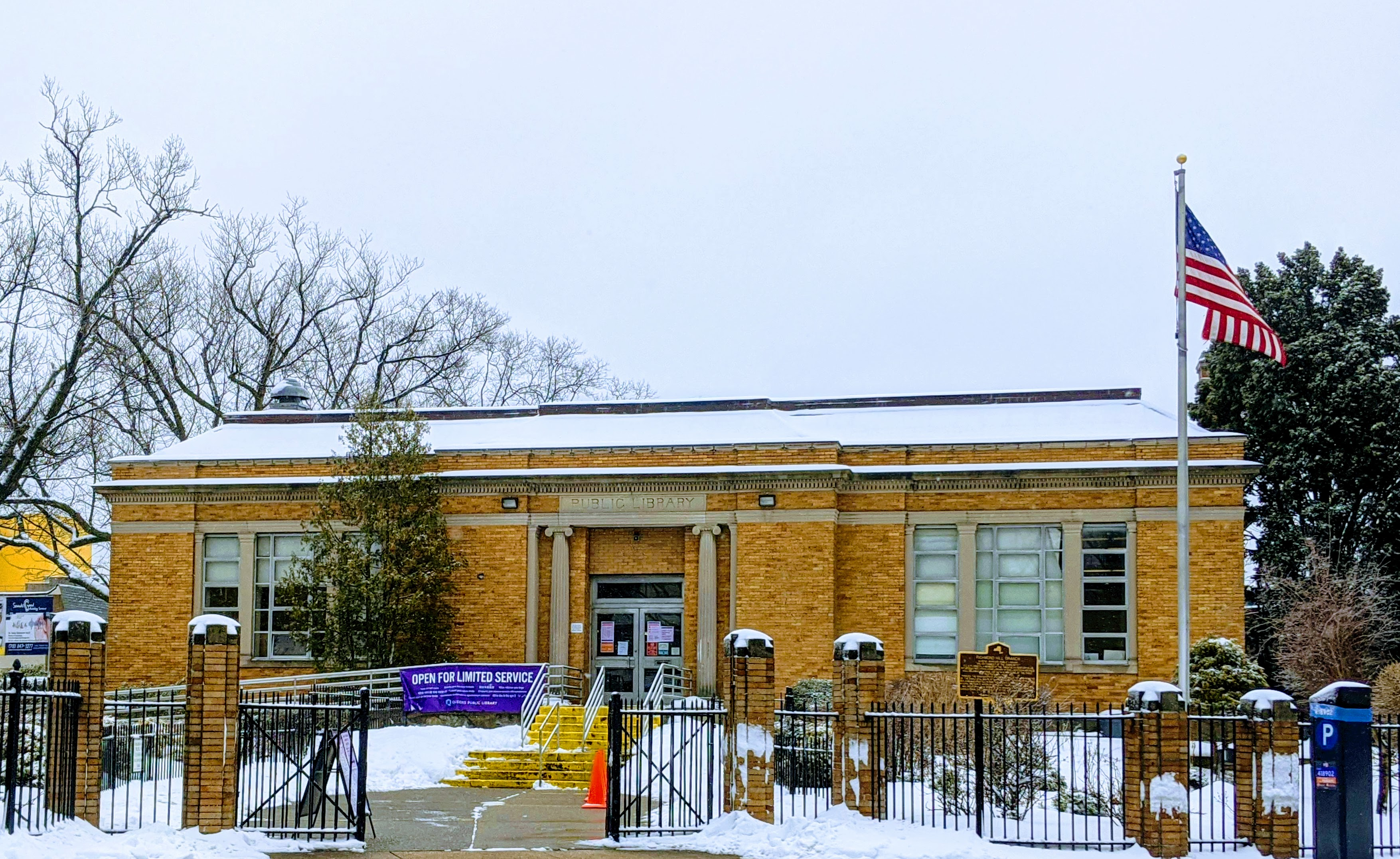
Richmond Hill branch NYPL

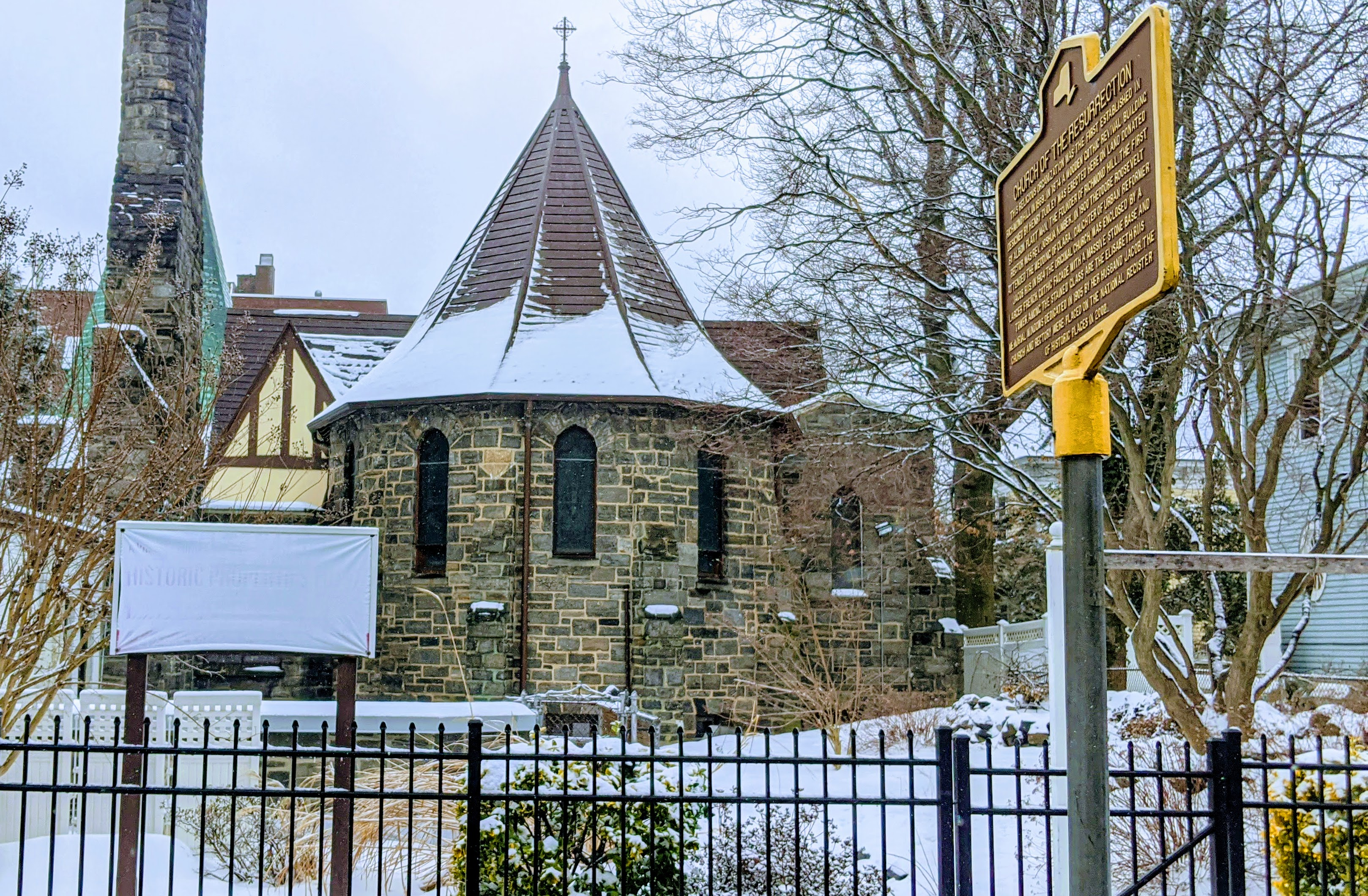
NRHP Richmond Hill Episcopalian church

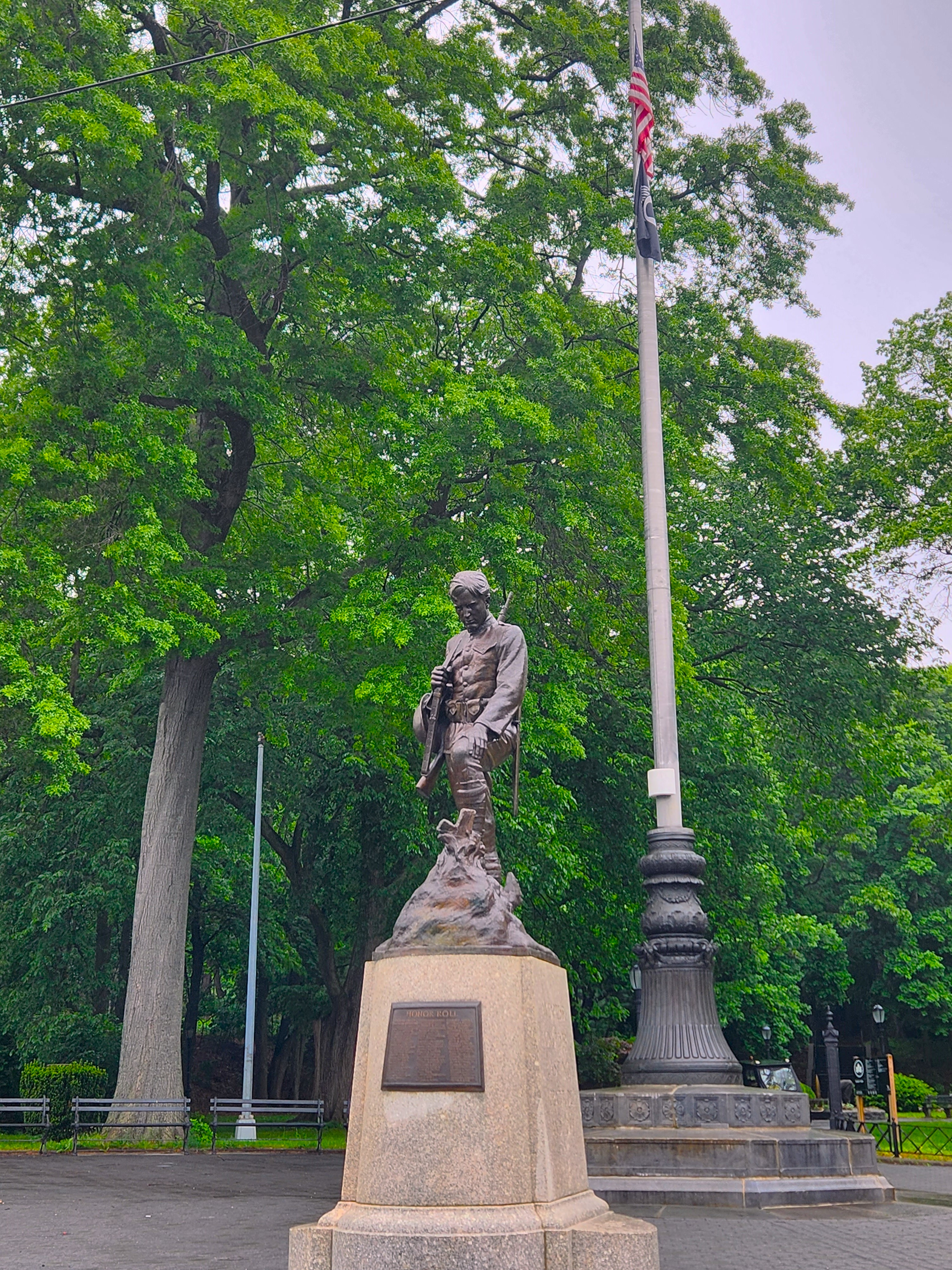
The Flagpole & My Buddys Statue

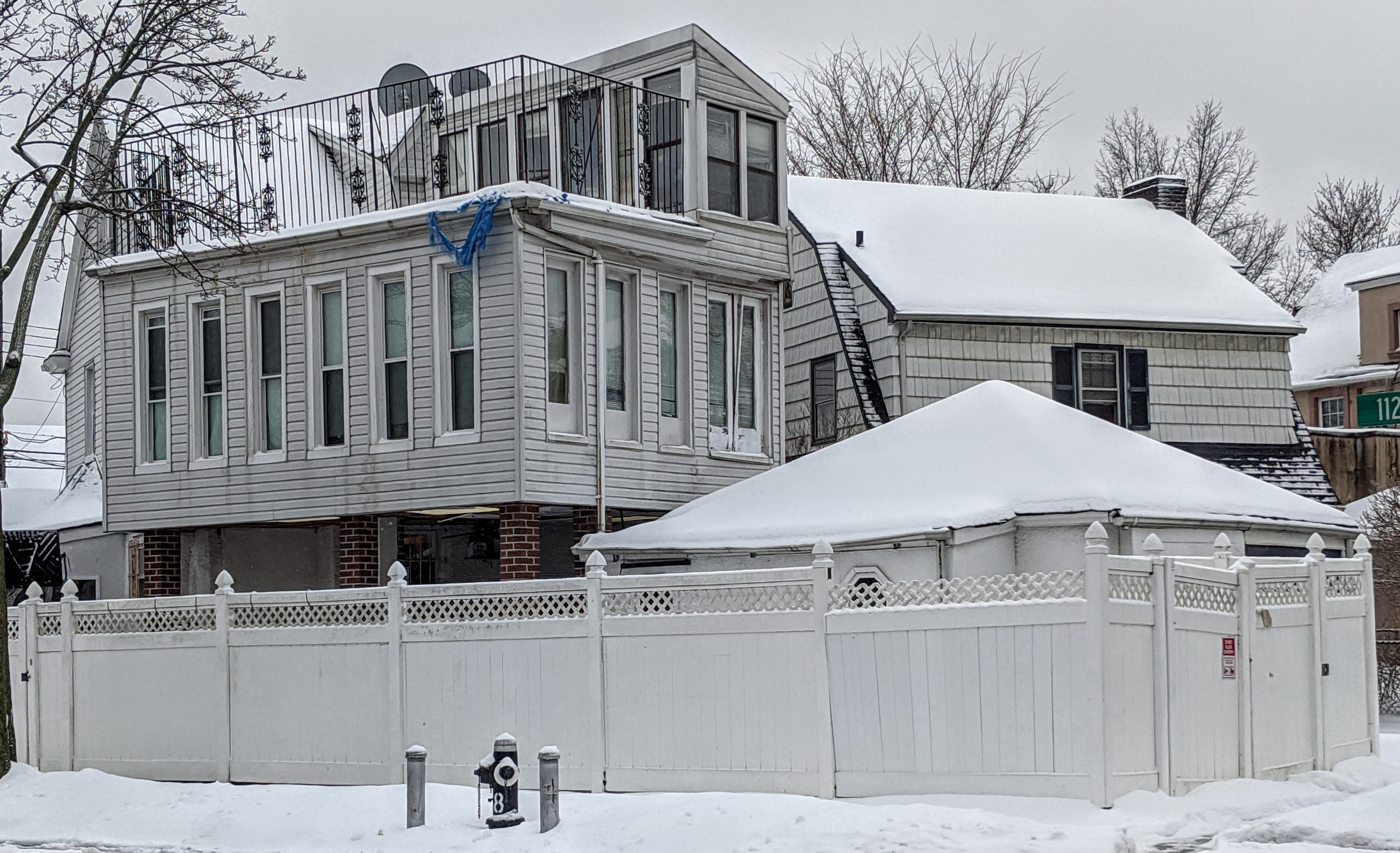
Contributing property NRHP

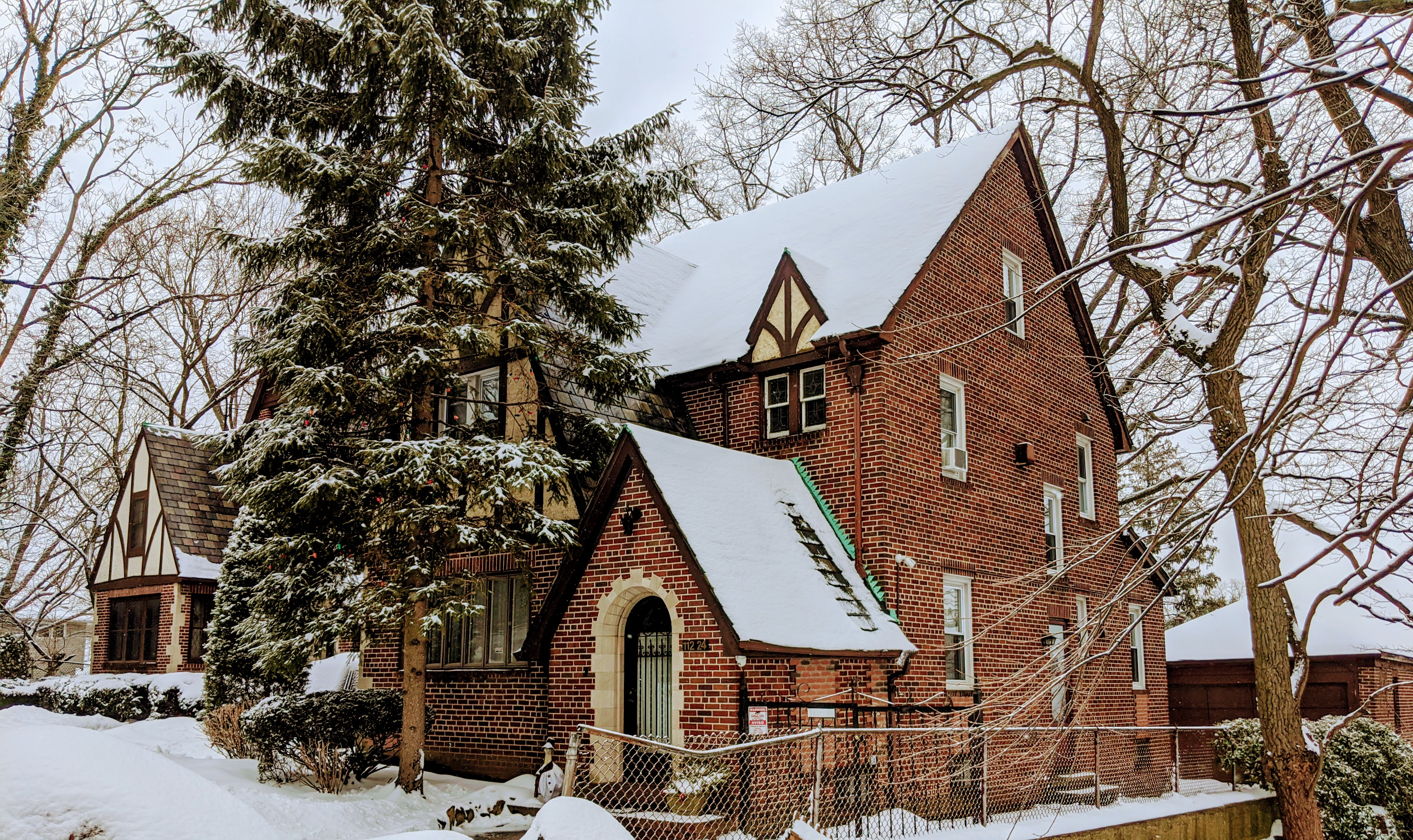
Contributing property NRHP

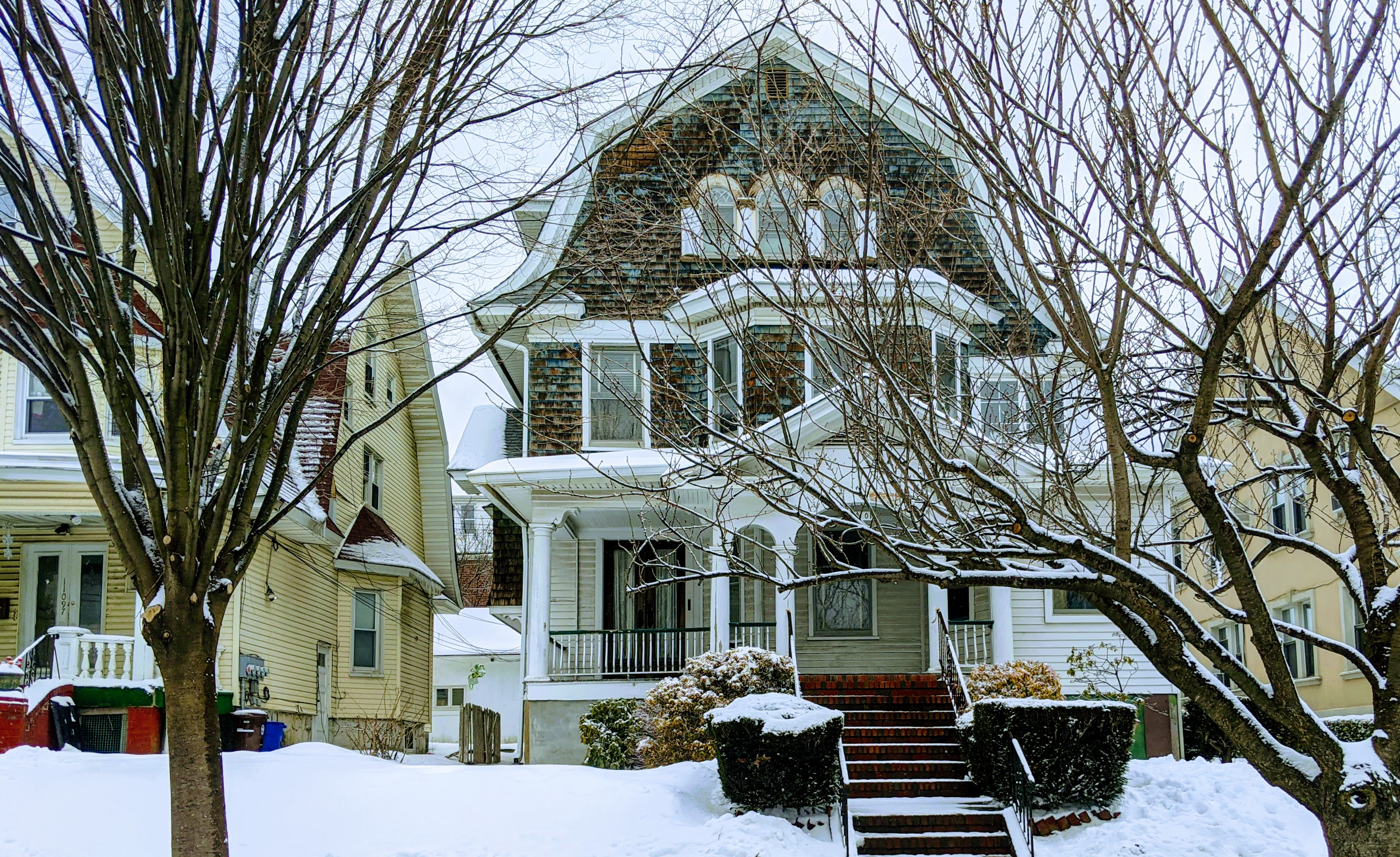
Contributing property NRHP

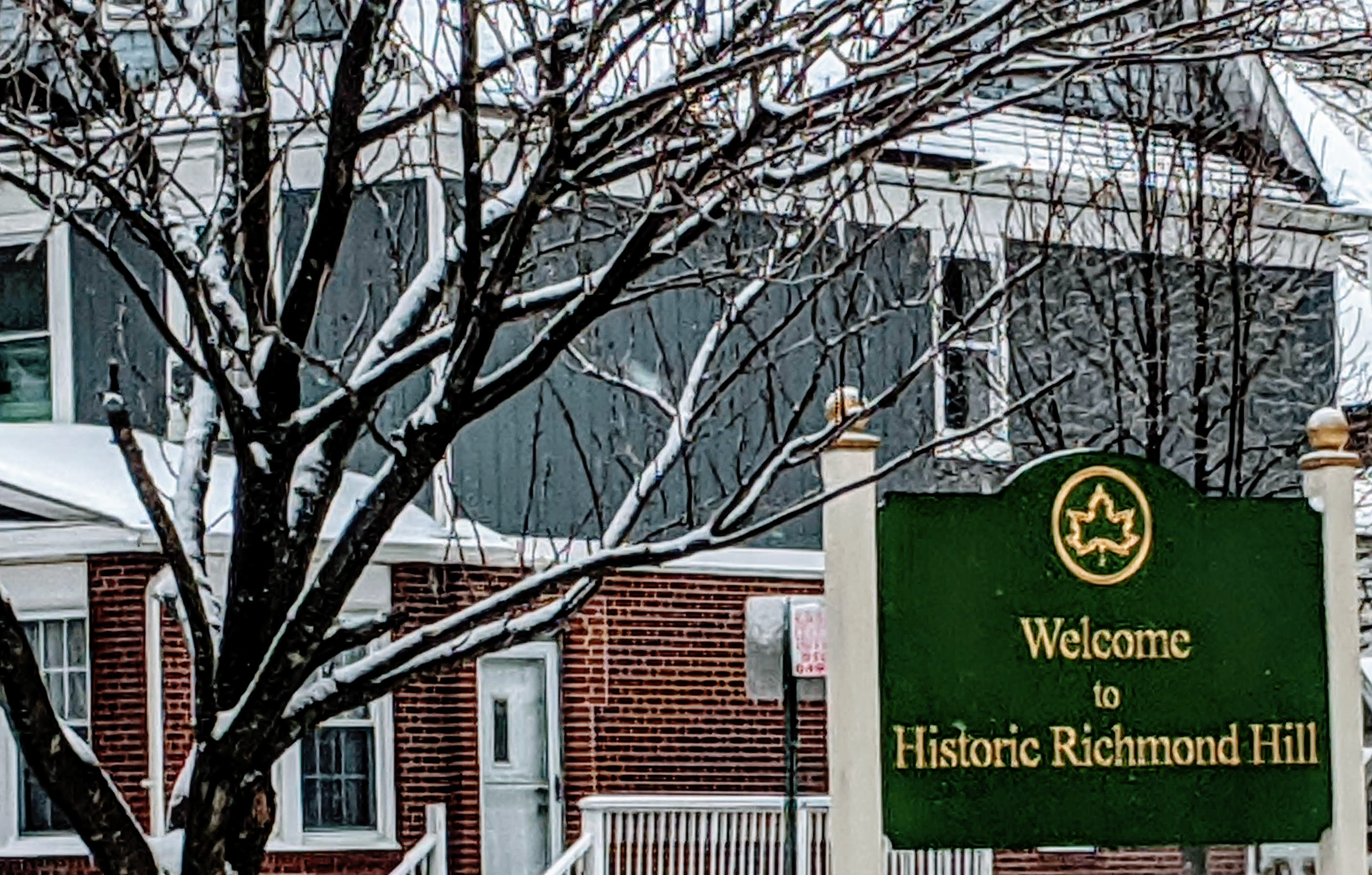
Richmond Hill sign

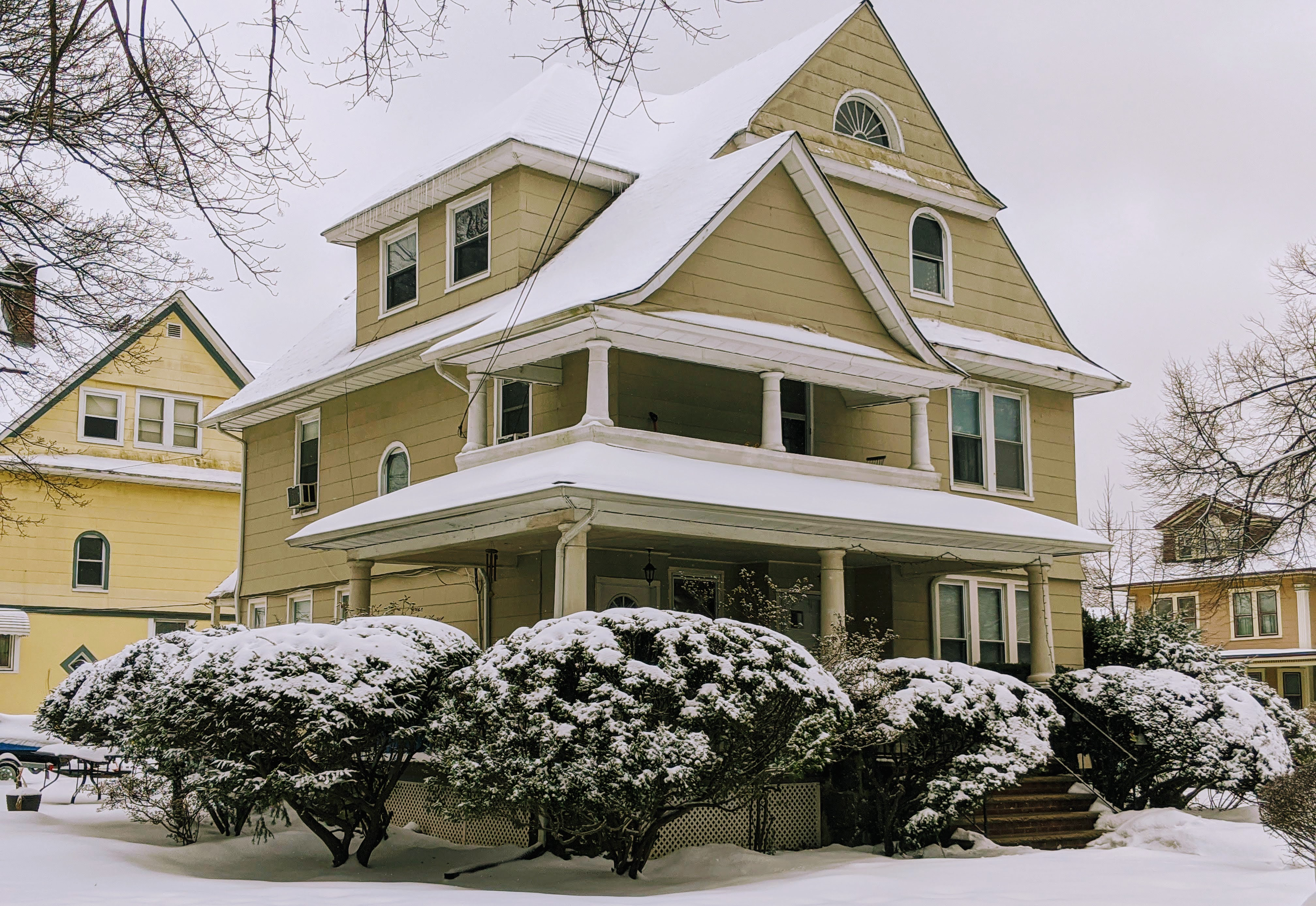
Contributing property NRHP

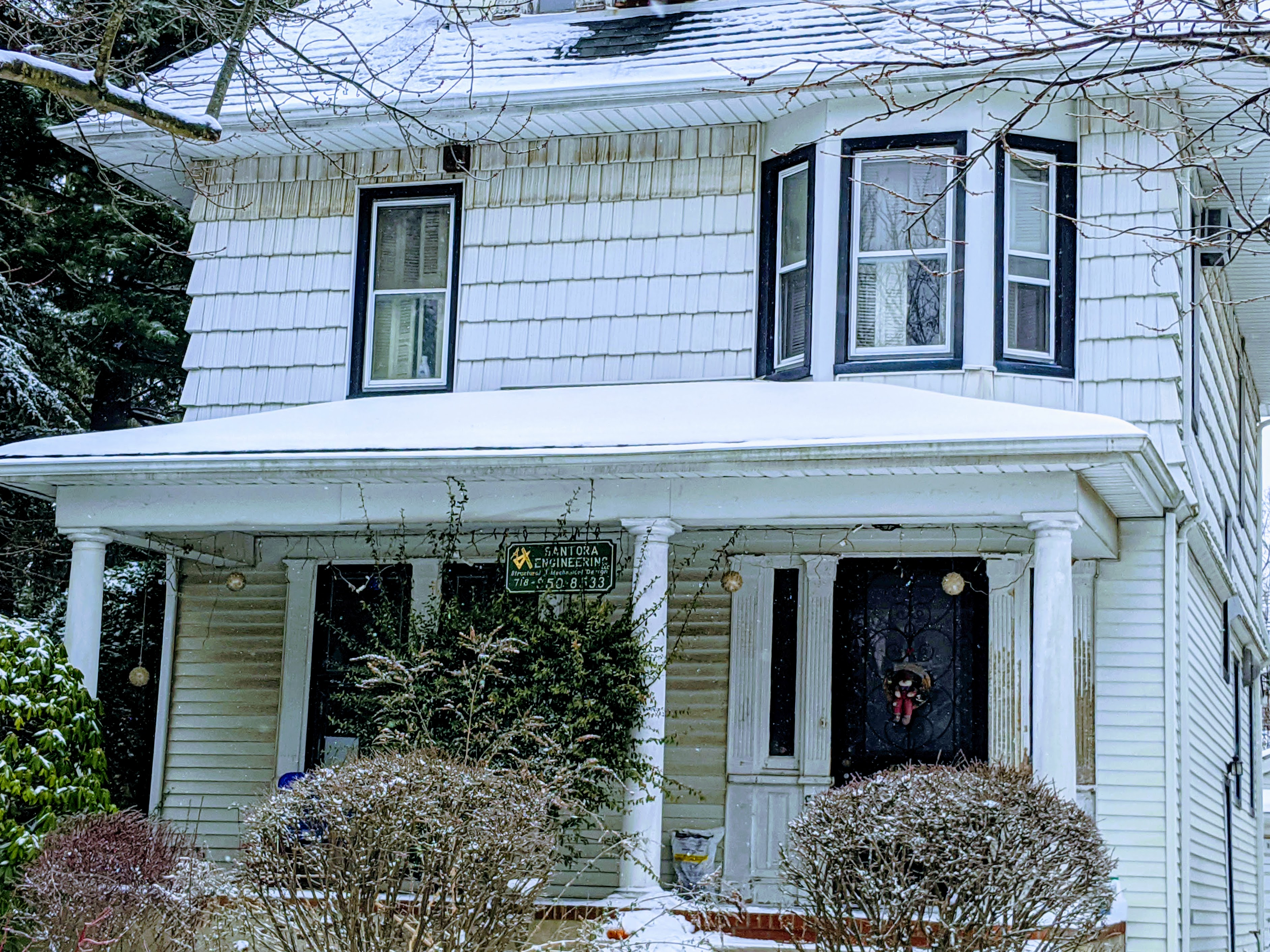
Contributing property NRHP

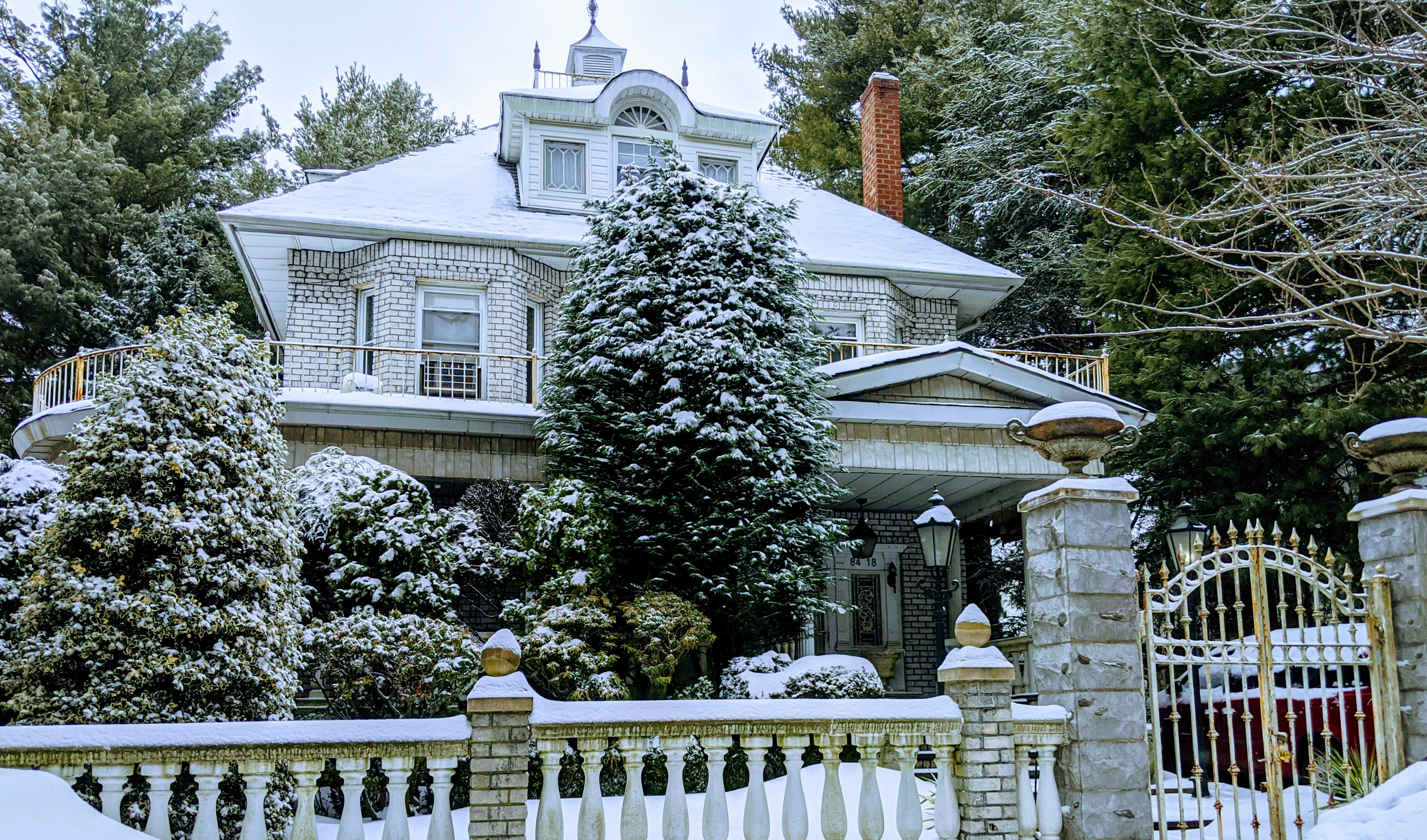
Contributing property NRHP

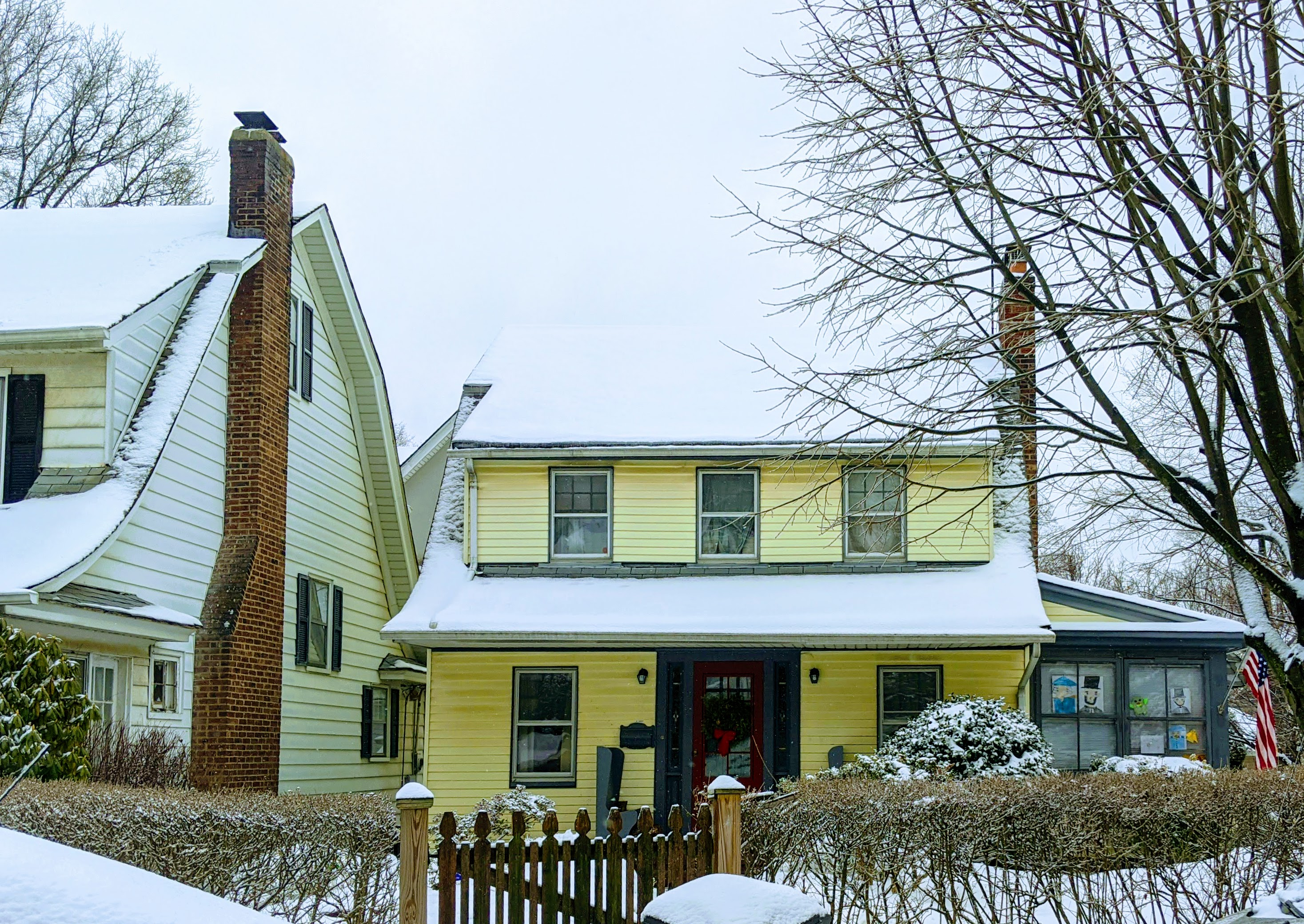
Contributing property NRHP

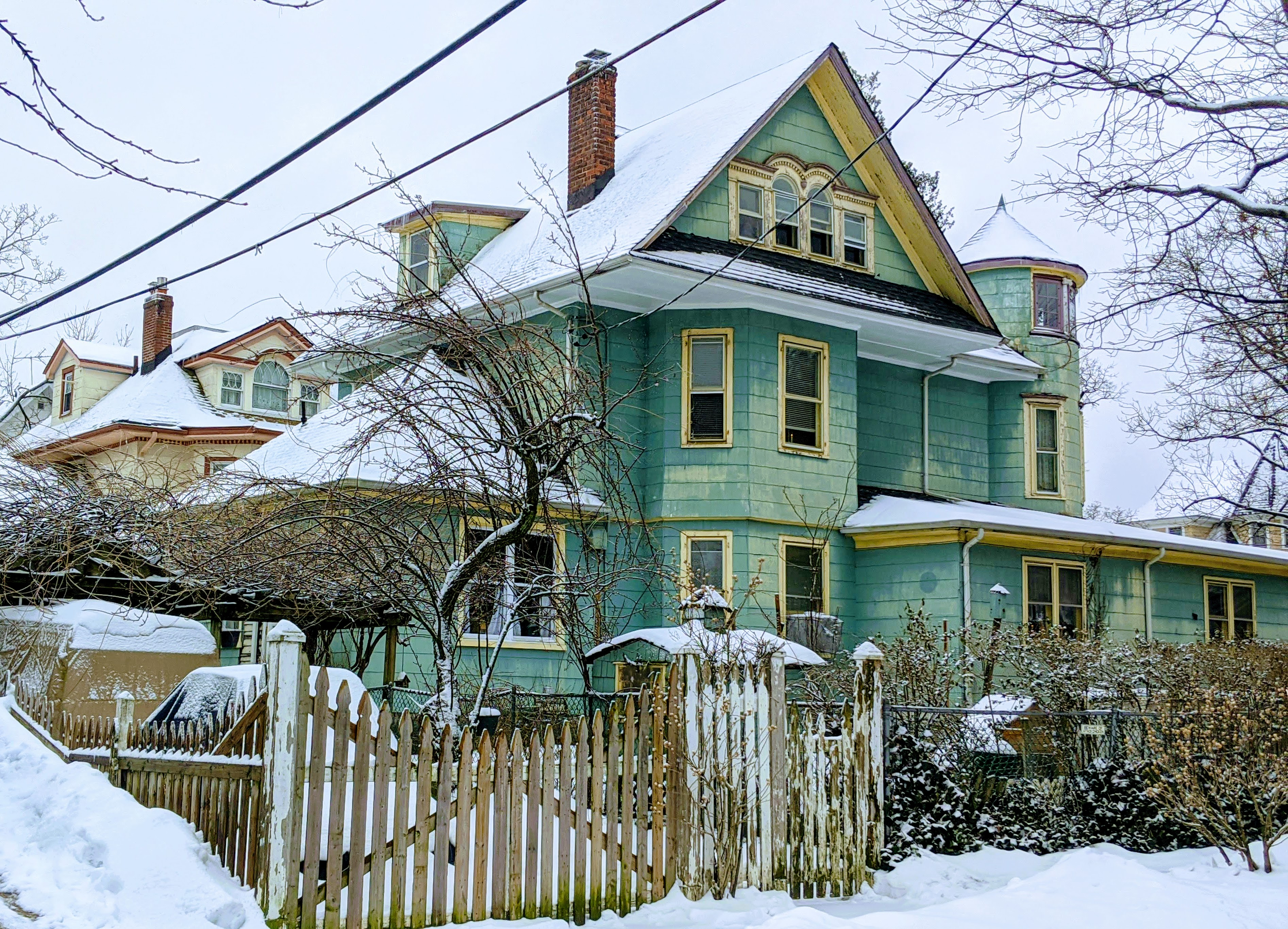
Richmond Hill Historic District Corner Turret home

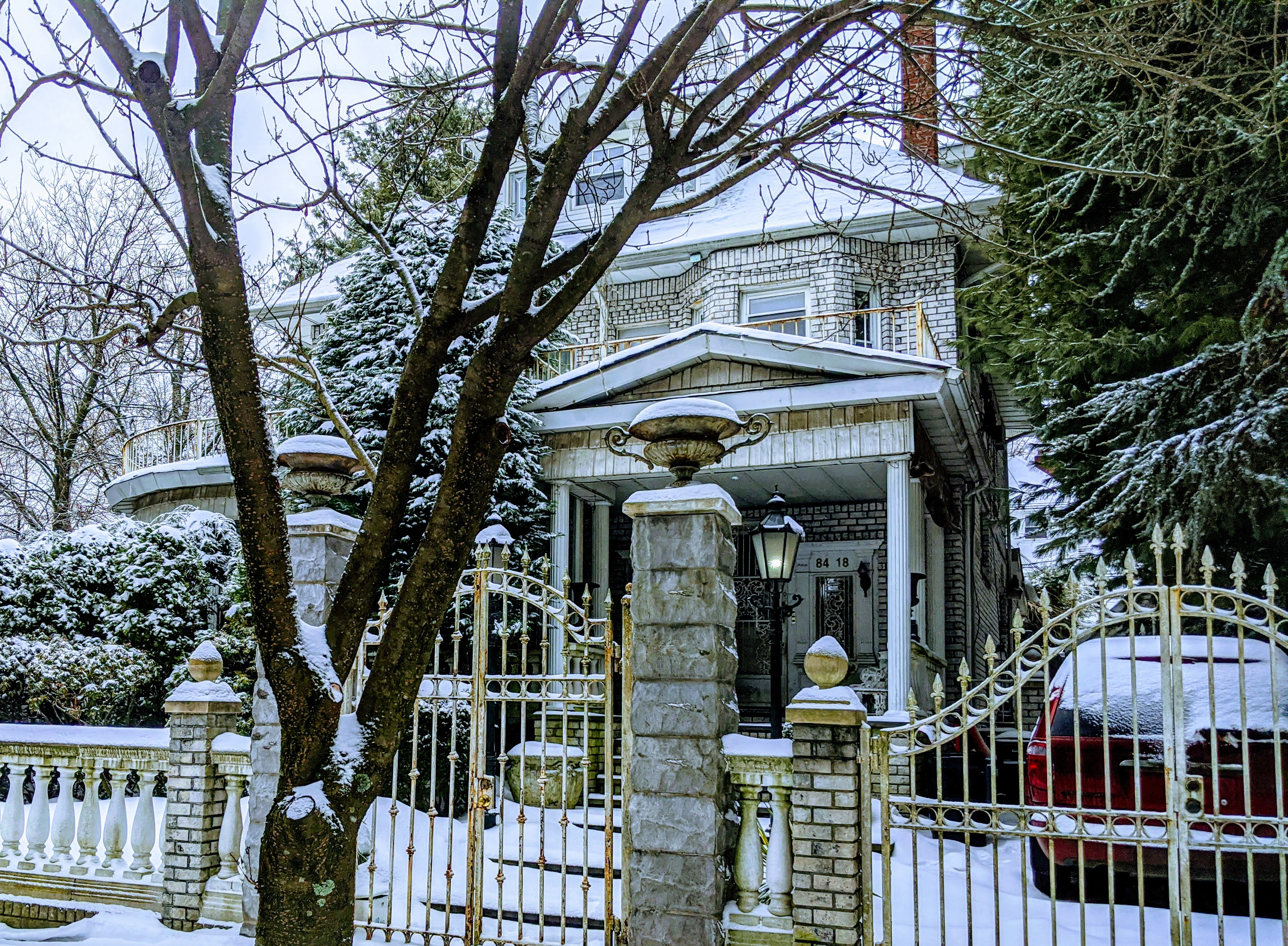
Richmond Hill Historic District

== See also ==
- List of New York City Designated Landmarks in Queens
- National Register of Historic Places listings in Queens County, New York
