= RKO Keith's Theater =

RKO Keith's Theater may refer to:

- RKO Keith's Theater (Richmond Hill, Queens), est. 1929
- RKO Keith's Theater (Flushing, Queens), est. 1928
- Boston Opera House (1980), est. 1928 as the RKO Keith's Theater in Boston

== See also ==
- RKO Boston Theatre, est. 1925, a different Boston theater operated by RKO
