= Richmond Hill, Queens =

Neighborhood in New York City

Coordinates: 40.695°N 73.83°W

Richmond Hill
- Neighborhood
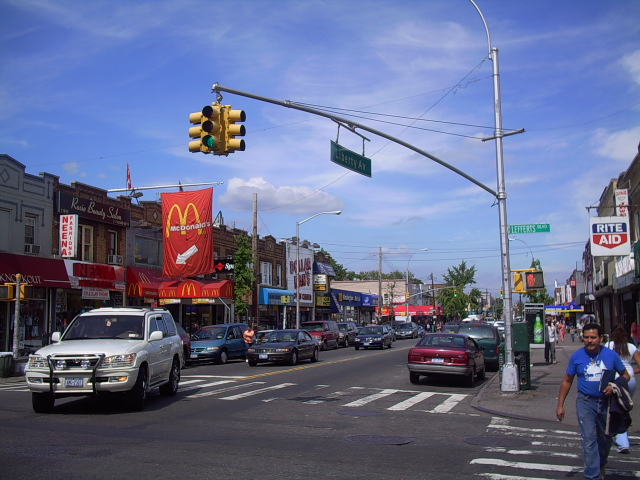
- Liberty Avenue intersecting with Lefferts Boulevard in Richmond Hill.
- Nicknames: Little Guyana; Little Punjab
- Location within New York City
- Country: United States
- State: New York
- City: New York City
- County/Borough: Queens
- Community District: Queens 9
- Founded: 1868
- Named for: Edward Richmond

Population (2010)
  - Total: 62,982

Race/Ethnicity
  - Hispanic and Latino: 36.0%
  - Asian: 27.4%
  - White: 11.2%
  - Black: 11.1%
  - Other: 14.4%

Economics
- Time zone: UTC– 05:00 (EST)
  - Summer (DST): UTC– 04:00 (EDT)
- ZIP Codes: 11418, 11419
- Area codes: 718, 347, 929, and 917

Richmond Hill is a commercial and residential neighborhood located in the southwestern section of the New York City borough of Queens. The area borders Kew Gardens and Forest Park to the north, Jamaica and South Jamaica to the east, South Ozone Park to the south, and Woodhaven and Ozone Park to the west. The neighborhood is split between Queens Community Board 9 and 10.

Main commercial streets in the neighborhood include Jamaica Avenue, Atlantic Avenue and Liberty Avenue. The portion of the neighborhood south of Atlantic Avenue is also known as South Richmond Hill. The Long Island Rail Road provides freight access via the Montauk Branch, which runs diagonally through the neighborhood from northwest to southeast. Many residents own homes, though some also rent within small apartment buildings.

South Richmond Hill is known as Little Guyana for its large Indo-Caribbean American (mostly Indo-Guyanese and some Indo-Trinidadians) population. It is also called Little Punjab due to its large Punjabi American (especially Sikh American) population. Richmond Hill is home to a density of Hindu, Roman Catholic, Eastern Orthodox, Protestant, Sikh, Jewish, and Muslim places of worship.

Richmond Hill is located in Queens Community District 9 and its ZIP Codes are 11418 and 11419. It is patrolled by the New York City Police Department's 102nd Precinct. Politically, Richmond Hill is represented by the New York City Council's 28th, 30th, and 32nd Districts.

== Geography ==
Richmond Hill is located between Kew Gardens and Forest Park to the north, Jamaica and South Jamaica to the east, South Ozone Park to the south, and Woodhaven and Ozone Park to the west. Hillside Avenue forms its northern boundary with Kew Gardens east of Lefferts Boulevard, while Forest Park and the right-of-way of the Long Island Rail Road (LIRR)'s Montauk Branch form its northern edge west of Lefferts. Its western boundary north of Atlantic Avenue is formed by the LIRR's abandoned Rockaway Beach Branch; south of Atlantic, the western border lies between 104th and 107th Streets. The southern border extends to around 103rd Avenue or Liberty Avenue. The Van Wyck Expressway abuts the eastern end of the community. The portion of the neighborhood south of Atlantic Avenue is also known as South Richmond Hill.

The area is well known for its large-frame single-family houses, many of which have been preserved since the turn of the 20th century. Many of the Queen Anne Victorian homes of old Richmond Hill still stand in the area today.

== History ==
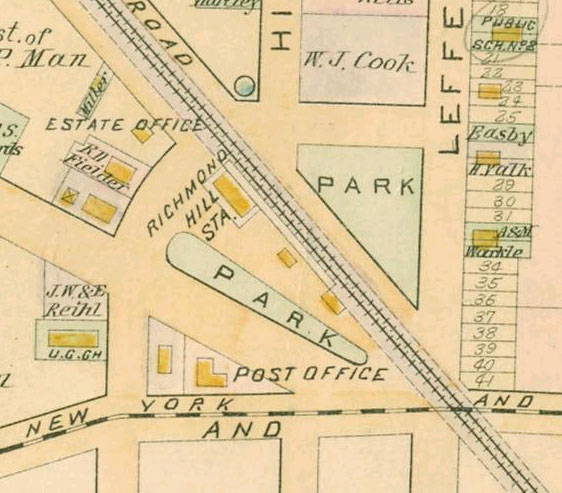
Development around railroad station, after two decades of operation, on an 1891 map

The hill referred to as Richmond Hill is a moraine created by debris and rocks collected while glaciers advanced down North America during the Wisconsin glaciation. Before European colonization the land was occupied by the Rockaway Native American group, for which the Rockaways were named. In 1660, the Welling family purchased land in what was then the western portion of the colonial town of Rustdorp. The land would become the Welling Farm, while Rustdorp would be renamed Jamaica under British rule in 1664. The Battle of Long Island, one of the bloodiest battles of the Revolutionary War, was fought in 1776 along the ridge in present-day Forest Park, near what is now the golf course clubhouse. Protected by its thickly-wooded area, American riflemen used guerrilla warfare tactics to attack and defeat the advancing Hessians. One of the sites that would make up modern Richmond Hill, Lefferts Farm, was said to be the site of a Revolutionary War battle. Clarenceville, a farming community, was established in January 1853 on the south side of Jamaica Avenue between 110th and 112th Streets on land purchased from the Welling estate.

Richmond Hill's name was inspired either by a suburban town near London or by Edward Richmond, a landscape architect in the mid-19th century who designed much of the neighborhood. In 1868, Albon Platt Man, a successful Manhattan lawyer, purchased the Lefferts, Welling, and Bergen farms along with other plots amounting to 400 acres of land, and hired Richmond to lay out the community. The tract extended as far north as White Pot Road (now Kew Gardens Road) near modern Queens Boulevard. The area reminded Man of the London suburb, where his family resided. Man's sons would later found the nearby Kew Gardens neighborhood from the northern portion of the land.

Streets, schools, a church, and a railroad were built in Richmond Hill over the next decade, thus making the area one of the earliest residential communities on Long Island. The streets were laid down to match the geography of the area. The development of area was facilitated by the opening of two railroad stations. These were the Clarenceville station on the Brooklyn and Jamaica Railroad, at Atlantic Avenue and Greenwood Avenue (now 111th Street); and the Richmond Hill station at Park Street (now Hillside Avenue) near Jamaica and Lefferts Avenues on the Montauk railroad line between Long Island City and eastern Long Island. By 1872, a post office was established in the neighborhood, while the Clarenceville neighborhood was merged into Richmond Hill. Richmond Hill was incorporated as an independent village in 1894, by which time it had also absorbed the Morris Park neighborhood, which had been established in 1885. In 1898, Richmond Hill and the rest of Queens county were consolidated into the City of Greater New York.

The New York City Subway's BMT Fulton Street Line was extended east along Liberty Avenue into the area on September 25, 1915, terminating at Lefferts Avenue (now Lefferts Boulevard). It is now the southern terminal of the A train. The area received further development when the BMT Jamaica Line elevated, now served by the New York City Subway's J and Z trains, was extended east into the neighborhood at Greenwood Avenue (now 111th Street) on May 28, 1917. As the neighborhood's population continued to grow into the 1920s, smaller closely spaced houses and apartment buildings began to replace large private houses.

== Demographics ==
Based on data from the 2010 United States census, the population of Richmond Hill was 62,982, a decrease of 3 (0.0%) from the 62,985 counted in 2000. Covering an area of 1,171.55 acres (474.11 ha), the neighborhood had a population density of 53.8 inhabitants per acre (34,400/sq mi; 13,300/km^{2}).

The racial makeup of the neighborhood was 11.2% (7,078) White, 11.1% (6,960) African American, 1.0% (657) Native American, 27.4% (17,252) Asian, 0.2% (116) Pacific Islander, 6.6% (4,139) from other races, and 6.6% (4,136) from two or more races. Hispanic or Latino of any race were 36.0% (22,644) of the population.

The entirety of Community Board 9, which comprises Kew Gardens, Richmond Hill, and Woodhaven, had 148,465 inhabitants as of NYC Health's 2018 Community Health Profile, with an average life expectancy of 84.3 years. This is higher than the median life expectancy of 81.2 for all New York City neighborhoods. Most inhabitants are youth and middle-aged adults: 22% are between the ages of between 0–17, 30% between 25 and 44, and 27% between 45 and 64. The ratio of college-aged and elderly residents was lower, at 17% and 7% respectively.

As of 2017, the median household income in Community Board 9 was $69,916. In 2018, an estimated 22% of Richmond Hill and Kew Gardens residents lived in poverty, compared to 19% in all of Queens and 20% in all of New York City. One in twelve residents (8%) were unemployed, compared to 8% in Queens and 9% in New York City. Rent burden, or the percentage of residents who have difficulty paying their rent, is 55% in Richmond Hill and Kew Gardens, higher than the boroughwide and citywide rates of 53% and 51% respectively. Based on this calculation, as of 2018, Richmond Hill and Kew Gardens are considered to be high-income relative to the rest of the city and not gentrifying.

=== Demographic changes ===
Originally, many European (Italian, Dutch, English, Irish, Scots, Danish, and German) and Jewish families lived in Richmond Hill. In the 1970s, the neighborhood was predominantly Hispanic. Today, the south side of Richmond Hill consists mostly of South Asian Americans (Indians, Pakistanis, and Bangladeshis) and Indo-Caribbean Americans (Indo-Guyanese, Indo-Trinidadians, Indo-Surinamese, and Indo-Jamaicans), who have steadily emigrated to the United States since the 1960s. A portion of Liberty Avenue has also been officially been renamed Little Guyana. Richmond Hill also has the largest Sikh population in the city, and 101st Avenue has evolved into "Little Punjab", or Punjab Avenue, has emerged in Richmond Hill, Queens.

== Points of interest ==
The Triangle Hofbrau, opened as a hotel in 1893 and as a restaurant in 1893, was a restaurant which was frequented by such stars as Mae West in the 1920s and 1930s. It sat on the triangular piece of land bordered by Hillside Avenue, Jamaica Avenue, and Myrtle Avenue. The building has since been converted to medical offices. Near the northwest corner of Hillside Avenue and Myrtle Avenue sat an old time ice cream parlor, Jahn's. It closed in late 2007. Between Myrtle Avenue and the Montauk Line railroad is a former movie theatre, RKO Keith's Richmond Hill Theater, opened in 1929, functioning since 1968 as a bingo hall. These and several other landmarks are located in the vicinity of the "Richmond Hill Triangle", bracketed by Jamaica Avenue, Myrtle Avenue, and 117th Street. This was historically the commercial center of Richmond Hill. The intersection of Jamaica and Myrtle Avenues is also known as James J. Creegan Square.

The northern edge of Richmond Hill contains the Church of the Resurrection. This Episcopalian church is an 1874 structure and is the oldest house of worship in Richmond Hill. It was placed in the National Register of Historic Places in 2003. Also listed on the National Register of Historic Places are Public School 66 and Saint Benedict Joseph Labre Parish.

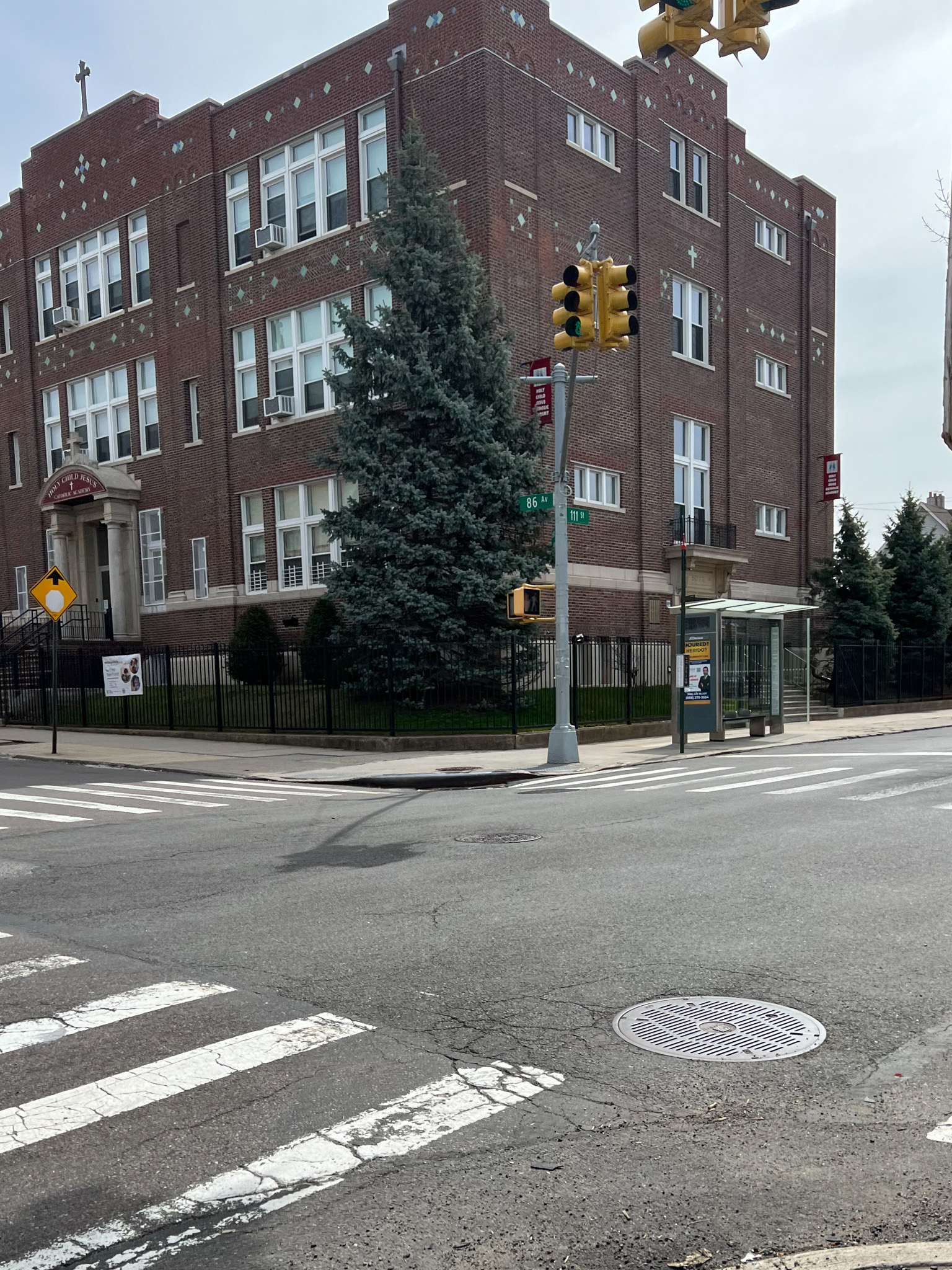
Felix Cuervo corner

The southeast corner of 86th Avenue and 111th Street in Richmond Hill is designated Felix Cuervo Corner. Cuervo was an elevator operator who campaigned for elevator safety and other maintenance issues in high rise buildings.

== Police and crime ==
Kew Gardens, Richmond Hill, and Woodhaven are patrolled by the 102nd Precinct of the NYPD, located at 87–34 118th Street. The 102nd Precinct ranked 22nd safest out of 69 patrol areas for per-capita crime in 2010. As of 2018, with a non-fatal assault rate of 43 per 100,000 people, Richmond Hill and Kew Gardens's rate of violent crimes per capita is less than that of the city as a whole. The incarceration rate of 345 per 100,000 people is lower than that of the city as a whole.

The 102nd Precinct has a lower crime rate than in the 1990s, with crimes across all categories having decreased by 90.2% between 1990 and 2018. The precinct reported 2 murders, 24 rapes, 101 robberies, 184 felony assaults, 104 burglaries, 285 grand larcenies, and 99 grand larcenies auto in 2018.

== Fire safety ==
Richmond Hill contains three New York City Fire Department (FDNY) fire stations:

- Engine Co. 285/Ladder Co. 142 – 103-17 98th Street
- Engine Co. 294/Ladder Co. 143 – 101-02 Jamaica Avenue
- Squad 270/Division 13 – 91-45 121st Street

== Health ==
As of 2018, preterm births are more common in Richmond Hill and Kew Gardens than in other places citywide, though births to teenage mothers are less common. In Richmond Hill and Kew Gardens, there were 92 preterm births per 1,000 live births (compared to 87 per 1,000 citywide), and 15.7 births to teenage mothers per 1,000 live births (compared to 19.3 per 1,000 citywide). Richmond Hill and Kew Gardens have a higher than average population of residents who are uninsured. In 2018, this population of uninsured residents was estimated to be 14%, slightly higher than the citywide rate of 12%.

The concentration of fine particulate matter, the deadliest type of air pollutant, in Richmond Hill and Kew Gardens is 0.0073 milligrams per cubic metre (7.3×10^{−9} oz/ft^{3}), less than the city average. Eleven percent of Richmond Hill and Kew Gardens residents are smokers, which is lower than the city average of 14% of residents being smokers. In Richmond Hill and Kew Gardens, 23% of residents are obese, 14% are diabetic, and 22% have high blood pressure—compared to the citywide averages of 22%, 8%, and 23% respectively. In addition, 22% of children are obese, compared to the citywide average of 20%.

Eighty-six percent of residents eat some fruits and vegetables every day, which is about the same as the city's average of 87%. In 2018, 78% of residents described their health as "good", "very good", or "excellent", equal to the city's average of 78%. For every supermarket in Richmond Hill and Kew Gardens, there are 11 bodegas.

The nearest major hospitals are Long Island Jewish Forest Hills and Jamaica Hospital.

== Post offices and ZIP Codes ==
Richmond Hill is covered by the ZIP Code 11418 as well as parts of 11416, 11419, and 11421. The United States Post Office operates two post offices nearby:

- South Richmond Hill Station – 117-04 101st Avenue
- Richmond Hill Station – 122-01 Jamaica Avenue

== Parks and recreation ==
- Forest Park, located at the north edge of the neighborhood.
- Jacob Riis Triangle
- Lt. Frank McConnell Memorial Park
- Phil "Scooter" Rizzuto Park, formerly Smokey Oval Park, at Atlantic Avenue between 125th and 127th Streets. The name "Smokey Oval" referred to the smoke from the adjacent Morris Park Facility of the Long Island Rail Road. In June 2008 was named after New York Yankees player and broadcaster Phil Rizzuto, who played baseball at nearby Richmond Hill High School.

== Education ==
Richmond Hill and Kew Gardens generally have a lower rate of college-educated residents than the rest of the city as of 2018. While 34% of residents age 25 and older have a college education or higher, 22% have less than a high school education and 43% are high school graduates or have some college education. By contrast, 39% of Queens residents and 43% of city residents have a college education or higher. The percentage of Richmond Hill and Kew Gardens students excelling in math rose from 34% in 2000 to 61% in 2011, and reading achievement rose from 39% to 48% during the same time period.

Richmond Hill and Kew Gardens's rate of elementary school student absenteeism is less than the rest of New York City. In Richmond Hill and Kew Gardens, 17% of elementary school students missed twenty or more days per school year, lower than the citywide average of 20%. Additionally, 79% of high school students in Richmond Hill and Kew Gardens graduate on time, more than the citywide average of 75%.

=== Schools ===
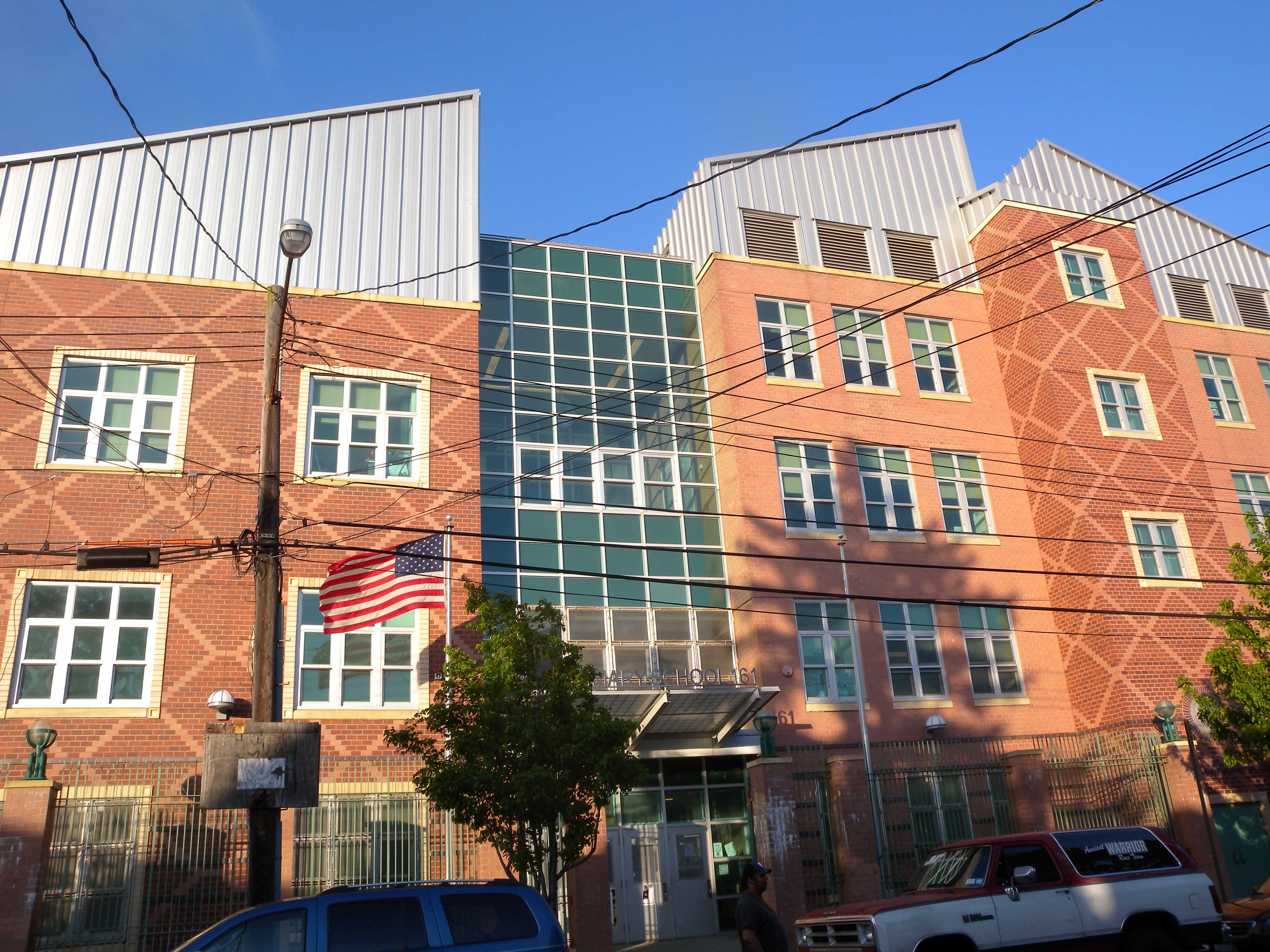
PS 161

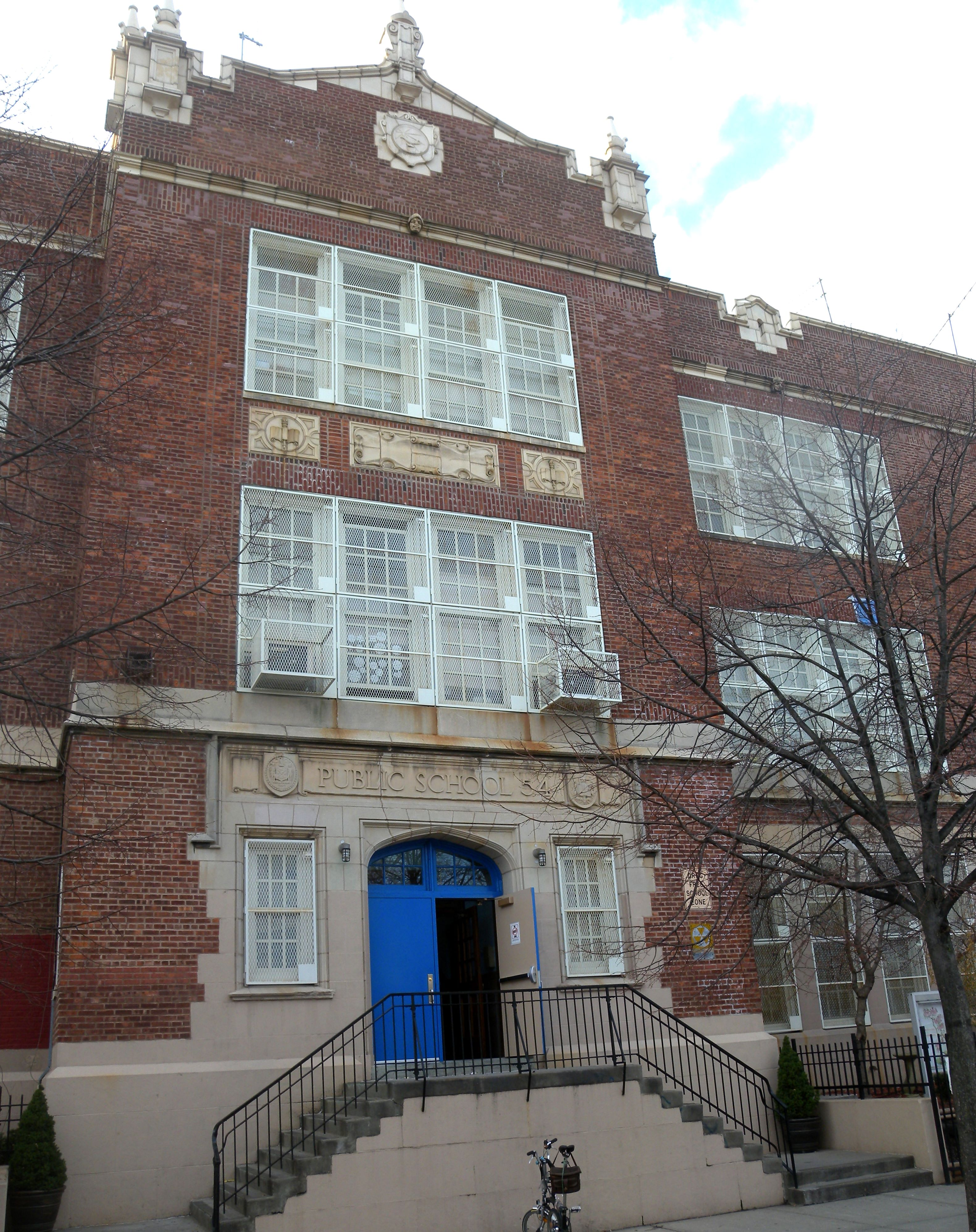
PS 54

==== Public schools ====
Public schools in Richmond Hill are operated by the New York City Department of Education.

All of the following public elementary schools serve grades PK-5 unless otherwise noted.

- PS 51 (grades PK-1)
- PS 54 Hillside Avenue School
- PS 55 The Maure School (grades K-5)
- PS 56 Harry Eichler School (grades 2–5)
- PS 62 Chester Park School
- PS 66 Jacqueline Kennedy Onassis School, a New York City Landmark.
- PS 90 Horace Mann School
- PS 161 Arthur R. Ashe Junior School

Residents are zoned to MS 72 and MS 217 in Briarwood, and MS 137 in Ozone Park. Students also attend other middle schools and high schools in the city.

Richmond Hill High School is located in the neighborhood. Until June 2012, the city had planned to close the high school. The city had slated the school to close; however, a court ruling prevented the school's closure. Richmond Hill High School is the zoned school for Richmond Hill Residents, while some living towards the east of Richmond Hill has Hillcrest High School as their zoned school.

==== Private schools ====
Private schools include:

- Bethlehem Christian Academy
- Hebrew Academy-West Queens
- Holy Child Jesus Academy Holy Child Jesus School
- Islamic Elementary School
- Theatre Street School

=== Libraries ===
The Queens Public Library operates two branches in Richmond Hill:

- The Richmond Hill branch at 118–14 Hillside Avenue
- The Lefferts branch at 103–34 Lefferts Boulevard

== Transportation ==
Richmond Hill is served by several New York City Subway stations. The J and Z trains stops at 121st Street and 104th Street, and the J train stops at 111th Street. The Jamaica–Van Wyck station on the E train, and the 111th Street and Ozone Park–Lefferts Boulevard stations on the A train, are also located in Richmond Hill.

There was a Long Island Rail Road station named Richmond Hill on Hillside Avenue and Babbage Street along the Montauk Branch. However, this station was closed in 1998 due to low ridership (this station had just one daily rider at the time of its closure). The station and platform remain, though access via the staircase at Jamaica Avenue is gated off. Today the Kew Gardens and Jamaica stations serve the area.

The area is also served by MTA Regional Bus Operations routes. These include the Q8, Q9, Q10, Q24, Q37, Q54, Q55, Q56, Q80 and Q112 local buses, as well as the QM18 express bus to Manhattan.

== Notable residents ==
- Robert Angeloch (1922–2011), artist who was co-founder of the Woodstock School of Art
- Joseph Baldi, serial killer known as “The Queens Creeper”
- Amelia Edith Huddleston Barr (1831–1919), author of the book Jan Vedder's Wife and an advocate of women's rights
- Gary Barnett (born c. 1956), President and founder of Extell Development Company
- Karen Berg (1942–2020), author and founder of the Kabbalah Centre
- Sal Butera (born 1952), former professional baseball catcher
- Jack Cassidy (1927–1976), Broadway and television actor was born and raised in Richmond Hill
- Percy Crosby (1891–1964), creator of the comic Skippy
- Danny Fields (born 1939), music manager, publicist, journalist and author, who was an influential figure in punk rock
- Morton Gould (1913–1996), composer, conductor, arranger, and pianist
- Alfred H. Grebe (1895–1935), pioneer in radio broadcasting
- Seymour Halpern (1913–1997), politician who represented Queens in the United States House of Representatives from 1959 to 1973
- William Hickey (1927–1997), actor and voice actor best known for playing Don Corrado Prizzi in the film Prizzi's Honor
- Frank Kameny (1925–2011), LGBT rights activist
- Jack Kerouac (1922–1969), novelist and poet who lived in Richmond Hill from 1950 to 1955
- Wilbur Knorr (1945–1997), historian of mathematics and a professor in the departments of philosophy and classics at Stanford University
- Jack Lord (1920–1998), actor best known for portraying Lt. Steve McGarrett on Hawaii Five-O
- Jack Maple (1952–2001), former deputy commissioner of New York City Police Department and architect of the CompStat system
- Marx Brothers – Family comedy act
- Anaïs Nin (1923–1977), French-Cuban author of The Delta of Venus and diarist, who lived in Richmond Hill prior to moving to Paris in 1924
- Jacob Riis (1849–1914), documentary journalist/author, photographer and reformer was a Richmond Hill resident
- Phil Rizzuto (1917–2007), Yankees Hall of Fame Baseball Player who lived and went to high school in Richmond Hill. Phil "Scooter" Rizzuto Park in the neighborhood is named after him
- Bob Sheppard (1910–2010), public address announcer for the New York Yankees and New York Giants
- Joe Solomon (1930–2023), West Indian cricketer notable for the Tied Test Match
- Robin Tewes (born 1950), painter, born and raised in Richmond Hill
- Dick Van Patten (1928–2015), actor, raised in Richmond Hill
