= PS 66 =

- Public School 66
- U.S. National Register of Historic Places
- New York City Landmark
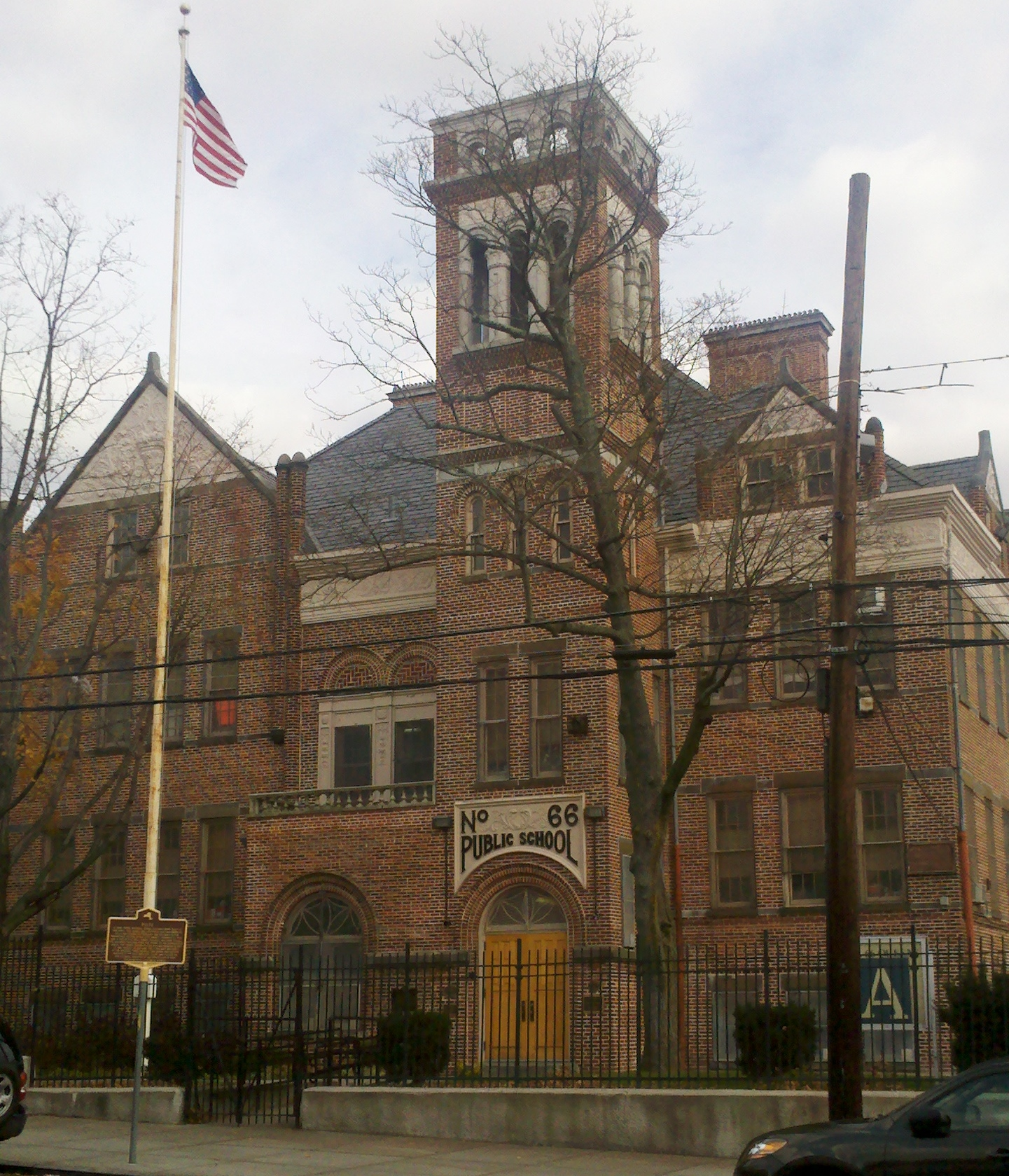
- PS 66 Queens, November 2012
- Location: 85-11 102nd St., Richmond Hill, New York
- Coordinates: 40°41′52″N 73°50′47″W
- Area: less than one acre
- Built: 1898
- Architect: Snyder, CBJ; Board of Education, Union Free
- Architectural style: Romanesque
- NRHP reference No.: 03000850
- NYCL No.: 2317

Significant dates
- Added to NRHP: August 28, 2003
- Designated NYCL: January 12, 2010

P.S. 66 Jacqueline Kennedy Onassis School, formally known as Brooklyn Hills School, is a historic school building in Richmond Hill, Queens, New York. It was designed by architect C. B. J. Snyder (1860–1945) and built in 1898. It is a 2 1/2-story brick structure in the Romanesque style. It has a prominent, off-center tower with belfry. It features a slate roof and decorative stucco frieze. The school has a fortress-like appearance, including prominent round arches highlighting window openings, and a distinctive six-story tower. The building was restored in 2001 and remains in use as a New York City Public School.

P.S. 66 is also a relic from the time when Richmond Hill was a farming community, and was transitioning into an urban residential neighborhood.

It was listed on the National Register of Historic Places in 2003. In 2008, Caroline Kennedy petitioned the New York City Council to make P.S. 66 into a New York City designated landmark. It was listed as a New York City landmark in 2010.

== See also ==
- List of New York City Designated Landmarks in Queens
- National Register of Historic Places listings in Queens County, New York
