= Church of the Resurrection (Queens) =

Episcopal church in New York City

- U.S. National Register of Historic Places
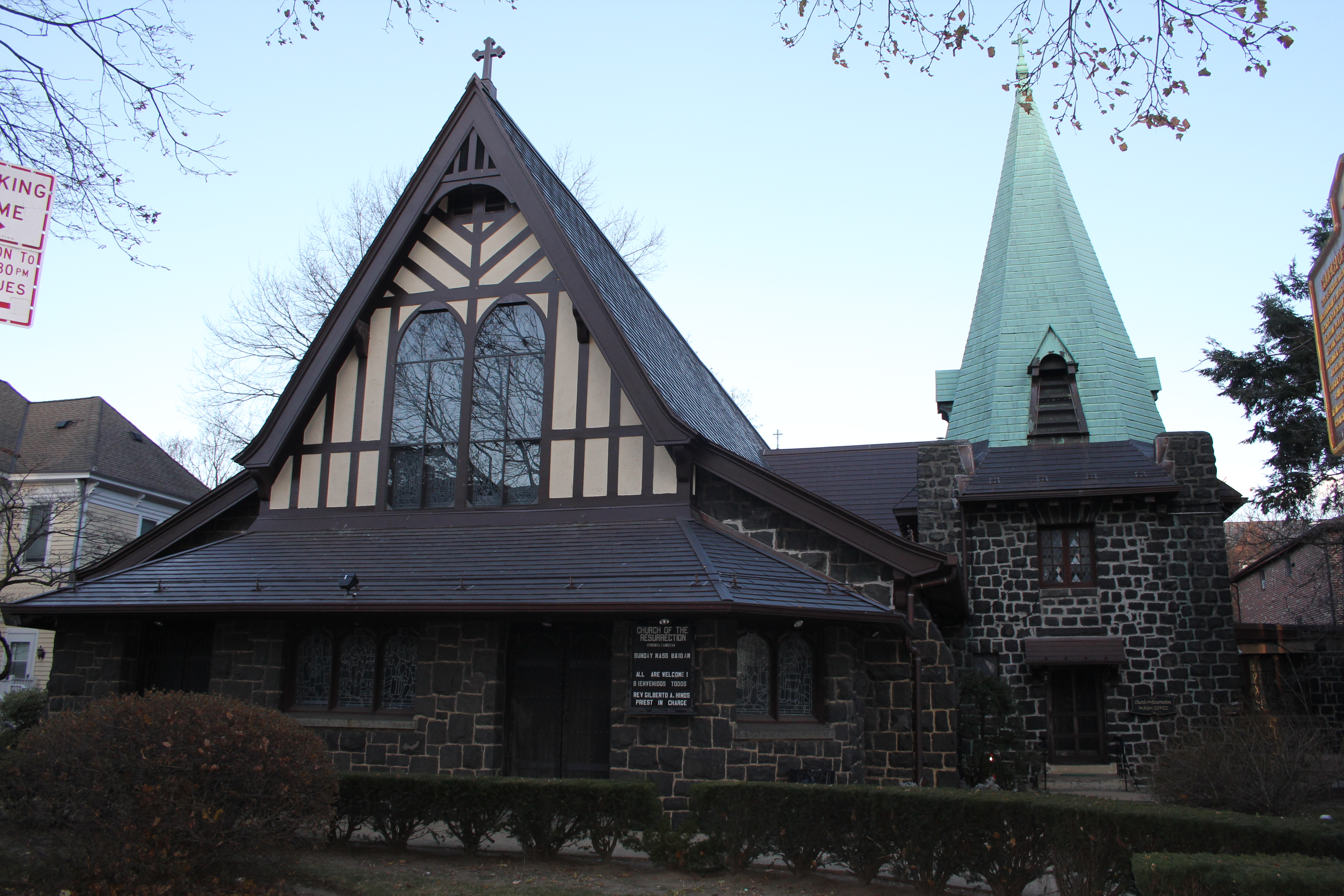
- Church building with tower

- Location within New York City Location within New York Location within the United States
- Location: 85-09 118th St., Kew Gardens, Queens
- Coordinates: 40°42′8.2476″N 73°49′56.7114″W
- Area: less than one acre
- Built: 1904
- Architect: Vickers, Nathaniel W.
- Architectural style: Queen Anne, Tudor Revival
- NRHP reference No.: 03000090
- Added to NRHP: March 7, 2003

The Church of the Resurrection is a historic Episcopal church and rectory in Richmond Hill, Queens, New York City. It was originally built in 1874 as a frame, Gothic Revival style church. It was extensively remodeled and enlarged in 1904 in the Late Gothic / Tudor Revival style. It has an exterior of random quarry-faced stone and a prominent bell tower with spire. The church includes the Riis family memorial window, donated in 1905 by Elizabeth Riis, wife of Jacob Riis. The adjacent Cummings Hall was built in 1923. The rectory was built in 1888 and is a 2 1/2-story, frame dwelling with a hipped roof and gable dormers in the Queen Anne style.

The church is also notable for its association with Jacob Riis, a social reformer and pioneering photojournalist who was a Richmond Hill resident from 1885 to 1912 and a church member from 1900 to 1912. Theodore Roosevelt, a close friend and associate of Riis, visited the church to attend the marriage of Riis's daughter Clara to Dr. William Fiske on June 1, 1900. Roosevelt was Governor of New York at the time.

It was listed on the National Register of Historic Places in 2003.

== Gallery ==
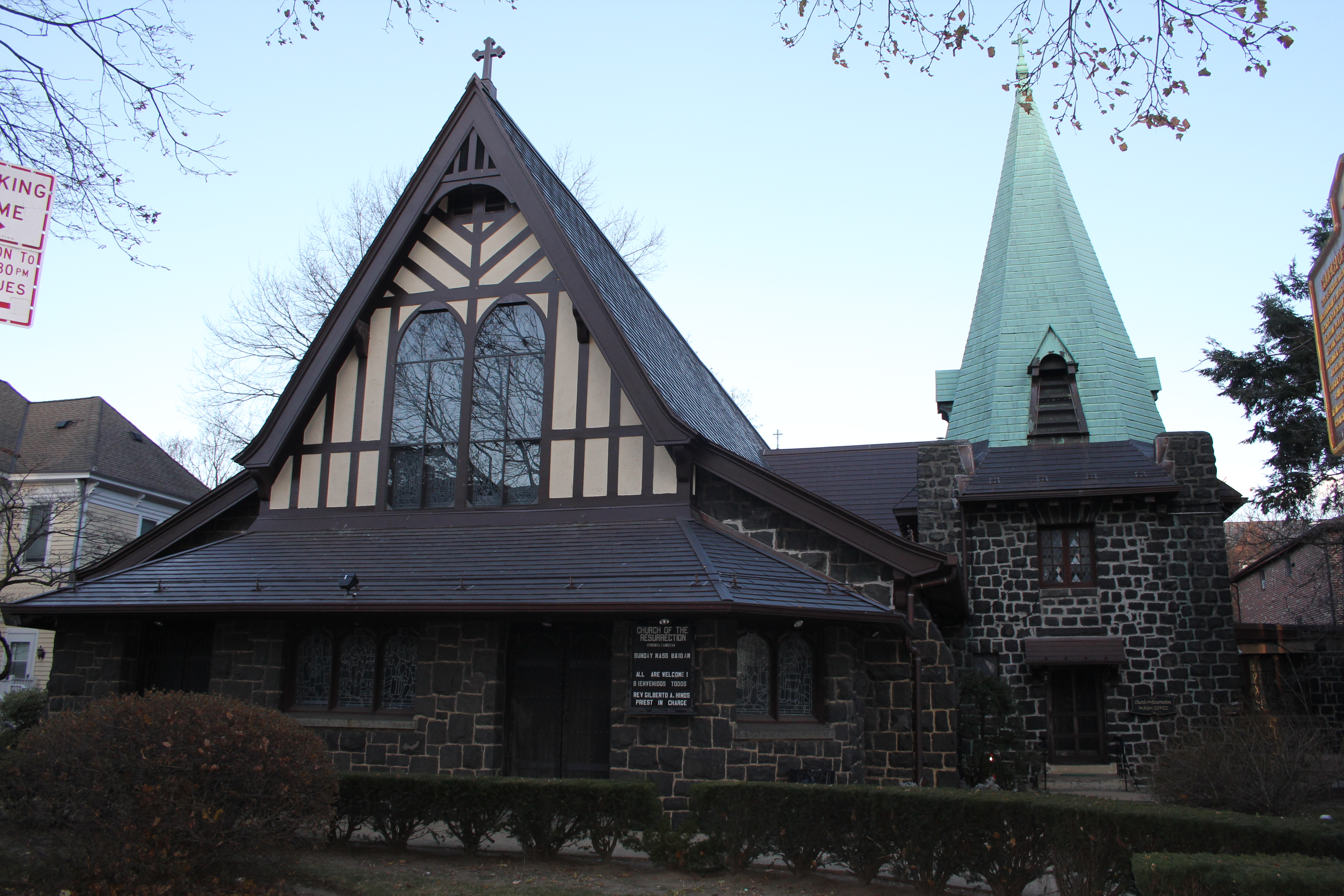
Church building with tower

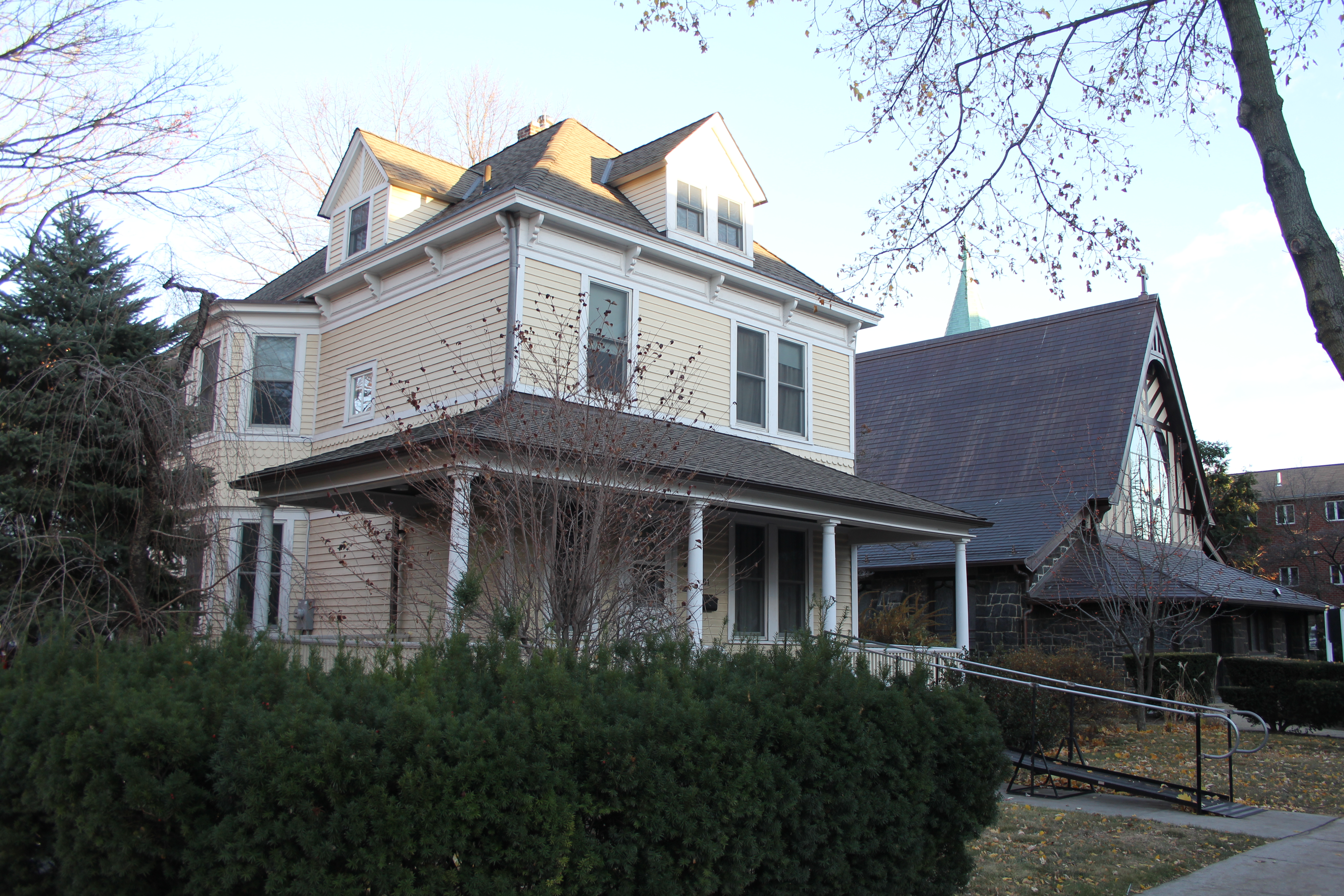
Rectory built in 1888

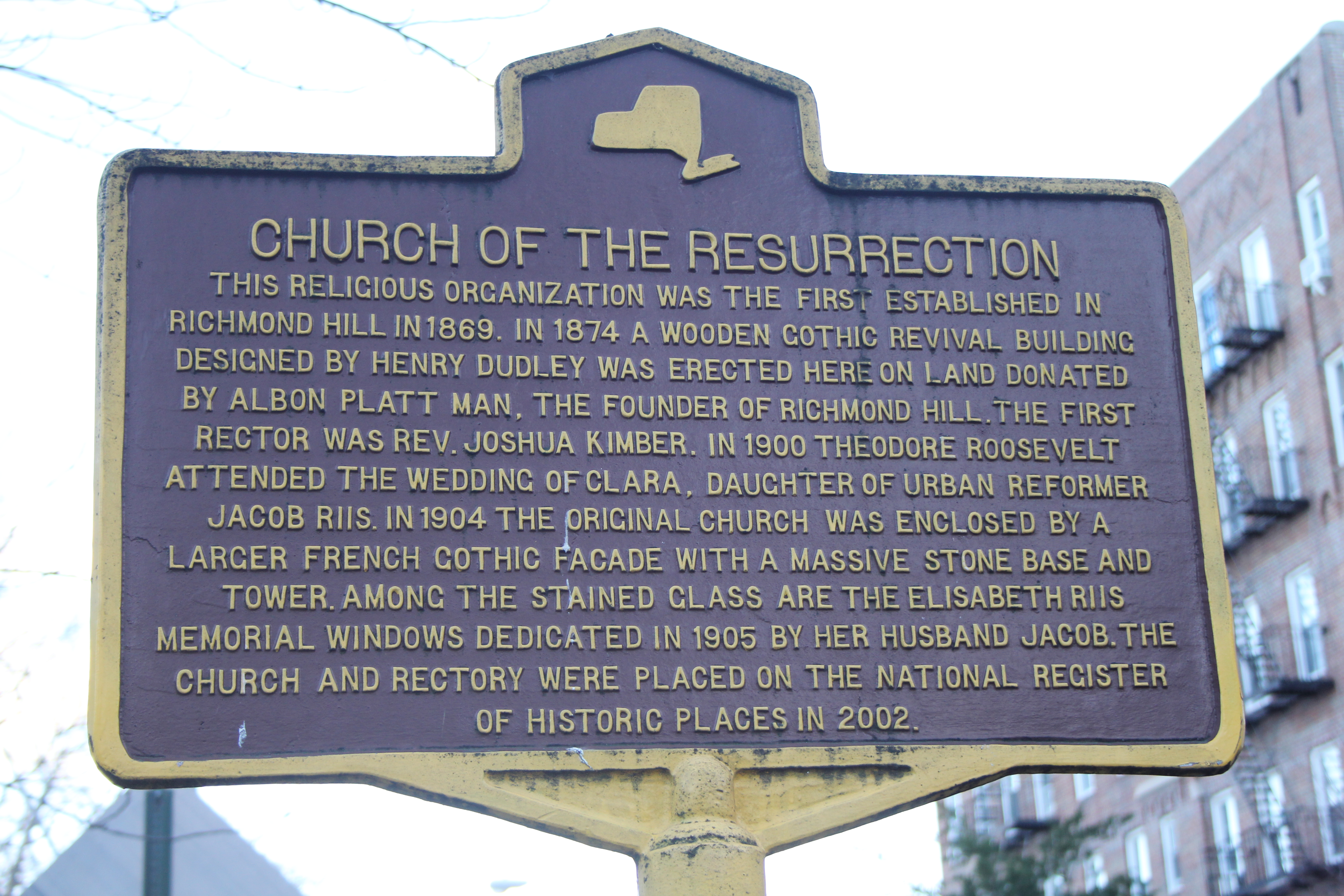
Historic marker
