= Jahn's =

Coordinates: 40.74946°N 73.88501°W

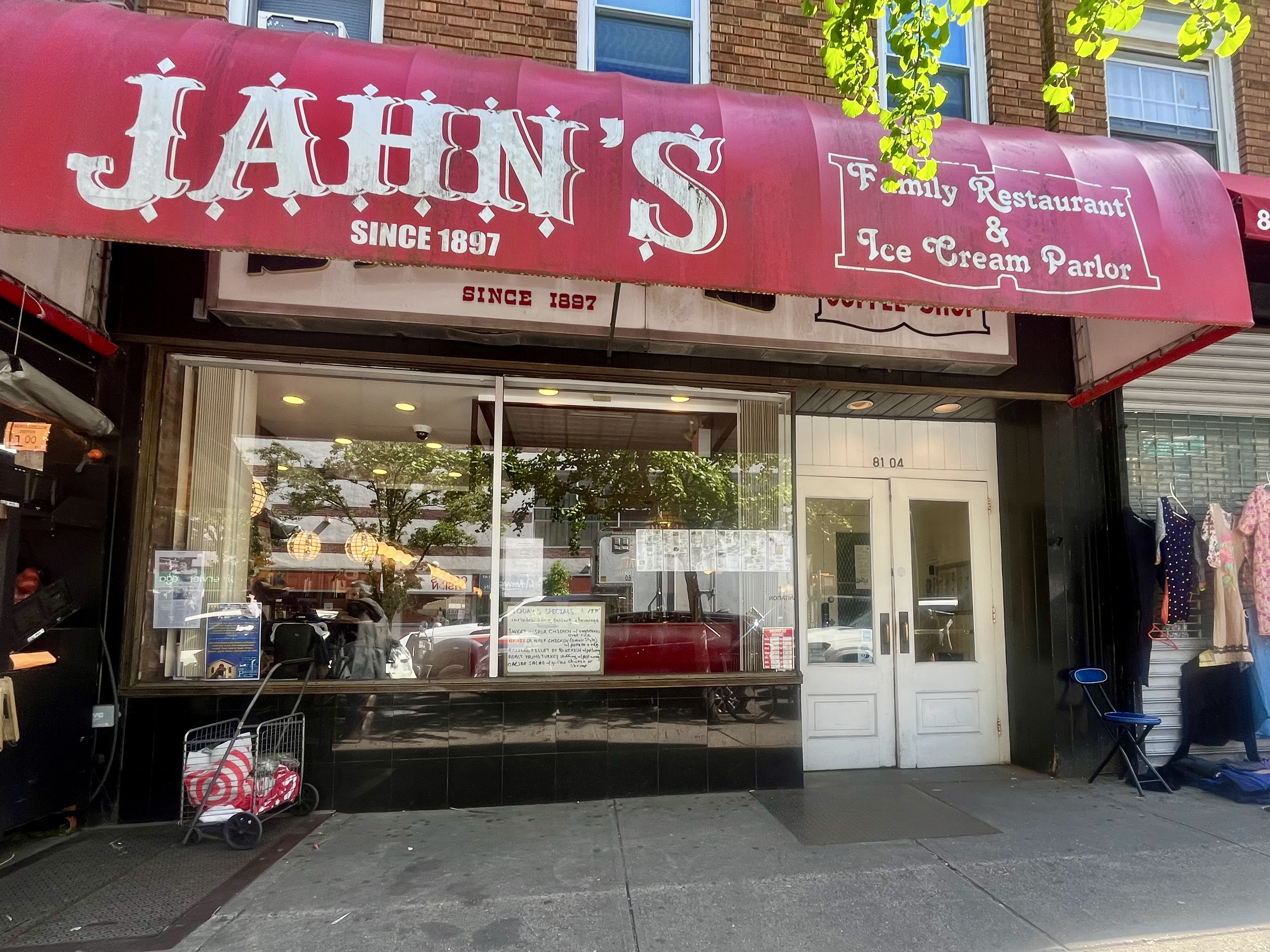
- Exterior of Jackson Heights location in 2025
- Interactive map of Jahn's

Restaurant information
- Food type: Ice cream
- Location: New York, United States

Jahn's Family Restaurant and Ice Cream Parlor was an old-fashioned ice cream parlor and restaurant with locations in the New York City area and Miami-Dade County, Florida, and was famous for its huge Kitchen Sink Sundae. Only the Jahn's located in Jackson Heights, Queens is still operating.

== Locations ==
The first location was opened in 1897 by John Jahn at 138th Street and Alexander Avenue in the Mott Haven section of the Bronx. By 1918, he took off for 5 years and let his children, Elsie, Frank, and Howard, mind the store. Later, he opened three more restaurants: one for Elsie in Jamaica, one for Frank in Richmond Hill, and one for Howard in Flushing. By the 1950s, there were Jahn's locations across Brooklyn with the most popular in Flatbush, and others in Marine Park, Bay Ridge, Sheepshead Bay, the Fordham section of the Bronx, the Kingsbridge section of the Bronx, Jackson Heights, Forest Hills, Bayside, Queens, Eastchester, East Meadow, West Islip, Great Neck, Williston Park, Rockville Centre, Cedarhurst, Union, New Jersey, Fair Lawn, New Jersey, Coral Gables, Florida, and Sunny Isles Beach, Florida.

In November 2007, one of the last two remaining Jahn's, in Richmond Hill, closed. (The Richmond Hill Historical Society says it closed in 2008.) The last Jahn's is at 81–04 37th Avenue in Jackson Heights, Queens.

In addition to its huge Kitchen Sink Sundae, other popular ice cream treats included the Boilermaker, the Suicide Frappé, Screwball's Delight, the Joe Sent Me, and the (#”&’$?/) Special.
