= Queens Community Board 9 =

Queens Community District 9
- Community District
- Country: United States
- State: New York
- City: New York City
- Borough: Queens
- Neighborhoods: list: Kew Gardens; Ozone Park; Richmond Hill; Woodhaven

Government
  - Chair: Sherry Algredo
  - District Manager: James McClelland

Area
  - Total: 3.8 sq mi (9.8 km^{2})

Population (2016)
  - Total: 154,987
  - Density: 41,000/sq mi (16,000/km^{2})

Ethnicity
  - African-American: 5.8%
  - Asian: 26.3%
  - Hispanic and Latino Americans: 41.8%
  - White: 17.9%
  - Others: 8.1%
- Time zone: UTC−5 (Eastern)
  - Summer (DST): UTC−4 (EDT)
- Area code: 718, 347, 929, and 917
- Police Precinct: 102nd (website)
- Website: www1.nyc.gov/site/queenscb9/index.page

The Queens Community Board 9 is a local government in the New York City borough of Queens, encompassing the neighborhoods of Richmond Hill, Woodhaven, Ozone Park and Kew Gardens. It is delimited by the Brooklyn border to the West, Park Lane and Union Turnpike to the North, Van Wyck Expressway to the East and 103rd Avenue on the South.
