= RKO Keith's Theater (Richmond Hill, Queens) =

Former movie theater in Queens, New York

Coordinates: 40°42′1.458″N 73°49′57.29″W

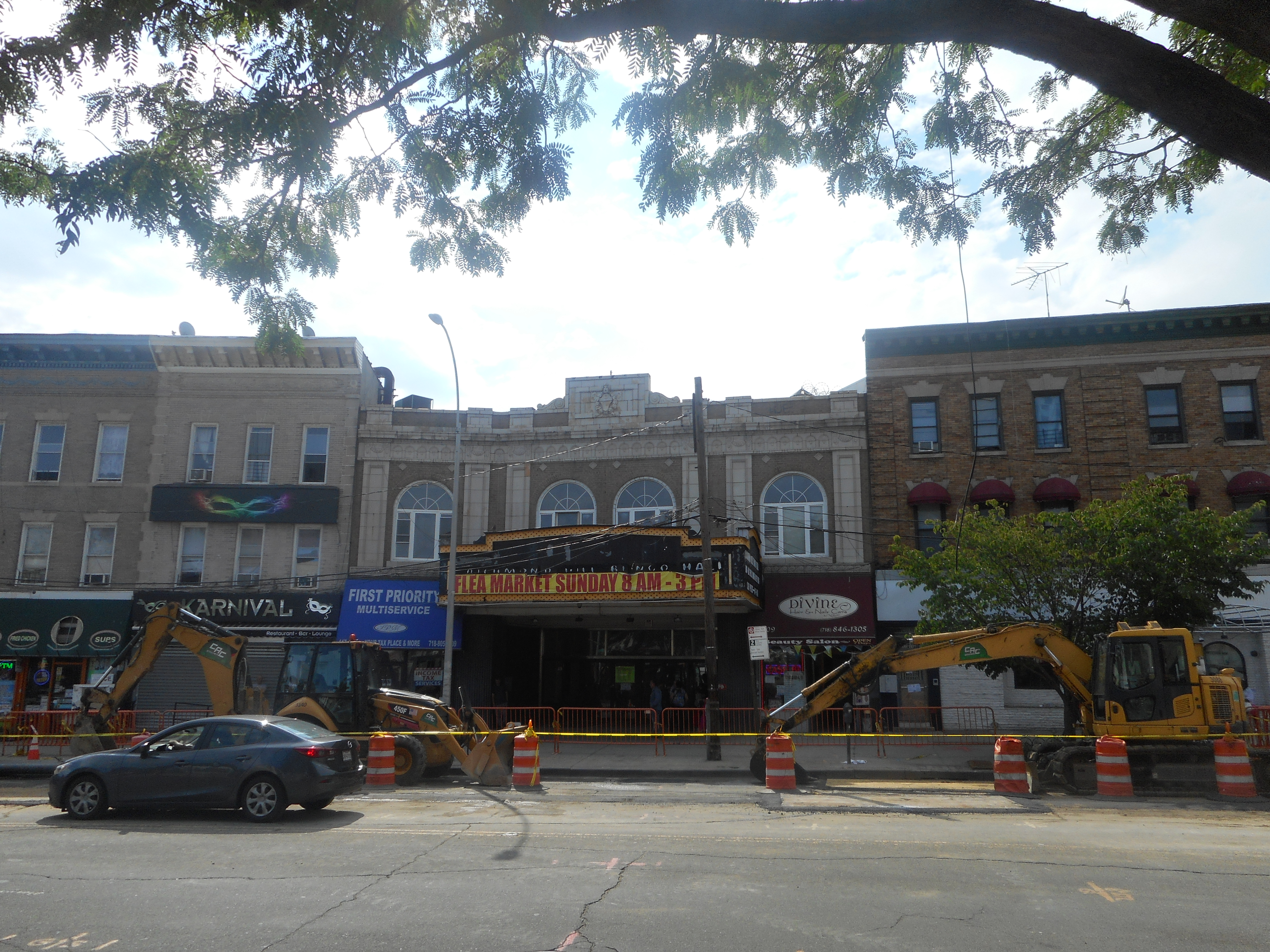
The former RKO Keith's Theater on Hillside Avenue in Richmond Hill

RKO Keith's Theater is a historic RKO Pictures movie theater located at 117-09 Hillside Avenue in the Richmond Hill section of the New York City borough of Queens. It was designed by architect R. Thomas Short and built in 1929 in the Neo-Classical Revival style. It has a two-story, three bay wide front facade with its original, horizontal marquee and terra cotta details. The orchestra level measures 100 feet 6 inches (30.6 m) deep and 99 feet (30 m) wide. It has a balcony and three tiered boxes of seating on the north and south walls.

The theater closed in 1968 and it has been used as a bingo hall and flea market. In 2003, the theater was listed on New York's State Register of Historic Places, but the property owner refused listing on the National Register of Historic Places.

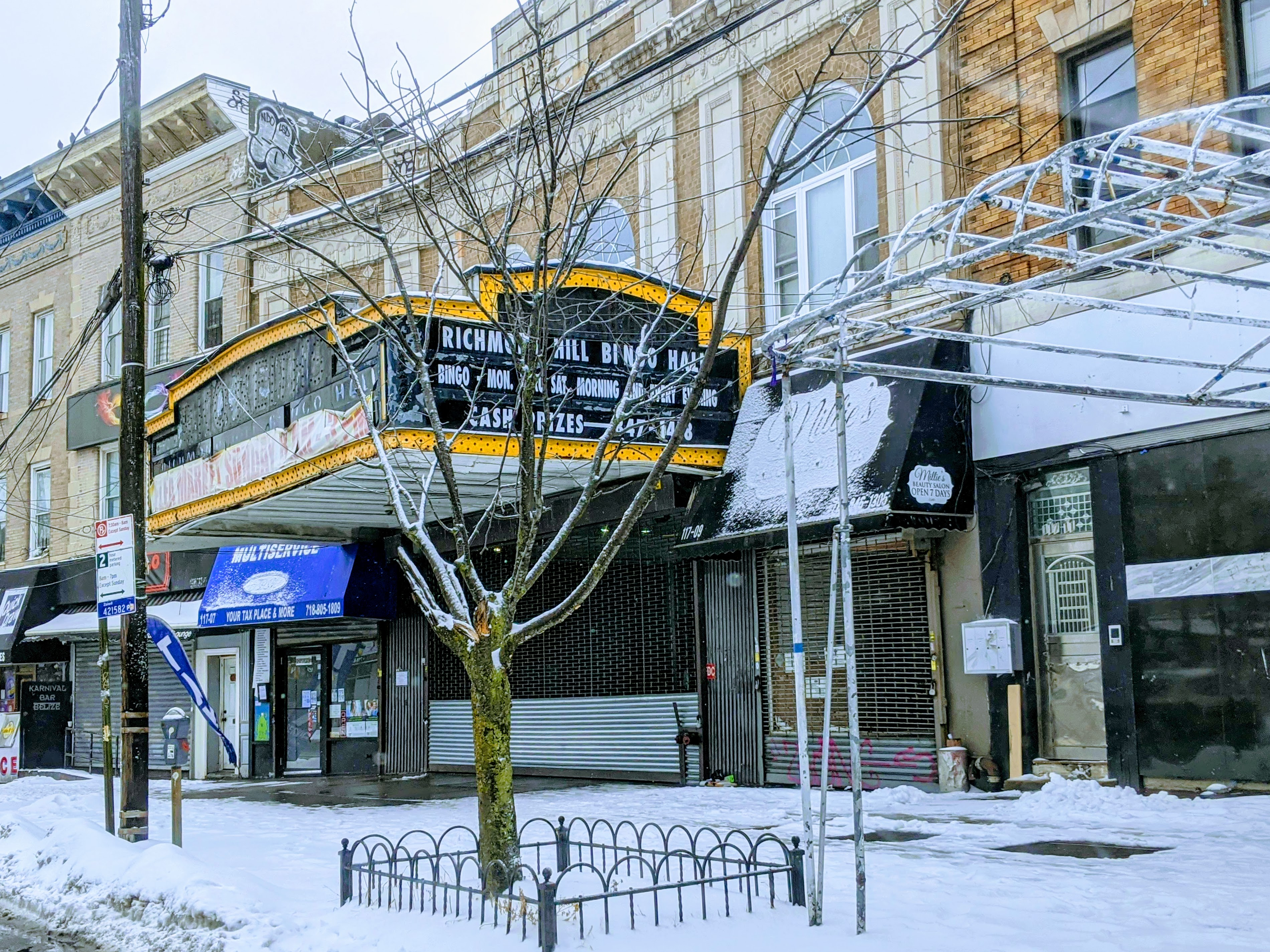
View of the former RKO Keith's Theater as of February 2021
