= Masjid Al-Mamoor =

Muslim community center in Queens, New York

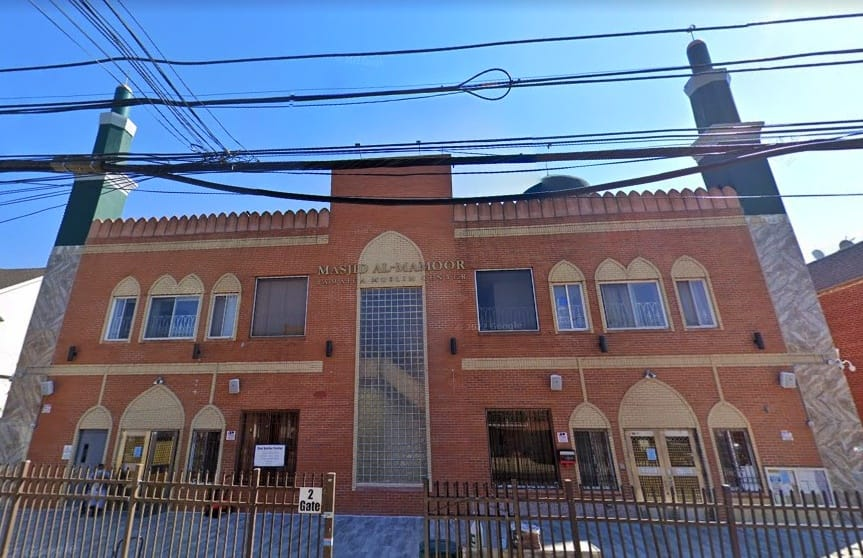
Masjid Al Mamoor. Jamaica Muslim Center. 85-37 JMC Way, Jamaica, NY 11432, United States

Masjid Al-Mamoor, also known as the Jamaica Muslim Center, is one of the largest multi-purpose Muslim establishments in Jamaica, New York. The center includes a mosque, a school, and a place for religious gatherings and eating facilities. The center has a religious Hifzul class called Jamiah Qurania Academy.

== History ==
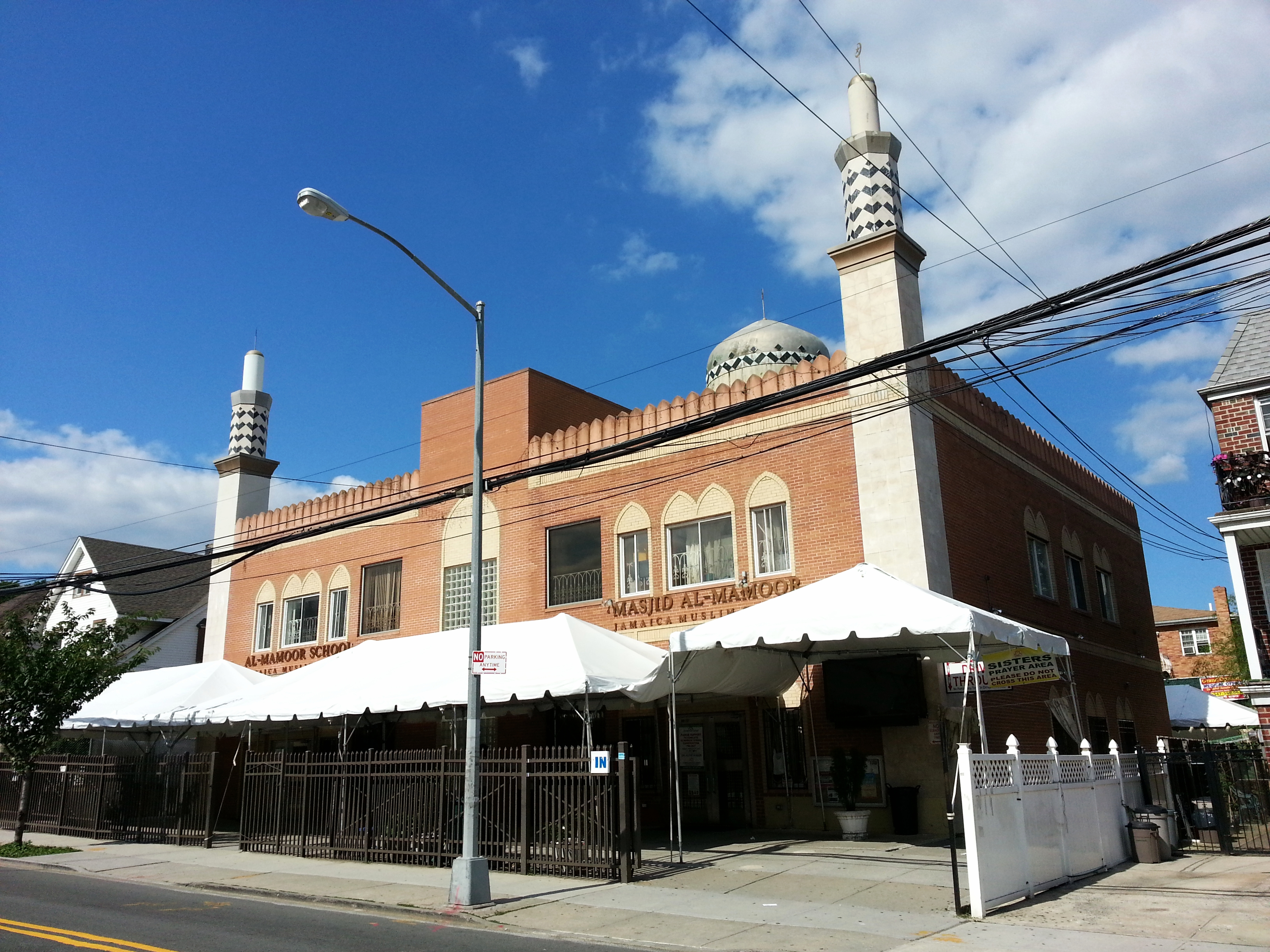
Masjid Al Mamoor

Masjid Al-Mamoor was started mostly Bangladeshi Americans in 1976, as it is located in the heavily Bangladeshi-American locality of Jamaica, New York.
