= Jamaica, Queens =

Neighborhood in New York City

Jamaica
- Neighborhood
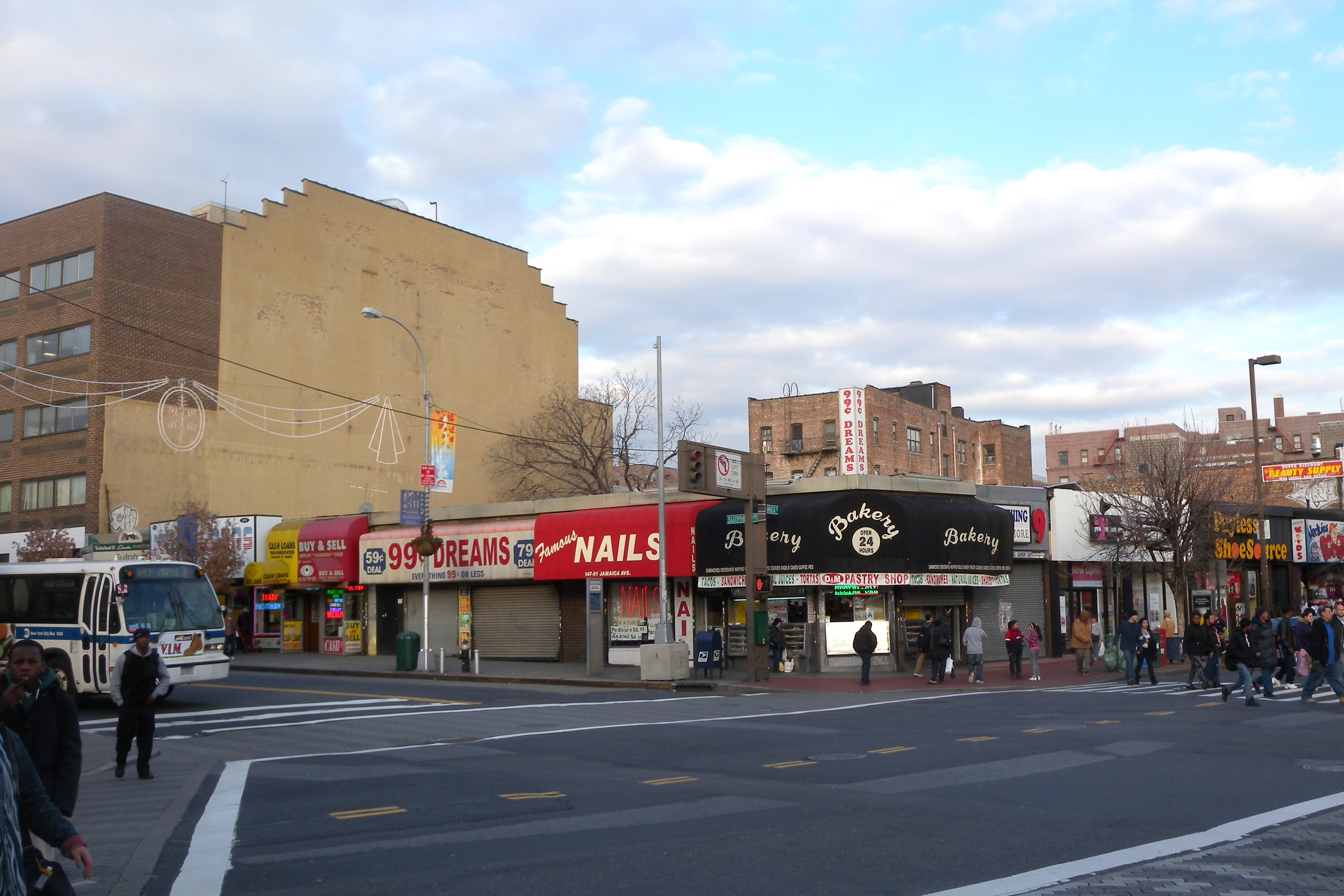
- Jamaica Avenue and Sutphin Boulevard
- Interactive map of Jamaica
- Coordinates: 40.7°N 73.8°W
- Country: United States
- State: New York
- City: New York City
- County/Borough: Queens
- Community District: Queens 12
- Languages: List: 59.0% English; 25.4% Spanish; 15.6% Other

Area
  - Total: 2.670 sq mi (6.92 km^{2})

Population (2020)
  - Total: 60,993
  - Density: 22,840/sq mi (8,820/km^{2})

Ethnicity
  - Black: 17.4%
  - Hispanic: 34.2%
  - White: 3.3%
  - Asian: 34.9%
  - Other/Multiracial: 10.2%
- Time zone: UTC−5 (EST)
  - Summer (DST): UTC−4 (EDT)
- ZIP Codes: 11432, 11433, 11434, 11435, 11436
- Area codes: 718, 347, 929, and 917
- Median household income: $48,559

Jamaica is a neighborhood in the New York City borough of Queens. Jamaica is bordered by Hollis, Queens Village, St. Albans, and Cambria Heights to the east; South Jamaica, Rochdale Village, John F. Kennedy International Airport, and Springfield Gardens to the south; Laurelton and Rosedale to the southeast; Richmond Hill, South Ozone Park, and Aqueduct Racetrack to the west and southwest; Briarwood to the northwest; and Kew Gardens Hills, Jamaica Hills, and Jamaica Estates to the north.

Jamaica may get its name from Yameco, a corruption of a word for "beaver" in the Lenape language spoken by the Native Americans who lived in the area at the time of first European contact. The liquid "y" sound of English is spelled with a "j" in Dutch, the language of the first people to write about the area; the English retained this Dutch spelling, but, after repeated reading and speaking of "Jamaica", slowly replaced the liquid sound with the hard "j" of the English pronunciation of the name today.

Jamaica was settled under Dutch rule in 1656. It was originally called Rustdorp. Under English rule, Jamaica became the center of the "Town of Jamaica"; the name is of Lenape origin and wholly unrelated to that of the country. It was the first county seat of Queens County, holding that title from 1683 to 1788, and was the first incorporated village on Long Island. When Queens was incorporated into the City of Greater New York in 1898, both the town of Jamaica and the village of Jamaica were dissolved, but the neighborhood of Jamaica regained its role as county seat.

Jamaica is the location of several government buildings such as Queens Civil Court, the civil branch of the Queens County Supreme Court, the Queens County Family Court and the Joseph P. Addabbo Federal Building, home to the Social Security Administration's Northeastern Program Service Center. The U.S. Food and Drug Administration's Northeast Regional Laboratory as well as the New York District Office are located in Jamaica. Jamaica Center, the area around Jamaica Avenue, is a major commercial center. The New York Racing Association, based at Aqueduct Racetrack in South Ozone Park, lists its official address as Jamaica. Central Jamaica once housed the Jamaica Racetrack, now the massive Rochdale Village housing development. John F. Kennedy International Airport and the hotels nearby are also located in Jamaica. The neighborhood is located in Queens Community District 12. It is patrolled by the New York City Police Department's 103rd and 113th Precincts.

== History ==
=== Etymology ===
The neighborhood was named Yameco, a corruption of the word yamecah, meaning "beaver", in the language spoken by the Lenape, the Native Americans who lived in the area at the time of first European contact. The semivowel "y" sound of English is spelled with a "j" in Dutch, the language of the first people to write about the area; the English retained the Dutch spelling but replaced the semivowel sound with the affricate [dʒ] sound that the letter "j" usually represents in English. The name of the Caribbean island country Jamaica is unrelated, coming from the Taíno term Xaymaca, meaning "land of wood and water" or "land of springs"; the "x" spelling became a hard "j".

=== Precolonial and colonial periods ===
Jamaica Avenue was an ancient trail for tribes from as far away as the Ohio River and the Great Lakes, coming to trade skins and furs for wampum. It was in 1655 that the first settlers paid the Native Americans with two guns, a coat, and some powder and lead, for the land lying between the old trail and "Beaver Pond", now filled in. What is now Tuckerton Street north of Liberty Avenue runs through the site of the old pond, and Beaver Road was named for its western edge. Dutch Director-General Peter Stuyvesant dubbed the area Rustdorp ("rest-town") in granting the 1656 land patent. Among its founding settlers was Robert Coe, who was appointed as the first magistrate by the Dutch government, serving until the English took over in 1664, making it a part of the county of Yorkshire.

In 1683, when the Crown divided the colony of New York into counties, Jamaica became the county seat of Queens County, one of the original counties of New York.

Colonial Jamaica had a band of 56 minutemen who played an active part in the Battle of Long Island, the outcome of which led to the occupation of the New York City area by British troops during most of the American Revolutionary War. Rufus King, a signer of the United States Constitution, relocated to Jamaica in 1805. He added to a modest 18th-century farmhouse, creating the manor which stands on the site today; King Manor was restored at the turn of the 21st century to its former glory, and houses King Manor Museum.

=== Late 18th and 19th centuries ===
By 1776, Jamaica had become a trading post for farmers and their produce. For more than a century, their horse-drawn carts plodded along Jamaica Avenue, then called King's Highway. The Jamaica Post Office opened September 25, 1794, and was the only post office in the present-day boroughs of Queens or Brooklyn before 1803. Union Hall Academy for boys and Union Hall Seminary for girls were chartered in 1787. The academy eventually attracted students from all over the United States and the West Indies.

The public school system was started in 1813 with funds of $125. Jamaica Village, the first village on Long Island, was incorporated in 1814 with its boundaries being from the present-day Van Wyck Expressway (on the west) and Jamaica Avenue (on the north, later Hillside Avenue) to Farmers Boulevard (on the east) and Linden Boulevard (on the south) in what is now St. Albans. By 1834, the Brooklyn and Jamaica Railroad company had completed a line to Jamaica.

In 1850, the former Kings Highway (now Jamaica Avenue) became the Brooklyn and Jamaica Plank Road, complete with toll gate. In 1866, tracks were laid for a horsecar line, and 20 years later it was electrified, the first in the state. On January 1, 1898, Queens became part of the City of New York, and Jamaica became the county seat.

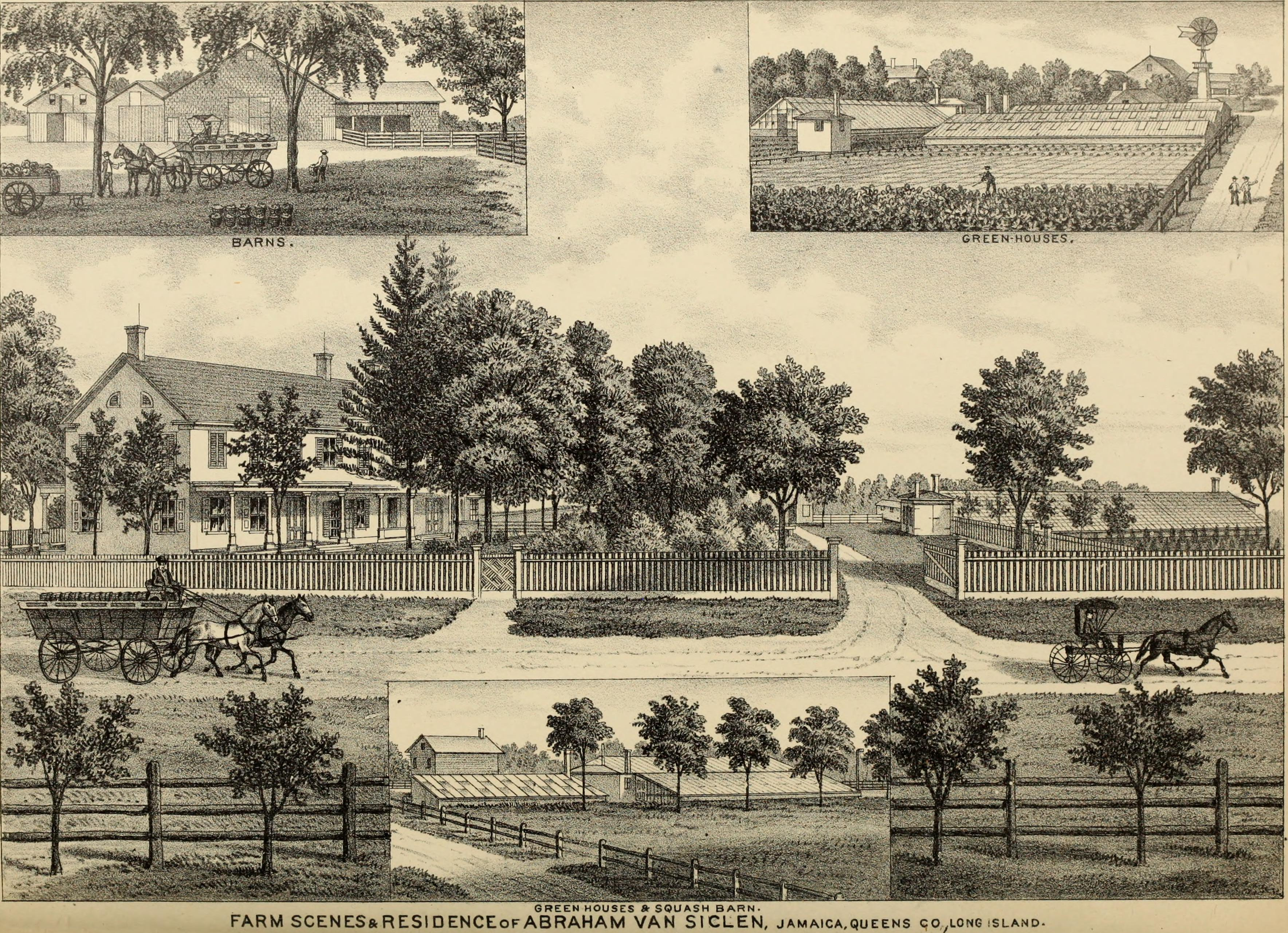
Van Siclen farm in 1882

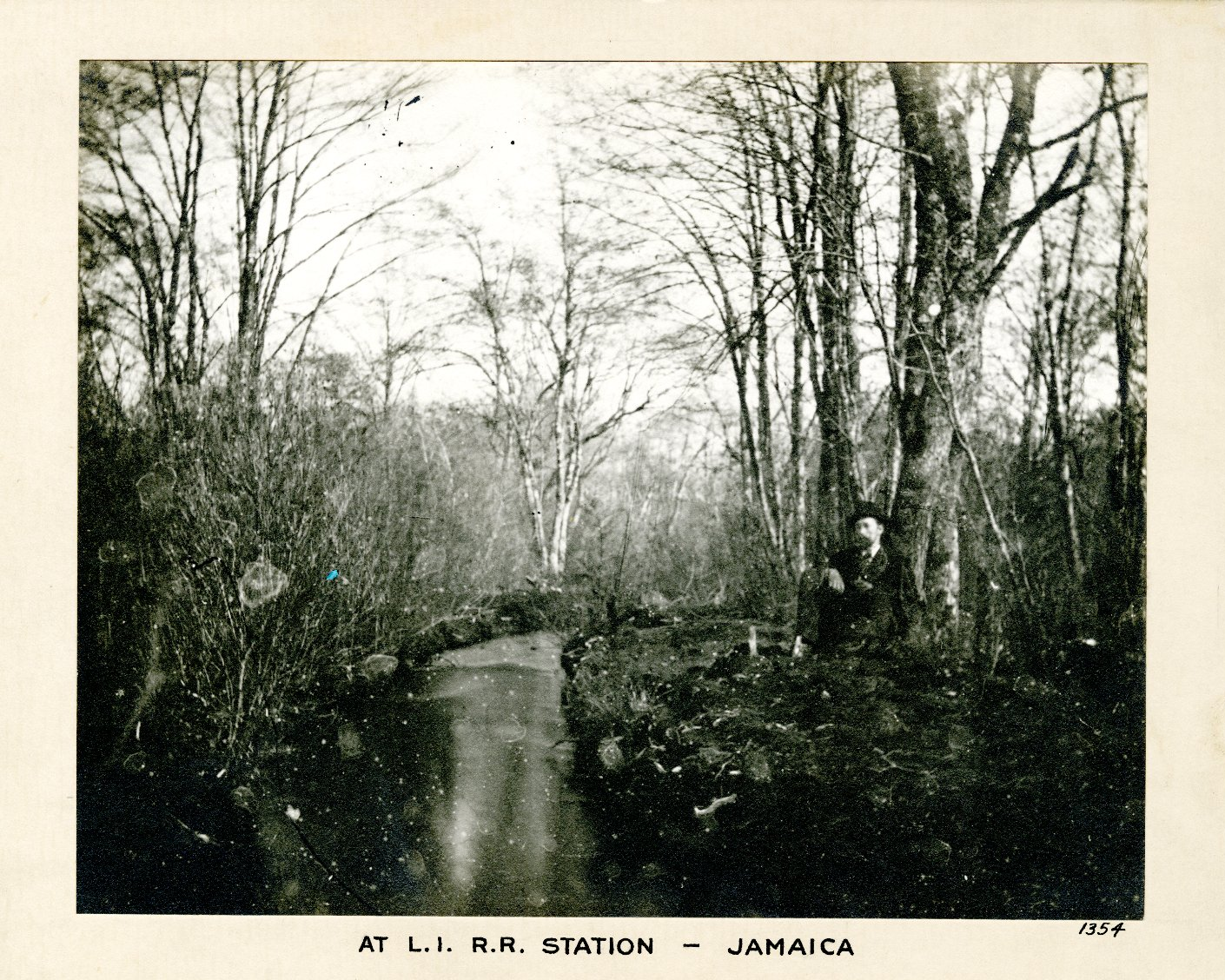
George Bradford Brainerd (American, 1845–1887). Long Island Rail Road Station, Jamaica, ca. 1872–1887. Collodion silver glass wet plate negative. Brooklyn Museum

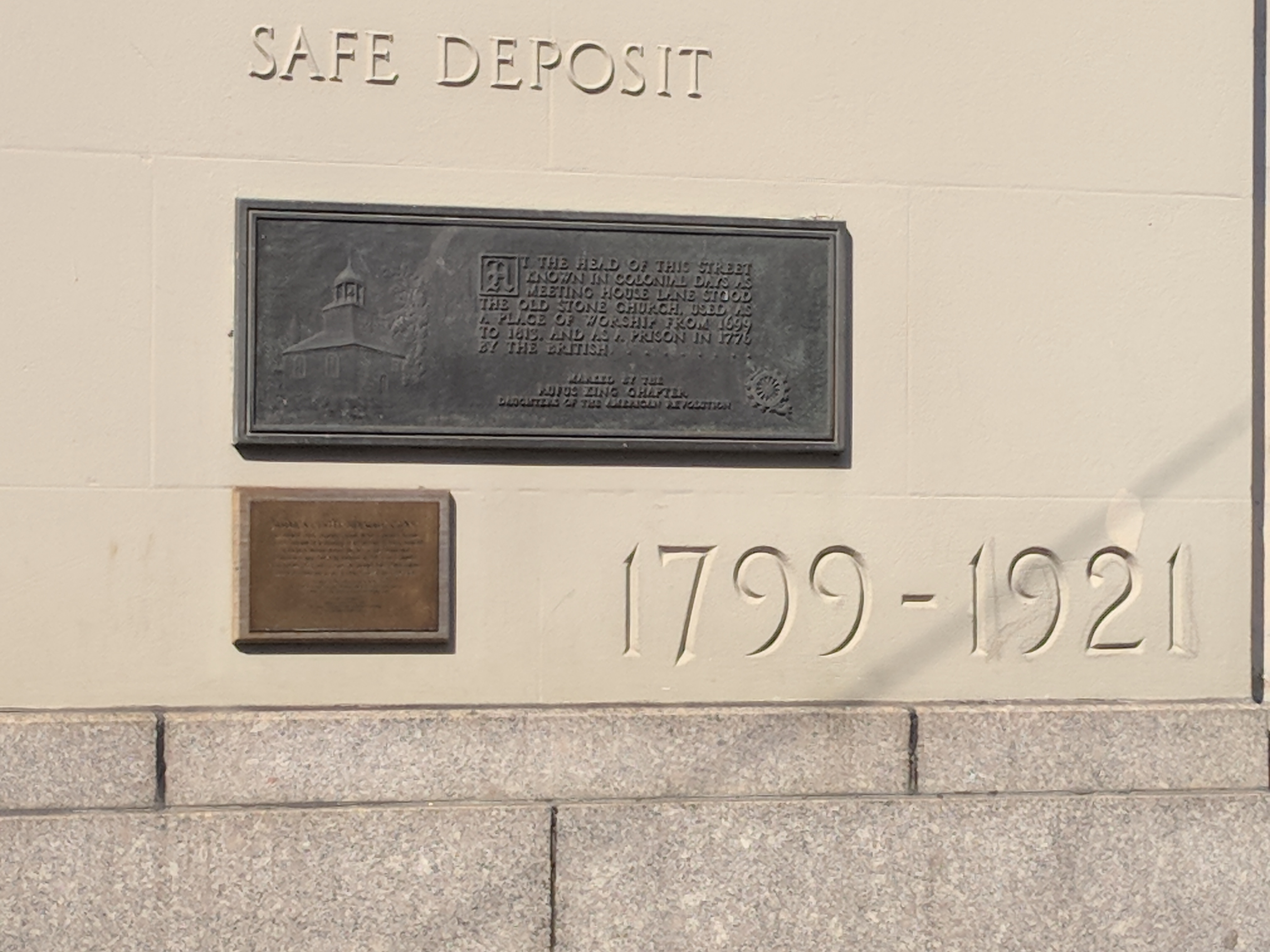
A historical marker at Chase Bank

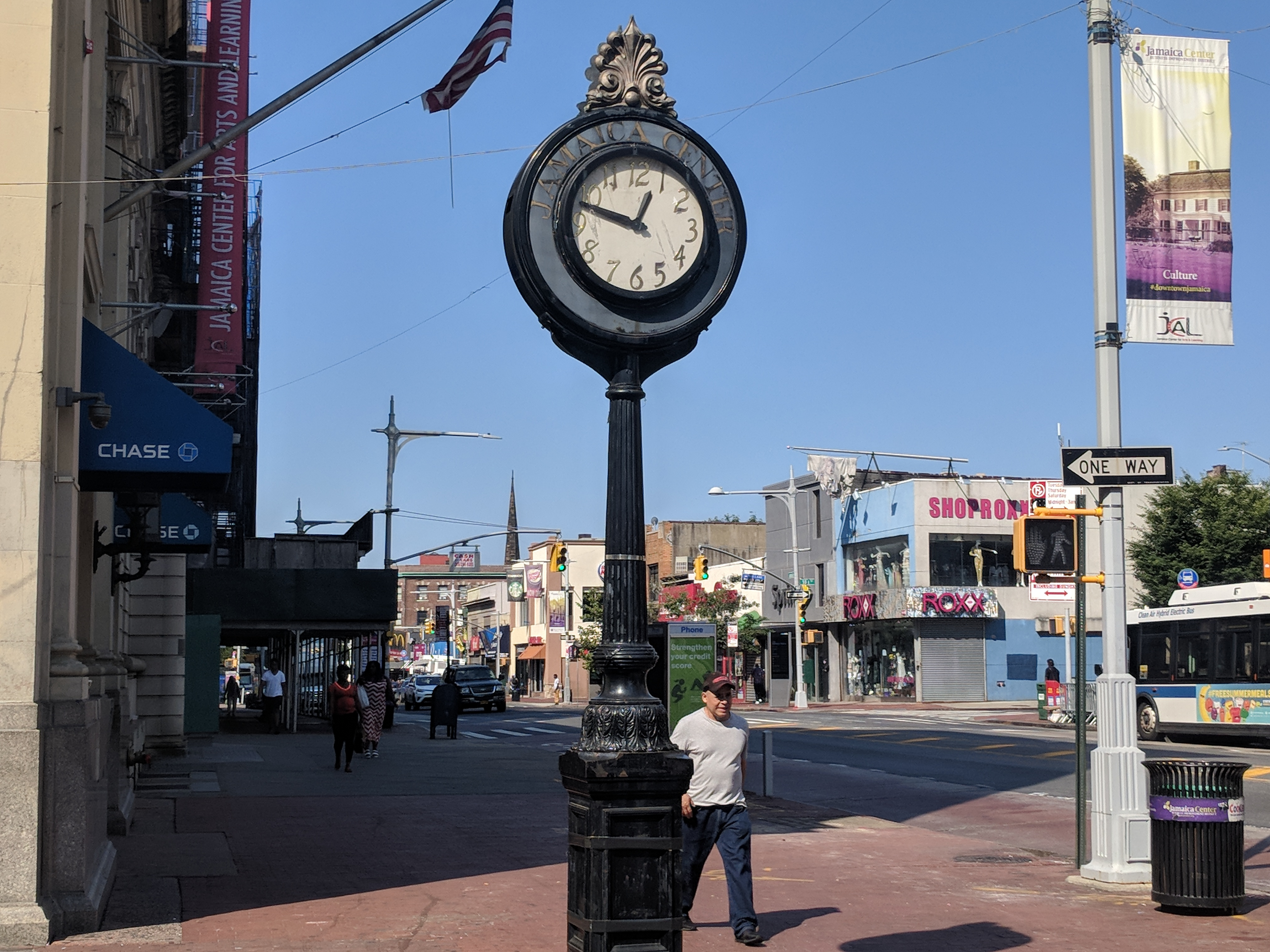
The landmarked sidewalk clock on Jamaica Avenue

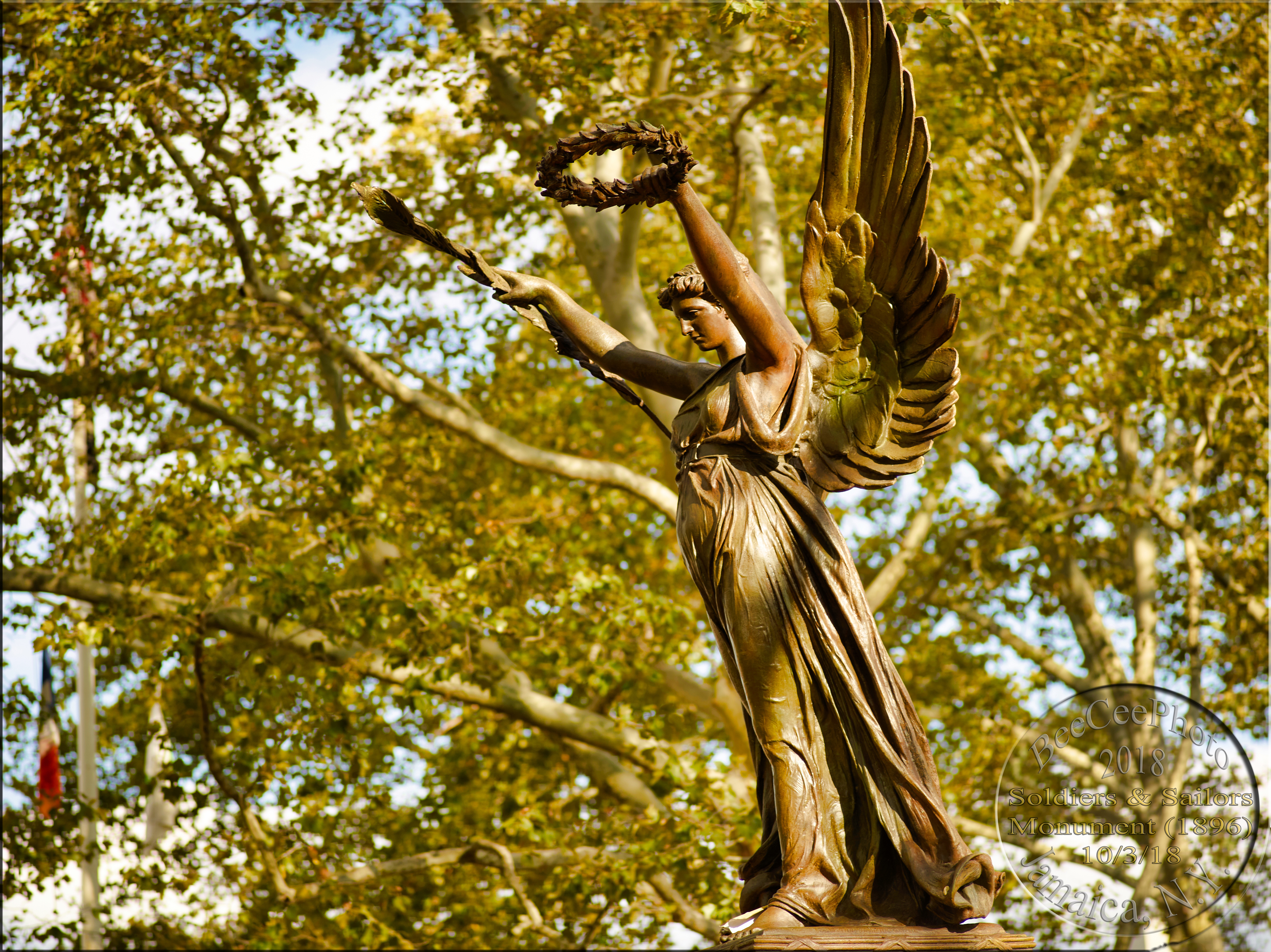
The Soldiers and Sailors Monument (1896) is dedicated to Union soldiers and sailors who died during the American Civil War. It is marked 1861–1865. It is located at Major Mark Park on Hillside Avenue (NY 25) at 176th Street.
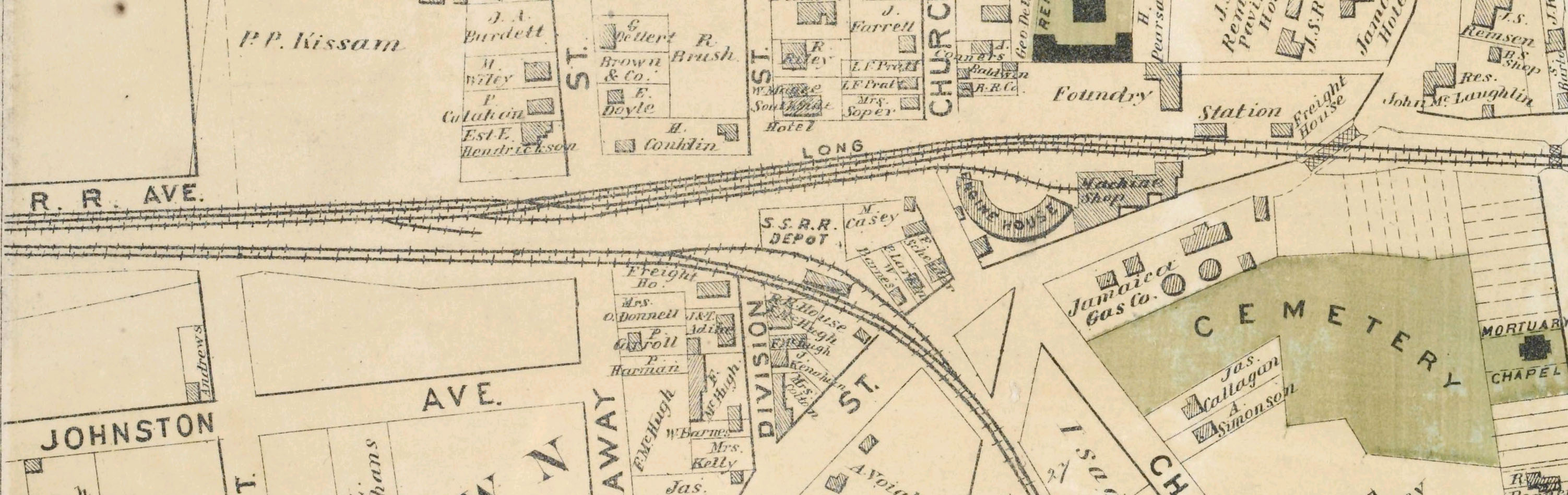
A map of Jamaica railroad stations in 1873
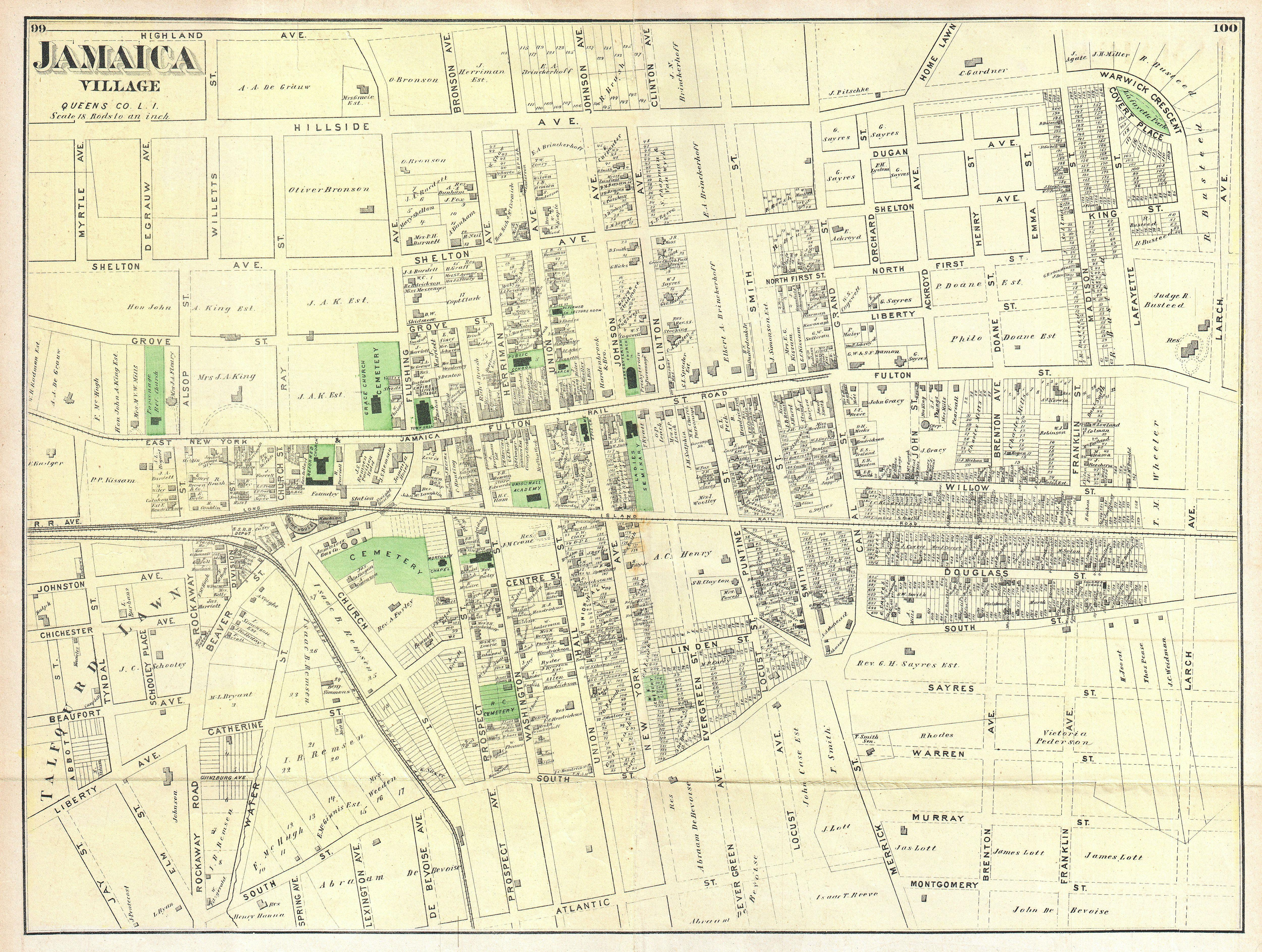
An 1873 Beers map of Jamaica Village, Queens, New York City

=== 20th and 21st centuries ===
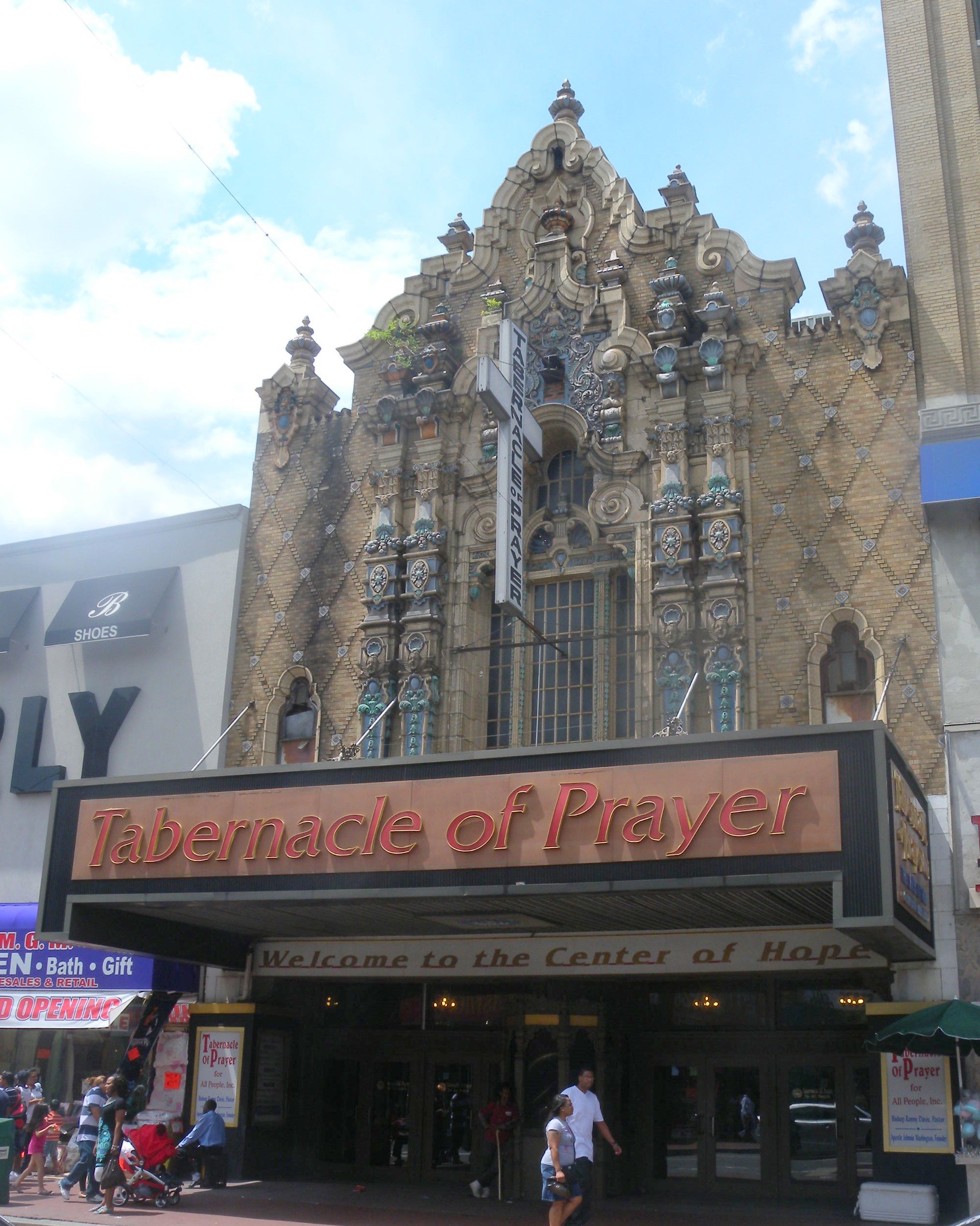
Loew's Valencia, a former theater opened in 1929

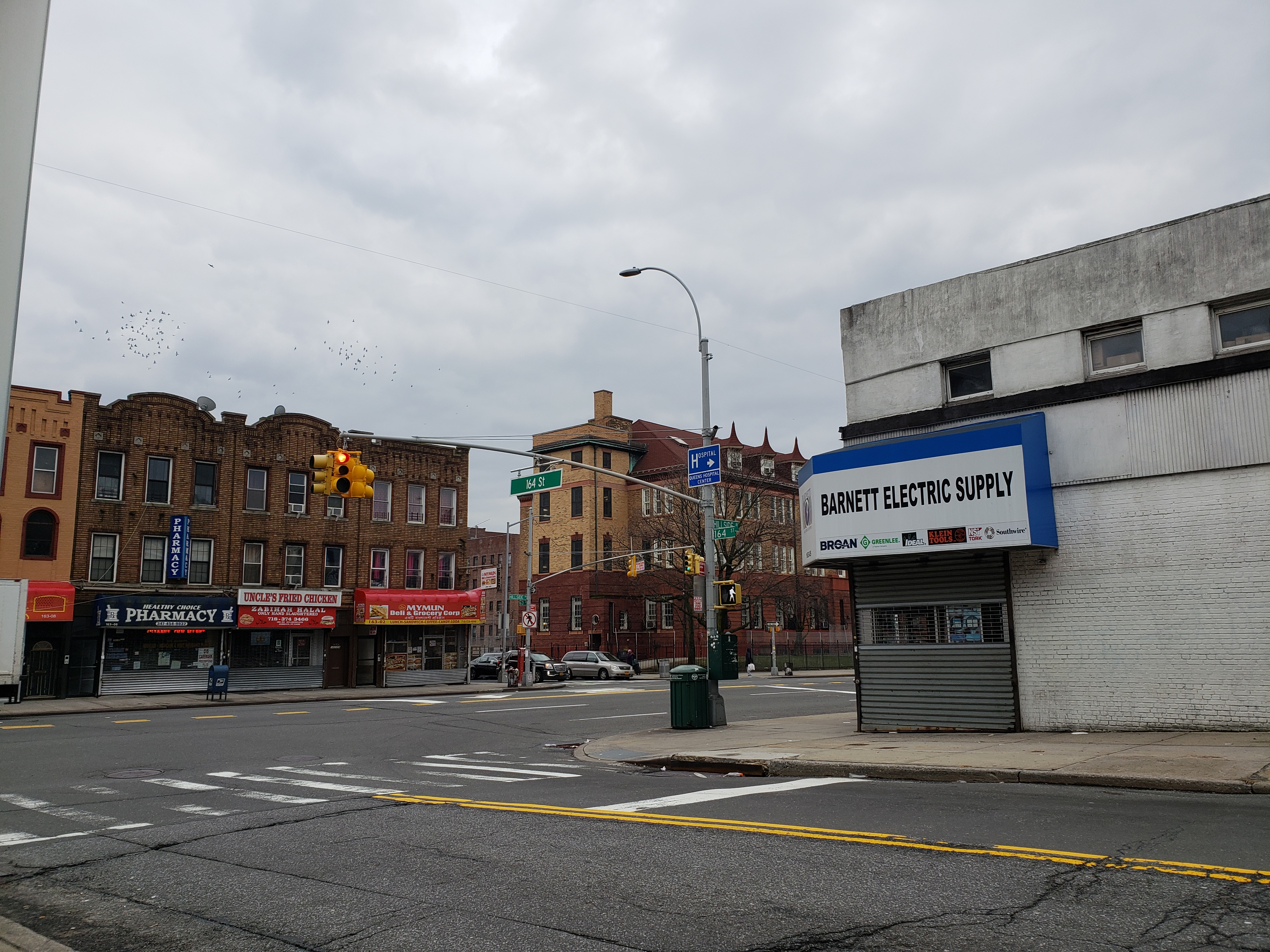
164th Street at Hillside Avenue, Jamaica, Queens

The present Jamaica station of the Long Island Rail Road was completed in 1913, and the BMT Jamaica Line arrived in 1918, followed by the IND Queens Boulevard Line in 1936 and the IND/BMT Archer Avenue lines in 1988, the latter of which replaced the eastern portion of the Jamaica Line that was torn down in 1977–85. The 1920s and 1930s saw the building of the Valencia Theatre (now restored by the Tabernacle of Prayer), the "futuristic" Kurtz furniture store, and the Roxanne Building. In the 1970s, it became the headquarters for the Islamic Society of North America. King Kullen opened in 1930, the first self-service supermarket in the country.

Foreclosures and the high level of unemployment of the 2000s and early 2010s induced many black people to move from Jamaica to the South, as part of the New Great Migration. On October 23, 2014, the neighborhood was the site of a terrorist hatchet attack on two New York City Police Department officers; the police later killed the attacker.

The First Reformed Church, Grace Episcopal Church Complex, Jamaica Chamber of Commerce Building, Jamaica Savings Bank, King Manor, J. Kurtz and Sons Store Building, La Casina, Office of the Register, Prospect Cemetery, St. Monica's Church, Sidewalk Clock at 161-11 Jamaica Avenue, New York, NY, Trans World Airlines Flight Center, and United States Post Office are listed on the National Register of Historic Places.

== Demographics ==
Based on data from the 2020 United States census, the population of Jamaica was 60,993 an increase of 7,110 (13.2%) from the 53,751 counted in 2010. Covering an area of 1,084.85 acres (439.02 ha), the neighborhood had a population density of 56.2 inhabitants per acre (36,000/sq mi; 13,900/km^{2}).

The racial makeup of the neighborhood was 3.3% (2,001) Non-Hispanic White, 17.4% (10,614) Black or African American, 0.9% (466) Native American, 34.9% (21,263) Asian, 5.7% (3,481) from other races, and 4.5% (2,775) from two or more races. Hispanic or Latino residents of any race were 34.2% (20,859) of the population.

The entirety of Community Board 12, which mainly comprises Jamaica but also includes Hollis, had 232,911 inhabitants as of NYC Health's 2018 Community Health Profile, with an average life expectancy of 80.5 years. This is slightly lower than the median life expectancy of 81.2 for all New York City neighborhoods. Most inhabitants are youth and middle-aged adults: 22% are between ages 0 and 17; 27% between 25 and 44; and 27% between 45 and 64. The ratio of college-aged and elderly residents was lower, at 10% and 14% respectively.

In 2017, the median household income in Community Board 12 was $61,670. In 2018, an estimated 20% of Jamaica and Hollis residents lived in poverty, compared to 19% in all of Queens and 20% in all of New York City. One in eight residents (12%) were unemployed, compared to 8% in Queens and 9% in New York City. Rent burden, or the percentage of residents who have difficulty paying their rent, is 56% in Jamaica and Hollis, higher than the boroughwide and citywide rates of 53% and 51% respectively. Based on this calculation, as of 2018, Jamaica and Hollis are considered to be high-income relative to the rest of the city and not gentrifying.

=== Demographic distribution ===
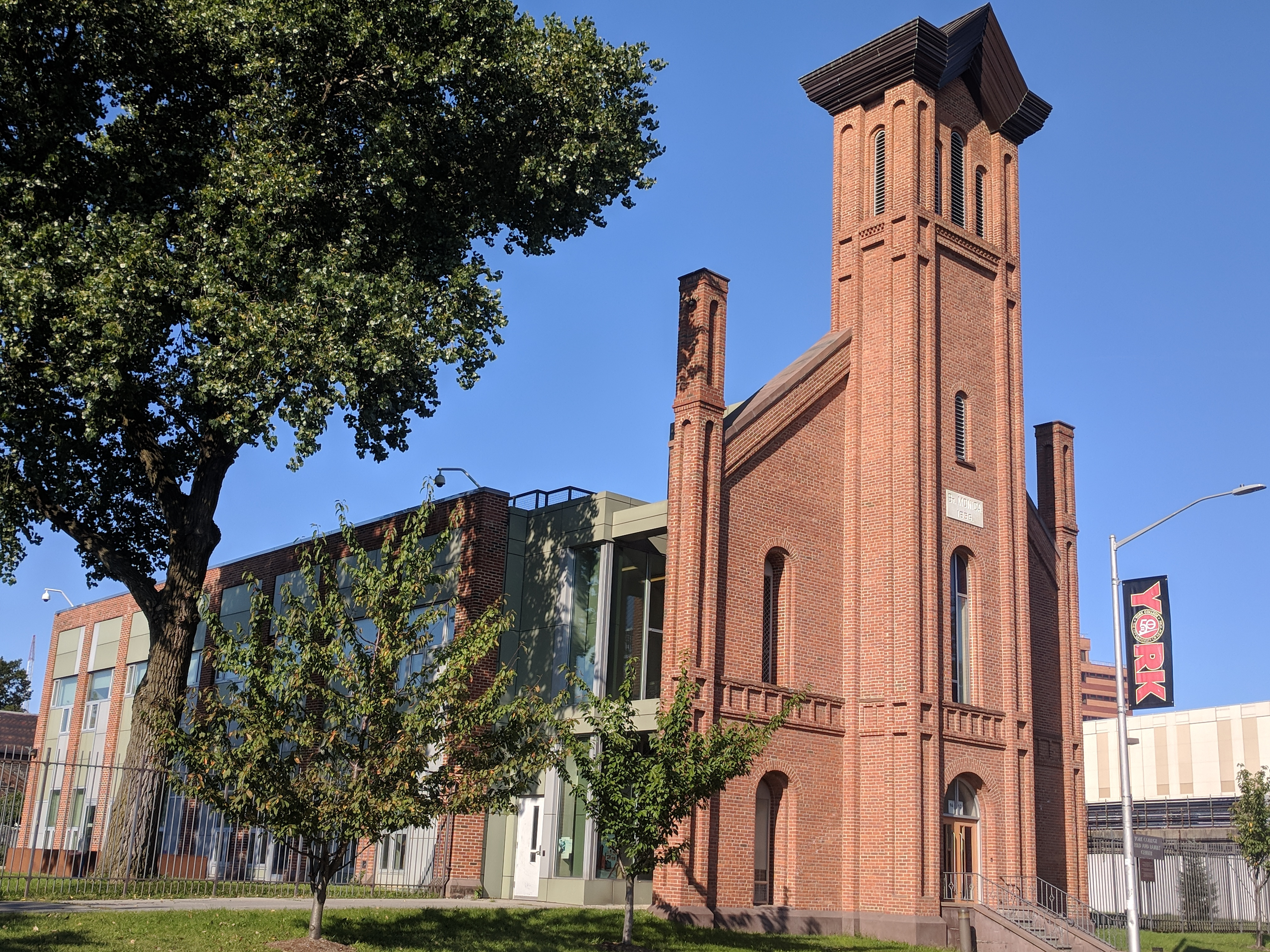
St. Monica's Church

The borough of Queens is one of the most ethnically diverse counties in the world. Jamaica is a large neighborhood with a diverse population, predominantly African Americans, Caribbean/West Indians, Hispanics, and Asians/Asian Indians.

Throughout the 19th and early 20th centuries, Jamaica was mainly populated by Irish immigrants who settled around Downtown and Baisley Pond Park. In the 1950s, a long period of white flight began that lasted through the 1970s and 1980s with middle-income African Americans taking their place. Beginning in 1965 and through the 1970s, many West Indians immigrated to the United States, most of whom settled in New York City.

Many Salvadoran, Colombian, and Dominican immigrants moved in. These ethnic groups tended to stay more towards the Jamaica Avenue and South Jamaica areas. Decrease in crime attracted many families to Jamaica's safe havens; Hillside Avenue reflects this trend. Along 150th to 161st streets, much of the stores and restaurants typify South American and Caribbean cultures.

Farther east is the rapidly growing East Indian community. Mainly spurred on by the Jamaica Muslim Center, Bangladeshis have flocked to this area due to easy transit access and the numerous Bangladeshi stores and restaurants lining 167th and 168th Streets. Bangladeshis are the most rapidly growing ethnic group; however, it is also an African-American commercial area.

Many Sri Lankans live in the area for similar reasons as the Bangladeshi community, reflected by the numerous food and grocery establishments along Hillside Avenue catering to the community. Significant Filipino and African communities thrive in Jamaica, along with the neighboring Filipino community in Queens Village and the historic, well established African-American community residing in Jamaica.

From 151st Street to 164th Street, many groceries and restaurants are representative of the West Indies. Mainly of Guyanese and Trinidadian origin, these merchants serve their respective populations in and around the Jamaica Center area. Many East Indian shops are located east from 167th Street to 171st Street. Mainly supported by the ever-growing Bangladeshi population, thousands of South Asians come here to shop for Bangladeshi goods. Some people call the area "Little South Asia" similar to that of Jackson Heights. Jamaica is another South Asian ethnic enclave in New York City, as South Asian immigration and the city's South Asian population has grown rapidly.

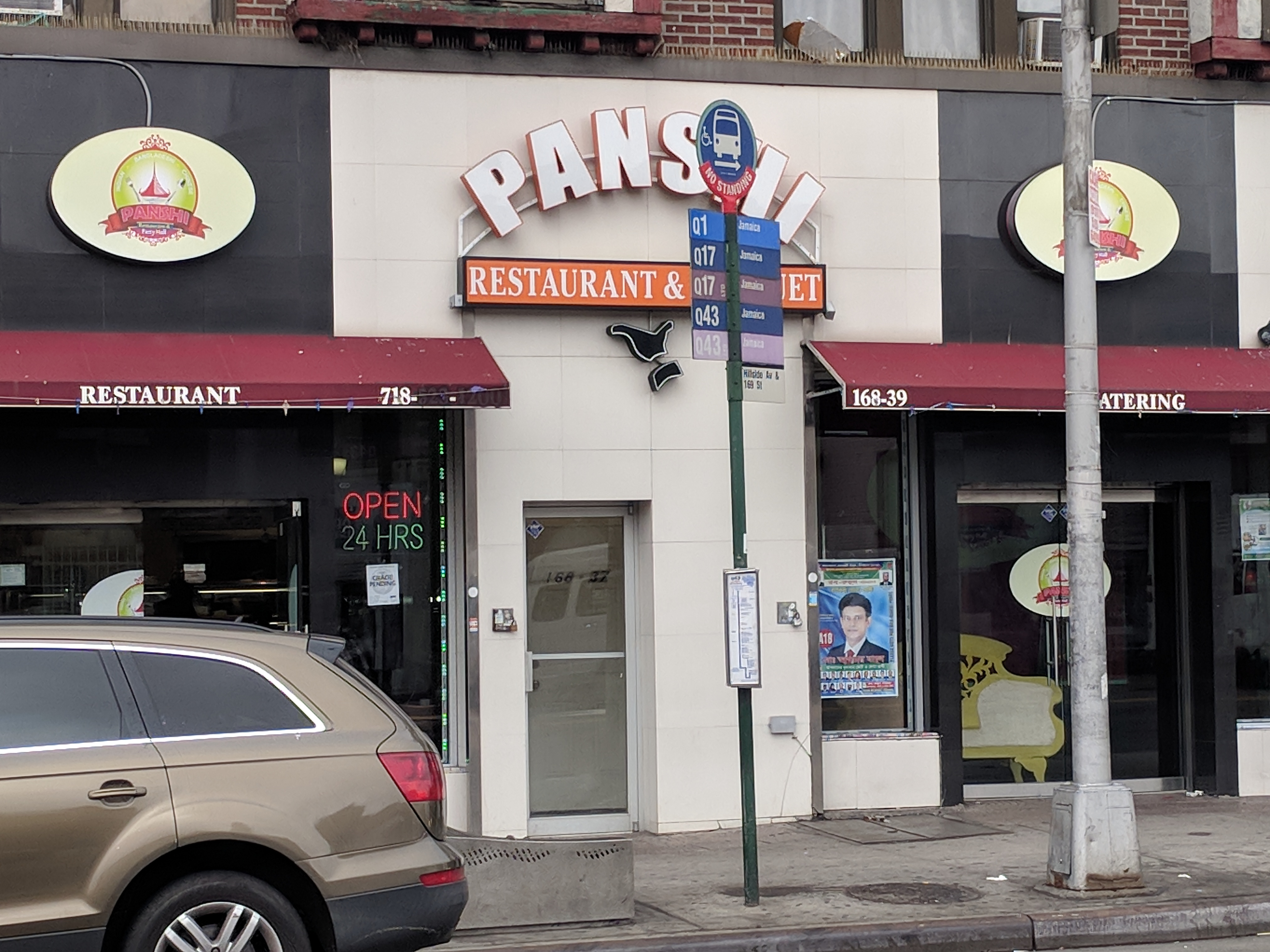
Panshi restaurant

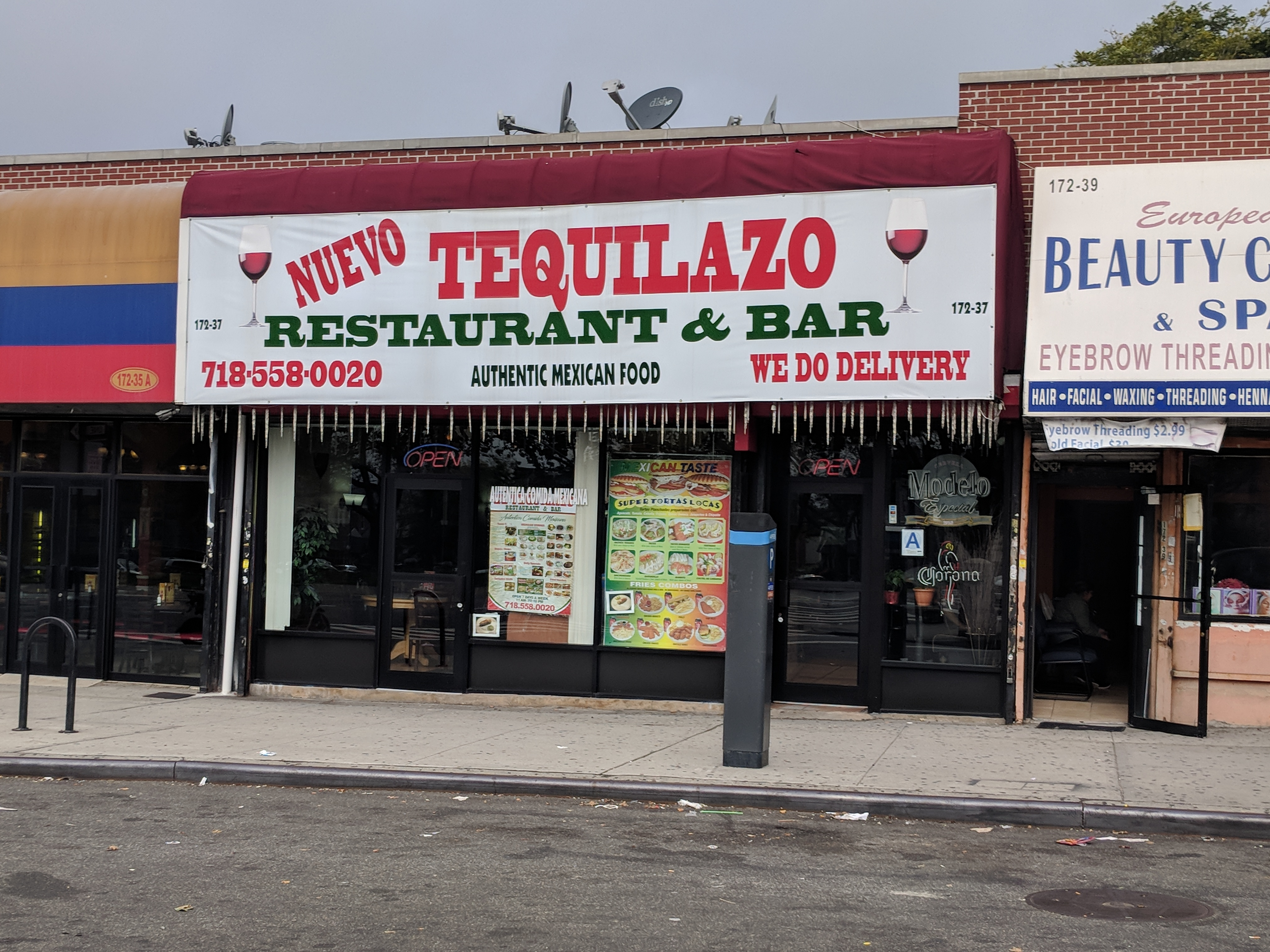
Tequilazo restaurant

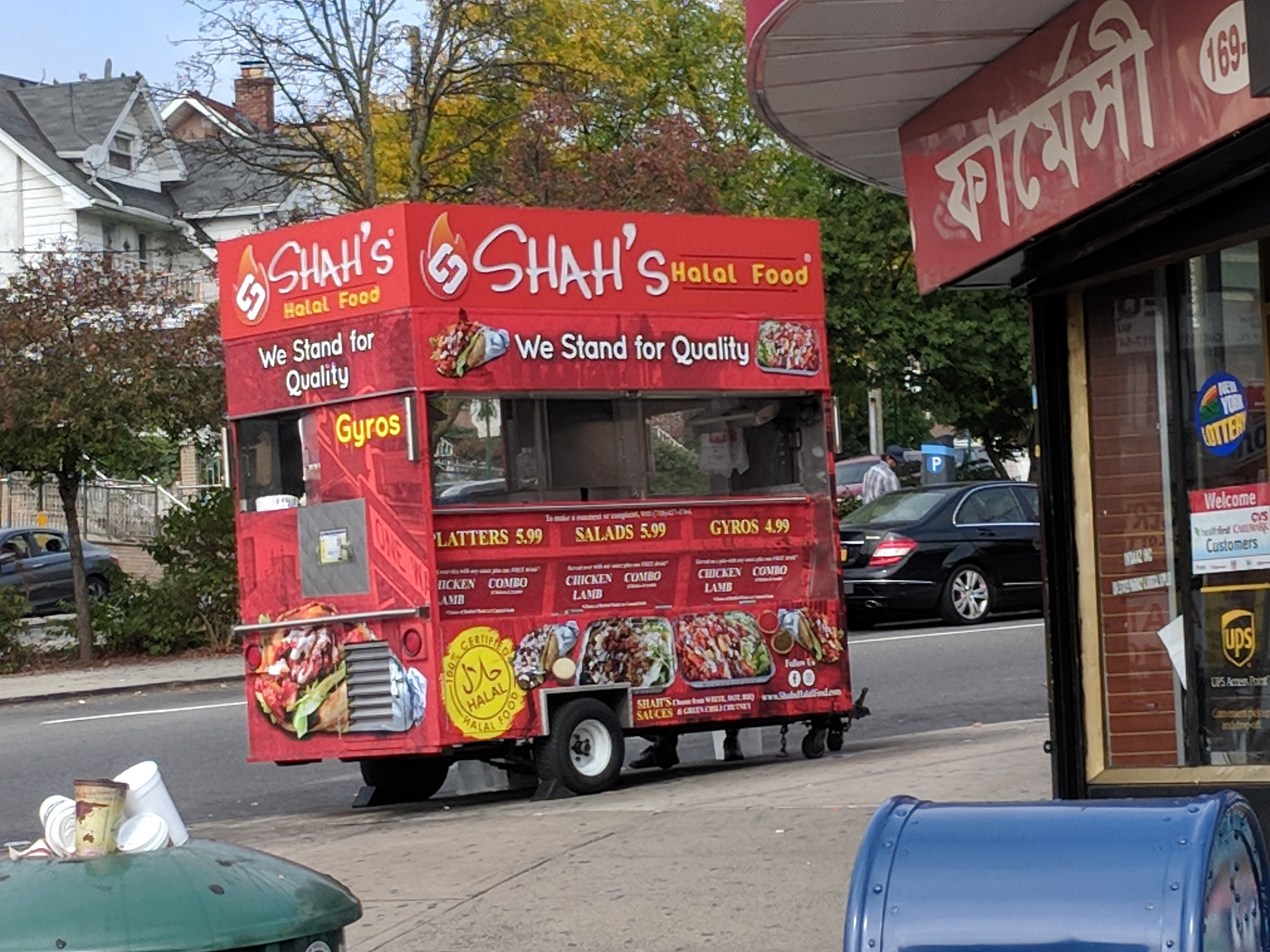
Shah's halal food cart

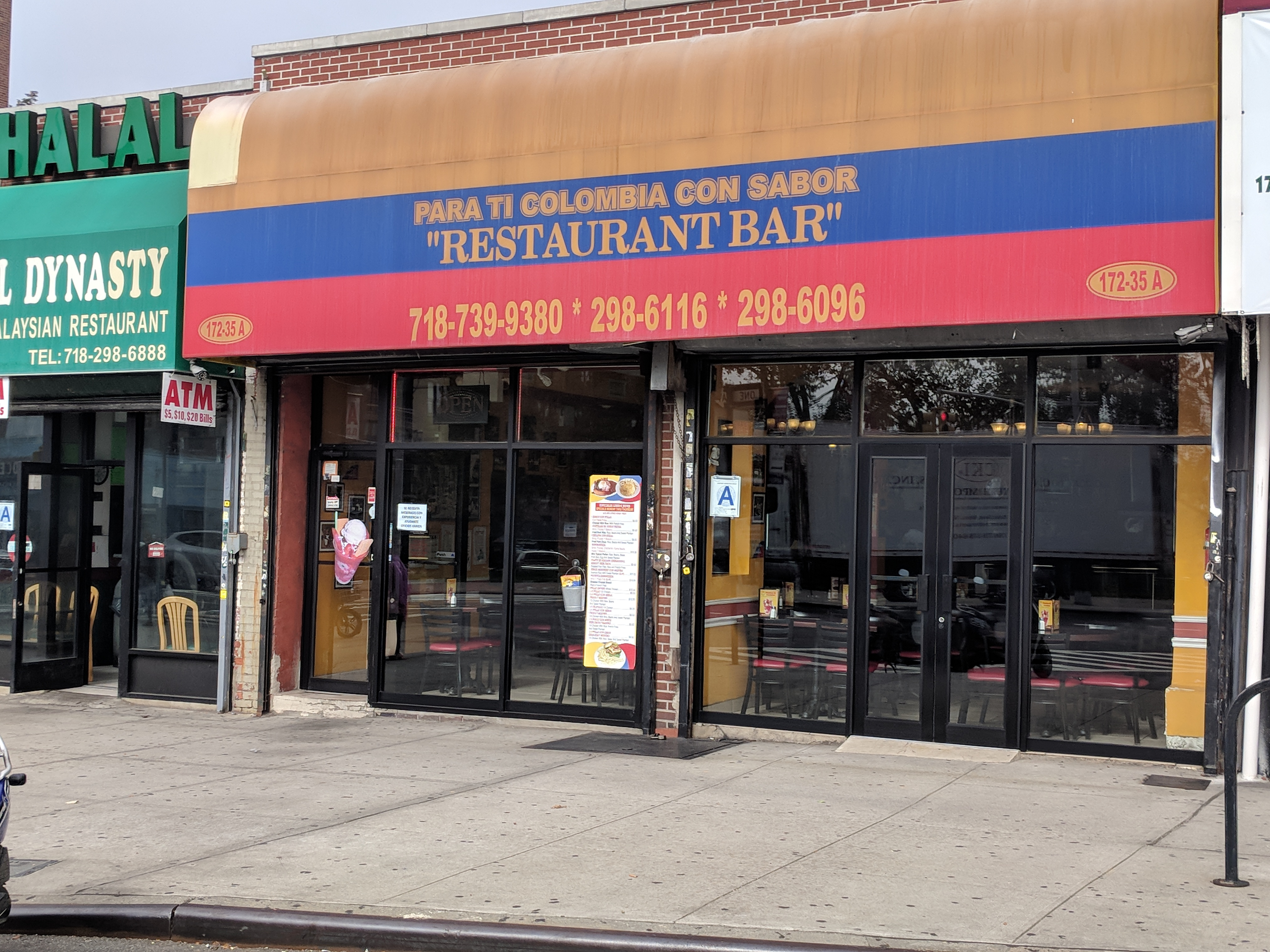
Colombian restaurant

== Economy ==
=== History ===
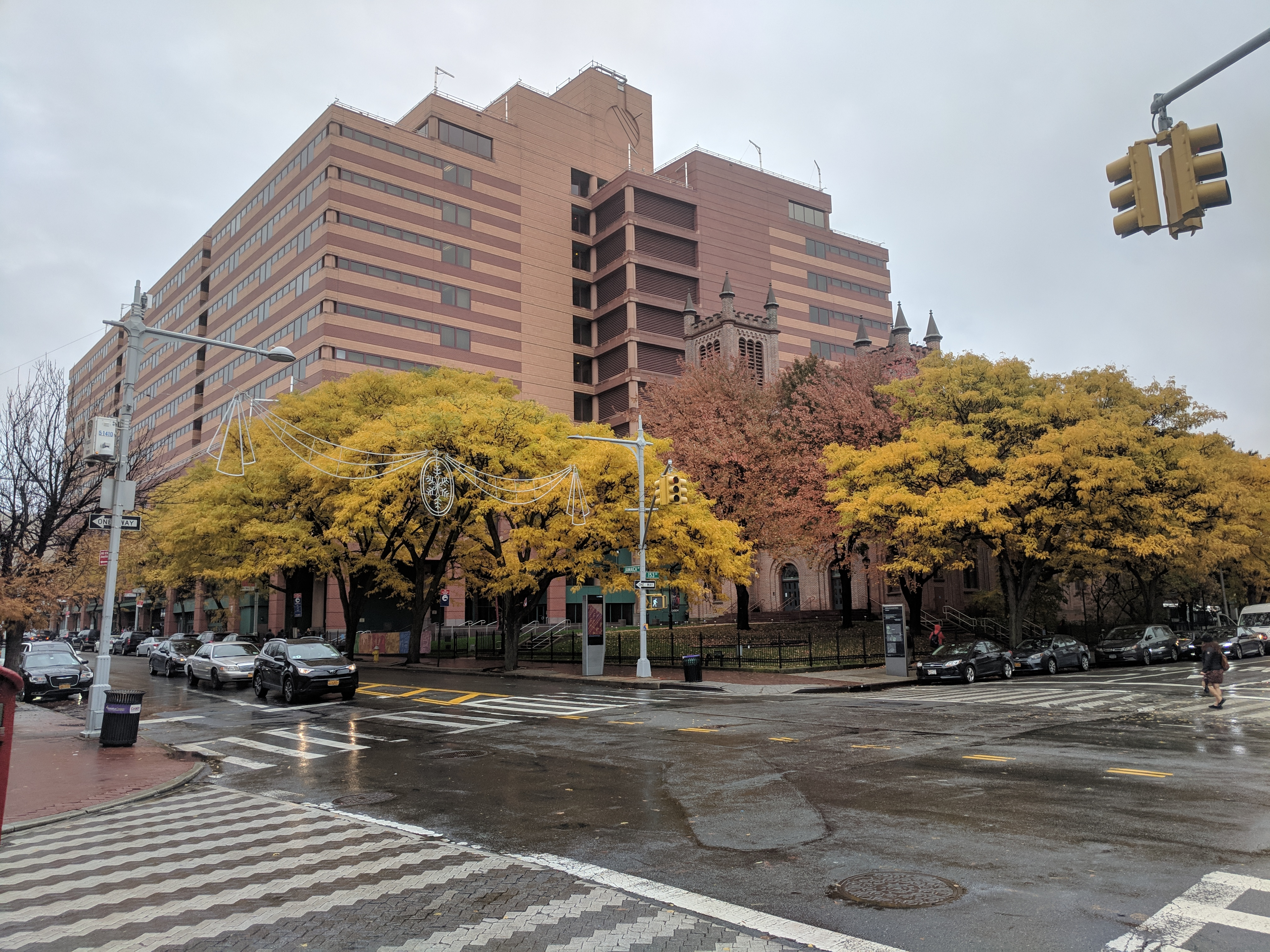
A Social Security Administration building at 153rd Street and Jamaica Avenue.

Economic development was long neglected. In the 1960s and 1970s, many big box retailers moved to suburban areas where business was more profitable. Departing retailers included brand name stores and movie theaters that once thrived in Jamaica's busiest areas. Macy's and the Valencia theater were the last companies to move out in 1969. The 1980s crack epidemic created even more hardship and crime. Prime real estate spaces were filled by hair salons and 99 cent stores. Existing zoning patterns and inadequate infrastructure did not anticipate future development.

Since then, the decrease in crime has encouraged entrepreneurs to invest in the area. The Greater Jamaica Development Corporation, the local business improvement district, acquired valuable real estate for sale to national chains in order to expand neighborhood commerce. They have allocated funds and provided loans to potential investors. One Jamaica Center is a mixed-use commercial complex that was built in 2002. Many banks have at least one branch along major streets: Jamaica Avenue, Parsons Boulevard, Merrick Boulevard, and Sutphin Boulevard. In 2006, a $75 million deal between the developers, the Mattone Group and Ceruzzi Enterprises, and Home Depot cleared the way for a new location at 168th Street and Archer Avenue.

The most prominent development was the renovation and expansion of the Jamaica station from 2001 to 2006. The station, which served the Long Island Rail Road, was expanded with a transfer to the AirTrain JFK to John F. Kennedy International Airport. A further capacity increase included a platform at Jamaica station.

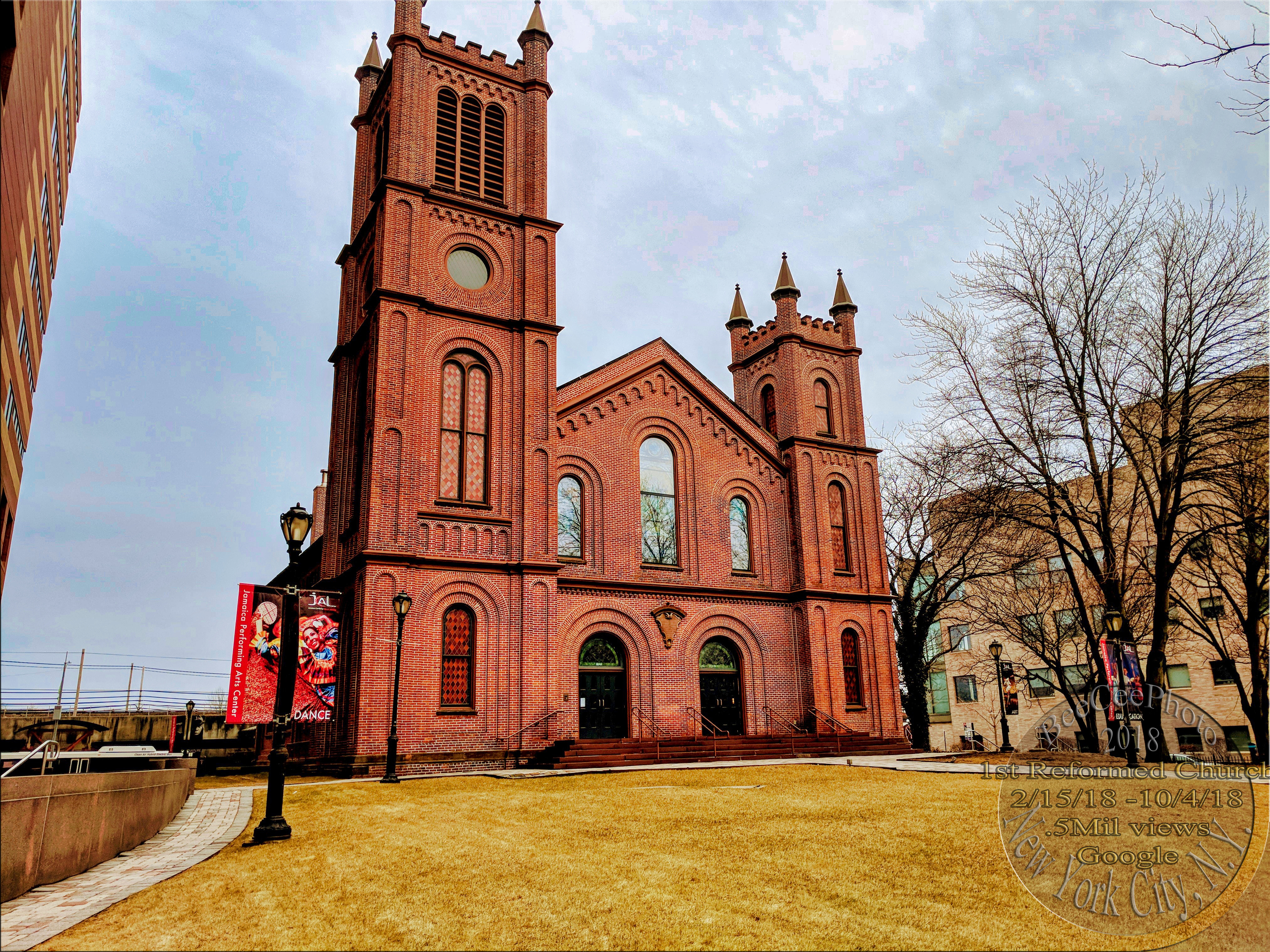
The former First Reformed Dutch Church, now the Jamaica Performing Arts Center (JPAC)

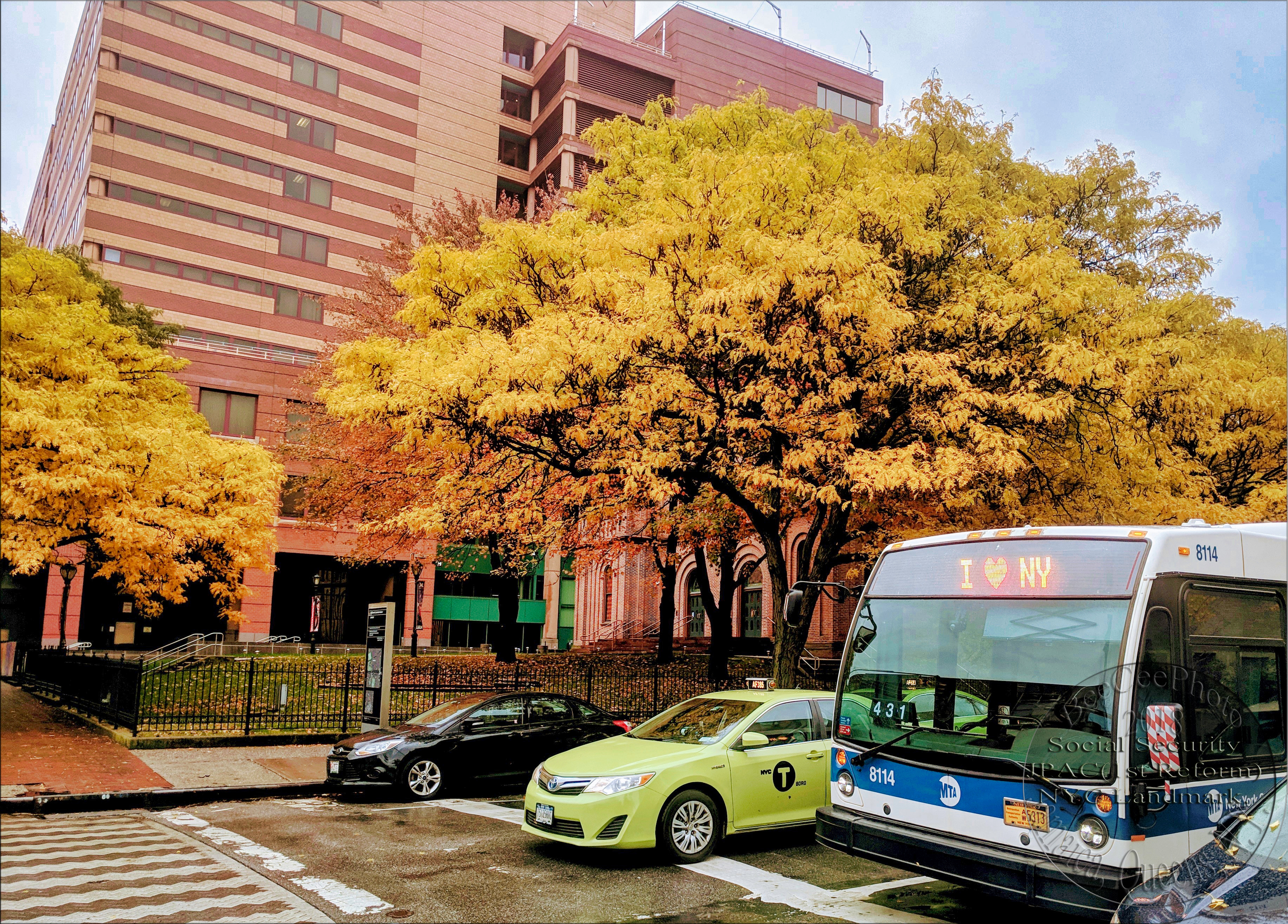
A boro taxi and an MTA bus at 153rd Street/Jamaica Avenue

Efforts have been made to follow the examples of major redevelopment occurring in Astoria, Long Island City, Flushing, and Downtown Brooklyn. In 2005, the New York City Department of City Planning drafted a plan that would rezone 368 blocks of Jamaica in order to stimulate development, relieve traffic congestion, and shift upscale amenities away from low-density residential neighborhoods. The plan includes up-zoning the immediate areas around Jamaica Station to accommodate passengers traveling through the area. To improve infrastructure the New York City Department of Parks & Recreation has agreed to create more greenery and open spaces to allow pedestrians to enjoy the scenery.

At the same time, the city has reserved the right to protect the suburban/residential charm of neighboring areas. Several blocks will be down-zoned to keep up with the existing neighborhood character. In 2007 the City Council overwhelmingly approved the plan, providing for structures of up to 28 stories to be built around the main transit hub as well as residential buildings of up to 7 stories to be built on Hillside Avenue.

According to real-estate listing service StreetEasy, Jamaica's real-estate prices are rising the fastest out of all localities in New York City. The community's median home prices rose 39% in 2015. The median sales price for a small row house in 2015 was $330,000, and the median asking rent for a three-bedroom house in 2015 was $1,750. Sutphin Boulevard has been described as "the next tourist hot spot". Jamaica's proximity to the JFK AirTrain has stimulated the development of several hotels. The 165th Street Mall Improvement Association is a NYC BID Association that focuses on these specific developed stores in Jamaica, Queens.

=== Notable businesses ===
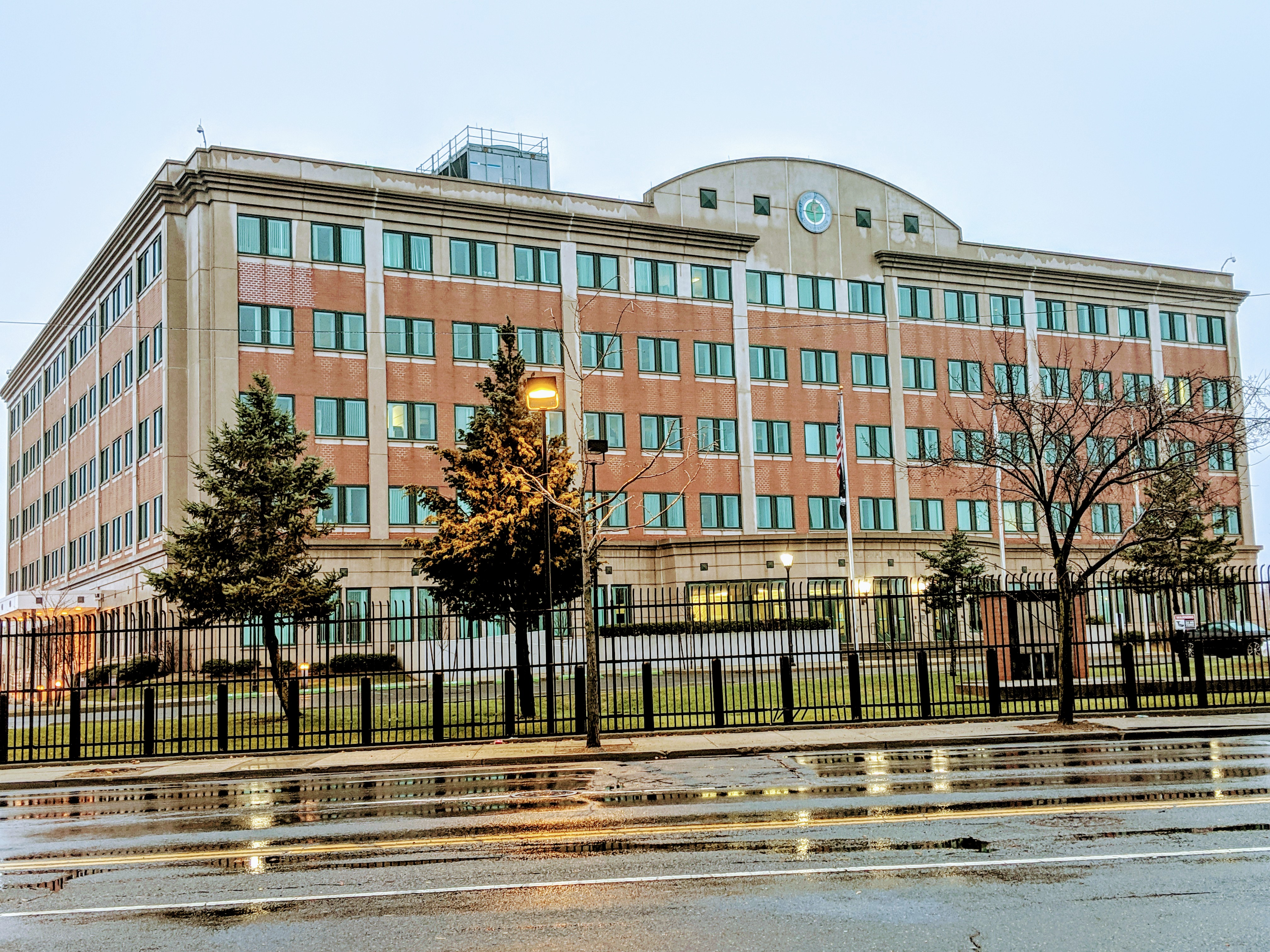
Federal Aviation Administration regional offices

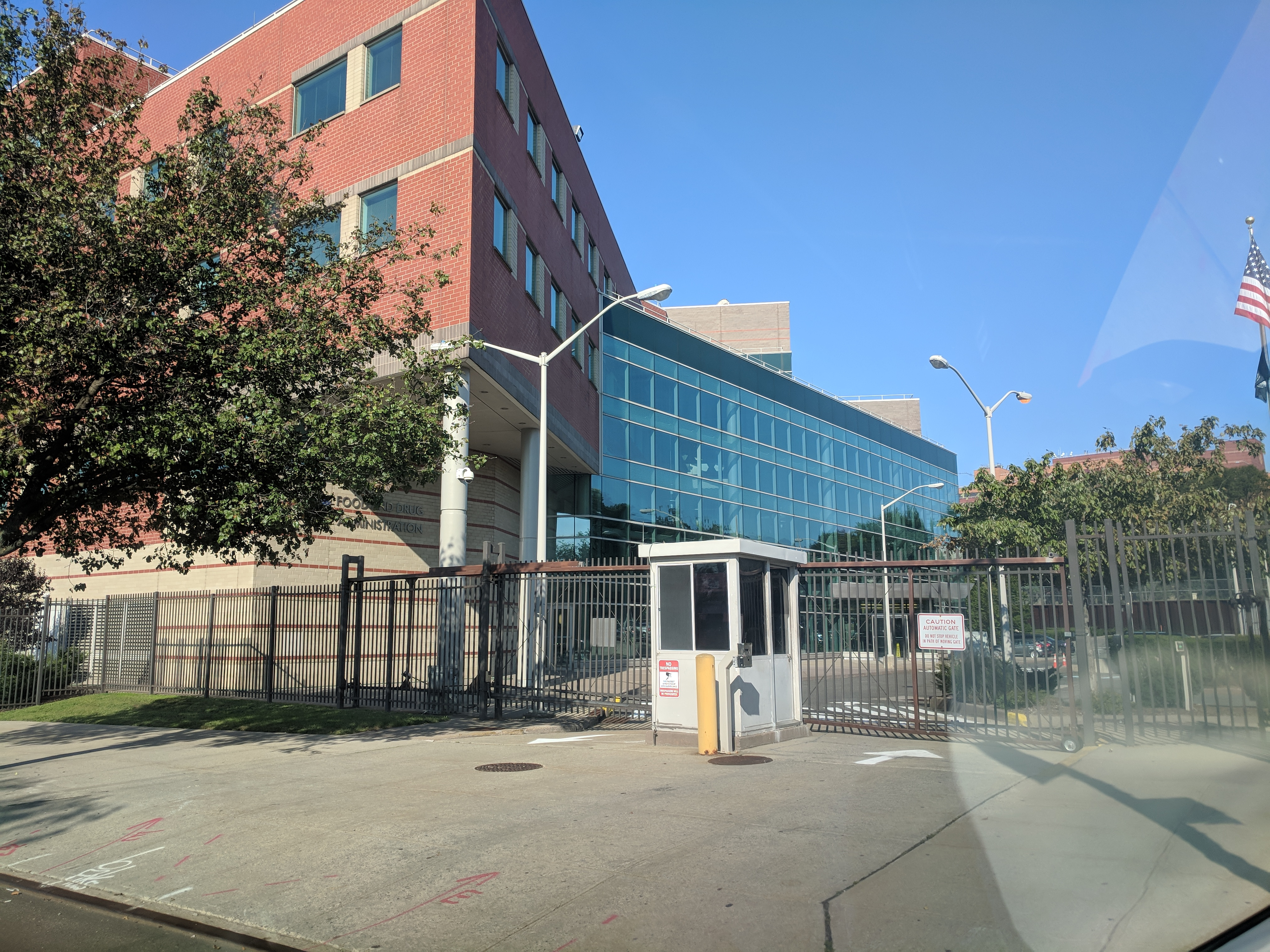
Food and Drug Administration office

The Federal Aviation Administration Eastern Region has its offices at Rockaway Boulevard in South Jamaica, near JFK Airport. Several businesses are at the nearby John F. Kennedy International Airport. North American Airlines has its headquarters on the property of JFK. Nippon Cargo Airlines maintains its New York City offices there.

The Northeastern Program Service Center (NEPSC) is located in the Joseph P. Addabbo Federal Building at Parsons Boulevard and Jamaica Avenue. The NEPSC serves approximately 8.6 million retirement, survivor, and disability insurance beneficiaries, whose Social Security numbers (SSN) begin with 001 through 134, 729, and 805 through 808. The NEPSC also processes disability claims for beneficiaries age 54 and over for the same SSN series. Constructed in 1989, the 932,000-square-foot (86,600 m^{2}) federal building is a 12-story masonry and steel office structure that was built for the agency and was given $8.5 million 2017 dollars to consolidate operations to the lower 2 floors and bring other federal leaseholders from other parts of Queens to occupy the upper floors. The funds approved were part of budget cuts proposed during the Obama administration.

== Police and crime ==
Jamaica is patrolled by two precincts of the NYPD. The 103rd Precinct is located at 168-02 91st Avenue and serves downtown Jamaica and Hollis, while the 113th Precinct is located at 167-02 Baisley Boulevard and serves St. Albans and South Jamaica. The 103rd Precinct ranked 51st safest out of 69 patrol areas for per-capita crime in 2010, while the 113th Precinct ranked 55th safest. As of 2018, with a non-fatal assault rate of 68 per 100,000 people, Jamaica and Hollis's rate of violent crimes per capita is more than that of the city as a whole. The incarceration rate of 789 per 100,000 people is higher than that of the city as a whole.

The 103rd Precinct has a lower major felony crime rate than in the 1990s, with total major felony complaints decreasing by 71.1% between 1990 and 2025. The precinct reported 7 murders, 52 rapes, 377 robberies, 749 felony assaults, 223 burglaries, 598 grand larcenies, and 208 grand larcenies auto in 2025.

== Fire safety ==
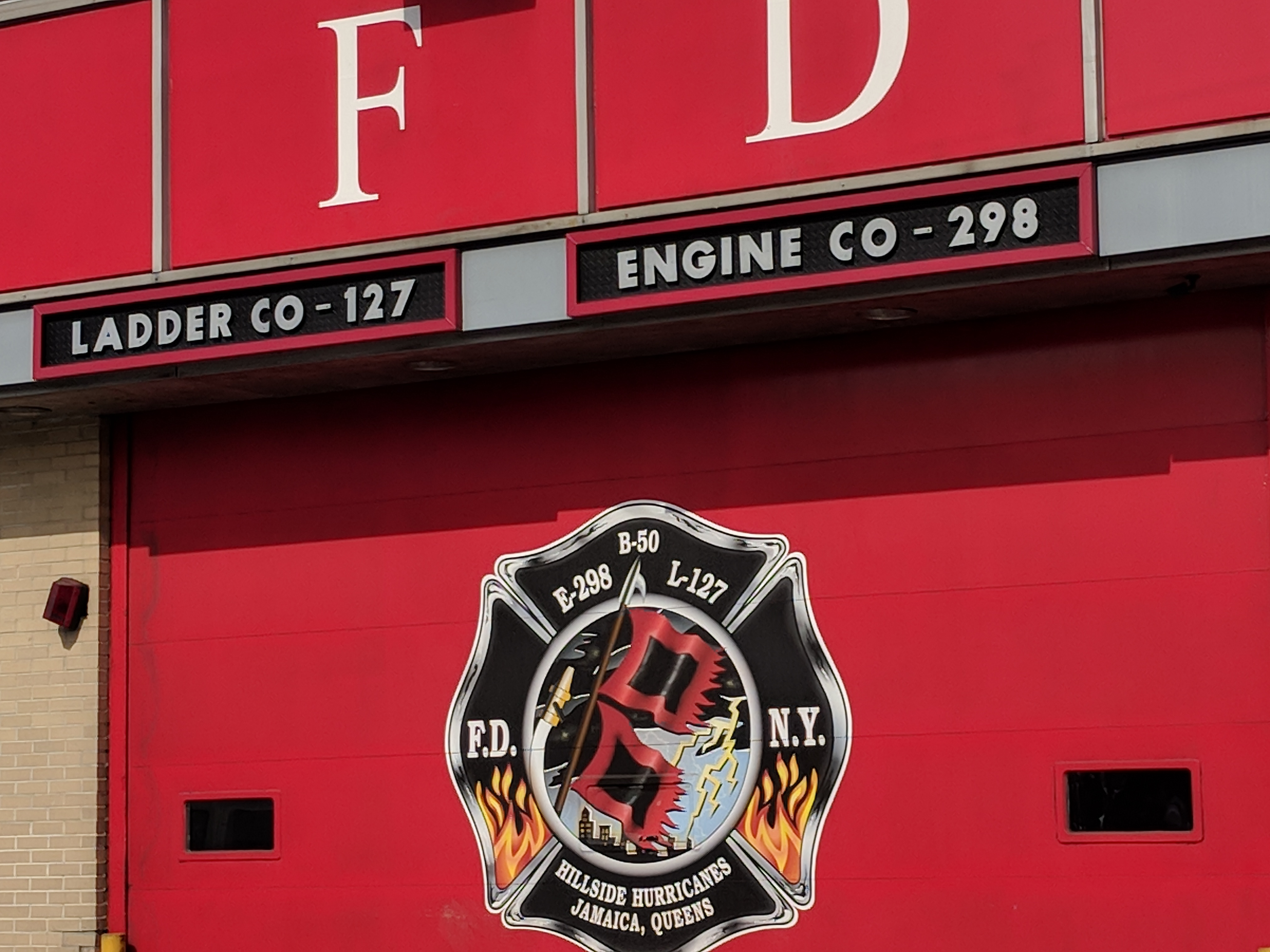
Engine Company 298/Ladder Company 127/Battalion 50

Jamaica contains four New York City Fire Department (FDNY) fire stations:

- Engine Company 275/Ladder Company 133 – 111-36 Merrick Boulevard
- Engine Company 298/Ladder Company 127/Battalion 50 – 153-11 Hillside Avenue
- Engine Company 302/Ladder Company 155 – 143-15 Rockaway Boulevard
- Engine Company 303/Ladder Company 126 – 104-12 Princeton Street

== Health ==
Major hospitals in Jamaica include Jamaica Hospital and Queens Hospital Center. As of 2018, preterm births and births to teenage mothers are more common in Jamaica and Hollis than in other places citywide. In Jamaica and Hollis, there were 100 preterm births per 1,000 live births (compared to 87 per 1,000 citywide), and 21.4 births to teenage mothers per 1,000 live births (compared to 19.3 per 1,000 citywide). Jamaica and Hollis have a low population of residents who are uninsured. In 2018, this population of uninsured residents was estimated to be 5%, lower than the citywide rate of 12%.

The concentration of fine particulate matter, the deadliest type of air pollutant, in Jamaica and Hollis is 0.007 milligrams per cubic metre (7.0×10^{−9} oz/ft^{3}), less than the city average.

	Jamaica and Hollis residents	Citywide average	ref
Smoking	8%	14%	
Obesity	30%	22%	
childhood obesity	23%	20%	
Diabetes	16%	8%	
high blood pressure	37%	23%	
eat some fruits and vegetables every day	86%	87%	
described their health as "good", "very good", or "excellent"	82%	78%	

For every supermarket in Jamaica and Hollis, there are 20 bodegas.

== Post offices and ZIP Codes ==
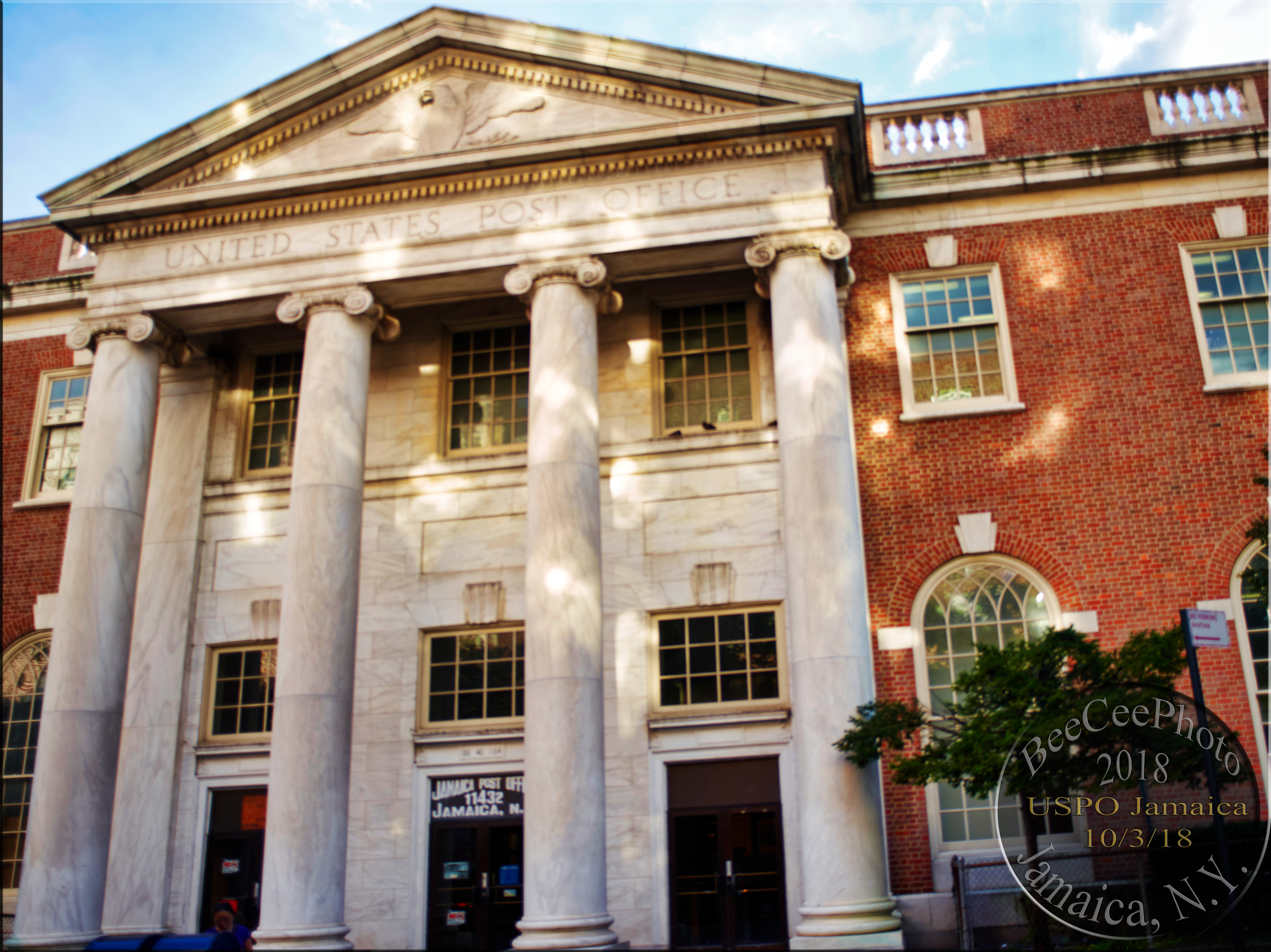
The front colonnade of the Jamaica Station post office

Jamaica is covered by multiple ZIP Codes. West of Sutphin Boulevard, Jamaica falls under ZIP Codes 11435 north of Linden Boulevard and 11436 south of Linden Boulevard. East of Sutphin Boulevard, Jamaica is part of three ZIP Codes: 11432 north of Jamaica Avenue, 11433 between Jamaica Avenue and Linden Boulevard, and 11434 south of Linden Boulevard. The United States Post Office operates four post offices nearby:

- Briarwood Station – 138-69 Queens Boulevard
- Jamaica Station – 88-40 164th Street
- Archer Avenue New Station – 97-03 Sutphin Boulevard
- Rochdale Village Station – 165-100 Baisley Boulevard

== Education ==
Hollis & Jamaica possess a lower rate of college-educated residents than the rest of the city as of 2018. While 29% of residents age 25 and older have a college education or higher, 19% have less than a high school education and 51% are high school graduates or have some college education. By contrast, 39% of Queens residents and 43% of city residents have a college education or higher. The percentage of Jamaica and Hollis students excelling in math rose from 36% in 2000 to 55% in 2011, and reading achievement increased slightly from 44% to 45% during the same time period.

Jamaica and Hollis's rate of elementary school student absenteeism is more than the rest of New York City. In Jamaica and Hollis, 22% of elementary school students missed twenty or more days per school year, higher than the citywide average of 20%. 74% of high school students in Jamaica and Hollis graduate on time, about the same as the citywide average of 75%.

=== Primary and secondary schools ===
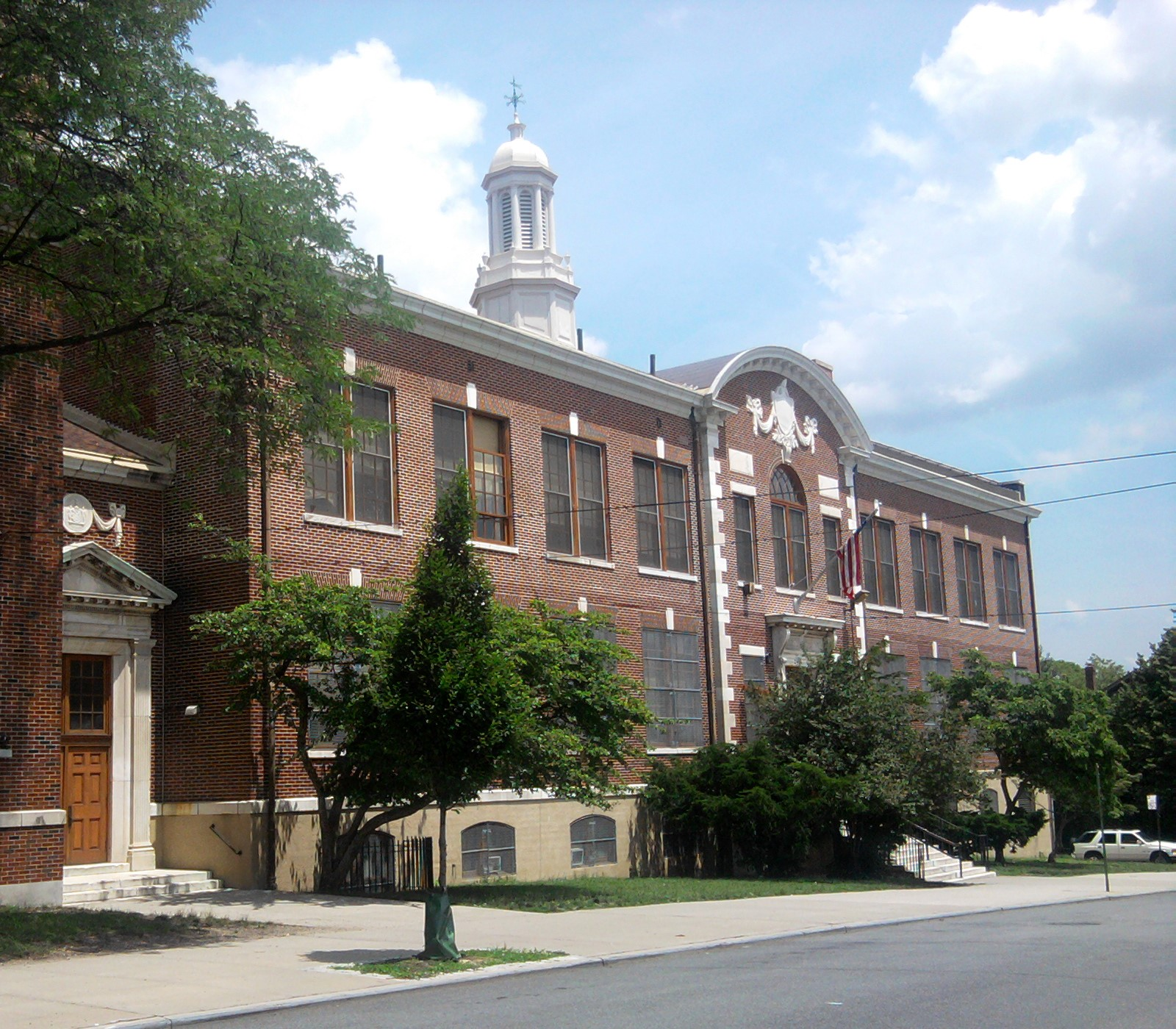
Abigail Adams School

==== Public schools ====
Jamaica's public schools are operated by the New York City Department of Education.

Public high schools in Jamaica include:

- Springfield Gardens Educational Campus (formerly Springfield Gardens High School)
- August Martin High School
- Eagle Academy for Young Men of Southeast Queens
- Thomas A. Edison Vocational and Technical High School
- Hillcrest High School
- Campus Magnet Educational Campus (formerly Andrew Jackson High School)
- Jamaica Campus (formerly Jamaica High School), an official municipal landmark
- Queens High School for the Sciences at York College, one of nine specialized high schools in the city
- Queens Gateway to Health Sciences Secondary School
- High School for Law Enforcement and Public Safety
- The Young Women's Leadership School of Queens
- York Early College Academy

Public elementary and middle schools in Jamaica include:

- PS 40 Samuel Huntington
- PS 45 Clarence Witherspoon
- PS 48 William Wordsworth
- PS 50 Talfourd Lawn
- PS 80 The Thurgood Marshall Magnet School of Multimedia and Communication
- PS 86
- PS 95 Eastwood
- PS 131 Abigail Adams
- PS 160 Walter Francis Bishop
- PS 182 Samantha Smith
- IS 238 Susan B Anthony
- JHS 8 Richard S. Grossley
- JHS 72 Catherine and Count Basie
- JHS 217 Robert A. Van Wyck
- MS 358

==== Private schools ====
Private schools in Jamaica include:

- Al-Iman School, an Islamic PK-12 school.
- Archbishop Molloy High School, formerly an all-boys' Catholic high school, now co-ed.
- Immaculate Conception School, a co-ed Catholic school from pre-K to 8th grade. The school is a local landmark located on the property of Immaculate Conception Church and Monastery, run by the Passionist Congregation of priests.
- Ss. Joachim and Anne School, a Catholic co-ed K-8 school in Queens Village, run by the Little Sisters of the Poor
- St. Nicholas of Tolentine, a co-ed Catholic school from pre-K to 8th grade, run by the Sisters of Charity
- The Mary Louis Academy, a Catholic girls' high school run by the Sisters of St. Joseph.
- United Nations International School, a private school in Jamaica Estates.
- Cariculum Academy Preschool of Southeast Queens, a community schoolhouse
- Our Lady's Catholic Academy, located in South Ozone Park. It is a co-ed school from nursery to grade 8

The Catholic schools are administered by the Roman Catholic Diocese of Brooklyn.

From its 1975 founding to around 1980, the Japanese School of New York was located in Jamaica Estates, near Jamaica.

=== Colleges and universities ===
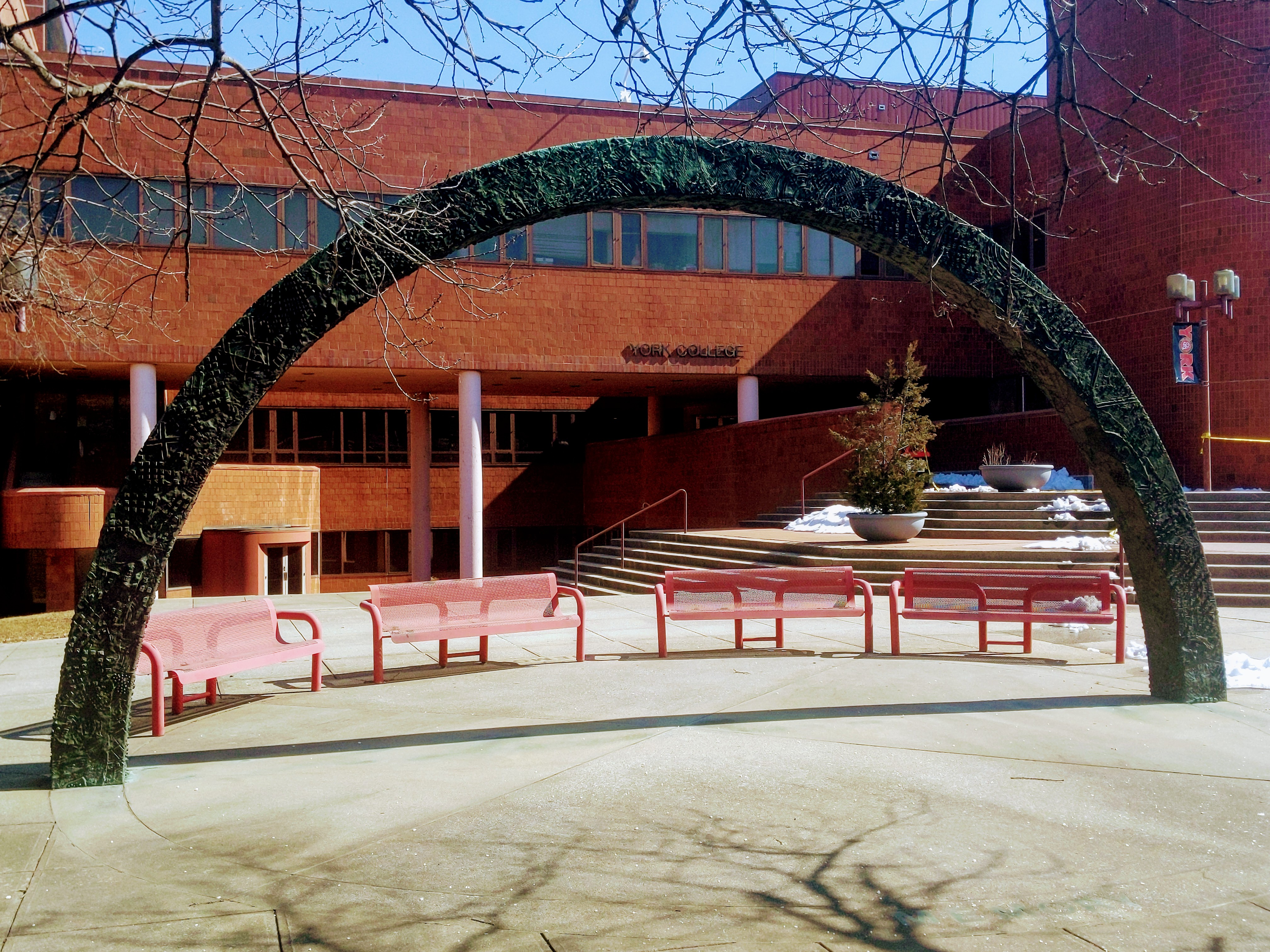
York College

Several colleges and universities make their home in Jamaica proper or in its close vicinity, most notably:

- York College, a senior college of the City University of New York
- St. John's University (Queens Campus), a private Catholic University founded by the Vincentian Fathers (Lazarists)
- Queens College, a nearby senior college of the City University of New York
- New Brunswick Theological Seminary offers classes at a satellite campus on the St. John's University campus.

=== Libraries ===
The Queens Public Library operates four branches in Jamaica:

- The Baisley Park branch at 117-11 Sutphin Boulevard
- The Central Library at 89-11 Merrick Boulevard
- The Rochdale Village branch at 169-09 137th Avenue
- The South Jamaica branch at 108-41 Guy R. Brewer Boulevard

An additional two branches are located nearby:

- The St. Albans branch at 191-05 Linden Boulevard
- The Briarwood branch at 85-12 Main Street

== Transportation ==
=== Public transport ===
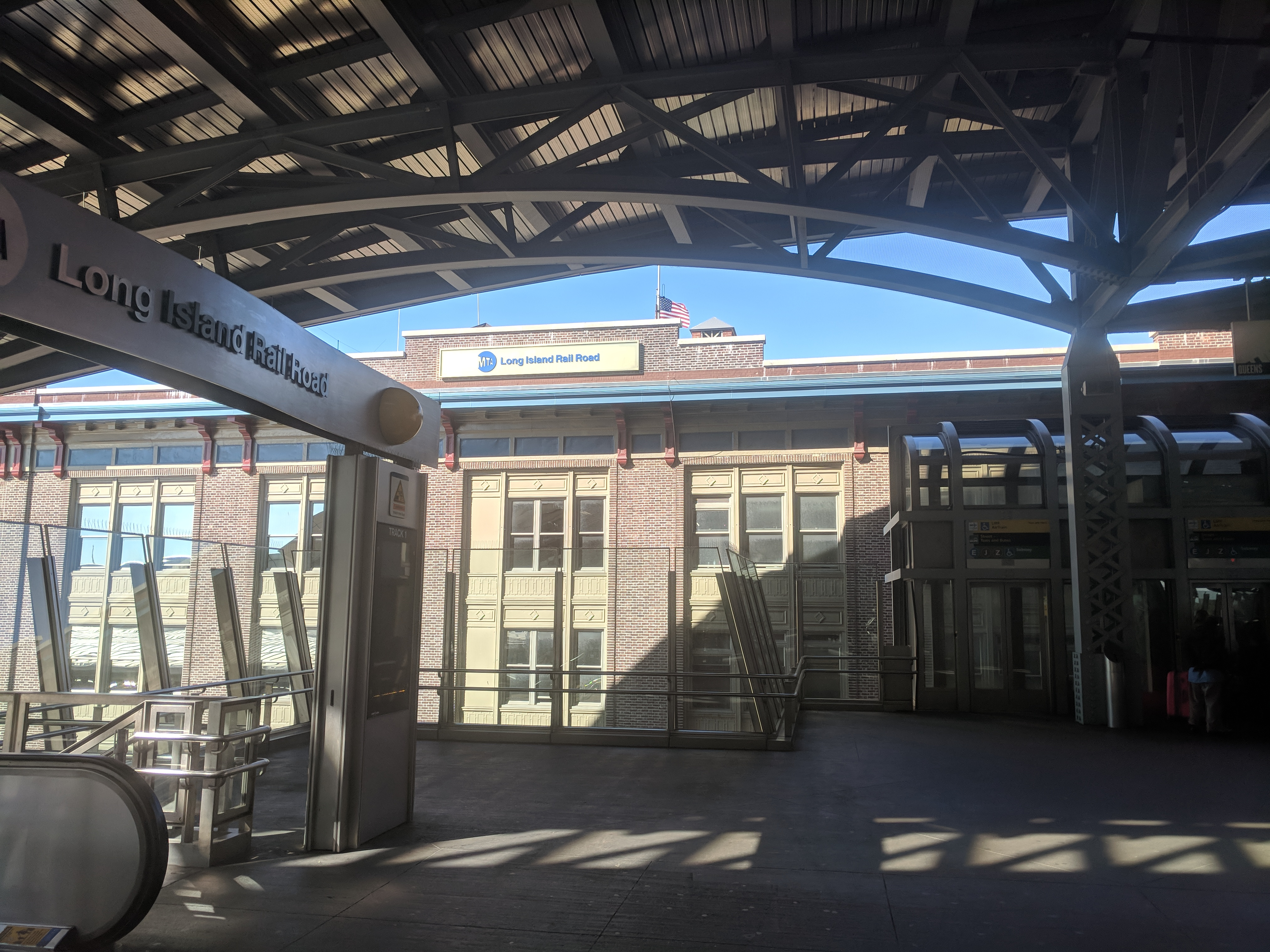
The LIRR station upper mezzanine

Jamaica station is a central transfer point on the LIRR which is headquartered in a building adjoining the station. All of the commuter railroad's passenger branches except for the Port Washington Branch run through the station. The New York City Subway's IND Queens Boulevard Line (E, F, and <F> trains) terminate at the 179th Street station, at the foot of Jamaica Estates, a neighborhood of mansions north of Jamaica's central business district. The Archer Avenue lines (E, J, and Z trains) serve Sutphin Boulevard–Archer Avenue–JFK Airport and Jamaica Center–York College stations. The Jamaica Yard, at the south end of Flushing Meadows–Corona Park, abuts Grand Central Parkway and the Van Wyck Expressway.

Jamaica's bus network provides extensive service across eastern Queens, as well as to points in Nassau County, the Bronx, the Rockaways, and Midtown Manhattan. Nearly all bus lines serving Jamaica terminate near either the Jamaica Bus Terminal or the Jamaica Center subway station, except for the Q45, Q46 and Q48 buses, which operate along Union Turnpike, at the northern border of Jamaica.

Greater Jamaica is home to John F. Kennedy International Airport, one of the busiest international airports in the United States and the world. Public transportation passengers are connected to airline terminals by AirTrain JFK, which operates as both an airport terminal circulator and rail connection to central Jamaica at the integrated LIRR and bi-level subway station located at Sutphin Blvd and Archer Avenue.

=== Major thoroughfares ===
Sutphin Boulevard in Jamaica is a major thoroughfare

Major streets include Archer Avenue, Hillside Avenue, Jamaica Avenue, Liberty Avenue, Merrick Boulevard, Rockaway Boulevard, Parsons Boulevard, Guy R. Brewer Boulevard (formerly known as New York Boulevard but renamed for a local political leader in 1982), Sutphin Boulevard, and Union Turnpike, as well as the Van Wyck Expressway (I-678) and the Grand Central Parkway.

Jamaica Avenue is Jamaica's busiest thoroughfare. It begins at Broadway Junction in Brooklyn, near the boundary of the East New York neighborhood. The Avenue enters Jamaica east of the Van Wyck Expressway, and passes the Joseph Addabbo Social Security Administration Building, courthouses and the main building of the Queens Public Library, along with many discount stores. The 200-year-old King Manor Museum, once home to Rufus King, a founding father of the United States, is located at the corner of 153rd St. and Jamaica Ave. It includes a 2-story museum with over an acre of land and a public park. Directly across from the Museum is the former First Reformed Dutch Church of Jamaica, a National Register of Historic Places-listed landmark that has been adaptively reused into the Jamaica Performing arts center.

Hillside Avenue is one of the main thoroughfares of Jamaica. It is served by the E, F, and <F> trains, from Sutphin Boulevard to its 179th Street terminus. Hillside Avenue runs east from Myrtle Avenue in Richmond Hill, along the length of Jamaica, into Queens Village, and finally, Nassau County. It is a wide six-lane street with numerous commercial activities. Hillside Avenue separates Jamaica from Briarwood, Jamaica Hills and Jamaica Estates on the southern boundary.

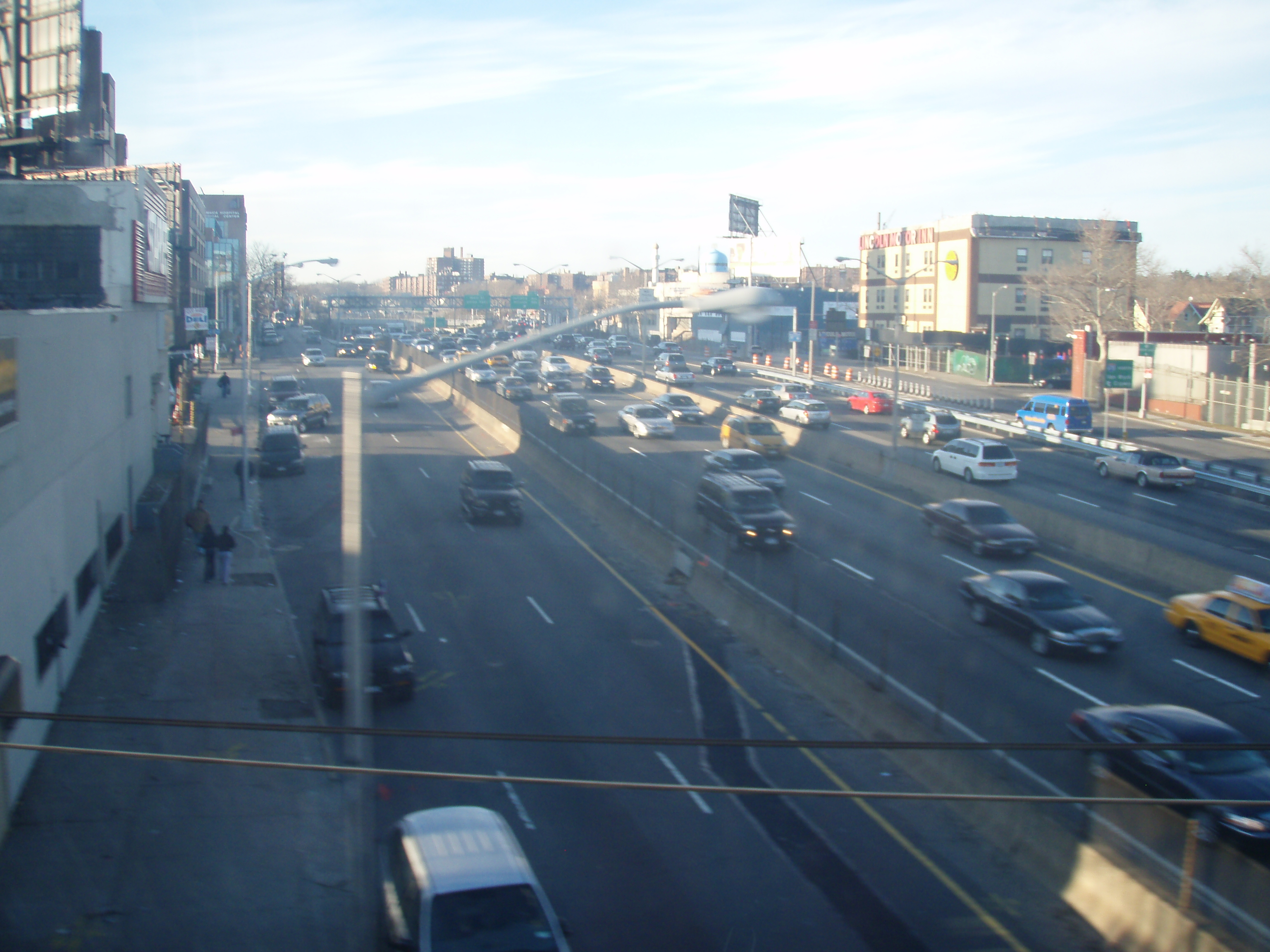
Interstate 678 (Van Wyck Expressway) in Jamaica

Sutphin Boulevard is Jamaica's second busiest thoroughfare. It has two subway stations, as well as stations for the LIRR and the AirTrain JFK, and two Queens courthouses. It begins at Hillside Avenue and 147th Place in the north and works its way south and downhill connecting with Jamaica Avenue, Archer Avenue, Liberty Avenue, South Road, Linden Boulevard, and terminates at Rockaway Boulevard. At first it is a small four-lane street, but in the downtown area it provides six lanes. At 95th Avenue, it reemerges from the LIRR underpass and becomes a four-lane street to its southern endpoint.

Union Turnpike travels through, and serving as the northern border between the towns of Flushing and Jamaica. Though both towns were absorbed into New York City in 1898, the division is evident today in the addresses. Buildings on the north side generally begin with a 113- ZIP Code, indicating Flushing, and buildings to the south side begin with a 114- ZIP Code, indicating Jamaica. Union Turnpike separates the northern boundaries of Briarwood, Jamaica Hills and Jamaica Estates from the southern boundaries of Flushing and Fresh Meadows.

Rockaway Boulevard begins at 90th Avenue and Elderts Lane in Woodhaven, continuing southeast through Ozone Park, South Ozone Park, South Jamaica, Springfield Gardens, Brookville, and Meadowmere. The segment between Farmers Boulevard in Springfield Gardens and the New York City border in Meadowmere connects the two discontinuous sections of New York State Route 878, the Nassau Expressway. In addition, Rockaway Boulevard abuts the northern border of JFK Airport between Farmers and Brookville Boulevards.

== Parks and recreation ==
Baisley Pond Park has over 100 acres (0.40 km^{2}) of outdoor recreational space, including a 30-acre (0.12 km^{2}) pond.

Flushing Meadows–Corona Park abuts Jamaica on its far northwestern corner. At 897 acres (363 ha), it is the fourth-largest public park in New York City. The southernmost part of the park is adjacent to Willow Lake, which is named for the many species of Willow plants which inhabit the area. The New York City Subway's Jamaica Yard is located at the very south end of the park site, beyond Willow Lake.

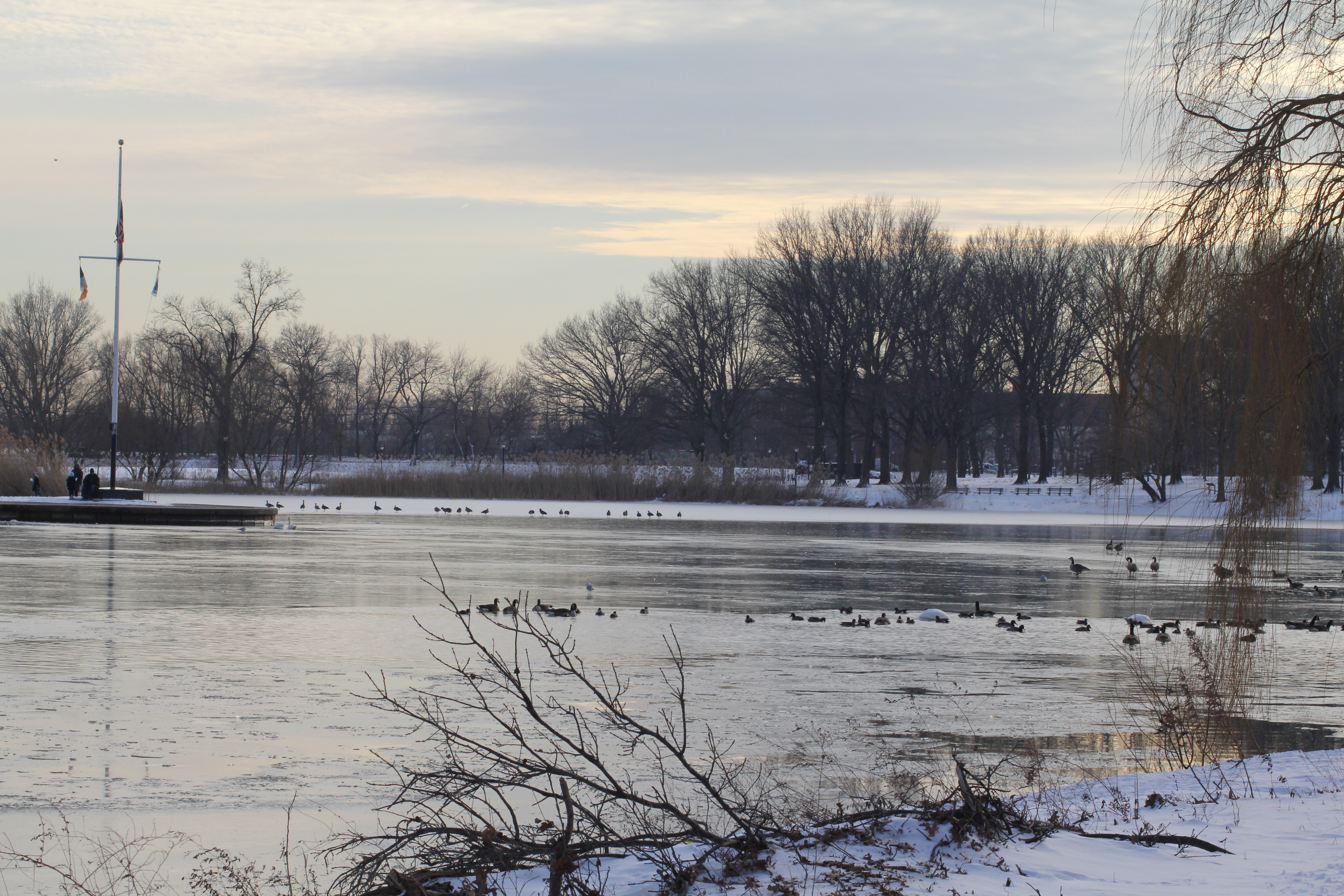
Baisley Pond Park

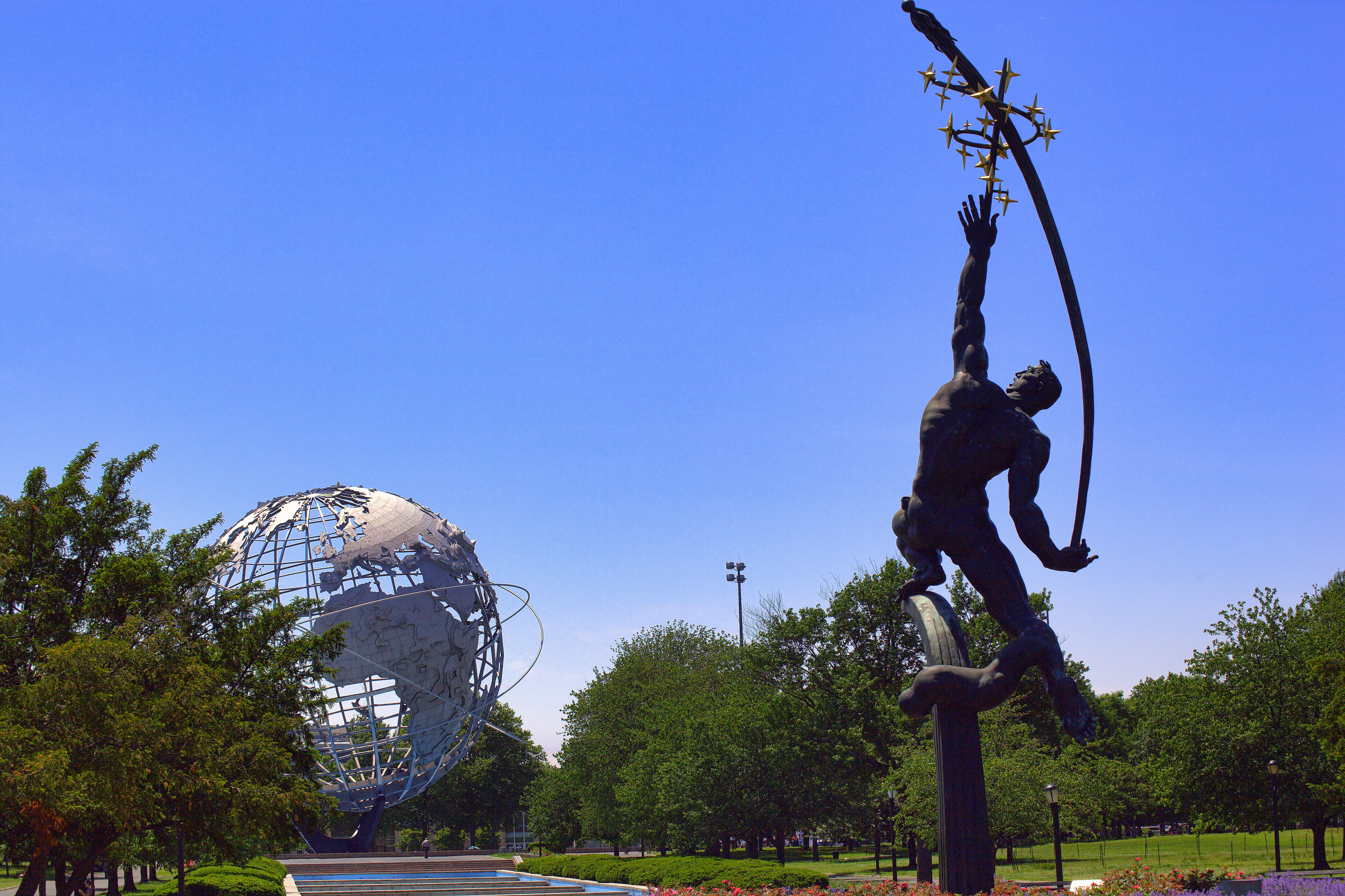
Flushing Meadows–Corona Park, the Rocket Thrower is a 1963 bronze sculpture by American sculptor Donald De Lue

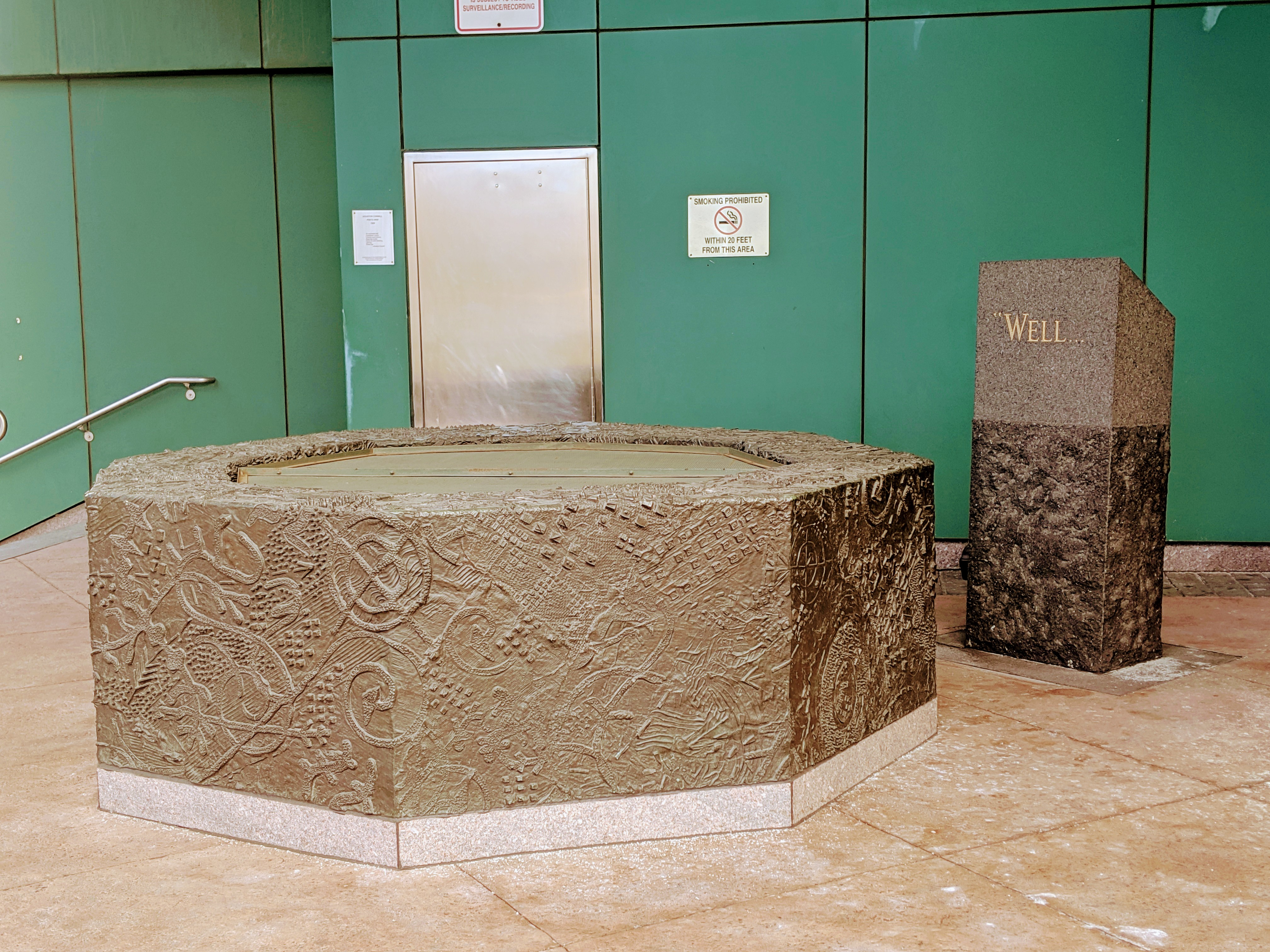
Poets Rise - Houston Conwill (1989) Exterior courtyard Jos P. Addabbo Federal Bldg, Well & Lectern

Other major parks near downtown Jamaica include:

- Captain Tilly Park, located in Jamaica Hills
- Detective Keith L. Williams Park
- Roy Wilkins Park, in St. Albans
- St. Albans Park

== Neighboring areas ==
Neighboring areas are Jamaica Estates, Jamaica Hills, Holliswood, Bellerose, Briarwood, Cambria Heights, St. Albans, Hollis, Queens Village, South Ozone Park, Kew Gardens, Richmond Hill, Laurelton, Rosedale, Brookville, Rochdale, South Jamaica, Springfield Gardens, Hillcrest, Kew Gardens Hills, Fresh Meadows, Meadowmere, Meadowmere Park, and Woodhaven.

== Notable residents ==
Notable current and former residents of Jamaica include:

- 50 Cent, rapper and entrepreneur (Note: Born in Jamaica, Queens)
- Cecily Adams, actress
- Khandi Alexander, actress and dancer
- Marilyn Aschner (born 1948), professional tennis player
- Lloyd Banks, rapper and member of hip-hop group G-Unit
- Bob Beamon, Olympian and world record holder for long jump
- Fritz Billig, stamp dealer and author of Billig's Philatelic Handbooks
- Don Blackman, jazz-funk pianist, singer and songwriter
- Paul Bowles, writer and composer
- Jimmy Breslin, author and columnist
- Harvey Brooks, musician and composer
- Camille A. Brown, Tony nominated choreographer
- Cal Bruton, basketball player
- Tina Charles, WNBA player currently with the Connecticut Sun
- Mr. Cheeks, rapper and member of hip-hop group Lost Boyz
- Sri Chinmoy, philosopher and spiritual teacher
- Chinx, rapper
- Buck Clayton, jazz trumpeter
- Desiree Coleman, singer, actress
- Mario Cuomo, former governor of New York 1983–1995
- Nelson DeMille, author
- Rocco DiSpirito, chef
- Alan Dugan, poet
- Ann Flood, actress
- Ashrita Furman, holder of the most Guinness World Records, with 88 Guinness World Records
- Alonzo Holt, singer
- Scott Ian, rhythm guitarist for Anthrax
- Marc Iavaroni, basketball player, former head coach of the Memphis Grizzlies
- K. Sparks, Christian hip hop musician
- Kamara James, Olympic fencer
- James P. Johnson, "stride" pianist and composer
- Crad Kilodney, writer
- Rufus King, signer of the United States Constitution
- Len Kunstadt, jazz/blues historian, record label owner
- Gerald S. Lesser (1926–2010), psychologist, Sesame Street programming developer
- Ivan Lee (born 1981), Olympic saber fencer; banned for life by SafeSport
- Jeffrey R. MacDonald, murderer
- Sally Marr (1906–1997), stand-up comic, dancer, actress and talent spotter, mother of comic Lenny Bruce, whose act she influenced
- Debi Mazar (born 1964), actress
- Darryl McDaniels (DMC), rapper
- Curtis McDowald (born 1996), fencer
- Metallica briefly lived here in April 1983 before recording their debut Kill 'Em All
- Marcus Miller, jazz composer, producer and multi-instrumentalist
- Nicki Minaj, rapper, born in Trinidad, brought to Queens at 5 years old
- Charles Mingus, jazz bassist, composer and autobiographer
- Dalilah Muhammad, Olympic track and field athlete, gold-medalist in 400m hurdles
- Lamar Odom, NBA star, former reality TV star
- Walter O'Malley, former owner of the Brooklyn and L.A. Dodgers. Lived in Jamaica from 1917 to 1920.
- Richard Parsons, former chairman of Citigroup and former chairman and CEO of Time Warner
- Pepa (born 1964 or 1969 as Sandra Denton), rapper and member of hip-hop group Salt-N-Pepa
- Phife Dawg, rapper and former member of A Tribe Called Quest
- Letty Cottin Pogrebin (born 1939), writer/journalist
- Q-Tip, rapper and record producer, member of A Tribe Called Quest
- Khalid Reeves, former NBA player
- Freddie Roman, comedian
- Al Sears, jazz saxophonist
- Assata Shakur, activist and convicted murderer
- Joseph Simmons (Run), rapper/pastor
- Russell Simmons, entrepreneur/producer
- Heathcliff Slocumb, former pitcher
- Fredro Starr, actor, rapper and member of hip-hop group Onyx
- William Grant Still, "dean of American black composers"
- Sticky Fingaz, actor, rapper and member of hip-hop group Onyx
- Eva Taylor, 1920s vocalist known as the "Dixie Nightingale"
- Bob Thompson, jazz pianist, composer and arranger
- Lennie Tristano, jazz pianist and composer
- Fred Trump, real estate developer and father of Donald Trump
- Donald Trump, real estate tycoon, reality television host and 45th and 47th President of the United States
- Ben Webster, jazz tenor saxophonist
- Marinus Willett, member of the Sons of Liberty, officer in the Continental Army during the American Revolutionary War, mayor of New York (1807–08)
- Clarence Williams, jazz pianist and composer
- Fess Williams, jazz clarinetist
- Bernard Wright, pop/funk/jazz composer, keyboardist and singer
- Tony Yayo, rapper and member of hip-hop group G-Unit
- Yung Fazo, born Fazan Munshi, American rapper and songwriter
- Richard W. Roberts, Chief Judge Emeritus, U.S. District Court, District of Columbia

== See also ==
- Masjid Al-Mamoor
