= New York's 33rd State Assembly district =

American legislative district

Assemblymember
| Clyde Vanel; D–Cambria Heights |
- Registration: 74.1% Democratic; 5.9% Republican; 17.4% No party preference
- Demographics: 7% White; 53% Black; 14% Hispanic; 18% Asian; 0% Native American; 0% Hawaiian/Pacific Islander; 4% Other
- Population (2020): 133,715
- Registered voters: 88,306

New York's 33rd State Assembly district is one of the 150 districts in the New York State Assembly. It has been represented by Clyde Vanel since 2017.

== Geography ==
=== 2020s ===
District 33 is located in Queens, comprising most of the neighborhoods of Cambria Heights and Queens Village, and portions of St. Albans, Hollis, Bellerose and Floral Park.

The district overlaps New York's 3rd and 5th congressional districts, as well as the 11th and 14th districts of the New York State Senate, and the 23rd and 27th districts of the New York City Council.

=== 2010s ===
District 33 is located in Queens, comprising most of the neighborhoods of Cambria Heights, St. Albans, Hollis, Queens Village, Bellerose and parts of Floral Park.

== Recent election results ==
=== 2026 ===
2026 New York State Assembly election, District 33
Primary election
| Party | Candidate | Votes | % |
|---|---|---|---|
| Democratic | Clyde Vanel (incumbent) | 3,710 | 70.9 |
| Democratic | Oster Bryan | 1,502 | 28.7 |
| Write-in | | 23 | 0.4 |
| Total votes | | 5,235 | 100.0 |
General election
| Democratic | Clyde Vanel (incumbent) | | |
| Working Families | Oster Bryan | | |
| Write-in | | | |
| Total votes | | | 100.0 |

=== 2024 ===
2024 New York State Assembly election, District 33
| Party | Candidate | Votes | % |
|---|---|---|---|
| Democratic | Clyde Vanel (incumbent) | 39,298 | 98.9 |
| Write-in | | 443 | 1.1 |
| Total votes | | 39,741 | 100.0 |
| Democratic hold | | | |

=== 2022 ===
2022 New York State Assembly election, District 33
Primary election
| Party | Candidate | Votes | % |
|---|---|---|---|
| Democratic | Clyde Vanel (incumbent) | 5,806 | 85.4 |
| Democratic | Oster Bryan | 972 | 14.3 |
| Write-in | | 20 | 0.3 |
| Total votes | | 6,798 | 100.0 |
General election
| Democratic | Clyde Vanel (incumbent) | 24,305 | 99.4 |
| Write-in | | 151 | 0.6 |
| Total votes | | 24,456 | 100.0 |
| Democratic hold | | | |

=== 2020 ===
2020 New York State Assembly election, District 33
Primary election
| Party | Candidate | Votes | % |
|---|---|---|---|
| Democratic | Clyde Vanel (incumbent) | 11,466 | 85.4 |
| Democratic | Oster Bryan | 1,927 | 14.4 |
| Write-in | | 30 | 0.2 |
| Total votes | | 13,423 | 100.0 |
General election
| Democratic | Clyde Vanel (incumbent) | 47,035 | 99.6 |
| Write-in | | 195 | 0.4 |
| Total votes | | 47,230 | 100.0 |
| Democratic hold | | | |

=== 2018 ===
2018 New York State Assembly election, District 33
Primary election
| Party | Candidate | Votes | % |
|---|---|---|---|
| Democratic | Clyde Vanel (incumbent) | 11,274 | 79.7 |
| Democratic | Oster Bryan | 2,849 | 20.1 |
| Write-in | | 27 | 0.3 |
| Total votes | | 14,150 | 100.0 |
| Reform | Lalita Etwaroo | 91 | 49.5 |
| Reform | Oster Bryan | 78 | 42.4 |
| Reform | Clyde Vanel (incumbent, write-in) | 11 | 6.0 |
| Write-in | | 4 | 2.1 |
| Total votes | | 184 | 100.0 |
General election
| Democratic | Clyde Vanel | 32,009 | |
| Working Families | Clyde Vanel | 649 | |
| Total | Clyde Vanel (incumbent) | 32,658 | 91.6 |
| Republican | Lalita Etwaroo | 2,527 | |
| Conservative | Lalita Etwaroo | 353 | |
| Reform | Lalita Etwaroo | 85 | |
| Total | Lalita Etwaroo | 2,965 | 8.3 |
| Write-in | | 35 | 0.1 |
| Total votes | | 35,658 | 100.0 |
| Democratic hold | | | |

=== 2016 ===
2016 New York State Assembly election, District 33
Primary election
| Party | Candidate | Votes | % |
|---|---|---|---|
| Democratic | Clyde Vanel | 1,822 | 32.3 |
| Democratic | Nantasha Williams | 1,590 | 28.2 |
| Democratic | Bryan Block | 1,402 | 24.9 |
| Democratic | Roy Paul | 599 | 10.6 |
| Democratic | Sabine French | 204 | 3.6 |
| Write-in | | 22 | 0.4 |
| Total votes | | 5,639 | 100.0 |
General election
| Democratic | Clyde Vanel | 40,212 | 88.2 |
| Republican | Goldy-Francois Wellington | 3,854 | |
| Conservative | Goldy-Francois Wellington | 596 | |
| Total | Goldy-Francois Wellington | 4,450 | 9.8 |
| New Ideas | Leroy Gadsden | 914 | 2.0 |
| Write-in | | 31 | 0.0 |
| Total votes | | 45,607 | 100.0 |
| Democratic hold | | | |

=== 2014 ===
2014 New York State Assembly election, District 33
| Party | Candidate | Votes | % |
|---|---|---|---|
| Democratic | Barbara M. Clark | 15,108 | |
| Working Families | Barbara M. Clark | 871 | |
| Total | Barbara M. Clark (incumbent) | 15,979 | 99.5 |
| Write-in | | 79 | 0.5 |
| Total votes | | 16,058 | 100.0 |
| Democratic hold | | | |

=== 2012 ===
2012 New York State Assembly election, District 33
Primary election
| Party | Candidate | Votes | % |
|---|---|---|---|
| Democratic | Barbara M. Clark (incumbent) | 3,184 | 63.8 |
| Democratic | Clyde Vanel | 1,807 | 36.2 |
| Write-in | | 2 | 0.0 |
| Total votes | | 4,993 | 100.0 |
General election
| Democratic | Barbara M. Clark | 33,795 | |
| Working Families | Barbara M. Clark | 769 | |
| Total | Barbara M. Clark (incumbent) | 34,564 | 89.4 |
| More Jobs | Clyde Vanel | 4,093 | 10.6 |
| Write-in | | 18 | 0.0 |
| Total votes | | 38,675 | 100.0 |
| Democratic hold | | | |

=== 2010 ===
2010 New York State Assembly election, District 33
Primary election
| Party | Candidate | Votes | % |
|---|---|---|---|
| Democratic | Barbara M. Clark (incumbent) | 3,539 | 66.6 |
| Democratic | Clyde Vanel | 1,773 | 33.4 |
| Write-in | | 3 | 0.0 |
| Total votes | | 5,315 | 100.0 |
General election
| Democratic | Barbara M. Clark | 20,240 | |
| Working Families | Barbara M. Clark | 1,321 | |
| Total | Barbara M. Clark (incumbent) | 21,561 | 99.9 |
| Write-in | | 22 | 0.1 |
| Total votes | | 21,583 | 100.0 |
| Democratic hold | | | |

=== 2008 ===
2008 New York State Assembly election, District 33
| Party | Candidate | Votes | % |
|---|---|---|---|
| Democratic | Barbara M. Clark | 32,780 | |
| Working Families | Barbara M. Clark | 810 | |
| Total | Barbara M. Clark (incumbent) | 33,590 | 100.0 |
| Write-in | | 2 | 0.0 |
| Total votes | | 33,592 | 100.0 |
| Democratic hold | | | |

=== 2006 ===
2006 New York State Assembly election, District 33
| Party | Candidate | Votes | % |
|---|---|---|---|
| Democratic | Barbara M. Clark | 16,065 | |
| Working Families | Barbara M. Clark | 928 | |
| Total | Barbara M. Clark (incumbent) | 16,993 | 100.0 |
| Write-in | | 3 | 0.0 |
| Total votes | | 16,996 | 100.0 |
| Democratic hold | | | |

=== 2004 ===
2004 New York State Assembly election, District 33
| Party | Candidate | Votes | % |
|---|---|---|---|
| Democratic | Barbara M. Clark | 29,103 | |
| Working Families | Barbara M. Clark | 1,031 | |
| Total | Barbara M. Clark (incumbent) | 30,134 | 100.0 |
| Write-in | | 0 | 0.0 |
| Total votes | | 30,134 | 100.0 |
| Democratic hold | | | |

=== 2002 ===
2002 New York State Assembly election, District 33
| Party | Candidate | Votes | % |
|---|---|---|---|
| Democratic | Barbara M. Clark | 16,789 | |
| Working Families | Barbara M. Clark | 940 | |
| Liberal | Barbara M. Clark | 224 | |
| Total | Barbara M. Clark (incumbent) | 17,953 | 85.6 |
| Republican | Rolaine Antoine | 2,306 | |
| Independence | Rolaine Antoine | 371 | |
| Conservative | Rolaine Antoine | 354 | |
| Total | Rolaine Antoine | 3,031 | 14.4 |
| Write-in | | 1 | 0.0 |
| Total votes | | 20,985 | 100.0 |
| Democratic hold | | | |

=== 2000 ===
2000 New York State Assembly election, District 33
| Party | Candidate | Votes | % |
|---|---|---|---|
| Democratic | Barbara M. Clark | 30,866 | |
| Liberal | Barbara M. Clark | 664 | |
| Total | Barbara M. Clark | 31,530 | 89.1 |
| Republican | Robert Hutchison | 3,224 | |
| Conservative | Robert Hutchison | 390 | |
| Independence | Robert Hutchison | 237 | |
| Total | Robert Hutchison | 3,851 | 10.9 |
| Write-in | | 0 | 0.0 |
| Total votes | | 35,381 | 100.0 |
| Democratic hold | | | |

=== Federal results in Assembly District 33 ===
| Year | Office | Results |
|---|---|---|
| 2024 | President | Harris 79.3 - 19.6% |
| 2024 | Senate | Gillibrand 76.1 - 21.8% |
| 2022 | Senate | Schumer 84.1 - 15.4% |
| 2020 | President | Biden 86.2 - 13.0% |
| 2018 | Senate | Gillibrand 91.7 - 8.0% |
| 2016 | President | Clinton 87.6 - 10.5% |
| 2016 | Senate | Schumer 91.2 - 7.5% |
| 2012 | President | Obama 91.0 - 8.6% |
| 2012 | Senate | Gillibrand 92.7 - 6.7% |
