= Andrew Jenkins (politician) =

American politician (born 1941)

Member of the New York State Senate from the 10th district
- In office January 1, 1983 – May 8, 1990
- Preceded by: Open seat (redistricting)
- Succeeded by: Alton Waldon

Member of the New York State Assembly from the 29th district
- In office January 1, 1979 – December 31, 1982
- Preceded by: Guy Brewer
- Succeeded by: Cynthia Jenkins

Personal details
- Born: June 27, 1941 Brooklyn, New York
- Party: Democratic

Andrew J. Jenkins (born June 27, 1941) is an American lawyer and politician from New York.

== Life ==
He was born on June 27, 1941, in Brooklyn, New York City. He graduated B.A. in social sciences from Fordham University in 1969, and J.D. from Fordham Law School in 1972. He was admitted to the bar in 1974. He also entered politics as a Democrat, and was an Assistant D.A. of Queens County, and a Deputy Buildings Commissioner of New York City.

He was a member of the New York State Assembly from 1979 to 1982, sitting in the 183rd and 184th New York State Legislatures; and a member of the New York State Senate from 1983 to 1990, sitting in the 185th, 186th, 187th and 188th New York State Legislatures. He was a delegate to the 1984 Democratic National Convention. On June 10, 1986, he ran on the Liberal ticket for Congress in the 6th District, to fill the vacancy caused by the death of Joseph P. Addabbo, but was defeated by Democrat Alton Waldon.

On August 1, 1987, Jenkins was arrested at the Plaza Hotel with $150,000 in cash in his possession. He had received the money from an undercover F.B.I. agent who posed as a shady businessman. Jenkins had told the agent that he co-owned a bank in Zaire where he could launder the money. On September 29, 1987, Jenkins was indicted by a federal grand jury. In November 1988, he was re-elected to the State Senate. On May 7, 1990, Jenkins was convicted in the United States District Court for the Southern District of New York of accepting deposits without being authorized to engage in banking (under the Glass–Steagall Act) and of using the telephone in interstate and foreign commerce with the intent to promote a crime, both felonies. On the next day, Jenkins's Senate seat was declared vacant by Temporary President Ralph J. Marino. On July 26, 1990, he was sentenced to one year and one day in jail. On March 19, 1991, Jenkins lodged an appeal with the United States Court of Appeals for the Second Circuit. On August 13, 1991, the verdict was upheld. On October 7, 1991, Jenkins was disbarred by the Appellate Division.

On March 28, 2000, he ran on the Liberal ticket in the special election to fill the vacancy caused by the appointment of State Senator Alton Waldon to the Court of Claims, but was defeated by Democrat Malcolm Smith. At that time Jenkins did administrative work at CUNY York College.

New York State Assembly
Preceded by Guy Brewer	New York State Assembly; 29th district 1979–1982	Succeeded by Cynthia Jenkins
New York State Senate
Preceded by Jeremy S. Weinstein	New York State Senate; 10th district 1983–1990	Succeeded by Alton Waldon
