= New York's 29th State Assembly district =

Assemblymember
Alicia Hyndman; D–Rosedale
- Registration: 77.8% Democratic; 3.9% Republican; 15.9% No party preference
- Demographics: 2% White; 65% Black; 11% Hispanic; 25% Asian; 0% Native American; 0% Hawaiian/Pacific Islander; 3% Other; 3% Multiracial
- Population (2020): 129,450
- Registered voters: 83,713

New York's 29th State Assembly district is one of the 150 districts in the New York State Assembly in the United States. It has been represented by Democrat Alicia Hyndman since 2016.

== Geography ==
=== 2020s ===
District 29 is located in Queens, containing most of the neighborhoods of Jamaica, Hollis, Springfield Gardens, Rosedale, Laurelton, and St. Albans. It also contains a portion of Locust Manor.

The district overlaps with New York's 5th congressional district, the 10th, 11th and 14th districts of the New York State Senate, and the 23rd, 24th, 27th, 28th and 31st districts of the New York City Council.

=== 2010s ===
District 29 is located in Queens, comprising the neighborhoods of Jamaica, Hollis, Springfield Gardens, Rosedale, Laurelton, and St. Albans.

== Recent election results ==
=== 2026 ===
2026 New York State Assembly election, District 29
Party	Candidate	Votes	%
Democratic	Alicia Hyndman		
Working Families	Alicia Hyndman		
Total	Alicia Hyndman (incumbent)		
Write-in			
Total votes			100.0

=== 2024 ===
2024 New York State Assembly election, District 29
Party	Candidate	Votes	%
Democratic	Alicia Hyndman (incumbent)	37,110	85.8
Republican	Dwayne Moore	6,015	13.9
Write-in		142	0.3
Total votes		43,267	100.0
Democratic hold			

=== 2022 ===
2022 New York State Assembly election, District 29
Primary election
Party	Candidate	Votes	%
Democratic	Alicia Hyndman (incumbent)	5,650	79.5
Democratic	Everly Brown	1,435	20.2
Write-in		21	0.3
Total votes		7,106	100.0
General election
Democratic	Alicia Hyndman	23,124	
Working Families	Alicia Hyndman	821	
Total	Alicia Hyndman (incumbent)	23,945	99.8
Write-in		52	0.2
Total votes		23,997	100.0
Democratic hold			

=== 2020 ===
2020 New York State Assembly election, District 29
Party	Candidate	Votes	%
Democratic	Alicia Hyndman (incumbent)	45,687	99.8
Write-in		103	0.2
Total votes		45,790	100.0
Democratic hold			

=== 2018 ===
2018 New York State Assembly election, District 29
Party	Candidate	Votes	%
Democratic	Alicia Hyndman	32,352	
Working Families	Alicia Hyndman	585	
Total	Alicia Hyndman (incumbent)	32,937	99.9
Write-in		36	0.1
Total votes		32,973	100.0
Democratic hold			

=== 2016 ===
2016 New York State Assembly election, District 29
Primary election
Party	Candidate	Votes	%
Democratic	Alicia Hyndman (incumbent)	3,057	71.9
Democratic	Lorraine Bridges	888	20.9
Democratic	Linda Guillebeaux	270	6.3
Write-in		38	0.9
Total votes		4,253	100.0
General election
Democratic	Alicia Hyndman	40,594	
Working Families	Alicia Hyndman	992	
Total	Alicia Hyndman (incumbent)	41,586	99.9
Write-in		45	0.1
Total votes		41,631	100.0
Democratic hold			

=== 2015 Special Election ===
Incumbent William Scarborough resigned his seat on May 7, 2015 after pleading guilty on state corruption charges, triggering a special election. In special elections for state legislative offices, primaries are usually not held – county committee members and district leaders for each party select nominees.

2015 New York State Assembly Special election, District 29
Party	Candidate	Votes	%
Democratic	Alicia Hyndman	4,045	91.4
Republican	Scherie Murray	281	
Reform	Scherie Murray	31	
Total	Scherie Murray	312	7.0
Write-in		71	1.6
Total votes		4,428	100.0
Democratic hold			

=== 2014 ===
2014 New York State Assembly election, District 29
Party	Candidate	Votes	%
Democratic	William Scarborough	14,749	
Working Families	William Scarborough	515	
Total	William Scarborough (incumbent)	15,264	99.8
Write-in		36	0.2
Total votes		15,300	100.0
Democratic hold			

=== 2012 ===
2012 New York State Assembly election, District 29
Party	Candidate	Votes	%
Democratic	William Scarborough	36,004	
Working Families	William Scarborough	492	
Total	William Scarborough (incumbent)	36,496	99.9
Write-in		10	0.0
Total votes		36,506	100.0
Democratic hold			

=== Federal results in Assembly District 29 ===
Year	Office	Results
2024	President	Harris 83.1 - 15.3%
2024	Senate	Gillibrand 85.7 - 13.5%
2022	Senate	Schumer 91.4 - 8.2%
2020	President	Biden 92.0 - 7.5%
2018	Senate	Gillibrand 96.6 - 3.4%
2016	President	Clinton 93.6 – 4.8%
2016	Senate	Schumer 94.6 - 4.0%
2012	President	Obama 96.5 - 3.3%
2012	Senate	Gillibrand 96.7 - 2.9%
