= Alicia Hyndman =

American politician

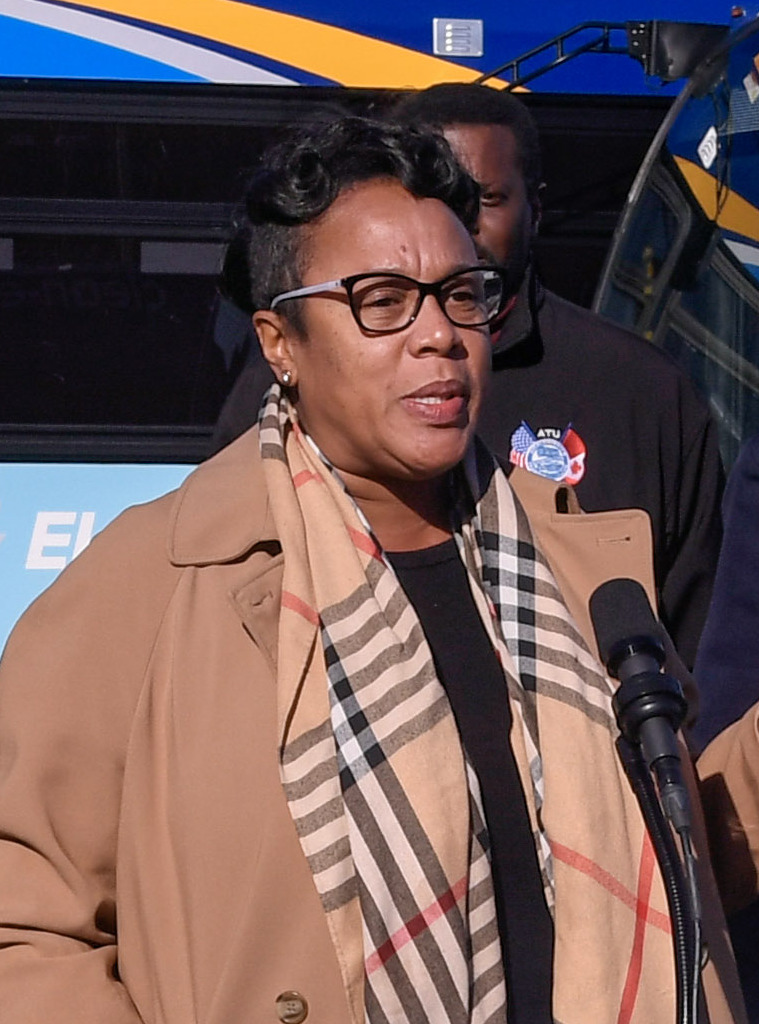
- Hyndman in 2021

Member of the New York State Assembly from the 29th district
- Incumbent
- Assumed office 10 January 2016
- Preceded by: William Scarborough

Personal details
- Born: 5 August 1971 (age 55) London, England, United Kingdom
- Party: Democratic
- Children: 2
- Education: State University of New York, New Paltz (BA); Framingham State University (MPA)
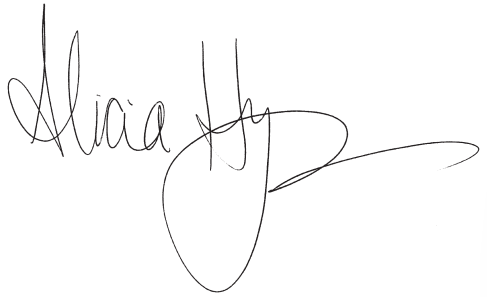
- Signature
- Website: State Assembly website

Alicia L. Hyndman is the Assembly member for the 29th District of the New York State Assembly. She is a Democrat. The district includes portions of Laurelton, Rosedale, St. Albans, Addisleigh Park, Hollis, Springfield Gardens and Jamaica in Queens.

== Life and career ==
Hyndman was born in London, England to parents who had immigrated from the Caribbean. The family moved when she was young to New York City, where they settled in the Queens neighborhoods of Hollis, and subsequently South Ozone Park. She would attend public schools, graduating from John Adams High School.

She received a Bachelor of Arts degree from SUNY New Paltz and later a Master of Public Administration from Framingham State College in Massachusetts. She worked in education policy at the New York State Department of Education, Brooklyn College, and the New York College of Osteopathic Medicine.

Hyndman served as President of the Community District Education Council 29 - a group of volunteer parents that advise the NYC School Chancellor on dozens of schools in Southeast Queens. As President of CDEC 29, she organized opposition to co-location proposals throughout her school district including I.S.59Q and P.S.15Q Under her leadership, CDEC 29 also voted to approve 'middle school choice' which allows parents in the school district to select from any middle school in their area. She also helped to lobby for the construction of a new school in the heart of St. Albans after a local Catholic school closed.

Hyndman resides in Rosedale, Queens with her two daughters.

== New York Assembly ==
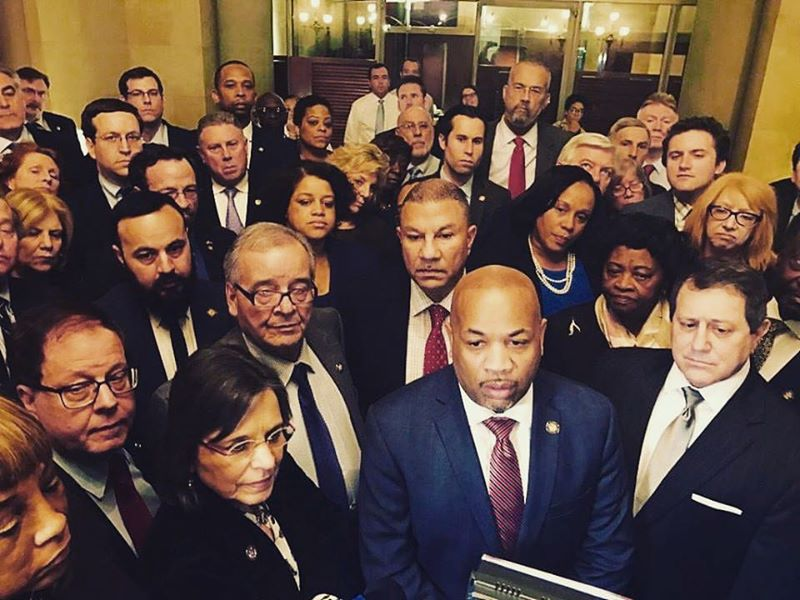
NYS Assembly Speaker Carl Heastie leads a press conference with his Democratic Conference following negotiations with Governor Cuomo and Senate Leader John Flanagan (R-Suffolk)

=== Elections ===
In 2015, Assemblyman William Scarborough was convicted of a felony for the inappropriate use of state funds, and as a result was forced to relinquish his seat in the Assembly. With a special election called, Hyndman was nominated by the Queens Democratic Party to replace him. Facing nominal opposition, Hyndman went on to win the seat on 3 November 2015 with 91.35% of the vote.

She was sworn into office on 10 January 2016. She won re-election in 2016 unopposed.

As of March 25, 2026, she has held the office for over 10 years.

=== Policy and innitiatives ===
Since her re-election she has partnered with several other local elected officials and the PTA to prevent the co-location of I.S.109Q with a high school.

During negotiations for the FY2017-2018 State Budget, Hyndman was a part of group of Assembly Members of color who successfully pushed Assembly Speaker Carl Heastie and Governor Andrew Cuomo to include legislation to raise the age of criminal prosecution from age 16 to 18 for non-violent felonies.

Since her election to the New York State Assembly, Hyndman has worked closely with NYS Senator Leroy Comrie, NYS Senator James Sanders Jr., and Council Member Daneek Miller to develop a "Freedom Ticket" pilot program in Southeast Queens to address the transit desert. Local residents would be allowed a reduced fare to ride the Long Island Rail Road to Atlantic Terminal with free transfer to the buses and subways. Hyndman has also passed state legislation that allows New York City to give out as much as $150,000 to Minority & Women-owned Business Enterprises (MWBE) without a competitive bidding process in an attempt to promote minority businesses.
