= Nantasha Williams =

American politician

- Williams speaking in 2026

Deputy Speaker of the New York City Council
- Incumbent
- Assumed office January 15, 2026
- Preceded by: Diana Ayala

Member of the New York City Council from the 27th district
- Incumbent
- Assumed office January 1, 2022
- Preceded by: Daneek Miller

Personal details
- Born: March 29, 1988 (age 38) New York City, New York, U.S.
- Party: Democratic
- Education: Virginia Commonwealth University (BA); State University of New York, Albany (MPA); City University of New York (PhD)
- Website: Official website Campaign website

Nantasha M. Williams (born March 29, 1988) is an American politician from New York City. A Democrat, Williams represents the 27th district in the New York City Council, which covers parts of southeastern Queens. She was appointed Deputy Speaker of the City Council in January 2026.

== Early life and education ==
Williams was born in Queens, and was raised by a single mother who worked as a social worker in the Southeast area of Queens. She received a BA from Virginia Commonwealth University, an MPA from SUNY Albany, and a PhD from the CUNY Graduate Center.

== Career ==
Prior to seeking elected office herself, Williams held a number of staff roles in the office of Assemblywoman Diana Richardson, eventually rising to become Richardson's chief of staff. Williams was also appointed as the executive director of New York State's Black, Puerto Rican, Hispanic and Asian Legislative Caucus, which represents state assemblymembers and senators of color.

=== 2016 State Assembly campaign ===
In 2016, after the death of Assemblywoman Barbara Clark, Williams announced she would run for the 33rd district of the New York State Assembly in southeastern Queens. She faced Clyde Vanel, who had run for the seat twice before, and three other candidates in the Democratic primary. Vanel ultimately defeated Williams by a narrow margin, 32-28%, and went on to win the seat in the general election.

=== 2021 City Council election ===
Four years after her Assembly campaign, with incumbent City Councilman Daneek Miller term-limited, Williams launched her campaign for the 27th district of the New York City Council, a heavily overlapping constituency. Williams received endorsements from Assemblywoman Alicia Hyndman and nearly all of the city's major unions, but many other power players remained neutral among the crowded race's twelve contenders.

On primary election night on June 22, Williams emerged with a strong lead, earning 36 percent of the vote while her nearest competitor was far behind with 11 percent; she officially won two weeks later, after ranked-choice votes and absentee ballots were counted. She ran uncontested in the November general election, and was elected. She assumed office on January 1, 2022.

=== First Term (2022-2023) ===
Shortly after being elected, Council Member Williams was appointed to Chair of the NYC Council's Committee on Civil and Human Rights, and sit on the following committees: Economic Development, General Welfare, Mental Health, Disabilities, and Addictions, Oversight and Investigations, Sanitation and Solid Waste Management, Transportation and Infrastructure, and Youth Services. Council Member Williams would transition out of the Economic Development Committee, Sanitation and Solid Waste Management Committee, and Youth Services Committee to the powerful Finance Committee overseeing the NYC budget.

During her first year in the City Council, Council Member Williams helped pass historic legislation requiring many ads for jobs in the nation’s most populous city to include salary ranges, in the name of giving job applicants — particularly women and people of color — a better shot at fair pay. During this same year, following a horrendous fire that claimed the lives of 17 people in the Bronx, the City Council passed her legislation requiring inspections for self-closing doors in residential buildings which was a major factor in this loss of life.

Council Member Williams also championed a resolution calling for the NYS Legislature to pass the Clean Slate Act - New Yorkers would be eligible to have their records automatically sealed 3 years from sentencing misdemeanors and 7 years for felonies. To be eligible for this relief, individuals must have completed probation, parole, or post-release supervision. They cannot have incurred any new convictions during the three- or seven-year waiting period. The Clean Slate Act would ultimately pass and be signed into law by Governor Kathy Hochul the following year.

During her second year in office, Council Member Williams passed two resolutions in honor of the 50th Anniversary of Hip-Hop including a resolution recognizing August as the Hip-Hop Recognition Month and December as Hip-Hop History Month, and a second resolution recognizing Def Jam Recordings for their contributions to the genre. Council Member Williams was also able to secure major investments in the New York City budget for her district including $3.8 million to redesign a local park neighboring PS.176Q, $2.8 million for crucial resilience upgrades in the Cambria Heights Library, and $2.755 million for the reconstruction and revitalization of the playground that was heavily damaged during Hurricane Ida.

Council Member also launched the Jamaica Neighborhood Plan, in partnership with New York City Department of City Planning, Queens Borough President Donovan Richards and Speaker Adrienne Adams, to create a grassroots vision for the future of the Downtown Jamaica and Hollis area that includes more affordable housing and investments to improve the quality of life. The Jamaica Neighborhood Plan aims to create a vision driven by the local community for Jamaica’s future where the community has more people able to live, work and play in the area. The Plan focuses on the downtown Jamaica area, around a 300-block radius and includes transportation corridors, manufacturing districts, institutions and community parks and transportation.

=== Second Term (2025-Present) ===
Unchallenged in the 2025 New York City Council election for District 27, Williams secured her second term as Council Member on November 4, 2025. On November 25, 2025, Councilwoman Nantasha Williams (D-Queens) pushed a bill to raise Council Members' salaries from $148,500 to $172,500. This bill faced controversy as the median household income in New York City is $79,713 and this bill only improves affordability for the mayor, public advocate, members of the city council, borough presidents, comptroller and district attorneys at the expense of New York City taxpayers.

== Personal life ==
Nantasha Williams is a homeowner, who lives in Cambria Heights, Queens, New York.

== Electoral history ==
=== 2025 ===
2025 New York City Council election, District 27
Party	Candidate	Votes	%
Democratic	Nantasha Williams (incumbent)	30,885	99.4
Write-in		180	0.6
Total votes		31,065	100.0
Democratic hold			

=== 2023 ===
2023 New York City Council election, District 27
Party	Candidate	Votes	%
Democratic	Nantasha Williams (incumbent)	8,881	92.5
Republican	Marilyn M. Miller	589	6.1
Medical Freedom	Marilyn M. Miller	74	0.8
Total	Marilyn M. Miller	663	6.9
Write-in		60	0.6
Total votes		9,604	100.0
Democratic hold			

=== 2021 ===
2021 New York City Council Democratic primary, District 27
Party	Candidate	Maximum round	Maximum votes	Share in maximum round	Maximum votes First round votes Transfer votes
Democratic	Nantasha Williams	13	11,810	72.9%	
Democratic	James J. Johnson	13	4,387	27.1%	
Democratic	Rene A. Hill	12	3,391	19.3%	
Democratic	Jason Myles Clark	11	2,257	12.4%	
Democratic	Al-Hassan Kanu	9	2,008	10.6%	
Democratic	Marie M. Adam-Ovide	8	1,851	9.5%	
Democratic	Kerryanne C. Burke	7	1,318	6.7%	
Democratic	Harold C. Miller Jr.	6	1,205	6.0%	
Democratic	Anthony Rivers	5	715	3.6%	
Democratic	Leroy Gadsden	4	451	2.2%	
Democratic	Jermaine Sean Smith	3	423	2.1%	
Democratic	Linda Guillebeaux	2	200	1.0%	
Write-In		1	42	0.2%	

2021 New York City Council election, District 27
Party	Candidate	Votes	%
Democratic	Nantasha Williams	21,195	99.6
Write-in		87	0.4
Total votes		21,282	100.0
Democratic hold			

=== 2016 ===
2016 New York State Assembly Democratic primary, District 33
Party	Candidate	Votes	%
Democratic	Clyde Vanel	1,822	32.3
Democratic	Nantasha Williams	1,590	28.2
Democratic	Bryan J. Block	1,402	24.9
Democratic	Roy Paul	599	10.6
Democratic	Sabine French	204	3.6
Write-in		22	0.4
Total votes		5,639	100.0

Political offices
Preceded by Diana Ayala	Deputy Speaker of the New York City Council; 2026–present	Incumbent
