= Guy Brewer =

American politician

Member of the New York State Assembly
- In office January 1, 1969 – October 31, 1978
- Preceded by: Kenneth N. Browne
- Succeeded by: Andrew Jenkins
- Constituency: 26th district (1969-1972); 29th district (1973-1978)

Personal details
- Born: Guy Rollingsheim Brewer; January 27, 1904 Georgia, US
- Died: October 31, 1978, aged 74 New York City, US
- Party: Democratic
- Other political affiliations: Progressive (1948)
- Spouse: Marie Brown
- Profession: Real Estate Broker

Guy Rollingsheim Brewer (January 27, 1904 – October 31, 1978, aged 74) was an American politician who served in the New York State Assembly between 1969 and 1978. He was one of the first African-Americans to be elected to political office in the New York City borough of Queens, and the first African-American to serve as Majority Whip in the Assembly. His district in southeastern Queens included the community of Jamaica, where a major thoroughfare, New York Boulevard was renamed Guy R. Brewer Boulevard after his death.

== Early life ==
Guy Brewer was born in Georgia. By the 1930s he was a real estate broker in the neighborhood of Washington Heights in Manhattan, where he was also a Democratic Party leader. He clashed with the Tammany Hall politicians who dominated Manhattan politics at the time when they diverted money from his district to a predominantly white one, making him a political pariah by his own account.

Brewer was a delegate to the 1948 Progressive National Convention.

In 1941, he joined a large number of African-Americans who were moving to Jamaica and vicinity at the time. As a real estate agent, he sought to help create a suburban African-American community in the area. He again got involved in Democratic politics, joining other activists who sought to increase African-American participation in local politics in an era when all of Queens' elected officials were white. In 1964 Kenneth Brown won a race to represent Jamaica in the State Assembly, becoming the first African-American elected government official in Queens. In 1968, Brewer was elected to succeed Brown, who had become a judge.

== Tenure in New York State Assembly ==
In the Assembly, Brewer championed several local issues. He opposed one proposal by the U.S. Department of Agriculture to build an quarantine facility for sick animals in St. Albans, Queens, and another to construct an industrial facility on the site of Springfield Park in Springfield Gardens. Neither of these were built. He was in favor of capital punishment, was pro-choice, and advocated a policy of open admissions at the City University of New York. He was a critic of government welfare policies that he viewed as accelerating urban decay in the area.

Late in his tenure, after he became afflicted with prostate cancer, Brewer advocated for the legalization of the controversial drug laetrile, which proponents claim to have anti-cancer properties but which mainstream medicine views as a toxic substance without health benefits. Due in part to his efforts, a bill that would make it legal to market the substance in New York passed the state legislature, but it was vetoed by Gov. Hugh Carey. Brewer and other supporters in the legislature were unable garner enough support to override the veto and the bill never became law. He died of cancer shortly thereafter on October 31, 1978.

== Personality and legacy ==
Brewer was known for his sarcastic wit, eloquence, and debating skill. He was married to Marie Brown Brewer (c. 1906 - 1984), who was also a Democratic district leader in Manhattan and was the first African-American woman to be an elected district leader in Queens, New York. The couple lived in the East Elmhurst section of Queens. In 1982, New York Boulevard, which runs from downtown Jamaica 3.7 miles south to the northern edge of JFK Airport, was renamed Guy R. Brewer Boulevard in his honor.
