= Leroy Comrie =

American politician (born 1958)

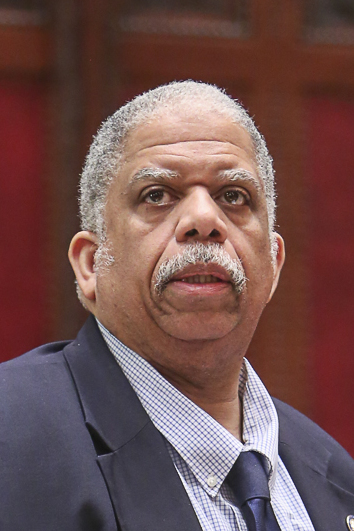

Member of the New York Senate from the 14th district
- Incumbent
- Assumed office January 1, 2015
- Preceded by: Malcolm Smith

Member of the New York City Council from the 27th district
- In office January 1, 2002 – December 31, 2013
- Preceded by: Archie Spigner
- Succeeded by: Daneek Miller

Personal details
- Born: Leroy George Comrie Jr. August 10, 1958 (age 68) New York City, New York, U.S.
- Party: Democratic
- Spouse: Marcia Moxam
- Children: 2
- Education: University of Bridgeport
- Website: State Senate website

Leroy George Comrie Jr. (born August 10, 1958) is an American politician from New York City. He represents district 14 in the New York State Senate, which comprises St. Albans, Cambria Heights, Jamaica, Hollis, Rosedale, Laurelton, Kew Gardens, Queens Village and other neighborhoods within the borough of Queens.

== Early life and education ==
Comrie Jr. is the son of the late Ruby Frith-Comrie and the late Leroy Comrie Sr., both of whom immigrated to the United States from Jamaica. He has one brother. He attended P.S. 116, I.S. 8, Jamaica High School and the University of Bridgeport, where he developed his passion for politics and government.

== Career ==
Early in his political career, he made much of his living as a photographer for local weddings and community events.

Prior to his election to the NYC Council, Comrie served seven years in the office of New York City Council Member Archie Spigner, moving from an aide to Chief of Staff during his tenure. He has also served as a member and eventually president of Community School Board 29.

=== New York City Council ===
Leroy Comrie was elected to represent the 27th district in the 2001 elections, succeeding Spigner. After a close election, Comrie won his election for the 27th district by less than 200 votes over his next opponent, local lawyer Helen Cooper-Gregory, in this six-way race. After his first re-election in 2005, Comrie was elected Deputy Majority Leader, also known as Majority Whip, by his Democratic colleagues on the council, as well as head of the Queens delegation, chair of the council's Consumer Affairs Committee, and later chair of the powerful Land Use Committee.

As Deputy Majority Leader, Comrie had access to some of the largest member items, also known as discretionary funding, in the legislative body. These funds went to local organizations throughout Southeast Queens, such as the Black Spectrum Theatre and his local Precinct Community Councils. Comrie also oversaw a sizable capital budget during his tenure allowing him to finance major construction projects in his district, such as the $19 million construction of P.S.36Q. As chair of the Queens Delegation, Comrie worked closely with Borough President Helen Marshall to increase investment into Queens Library allotting tens of millions of dollars annually to the library system through their terms. In 2007, then-Councilman Comrie helped pass a resolution in the NYC Council calling for an end to the use of the n-word in the New York. The resolution was largely symbolic but the unanimous vote by the council was the first clear statement on their position on the issue.

In 2009, Leroy Comrie won re-election to the New York City Council to serve his third-term. He defeated his Democratic opponent, local attorney and future-Assembly Member Clyde Vanel, 62%-38%. Comrie was a supporter of Mayor Michael Bloomberg's push to temporarily extend office terms to a third term, due to the economic recession, which allowed him run for office again.

As chair of the Consumer Protection Committee, in 2011, then-Councilman Leroy Comrie attempted to address the issue of child obesity by introducing legislation that would have forbidden toy giveaways in fast food restaurants with unhealthy meals. Although the bill was not passed, it is believed to have influenced McDonald's and later others in the Southeast Queens area and across the country to add healthy food items to their happy meals. This same year, Comrie held high-profile hearings about gang merchandising. The hearings focused on Buffalo-based New Era Cap Company who he accused of imitating gang styles to bolster profits. As chair of the Land-Use Committee, in 2013, Comrie helped lead the opposition to the proposed soccer stadium eyeing a home in Flushing Meadows-Corona Park. The proposal ultimately failed after an outpouring of opposition from the surrounding community.

=== Borough President election ===
In 2013, Comrie launched a campaign to succeed Helen Marshall as Borough President of Queens. His campaign promised to push for major investment in Queens infrastructure, particularly adding a new subway for Queens. Early on, Comrie struggled to keep up with his competitors in fundraising and failed to receive the endorsement of the powerful Queens County Democratic Party who chose to support Melinda Katz instead. Comrie would eventually drop out and endorse current Queens Borough President Melinda Katz in the Democratic primary. Comrie would later serve as Deputy Borough President under Katz during her first year in office.

=== New York State Senate ===
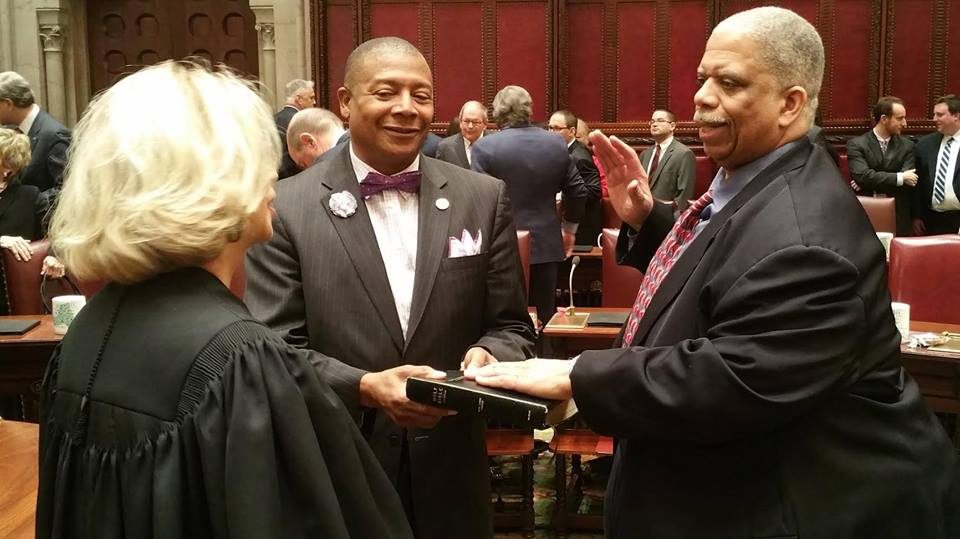
NYS Senator Leroy Comrie is sworn in for his second term with the assistance of NYS Senator James Sanders Jr. (D-Jamaica)

Accepting a sizable pay cut, in 2014, Comrie challenged Malcolm Smith for the New York Senate after his corruption charges and questionable loyalty to the Democratic Party began calls for his replacement. He defeated Smith in the Democratic Party primary election by a landslide. Following his election to the NYS Senate, Comrie helped lead the search to appoint his replacement as Deputy Borough President eventually selecting Melva Miller, the Queens Borough President's director of economic development and Southeast Queens resident, to the post.

Upon taking office, Comrie was appointed Ranking Member on the Elections Committee and Consumer Protection Committee.

=== 2016 Democratic National Convention ===
Comrie was also selected to be a delegate at the 2016 Democratic National Convention for the New York's 5th congressional district. Following the election of President Trump, Comrie joined Democrats across the State of New York to call for the Independent Democratic Conference of 8 State Senators to stop supporting the Republican Conference. He even began to vocally protest the institution by participating in town halls organized by their opponents. At one of these town halls, Comrie called his colleague, the Northeast Queens Senator Tony Avella, "the single most selfish person that I've ever met on a lot of different levels ... He has not reached out to me at all in any type of collegial fashion."

== Political positions ==
=== Housing ===
During his first legislative session in the New York State Senate, Leroy Comrie also passed a bill that expanded access to rent stabilization for the disabled.

As state senator, Comrie has helped lead the community on multiple initiatives such as preventing a state-run juvenile prison from being built on a closed elementary school in Queens Village, fighting the development of a multi-story religious dormitory on the controversial Chabad Lubavitch Jewish synagogue in Cambria Heights/Laurelton, and stopping the closure of the EmblemHealth facility in Cambria Heights which provides medical education and programming to the surrounding community. Comrie also took several high-profile stances against legislation considered by the NYC Council such as working with other Queens elected officials in opposing the congestion pricing proposal, and, in the NYS Senate, repealing the plastic bag fee passed by the NYC Council

=== Election laws ===
As Ranking Member on the Elections Committee, he has pushed for the Vote Better NY legislation package to address "the catastrophe known as New York's election law" by establishing early voting, simplifying ballots, and streamlining voter registration. The bills, among others, stalled in the New York State Senate due to opposition by the Republican leadership in control of the chamber at the time.

Comrie introduced legislation that would allow absentee ballot voting without an excuse. It would require amending the state constitution.

== Controversy ==
In 2007, Leroy Comrie was tangentially associated with a controversy regarding the dismissal of Council Member Charles Barron's chief of staff, Viola Plummer. Following a heated committee meeting on a bill co-naming a street in Brooklyn after Robert "Sonny" Carson, Plummer exited city hall and spoke to a small group in the plaza that included reporters. Plummer, a resident of Comrie's district, threatened to end Comrie's career and politically "assassinate" Comrie. These statements, taken in the light of the 2003 assassination of Council Member James Davis, led City Council Speaker Christine Quinn to arrange for an NYPD escort for Comrie and to dismiss Plummer. Plummer filed suit in federal court for violation of her First Amendment right to free speech but the claims were dismissed. During this trial Comrie testified that he felt "physically threatened" but took no personal actions to protect himself.

In 2011, Comrie made headlines when he chose not to renew the membership of the Chairperson of Queens Community Board 12. Adjoa Gzifa, chairperson of the board for three years, speculated that the decision came when she declared her opposition to numerous high-profile street renaming proposals supported by then-Councilman Comrie, including slain officer John Scarangella and Sean Bell. Since her removal, Ms. Gzifa has reconciled with Comrie and even partnered with him on numerous initiatives.

== Personal life ==
Comrie has been married to Marcia Moxam since 1990. They have two children. He is a lifelong member of Saint Albans the Martyr Episcopal Church, where he served as a layperson, vestryman and chalice administrator.
