= Archie Spigner =

American politician (1928–2020)

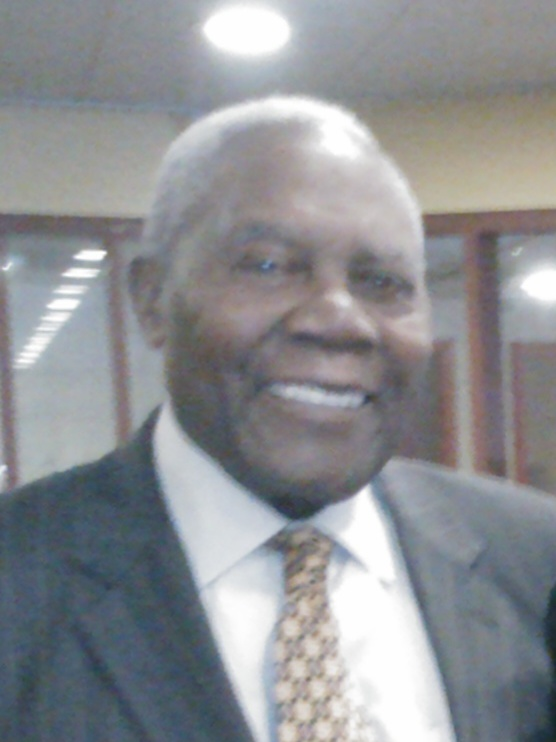
- Spigner in 2013

Member of the New York City Council from the 27th district
- In office January 1, 1992 – December 31, 2001
- Preceded by: Victor L. Robles
- Succeeded by: Leroy Comrie

Member of the New York City Council from the 17th district
- In office January 1, 1974 – December 31, 1991
- Preceded by: Walter Ward
- Succeeded by: Rafael Castaneira Colon

Personal details
- Born: August 27, 1928 Orangeburg, South Carolina, U.S.
- Died: October 29, 2020 (aged 92) Queens, New York, U.S.
- Party: Democratic
- Spouse: Leslie Spigner

Archie Spigner (August 27, 1928 – October 29, 2020) was an African-American politician who served in the New York City Council from 1974 to 2001. He was born in Orangeburg, South Carolina.

On the city council, he represented south-east Queens. He was also influential in races for other positions. He was called the "godfather of politics in southeastern Queens" by Gregory Meeks due to his ability to control who got elected from that area.

He died on October 29, 2020, in Queens, New York City, New York at age 92. The cause was cancer.
