= Alton Waldon =

American politician (1936–2023)

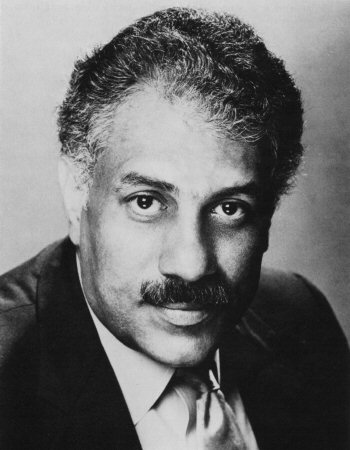

Judge of the New York Court of Claims
- In office January 10, 2000 – c. 2009
- Appointed by: George Pataki

Member of the U.S. House of Representatives from New York's 6th district
- In office June 10, 1986 – January 3, 1987 (Note: Waldon's official service begins on the date of the special election, while he was not sworn in until July 29, 1986.)
- Preceded by: Joseph P. Addabbo
- Succeeded by: Floyd Flake

Member of the New York Senate from the 10th district
- In office January 1, 1991 – January 1, 1999
- Preceded by: Andrew Jenkins
- Succeeded by: Malcolm Smith

Member of the New York State Assembly from the 33rd district
- In office January 1, 1983 – June 10, 1986
- Preceded by: John T. Flack
- Succeeded by: Barbara M. Clark

Personal details
- Born: Alton Ronald Waldon Jr. December 21, 1936 Lakeland, Florida, U.S.
- Died: June 9, 2023 (aged 86)
- Party: Democratic
- Education: John Jay College (BS); New York Law School (JD)

Military service
- Branch/service: United States Army
- Years of service: 1956–1959
- Rank: Specialist 4

Alton Ronald Waldon Jr. (December 21, 1936 – June 9, 2023) was an American politician and jurist from New York who served in the United States House of Representatives from 1986 to 1987 in addition to stints in the New York State Assembly from 1983 to 1986 and New York State Senate from 1991 to 2000, as a member of the Democratic Party.

== Early life and education ==
Born in Lakeland, Florida, Waldon graduated from Boys High School in Brooklyn, New York in 1954 and went on to earn a B.S. from John Jay College in New York City in 1968 and a J.D. from New York Law School in New York City in 1973.

== Career ==
=== Military service and city career ===
Waldon served in the United States Army from 1956 to 1959. He was appointed NYS Deputy Commissioner of Human Rights in 1975. He served as counsel in the Office of Mental Retardation and Developmental Disabilities.

=== New York State Assembly ===
Waldon was a member of the New York State Assembly from 1983 to 1986, sitting in the 185th and 186th New York State Legislatures. Waldon was a delegate to the 1984 and 1988 Democratic National Conventions.

=== U.S. House of Representatives ===
In a special election to fill the New York's 6th congressional district seat in the U.S. House of Representatives vacated by the late Joseph P. Addabbo, Waldon was elected as a Democrat to the 99th United States Congress in 1986 and served from June 10, 1986, to January 3, 1987. Waldon became the first elected African-American member of Congress from Queens, New York.

In September 1986, Waldon ran for a full term, but was defeated in the Democratic primary—the real contest in this heavily Democratic, majority-black district—by Floyd H. Flake. Waldon was then appointed to the New York State Commission of Investigation.

=== New York State Senate ===
Waldon was a member of the New York State Senate from 1991 to 1999, sitting in the 189th, 190th, 191st, 192nd and 193rd New York State Legislatures. In 1998, he tried to regain his congressional seat after Flake had resigned, running as the nominee of the Conservative Party of New York, but was defeated in the special election by state assemblyman Gregory Meeks.

=== Judicial career ===
In June 1999, he was nominated to the New York Court of Claims; and was confirmed by the State Senate in December.

== Death ==
Waldon died on June 9, 2023, at the age of 86.

== See also ==
- List of African-American United States representatives
- List of United States representatives who served a single term

== Sources ==
- United States Congress. "Alton Waldon (id: W000038)". Biographical Directory of the United States Congress.

New York State Assembly
Preceded by John T. Flack	New York State Assembly; 33rd District; 1983–1986	Succeeded by Barbara M. Clark
U.S. House of Representatives
Preceded by Joseph P. Addabbo	Member of the U.S. House of Representatives from New York's 6th congressional district 1986–1987	Succeeded by Floyd H. Flake
New York State Senate
Preceded by Andrew Jenkins	New York State Senate; 10th district 1991–1999	Succeeded by Malcolm Smith
