= Black, Rock and Ron =

- Origin: Hollis, Queens, New York, U.S.
- Genres: Hip hop
- Labels: Supreme; RCA

Black, Rock and Ron was an American hip hop trio from Hollis, Queens, composed of Lord Black (David Cootryer), The Ruler Master Rock (Greig Walsh), and Ron Scratch (Ron Walsh).

== Career ==
The trio’s album Stop the World was released on the Supreme record label in the UK and entered the UK Albums Chart on 22 April 1989, where it reached the No. 72 position. However, it only stayed on the charts for one week. Though its videos were featured on Yo! MTV Raps, the group failed to garner much national interest in the early days of new jack swing, and disbanded in 1991. Although relatively unknown, the group achieved renewed interest on eBay when a track of theirs appeared on rapper Edan's mixtape, Fast Rap. The group is name-checked in Nas' "A Queens Story".

== Discography ==
=== Albums ===
- Stop the World (1989), RCA

=== Singles and EPs ===
- "Hard Rap" (1986)
- "That's How I'm Living" (1987), Next Plateau Records
- "Black Rock and Ron" (1988), Popular Records
- "True Feelings" (1989), RCA
