= Daneek Miller =

American politician

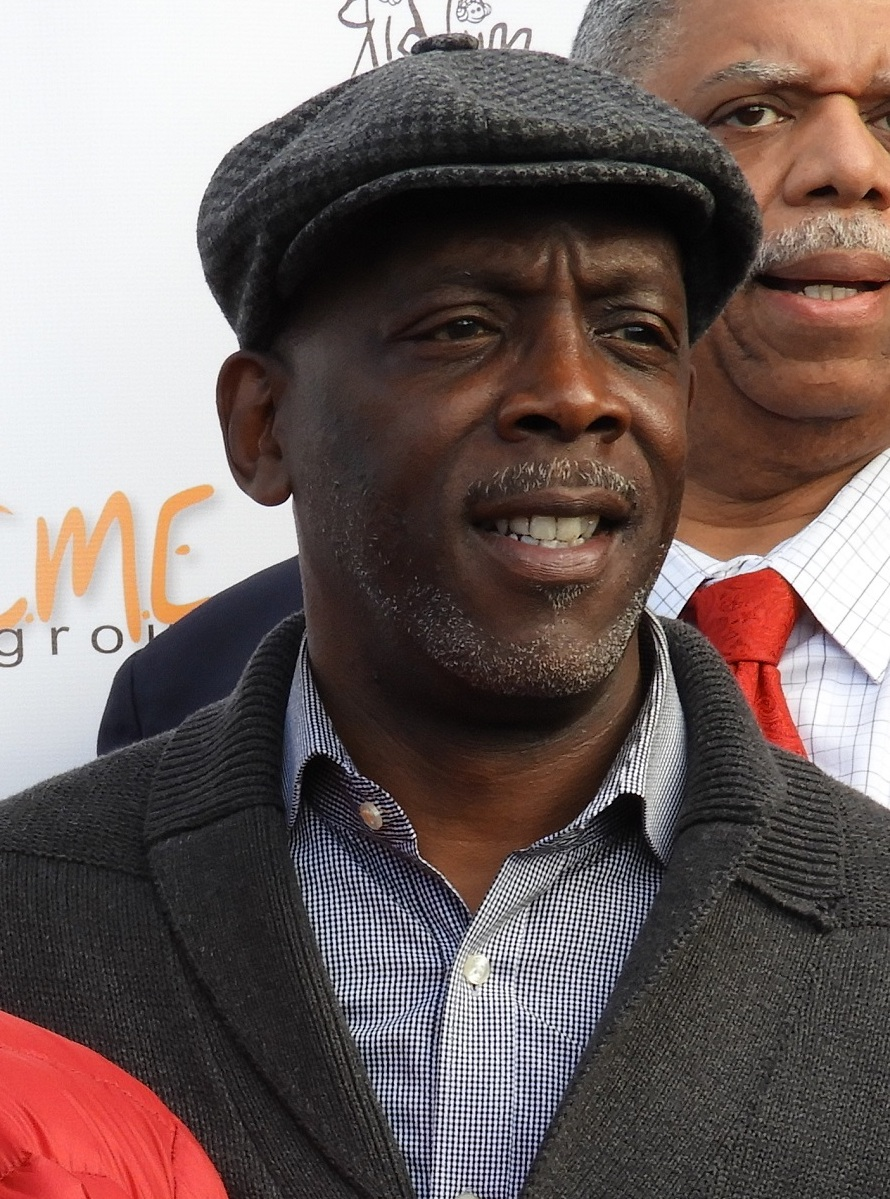
- Miller in 2016

Member of the New York City Council from the 27th district
- In office January 1, 2014 – December 31, 2021
- Preceded by: Leroy Comrie
- Succeeded by: Nantasha Williams

Personal details
- Born: November 6, 1960 (age 66) Brooklyn, New York, U.S.
- Party: Democratic
- Education: certificate from New York State School of Industrial and Labor Relations at Cornell University
- Website: Official website

Ira Daneek Miller (born November 6, 1960) is an American politician who served as the Council Member for the 27th district of the New York City Council in Queens. He is a Democrat. Miller was a Metropolitan Transportation Authority (MTA) bus driver for 19 years, and was a union leader.

== Early life ==
Miller was born in Brooklyn, New York, and is Muslim. He has a certificate from New York State School of Industrial and Labor Relations at Cornell University.

== Career ==
Miller was a Metropolitan Transportation Authority (MTA) bus driver for 19 years.

He was also a union leader, as he is a former co-chair of the MTA Labor Coalition, which represents 54,000 workers in 29 unions, and President of Amalgamated Transit Union (ATU) Local No. 1056, representing 2,000 drivers and mechanics who work for the MTA Queens Bus Division.

== New York City Council ==
=== 2013–17 ===
Miller was elected with 24% of the vote in the 2013 New York City Council elections for the 27th district of the New York City Council which included Cambria Heights, Hollis, Jamaica, Jamaica Estates, Laurelton, Queens Village, Springfield Gardens, and St. Albans in Queens, securing the Democratic nomination in a field of six candidates and then winning the general election with 97% of the vote. Miller was the only Muslim on the Council at this point.

He was appointed chair of the City Council Committee on Civil Service and Labor. Miller also became a member of the Black, Latino and Asian Caucus and the Progressive Caucus. In March 2014, Miller was named to the council's new Policy Working Group.

In May 2015, after Miller proposed a bill that would exempt MTA bus drivers from a key law in the New York City Vision Zero road traffic safety program, relatives of people who were killed in traffic crashes confronted him to express their disapproval. He sought to exempt MTA bus drivers from a "right of way" law that creates a misdemeanor for crashes that injure or kill pedestrians and bicyclists when the driver fails to "exercise due care."

In March 2016, Miller was arrested for disorderly conduct with Council Member Inez Barron and 39 others during a union protest as he and the others formed a human chain and blocked pedestrian traffic in front of Governor Cuomo's Midtown office building demanding a state budget that included what they said was "adequate funding for CUNY and a fair contract for its Professional Staff Congress". In September 2016, he was one of four council members who voted against a resolution condemning boycotts of Israel; the resolution passed 40–4, with six abstentions.

In March 2017, Mayor Bill de Blasio signed two measures introduced by Miller aimed at reining in so-called dollar vans that are either unlicensed or break city laws while operating legally. In partnership with Council Member Donovan Richards, Miller also helped bring $426 million in capital investments to expand access to the New York City sewer system over several years starting in 2014. Following the September 2017 Hurricane Maria, Miller joined NYC Council colleagues to Puerto Rico to survey the damage caused by the hurricane.

=== 2017–19 ===
In September 2017, Miller was re-elected to the New York City Council over his Democratic Primary challenger Anthony Rivers and Sondra Peeden. After his re-election, he continued to serve as Chairman of the Committee on Civil Service and Labor. Miller was appointed to other new committees under the new Speakership of Council Member Corey Johnson and elected co-chair of the Black, Latino and Asian Caucus. Miller was an opponent of the Governor's proposed congestion pricing in New York City, writing an October 2017 op-ed condemning the idea.

In December 2017, after years of intensive lobbying by the local waste industry, efforts to pass Intro 495-C, a transfer station capacity reduction bill, were unsuccessful in the New York City Council. Miller was one of three original three sponsors of the bill, but his support suddenly evaporated. Labor and environmental organizations released a joint press release condemning Miller, and making veiled accusations of industry influence on him. Campaign finance records reflected that Miller received six successive contributions on September 19, 2017, from employees or family members involved with area company Royal Waste Services. In addition, from August 2017 through 2019, Royal Waste employed Miller's son.

In September 2018, Miller and Corey Johnson, announcing what Miller noted was a "commitment to stand squarely with our Muslim brothers and sisters," announced at the Islamic Circle of North America mosque their collaboration to allocate $250,000 in 2019 for a "Muslim Empowerment Initiative" to benefit 14 organizations, including the mosque, that served the city's Muslim population.

=== 2020–21 ===
In July 2020, Miller said he supported cutting a billion dollars from the police budget.

In 2021, after the New York City Council passed a Waste Equity Law in 2018—over industry opposition—sharply reducing trash trucked to waste transfer stations in environmentally hard-hit neighborhoods, and Southeast Queens waste station Royal Waste Services paid a lobbyist to target and lobby Miller, he sought to roll back the change in his own district. Miller was the sole sponsor of a bill that would lift the restrictions for transfer stations that intended to ship out trash by rail ... at some point over the following four years. Among the trash station operators in the area were Royal Waste Services, its affiliate Regal Recycling Company, and American Recycling Co. Miller's effort to roll back the law led constituents of his who had advocated for the Waste Equity Law to protest outside Miller's office, saying that it led to environmental racism, with garbage trucks constantly rumbling down the streets and exhaust leaving them gasping for air. The protesters presented a petition signed by community residents that said the bill only: "benefits the elected official that gets funding from these organizations at the expense of the district they represent." The bill's trajectory was atypical, given that the committee chair Antonio Reynoso was out of the country, and that the bill had only one sponsor, Miller. Reynoso's chief of staff, Jennifer Gutiérrez, described Miller's bill as "wildly irresponsible and disappointing," saying further "this bill that could potentially negate the progress we made."

In 2021 Miller said that foreclosure prevention funding and the development of new affordable housing in Jamaica, Queens, the creation of Atlantic Ticket and its discounted Long Island Railroad fares, and public funding for Roy Wilkins Park were among the highlights of his work in office.

In 2021, term limits kept him from running for another term.

=== Election history ===
Election history
Location	Year	Election	Results
NYC Council District 27	2013	Democratic Primary	√ Daneek Miller 24.35% Clyde Vanel 21.53% Joan Flowers 21.18% Manuel Caughman 17.72% Gregory Mays 11.28% Sondra H. Peeden 3.94%
NYC Council District 27	2013	General	√ Daneek Miller (D) 96.71% Sondra H. Peeden (I) 3.15%
NYC Council District 27	2017	Democratic Primary	√ Daneek Miller 77.95% Anthony Rivers 21.43% Write-Ins 0.06%
NYC Council District 27	2017	General	√ Daneek Miller (D) 94.85% Rupert Green (R) 3.23% Frank Francois (G) 1.80% Write-Ins 0.13%

== Personal life ==
Miller has a son, Coron Miller. In April 2015, Coron Miller, who at the time had a record of 14 arrests (including for assault, and some sealed), was arrested in Queens and charged with assault, criminal mischief, resisting arrest, harassment, and menacing, and had an order of protection lodged against him in Queens Criminal Court, after an alleged road rage incident. Daneek Miller said: "Some of the facts are disputable. My advice would be to take the higher road and work things out."

Political offices
Preceded by Leroy Comrie	New York City Council, 27th district 2014–21	Succeeded by Nantasha Williams
