= Malcolm Smith (American politician) =

American politician (born 1956)

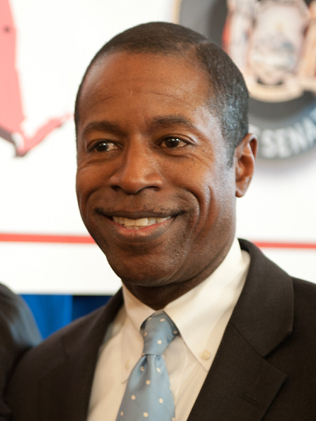
- Smith in 2013

President pro tempore of the New York State Senate
- In office July 9, 2009 – December 31, 2010
- Preceded by: Pedro Espada Jr.
- Succeeded by: Dean Skelos

Acting Lieutenant Governor of New York
- In office January 7, 2009 – June 8, 2009
- Governor: David Paterson
- Preceded by: Dean Skelos (acting)
- Succeeded by: Pedro Espada Jr. (acting)

Majority Leader of the New York State Senate
- In office January 7, 2009 – June 8, 2009
- Preceded by: Dean Skelos
- Succeeded by: Dean Skelos

Member of the New York State Senate
- In office January 1, 2000 – December 31, 2014
- Preceded by: Alton R. Waldon Jr.
- Succeeded by: Leroy Comrie
- Constituency: 10th district (2000-2002); 14th district (2003-2014)

Personal details
- Born: Malcolm Anthony Smith; August 9, 1956 (age 70) New York City, New York, U.S.
- Party: Democratic
- Other political affiliations: Independent Democratic Conference (2011–2013)
- Spouse: Michele Lisby
- Children: 4
- Education: Fordham University (BA); Adelphi University (MBA)
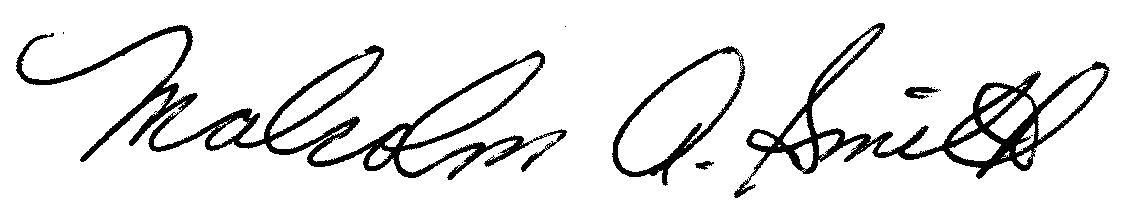
- Signature

Malcolm Anthony Smith (born August 9, 1956) is an American politician from New York who was convicted of public corruption. A Democrat, Smith represented the 10th district in the New York State Senate from 2000 to 2002 and Senate District 14 from 2003 to 2014. Smith served as New York State Senate Majority Leader in 2009 and as Temporary President of the New York State Senate from 2009 to 2010; he is the first African-American to hold those leadership positions.

On April 2, 2013, Smith was arrested by the FBI on federal corruption charges. The United States Attorney for the Southern District of New York and the Federal Bureau of Investigation alleged that Smith attempted to secure a spot on the Republican ballot in the 2013 New York City mayoral election through bribery of New York City Councilman Dan Halloran and two other Republican officials. In September 2014, Smith's Democratic primary challenger, former New York City Councilman Leroy Comrie, defeated Smith in a landslide. The following year, Smith was convicted of all charges against him and sentenced to seven years in federal prison.

== Political career ==
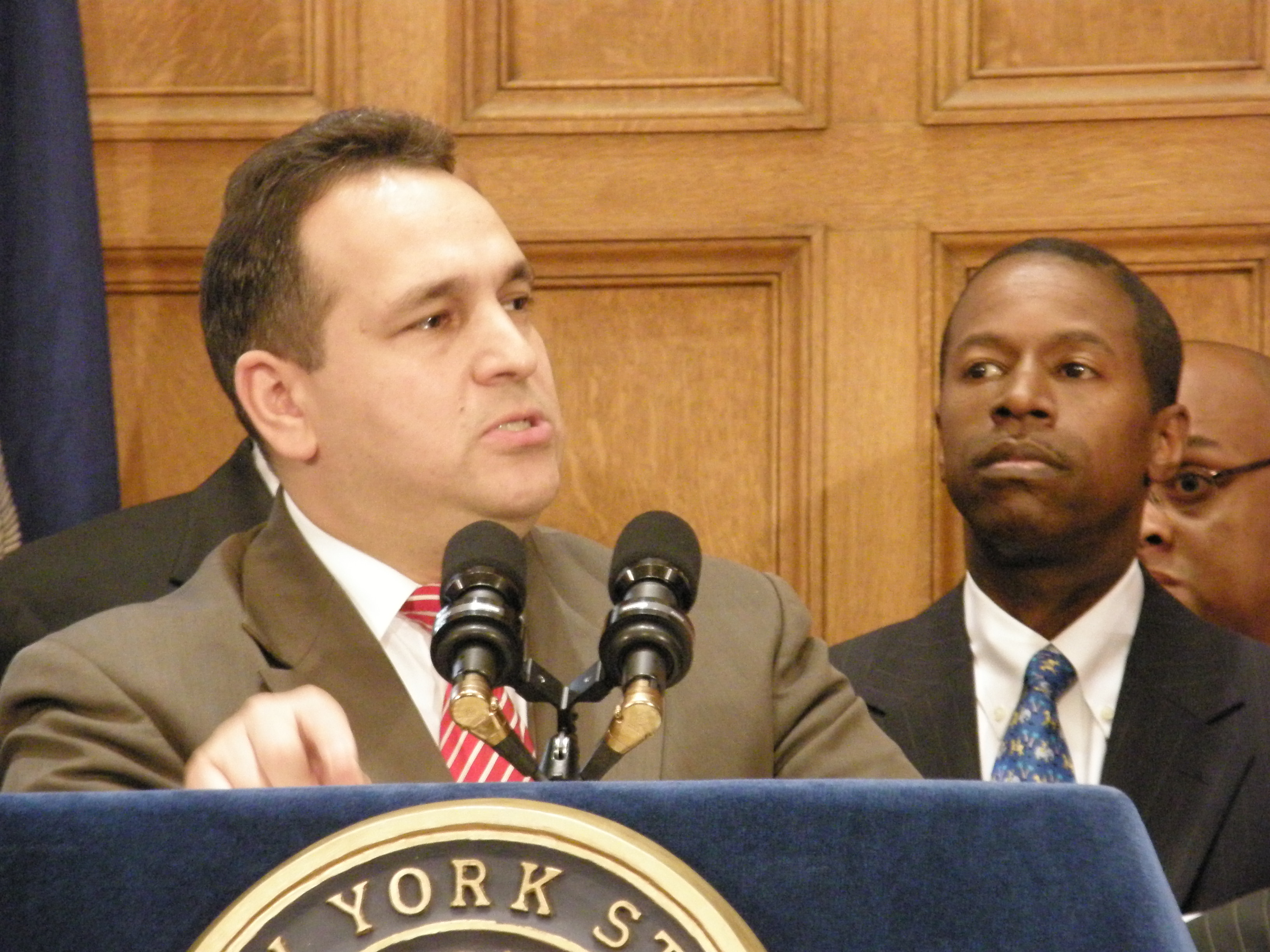
Smith (right) with Hiram Monserrate in 2009.

Smith began his political career as a senior aide and political protégé to Congressman Floyd H. Flake from 1986 to 1991. Smith also served as a chief aide to City Councilman Archie Spigner, who was an assistant to Mayor Ed Koch.

=== New York State Senate ===
Smith was first elected to the New York State Senate in a 2000 special election. He was elected minority leader in January 2007, succeeding David Paterson. After the 2008 state elections, Democrats gained a majority of seats in the State Senate for the first time in 40 years, and Smith was subsequently chosen as Majority Leader and Temporary President of the body in January 2009. He was the first African American to hold this position. However, on June 8 of that year, Sens. Pedro Espada Jr. and Hiram Monserrate joined with the thirty Republicans in voting to replace Smith as Senate Majority Leader, triggering the 2009 New York State Senate leadership crisis. The crisis concluded the following month when Espada and Monserrate abandoned their alliance with the Republicans and rejoined the Senate Democratic Conference. As a compromise, Smith retained only the title of Temporary President of the Senate, with the title of Majority Leader going to Espada.

Smith's legislative achievements included a three-bill package to combat child sexual abuse. He also helped launch a series of forums statewide for prevention of foreclosure.

Smith also secured funding for a program to curb gun violence. In the wake of the Sean Bell shooting incident, Smith created and chaired the Tri-Level Legislative Task Force, which released a report on increasing public confidence in law enforcement and the criminal justice system. Some of its recommendations were passed by the state legislature.

In 2010, a federal grand jury investigated Smith's involvement in various nonprofit groups. Also in 2010, Smith stated that if the Democrats retained control of the State Senate in the 2010 elections, he would direct his caucus to use gerrymandering and "draw the lines so that Republicans will be in oblivion for the next twenty years."

Smith was re-elected to his State Senate seat without opposition in 2012. Following his reelection, he joined forces with the Independent Democratic Conference to form a "bipartisan governing coalition" with Senate Republicans.

Following Smith's April 2013 arrest on corruption charges, he was expelled from the Independent Democratic Conference. In September 2014, Smith's Democratic primary challenger, former New York City Councilman Leroy Comrie, defeated him in a landslide.

=== 2013 New York City mayoral election ===
Smith expressed interest in running for mayor of New York City as a Republican in the 2013 mayoral election. He would have needed a Wilson Pakula certification in order to do so. His attempts to obtain that certification led to his April 2, 2013 arrest by the FBI for allegedly attempting to bribe Republican leaders whose permission he needed to run for mayor on the Republican ticket despite being a registered Democrat.

== Criminal trial and conviction ==
On April 2, 2013, Smith was arrested by the FBI on federal corruption charges.

Smith's trial, along with the trial of co-defendants Dan Halloran, Joseph J. Savino, Vincent Tabone, and Joseph Desmaret, began in the Federal Court in White Plains, New York, on June 1, 2014. Shortly after the trial started, it became known that some conversations that had been secretly recorded and could be used as evidence were in Yiddish, and that prosecutors had not given those recordings to the defense. The Yiddish amounted to more than 28 hours on the recordings, which would have taken weeks to translate, transcribe, and analyze. This would have pushed what would have been a two-week trial well into July. After four of the jurors contended a longer trial would interfere with work and child care, Smith and some of the defendants were granted a mistrial on June 17, 2014.

At Smith's second trial, he was convicted on February 5, 2015, of all the corruption charges he faced. Those charges included conspiracy, wire fraud, travel act bribery, and extortion. The jury deliberated only briefly before returning with the guilty verdict. On July 1, 2015, Judge Kenneth M. Karas sentenced Smith to seven years in prison.

As of July 2019, Smith was incarcerated at the federal penitentiary in Lewisburg, Pennsylvania. The Bureau of Prisons' Inmate Locator lists Smith's status as "Released" as of October 22, 2021.

== Personal life ==
Smith is a member of the African Methodist Episcopal Church. He is married to Michele Lisby-Smith. They have three children, Tracey, Julian and Amanda. In 2006, a former aide of Smith's filed a paternity suit against him, and he eventually acknowledged paternity of the aide's child and began paying child support.

== See also ==
- List of minority governors and lieutenant governors in the United States

New York State Senate
Preceded by Alton R. Waldon Jr.	New York State Senate; 10th district 2000–2002	Succeeded by Ada L. Smith
Preceded by George Onorato	New York State Senate; 14th district 2003–2014	Succeeded by Leroy Comrie
Political offices
Preceded by David Paterson	Minority Leader in the New York State Senate; 2007–2008	Succeeded by Dean Skelos
Preceded by Dean Skelos	Majority Leader of the New York State Senate; 2009	Succeeded by 2009 New York State Senate leadership crisis (both Smith and Skelos claimed to be majority leader)
Preceded by Dean Skelos; Acting	Lieutenant Governor of New York; Acting; 2009	Succeeded by Pedro Espada Jr. Acting
Preceded by Pedro Espada Jr.	Temporary President of the New York State Senate; 2009–2010	Succeeded by Dean Skelos
