= New York City's 27th City Council district =

- Boundaries following the 2020 census

Government
  - Councilmember: Nantasha Williams (D—St. Albans)

Population (2010)
  - Total: 155,898

Demographics
  - Black: 73%
  - Hispanic: 13%
  - Asian: 7%
  - White: 2%
  - Other: 5%

Registration
  - Democratic: 79.5%
  - Republican: 3.3%
  - No party preference: 14.7%
- Registered voters (2021) 112,185

New York City's 27th City Council district is one of 51 districts in the New York City Council. It is currently represented by Democrat Nantasha Williams.

== Geography ==
District 27 is based in the predominantly Black neighborhoods of southeastern Queens, including St. Albans, Cambria Heights, and parts of Jamaica, Hollis, Springfield Gardens, and Queens Village.

The district overlaps with Queens Community Boards 12 and 13, and is contained entirely within New York's 5th congressional district. It also overlaps with the 10th, 11th, and 14th districts of the New York State Senate, and with the 24th, 29th, 32nd, and 33rd districts of the New York State Assembly.

== Recent election results ==
=== 2025 ===
2025 New York City Council election, District 27
Party	Candidate	Votes	%
Democratic	Nantasha Williams (incumbent)	30,885	99.4
Write-in		180	0.6
Total votes		31,065	100.0
Democratic hold			

=== 2023 (redistricting) ===
Due to redistricting and the 2020 changes to the New York City Charter, councilmembers elected during the 2021 and 2023 City Council elections will serve two-year terms, with full four-year terms resuming after the 2025 New York City Council elections.

2023 New York City Council election, District 27
Party	Candidate	Votes	%
Democratic	Nantasha Williams (incumbent)	8,881	92.5
Republican	Marilyn Miller	589	
Medical Freedom	Marilyn Miller	74	
Total	Marilyn Miller	663	6.9
Write-in		60	0.6
Total votes		9,604	100.0
Democratic hold			

=== 2021 ===
In 2019, voters in New York City approved Ballot Question 1, which implemented ranked-choice voting in all local elections. Under the new system, voters have the option to rank up to five candidates for every local office. Voters whose first-choice candidates fare poorly will have their votes redistributed to other candidates in their ranking until one candidate surpasses the 50 percent threshold. If one candidate surpasses 50 percent in first-choice votes, then ranked-choice tabulations will not occur.

2021 New York City Council election, District 27 Democratic primary
Party	Candidate	Maximum round	Maximum votes	Share in maximum round	Maximum votes First round votes Transfer votes
Democratic	Nantasha Williams	13	11,810	72.9%	
Democratic	James Johnson	13	4,387	27.1%	
Democratic	Rene Hill	12	3,391	19.3%	
Democratic	Jason Myles Clark	11	2,257	12.4%	
Democratic	Al-Hassan Kanu	9	2,008	10.6%	
Democratic	Marie Adam-Ovide	8	1,851	9.5%	
Democratic	Kerryanne Burke	7	1,318	6.7%	
Democratic	Harold Miller	6	1,205	6.0%	
Democratic	Anthony Rivers	5	715	3.6%	
Democratic	Leroy Gadsden	4	451	2.2%	
Democratic	Jermaine Sean Smith	3	423	2.1%	
Democratic	Linda Guillebeaux	2	200	1.0%	
Write-in		1	42	0.2%	

An interactive map of District 27

2021 New York City Council election, District 27 general election
Party	Candidate	Votes	%
Democratic	Nantasha Williams	21,195	99.6
Write-in		86	0.4
Total votes		21,281	100
Democratic hold			

=== 2017 ===
2017 New York City Council election, District 27
Primary election
Party	Candidate	Votes	%
Democratic	Daneek Miller (incumbent)	8,119	77.9
Democratic	Anthony Rivers	2,237	21.5
Write-in		66	0.6
Total votes		10,422	100
General election
Democratic	Daneek Miller (incumbent)	23,488	94.8
Republican	Rupert Green	799	3.2
Green	Frank Francois	446	1.8
Write-in		31	0.1
Total votes		24,764	100
Democratic hold			

=== 2013 ===
2013 New York City Council election, District 27
Primary election
Party	Candidate	Votes	%
Democratic	Daneek Miller	3,982	24.4
Democratic	Clyde Vanel	3,521	21.5
Democratic	Joan Flowers	3,463	21.2
Democratic	Manuel Caughman	2,898	17.7
Democratic	Greg Mays	1,845	11.3
Democratic	Sondra Peeden	644	3.9
Write-in		0	0.0
Total votes		16,353	100
General election
Democratic	Daneek Miller	20,248	
Working Families	Daneek Miller	662	
Total	Daneek Miller	20,910	96.7
Independence	Sondra Peeden	680	3.1
Write-in		31	0.2
Total votes		21,621	100
Democratic hold			
