= William Scarborough (politician) =

American politician

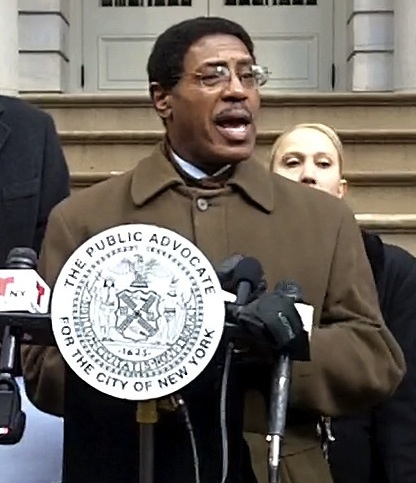
- Scarborough in 2013

Member of the New York State Assembly from the 29th district
- In office January 1, 1995 – May 7, 2015
- Preceded by: Cynthia Jenkins
- Succeeded by: Alicia Hyndman

Personal details
- Born: March 14, 1946 (age 80) Queens, New York, U.S.
- Party: Democratic
- Spouse: Andrea
- Children: four
- Education: Queens College
- Profession: politician
- Website: Official website

William Scarborough (born March 14, 1945) is a Democrat who represented District 29 in the New York State Assembly, which includes large portions of Queens County, including Jamaica. He chaired the Assembly Committee on Children and Families and served as a member of several other standing committees.

Scarborough grew up in Jamaica, Queens, and has also lived in St. Albans and Rosedale, graduated Public School 140 June, 1957, Shimer J.H.S. 142, and Andrew Jackson High School. He received an associate's degree from Queensborough Community College in 1970 and B.A. degree in psychology and political science from Queens College (City University of New York) in 1975.

He was an account executive with the New York Telephone Company from 1979 to 1983. His initial start in politics included a stint as a member of Community Board 28 (1977–1983). Prior to his election to the Assembly, Scarborough served as District Manager of Community Board 12 (1984–1994), as well as in the capacity of Chairman of Area Policy Board 12 (1983–1994).

Scarborough was first elected to the State Assembly in 1994. He ran uncontested in the 2008, 2010, 2012, and 2014 general elections. During his tenure in the State Assembly, Scarborough was the Chair of the Small Business Committee and a vocal advocate for the City and State to address the flooding occurring in his district. Flooding in Southeast Queens is primarily the result of the restored water table that developed following the closure of the Greater Jamaica Water Companies pumping operations.

On October 1, 2014, Scarborough was indicted on eleven federal charges and 23 state charges of using campaign funds for personal benefit. On May 7, 2015, he pleaded guilty and resigned his Assembly seat. In September, 2015, Scarborough was sentenced to 13 months in federal prison for his crime. Since his release from prison, he has found employment with the Fortune Society, which helps recently released former inmates connect with social services, and is president of two local community groups.

New York State Assembly
Preceded by Cynthia Jenkins	New York State Assembly; 29th District; 1995–2015	Succeeded by Alicia Hyndman
