= Barbara M. Clark =

American politician (1939–2016)

Member of the New York State Assembly from the 33rd district
- In office January 3, 1987 – February 22, 2016
- Preceded by: Alton R. Waldon, Jr.
- Succeeded by: Clyde Vanel

Personal details
- Born: June 12, 1939 Beckley, West Virginia
- Died: February 22, 2016 (aged 76) New Hyde Park, New York
- Party: Democratic
- Spouse: Thomas
- Children: 4
- Profession: politician
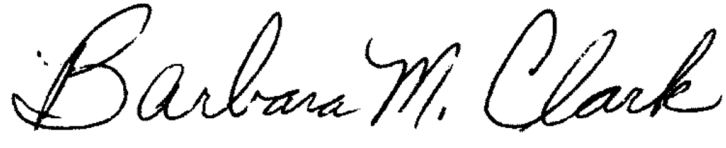
- Signature
- Website: Official website

Barbara M. Clark (June 12, 1939 – February 22, 2016) represented New York State Assembly District 33, which comprises Bellerose, Cambria Heights, Hollis and St. Albans, among other neighborhoods located in Queens County, New York.

== Biography ==
Clark was born in 1939 in Beckley, West Virginia. First elected in 1986, Clark ran uncontested in the 2008 and 2010 general elections. In the 2015-2015 Legislative session she served as the Assistant Majority Whip and served on several standing committees, including Children and Families, Education and Environmental Conservation, among others. Throughout her career she also chaired a number of committees, including standing committees on Aging, State and Federal Relations and the New York State Legislative Women's Caucus, a committee of female legislators from both parties and from both chambers of the New York State Legislature. At the time of her death, she served as the Chair of the Education Committee of the Black, Puerto Rican and Hispanic Caucus and is a member of the Steering Committee.

She has also served as vice-chair of the National Conference of State Legislators' Education, Labor and Job Training Committee, and was a member of the NCSL's Human Services Committee. She had been a member of the Education Commission of States since 1989 and served a four-year term on that organization's Steering Committee. In 2011, Clark voted against the Marriage Equality Act.

Clark was born and raised in Beckley, West Virginia. She and her husband, Thomas, had four adult children and two granddaughters. Clark was a resident of Cambria Heights, Queens. Clark died at her home in New Hyde Park, New York on February 22, 2016.

New York State Assembly
Preceded by Alton R. Waldon Jr.	New York State Assembly; 33rd District; 1987–2016	Succeeded by Clyde Vanel
