= Clyde Vanel =

American politician (born 1974)

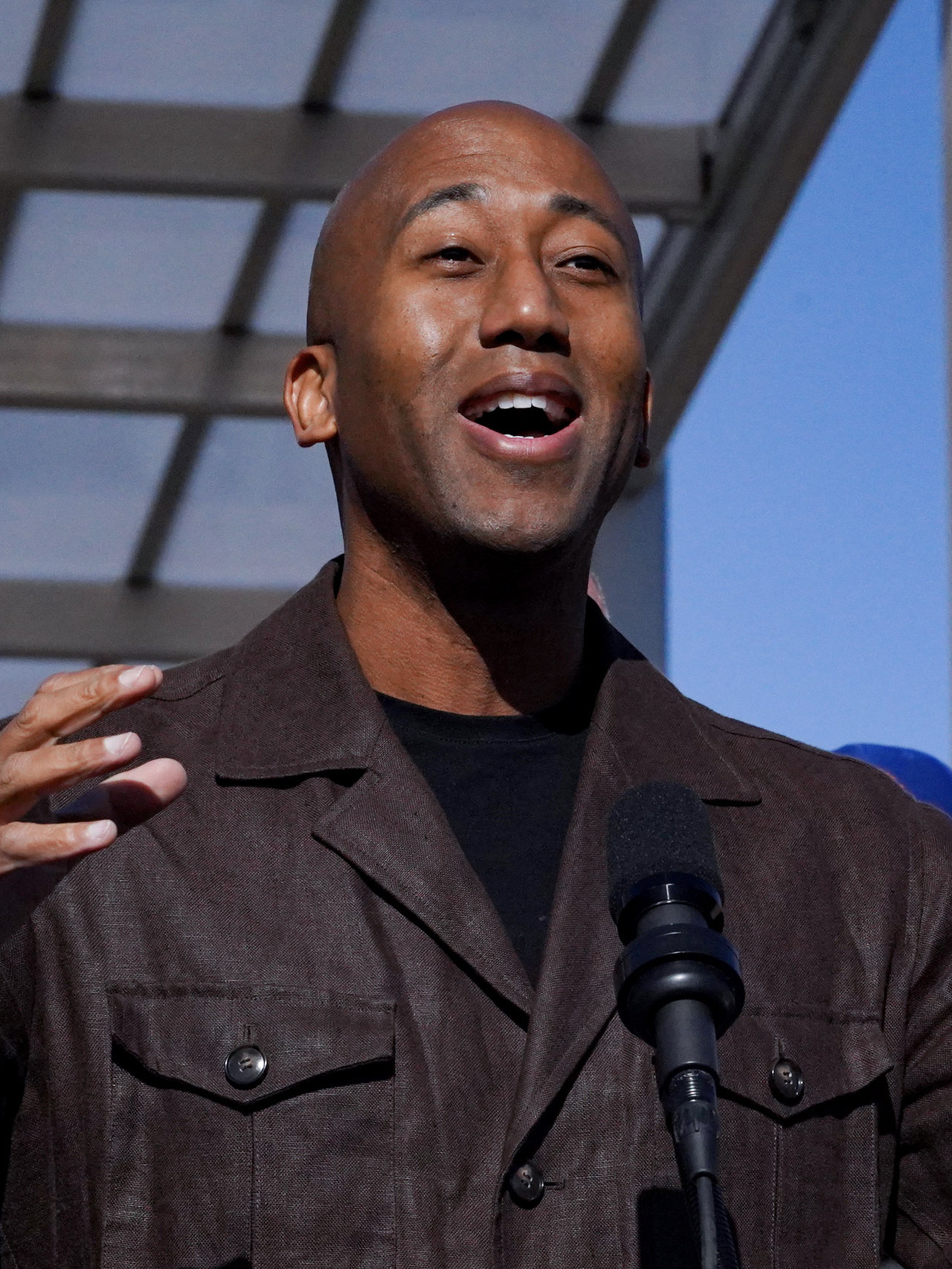
- Vanel speaking in 2021

Member of the New York State Assembly from the 33rd district
- Incumbent
- Assumed office December 8th, 2016
- Preceded by: Barbara M. Clark

Personal details
- Born: June 19, 1974 (age 52) New York City, New York, U.S.
- Party: Democratic
- Education: Embry-Riddle Aeronautical University; Farmingdale State College (BS); Boston University (JD)
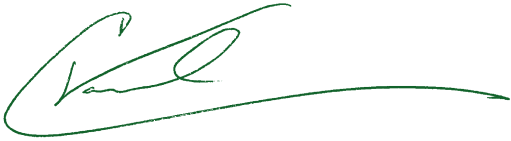
- Signature
- Website: State Assembly website

Clyde Vanel (born June 19, 1974) is an intellectual property attorney and entrepreneur serving as the assembly member for the 33rd district of the New York State Assembly. A Democrat, he is the chair of the Committee on Banks and Chair of the Subcommittee Internet and New Technology. The district includes Cambria Heights, St. Albans, Hollis, Queens Village, Bellerose and parts of Floral Park in Queens.

== Life and career ==
Vanel was born in Queens and raised in the Cambria Heights neighborhood along with nine siblings. He attended Embry-Riddle Aeronautical University where he became a member of Kappa Alpha Psi. He went on to earn an Associates in Aerospace Technology and a bachelor's degree in Aviation Administration from Farmingdale State College. He served as the student government President at Farmingdale State College. He later earned his J.D. from Boston University where he served as the editor-in-chief of the Journal of Science & Technology Law.

Vanel subsequently worked as an intellectual property attorney for the-then largest intellectual property law firm in the country, Fish & Neave, which was acquired by Ropes & Gray, LLP. He currently practices business law, intellectual property and trademark law at the Vanel Law Firm.

Vanel is also an entrepreneur and small business owner. Vanel was the owner of Vanel's on First, a restaurant and bar in Lower Manhattan, from 2005 to 2011. Vanel is an inventor business owner. He founded a company that manufactures and sells Clean Bee shirt collar protectors online and on Amazon. He is also a technology and internet entrepreneur; he owns and operates the trademark service website TrademarkReady.com.

On March 17, 2023, Clyde Vanel survived a plane crash on in Long Island. He was flying his single-engine airplane, Beechcraft Bonanza, when the engine quit. He made an emergency landing on Shoreham beach without any injuries.

He is an aircraft owner, commercial-rated pilot and the founder of the New York Metro chapter of the Black Pilots of America.

== New York State Assembly ==
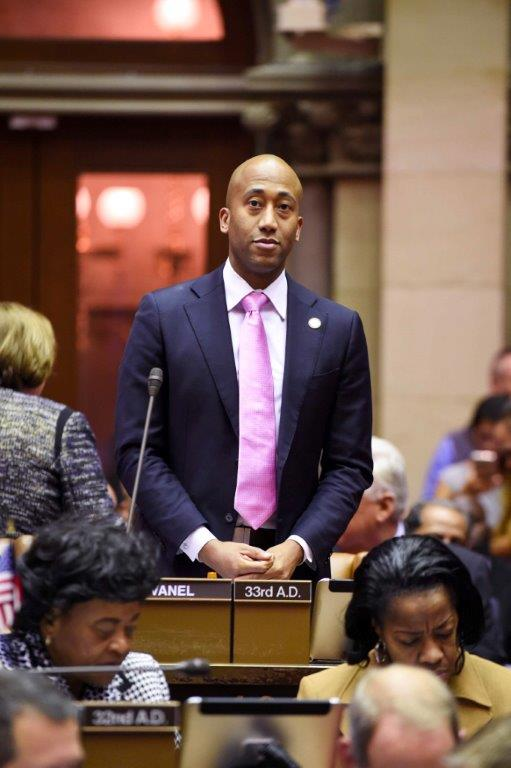
Clyde Vanel on the state assembly floor in Albany.

Vanel's first run for public office was in 2009, when he ran for the New York City Council against incumbent Councilmember Leroy Comrie in the Democratic primary. He lost to Comrie, 62% to 38%.

He then ran for New York State Assembly twice. He first ran in 2010 against Barbara M. Clark, again in the Democratic primary. He again lost, 63% to 37%. He lost to Clark again in 2012, 64% to 36%. In 2013, he again ran for the city council, this time in an open seat to succeed Comrie. He lost the Democratic primary to Daneek Miller, coming in a close second in a six-way race.

In 2016, the incumbent Clark died. Vanel entered the race to succeed her and won a five-way Democratic primary with 32% of the vote, and would easily go on to win the general election.

Vanel is the chair of the Committee on Banks and chair of the Subcommittee on Internet & New Technology. He introduced and sponsored a number of bills and laws relating to blockchain technology, cryptocurrency, Internet sales tax, online data, artificial intelligence, space exploration, sports betting, online poker and aviation.

In December 2021, Vanel entered the race for New York State Attorney General. He withdrew from the race when Attorney General Letitia James withdrew from her run for governor to run for re-election.

Vanel serves on the following committees: Banks; Codes, Rules, Science and Technology, Corporations and Authorities; and Racing and Wagering.
