= Joseph P. Addabbo =

American politician (1925–1986)

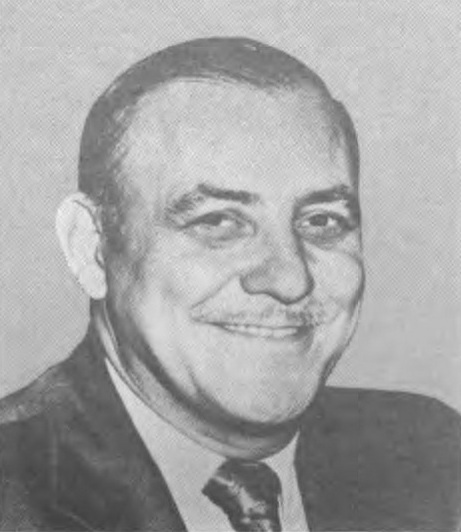

Member of the U.S. House of Representatives from New York
- In office January 3, 1961 – April 10, 1986
- Preceded by: Albert H. Bosch
- Succeeded by: Alton Waldon
- Constituency: 5th district (1961–63); 7th district (1963–83); 6th district (1983–86)

Personal details
- Born: Joseph Patrick Addabbo; March 17, 1925 Queens, New York, U.S.
- Died: April 10, 1986 (aged 61) Washington, D.C., U.S.
- Resting place: Saint John's Cemetery, Queens
- Party: Democratic
- Children: Three, including Joseph Addabbo Jr.
- Education: City College of New York; St. John's Law School

Joseph Patrick Addabbo (March 17, 1925 – April 10, 1986) was a New York City politician who served as a Democrat in the United States House of Representatives from 1961 until his death in 1986. As the chairman of the United States House Appropriations Subcommittee on Defense in the 1980s, he was a noted critic of President Ronald Reagan's defense spending increases.

== Early life, education, and early career ==
Addabbo was born in Queens, New York, and lived in the borough his entire life. He was a 1946 graduate of St. John's Law School and practiced law in Ozone Park, New York before his election to Congress in 1960.

== Political career ==
Addabbo was first elected to the U.S. House of Representatives in 1960. He was the Democratic nominee to replace Queens Rep. Albert H. Bosch, a Republican who left Congress to begin a judicial career.

Addabbo became chairman of the defense spending subcommittee in 1979. In the post, he frequently sparred with President Reagan and was a favorite media source for accounts of the epic military spending battles in the early 1980s. Addabbo created a yearly routine of calling for deep cuts to the administration's budget. In 1983, he proposed slashing Reagan's defense spending plan by $30 billion. Though Addabbo's efforts were usually unsuccessful, he managed to eliminate funding for MX and Pershing II missiles in 1982.

=== Final campaigns ===
Although he usually sailed to reelection in his overwhelmingly Democratic and Italian-American Southwestern Queens district, a reapportionment following the 1980 census spelled trouble for Addabbo in his final two campaigns. His district absorbed a considerably larger number of African Americans in Jamaica, Queens than had previously been in the district. His old district was 35 percent black, while his new district was 65 percent black. Some of his Italian-American base were moved into the district of fellow Democrat Charles Schumer while others were moved into the district of fellow Italian-American Democrat Geraldine Ferraro, who had won a closer-than-expected election two years earlier. This left him open to a surprisingly strong primary challenge from black real estate developer Simeon Golar in 1982. Two years later, Golar ran again with the active backing of then-presidential candidate Jesse Jackson, but Addabbo won again.

== Personal life and death ==
Addabbo's health started to fail shortly after his 1984 re-election. In 1985, he spent four months in the Walter Reed Army Medical Center with a cancer-related kidney ailment. After returning to work for two months in early 1986, he fell ill at a luncheon in March and lapsed into a coma on March 12. He died a month later, aged 61, and was buried in Saint John's Cemetery, Queens.

== Legacy ==
In 2001, Addabbo's son, Joseph P. Addabbo Jr., was elected as the New York City Council representative for District 32 in Queens. He was elected to the New York State Senate in 2008.

The Joseph P. Addabbo Family Health Center in Queens is named after Addabbo for his work in championing affordable healthcare while in Congress.

== See also ==
- List of members of the United States Congress who died in office (1950–1999)

U.S. House of Representatives
Preceded by Albert H. Bosch	Member of the U.S. House of Representatives from New York's 5th congressional district 1961–1963	Succeeded by Frank J. Becker
Preceded by James J. Delaney	Member of the U.S. House of Representatives from New York's 7th congressional district 1963–1983	Succeeded by Benjamin S. Rosenthal
Preceded by John LeBoutillier	Member of the U.S. House of Representatives from New York's 6th congressional district 1983–1986	Succeeded by Alton R. Waldon Jr.
