= New York's 14th State Senate district =

American legislative district

Senator
Leroy Comrie; D–St. Albans
- Registration: 75.8% Democratic; 5.6% Republican; 15.8% No party preference
- Demographics: 9% White; 49% Black; 19% Hispanic; 16% Asian
- Population (2017): 342,142
- Registered voters: 202,818

New York's 14th State Senate district is one of 63 districts in the New York State Senate. It has been represented by Democrat Leroy Comrie since 2015, following his 2014 Democratic primary defeat of incumbent Malcolm Smith.

== Geography ==
District 14 is located in eastern Queens, containing some or all of St. Albans, Cambria Heights, Jamaica, Hollis, Rosedale, Laurelton, Kew Gardens, and Queens Village.

The district overlaps with New York's 3rd, 5th, and 6th congressional districts, and with the 24th, 25th, 27th, 28th, 29th, 32nd, and 33rd districts of the New York State Assembly.

== Recent election results ==
=== 2026 ===
2026 New York State Senate election, District 14
Party	Candidate	Votes	%
Democratic	Leroy Comrie (incumbent)		
Write-in			
Total votes			100.0

=== 2024 ===
2024 New York State Senate election, District 14
Party	Candidate	Votes	%
Democratic	Leroy Comrie (incumbent)	89,194	99.0
Write-in		912	1.0
Total votes		90,106	100.0
Democratic hold			

=== 2022 ===
2022 New York State Senate election, District 14
Party	Candidate	Votes	%
Democratic	Leroy Comrie (incumbent)	57,872	99.2
Write-in		471	0.8
Total votes		58,343	100.0
Democratic hold			

=== 2020 ===
2020 New York State Senate election, District 14
Party	Candidate	Votes	%
Democratic	Leroy Comrie (incumbent)	110,626	98.9
Write-in		457	1.1
Total votes		111,083	100.0
Democratic hold			

=== 2018 ===
2018 New York State Senate election, District 14
Party	Candidate	Votes	%
Democratic	Leroy Comrie	76,188	
Working Families	Leroy Comrie	1,972	
Reform	Leroy Comrie	217	
Total	Leroy Comrie (incumbent)	78,377	99.7
Write-in		216	0.3
Total votes		78,593	100.0
Democratic hold			

=== 2016 ===
2016 New York State Senate election, District 14
Party	Candidate	Votes	%
Democratic	Leroy Comrie	95,067	
Working Families	Leroy Comrie	2,511	
Total	Leroy Comrie (incumbent)	97,578	92.0
Republican	Jarret Freeman	8,364	7.8
Write-in		216	0.2
Total votes		106,018	100.0
Democratic hold			

=== 2014 ===
2014 New York State Senate election, District 14
Primary election
Party	Candidate	Votes	%
Democratic	Leroy Comrie	10,229	68.8
Democratic	Malcolm Smith (incumbent)	2,865	19.3
Democratic	Munir Avery	1,738	11.7
Write-in		44	0.3
Total votes		14,876	100.0
General election
Democratic	Leroy Comrie	35,690	
Working Families	Leroy Comrie	1,776	
Total	Leroy Comrie	37,466	99.5
Write-in		198	0.5
Total votes		37,664	100.0
Democratic hold			

=== 2012 ===
2012 New York State Senate election, District 14
Party	Candidate	Votes	%
Democratic	Malcolm Smith	84,521	
Working Families	Malcolm Smith	1,398	
Total	Malcolm Smith (incumbent)	85,919	99.3
Write-in		602	0.7
Total votes		86,521	100.0
Democratic hold			

=== Federal results in District 14 ===
Year	Office	Results
2020	President	Biden 87.2 – 11.9%
2016	President	Clinton 89.9 – 8.4%
2012	President	Obama 92.6 – 7.0%
2012	Senate	Gillibrand 93.9 – 5.6%
