= Hollis, Queens =

Neighborhood in New York City

Hollis
- Neighborhood
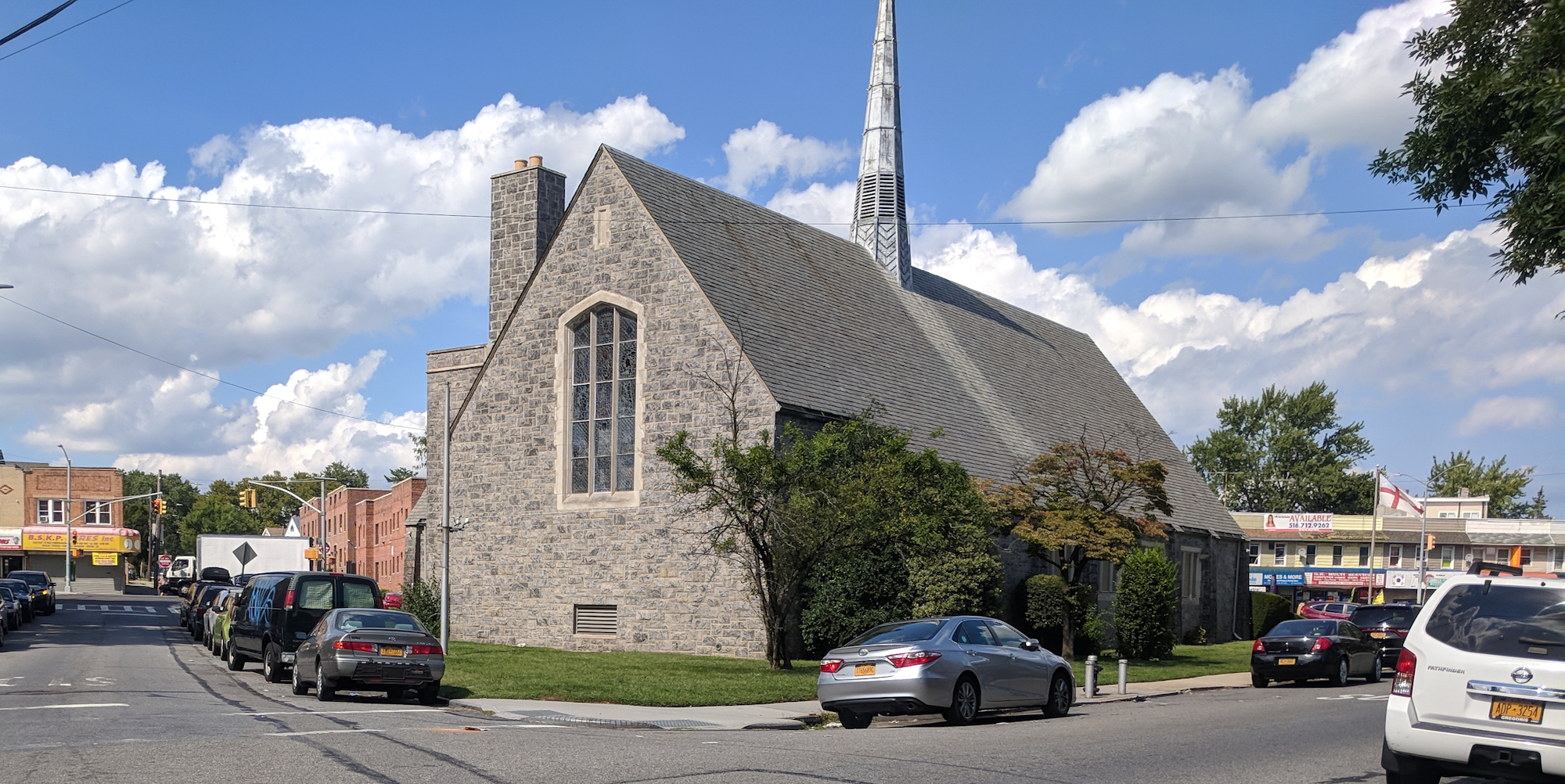
- St. Gabriel's Hollis Episcopal Church
- Interactive map of Hollis
- Coordinates: 40.71°N 73.76°W
- Country: United States
- State: New York
- City: New York City
- County/Borough: Queens
- Community District: Queens 12

Population (2010)
  - Total: 20,269

Ethnicity
  - Black: 64.0%
  - Asian: 10.7%
  - White: 2.3%
  - Native American: 0.6%
  - Hispanic: 13.2%
  - Other/Multiracial: 9.1%
- Time zone: UTC−5 (EST)
  - Summer (DST): UTC−4 (EDT)
- ZIP Codes: 11412, 11423
- Area codes: 718, 347, 929, and 917

Hollis is a residential middle-class neighborhood within the southeastern section of the New York City borough of Queens. Boundaries are considered to be 181st Street to the west, Hillside Avenue to the north, Francis Lewis Boulevard to the east, and Murdock Avenue to the south. Hollis is located between Jamaica to the west and Queens Village to the east.

Hollis is located in Queens Community District 12 and its ZIP Codes are 11423 and 11412. It is patrolled by the New York City Police Department's 103rd Precinct. Politically, Hollis is represented by the New York City Council's 23rd and 27th Districts.

== History ==
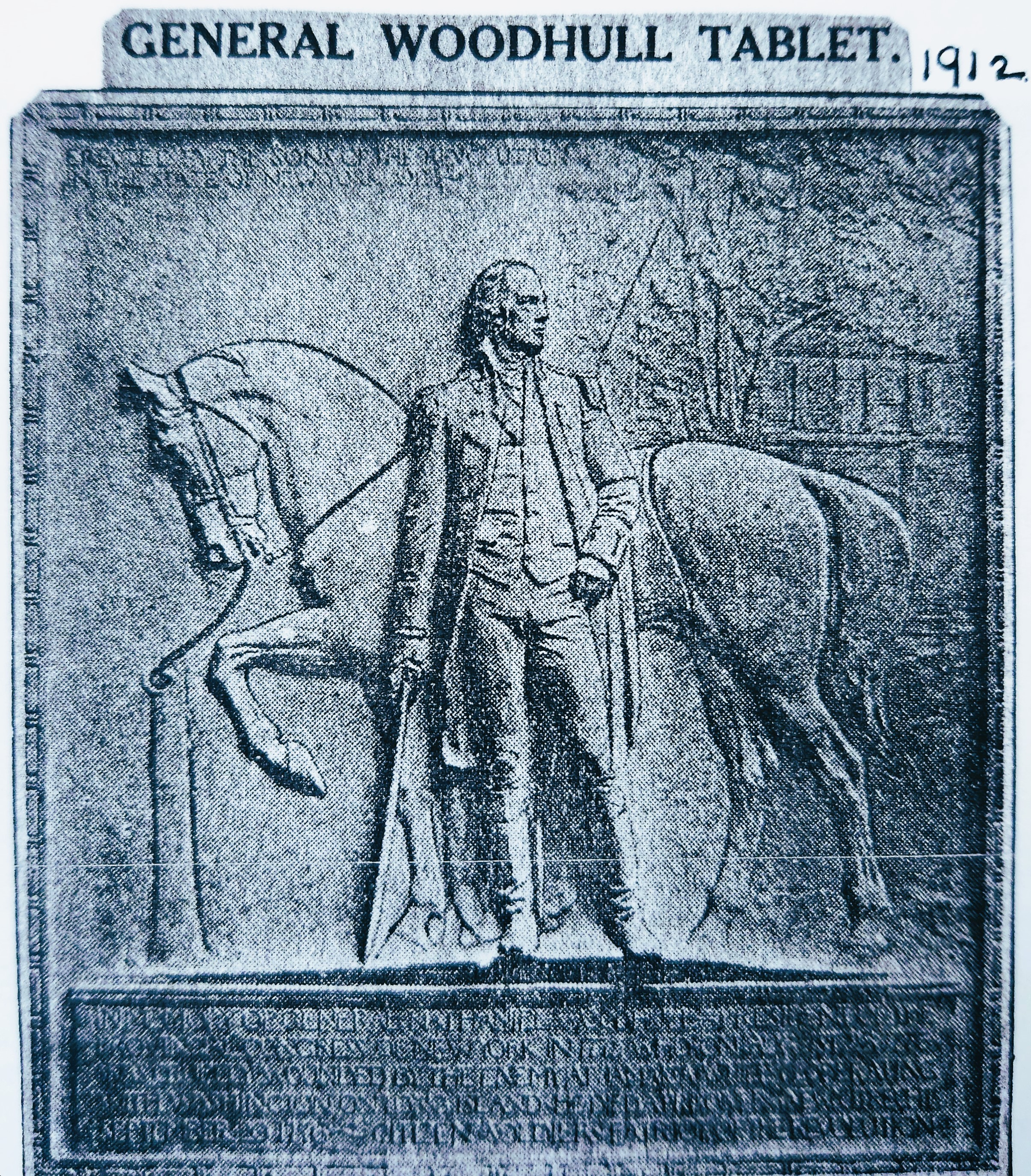
Woodhull Tablet P.S.35

The first European settlers were Dutch homesteaders in the 17th century. A century later, early in the American Revolutionary War, it was the site of part of the Battle of Long Island, a battle in which the revolutionary Brigadier General Nathaniel Woodhull was captured at a tavern on what is now Jamaica Avenue. Woodhull Avenue in Hollis is named after him. The area remained rural until 1885, when developers turned 136 acres (55 ha) into houses, and the area is still developed primarily with single-family houses. In 1898, it became a part of New York City with the western towns of Queens County. Since the end of the Korean War, the neighborhood has been settled primarily by African-American families. In recent years, the area has seen a large influx of South Asians and West Indians. The area has a majority of working parents with many early childhood schools in Hollis.

== Demographics ==
Based on data from the 2010 United States census, the population of Hollis was 20,269, a decrease of 478 (2.3%) from the 26,061 counted in 2000. Covering an area of 525.10 acres (212.50 ha), the neighborhood had a population density of 38.6 inhabitants per acre (24,700/sq mi; 9,500/km^{2}).

The racial makeup of the neighborhood was 64.0% (12,973) African American, 10.7% (2,167) Asian, 2.3% (460) White, 0.6% (126) Native American, 0.1% (20) Pacific Islander, 4.8% (974) from other races, and 4.3% (876) from two or more races. Hispanic or Latino of any race were 13.2% (2,673) of the population.

The entirety of Community Board 12, which mainly comprises Jamaica but also includes Hollis, had 232,911 inhabitants as of NYC Health's 2018 Community Health Profile, with an average life expectancy of 80.5 years. This is slightly lower than the median life expectancy of 81.2 for all New York City neighborhoods. Most inhabitants are youth and middle-aged adults: 22% are between the ages of between 0–17, 27% between 25 and 44, and 27% between 45 and 64. The ratio of college-aged and elderly residents was lower, at 10% and 14% respectively.

As of 2017, the median household income in Community Board 12 was $61,670. In 2018, an estimated 20% of Hollis and Jamaica residents lived in poverty, compared to 19% in all of Queens and 20% in all of New York City. One in eight residents (12%) were unemployed, compared to 8% in Queens and 9% in New York City. Rent burden, or the percentage of residents who have difficulty paying their rent, is 56% in Hollis and Jamaica, higher than the boroughwide and citywide rates of 53% and 51% respectively. Based on this calculation, as of 2018, Hollis and Jamaica are considered to be high-income relative to the rest of the city and not gentrifying.

== Police and crime ==
Hollis and Jamaica are patrolled by the 103rd Precinct of the NYPD, located at 168-02 91st Avenue. The 103rd Precinct ranked 51st safest out of 69 patrol areas for per-capita crime in 2010. As of 2018, with a non-fatal assault rate of 68 per 100,000 people, Hollis and Jamaica's rate of violent crimes per capita is more than that of the city as a whole. The incarceration rate of 789 per 100,000 people is higher than that of the city as a whole.

The 103rd Precinct has a lower crime rate than in the 1990s, with crimes across all categories having decreased by 80.6% between 1990 and 2018. The precinct reported 5 murders, 31 rapes, 346 robberies, 408 felony assaults, 152 burglaries, 466 grand larcenies, and 79 grand larcenies auto in 2018.

== Fire safety ==
Hollis contains a New York City Fire Department (FDNY) fire station, Engine Co. 301/Ladder Co. 150, at 91-04 197th Street.

== Health ==
As of 2018, preterm births and births to teenage mothers are more common in Hollis and Jamaica than in other places citywide. In Hollis and Jamaica, there were 10 preterm births per 1,000 live births (compared to 87 per 1,000 citywide), and 21.4 births to teenage mothers per 1,000 live births (compared to 19.3 per 1,000 citywide). Hollis and Jamaica have a low population of residents who are uninsured. In 2018, this population of uninsured residents was estimated to be 5%, lower than the citywide rate of 12%.

The concentration of fine particulate matter, the deadliest type of air pollutant, in Hollis and Jamaica is 0.007 milligrams per cubic metre (7.0×10^{−9} oz/ft^{3}), less than the city average. Eight percent of Hollis and Jamaica residents are smokers, which is lower than the city average of 14% of residents being smokers. In Hollis and Jamaica, 30% of residents are obese, 16% are diabetic, and 37% have high blood pressure—compared to the citywide averages of 22%, 8%, and 23% respectively. In addition, 23% of children are obese, compared to the citywide average of 20%.

Eighty-six percent of residents eat some fruits and vegetables every day, which is slightly less than the city's average of 87%. In 2018, 82% of residents described their health as "good", "very good", or "excellent", higher than the city's average of 78%. For every supermarket in Hollis and Jamaica, there are 20 bodegas.

The nearest major hospitals are Jamaica Hospital and Queens Hospital Center, both located in Jamaica.

== Post offices and ZIP Codes ==
Hollis is covered mainly by ZIP Code 11423, though the section south of 104th Avenue is part of 11412. The United States Post Office operates one post office nearby: at the Hollis Station at 197-40 Jamaica Avenue.

== Education ==
Hollis and Jamaica generally have a lower rate of college-educated residents than the rest of the city as of 2018. While 29% of residents age 25 and older have a college education or higher, 19% have less than a high school education and 51% are high school graduates or have some college education. By contrast, 39% of Queens residents and 43% of city residents have a college education or higher. The percentage of Hollis and Jamaica students excelling in math rose from 36% in 2000 to 55% in 2011, and reading achievement increased slightly from 44% to 45% during the same time period.

Hollis and Jamaica's rate of elementary school student absenteeism is more than the rest of New York City. In Hollis and Jamaica, 22% of elementary school students missed twenty or more days per school year, higher than the citywide average of 20%. Additionally, 74% of high school students in Hollis and Jamaica graduate on time, about the same as the citywide average of 75%.

=== Schools ===
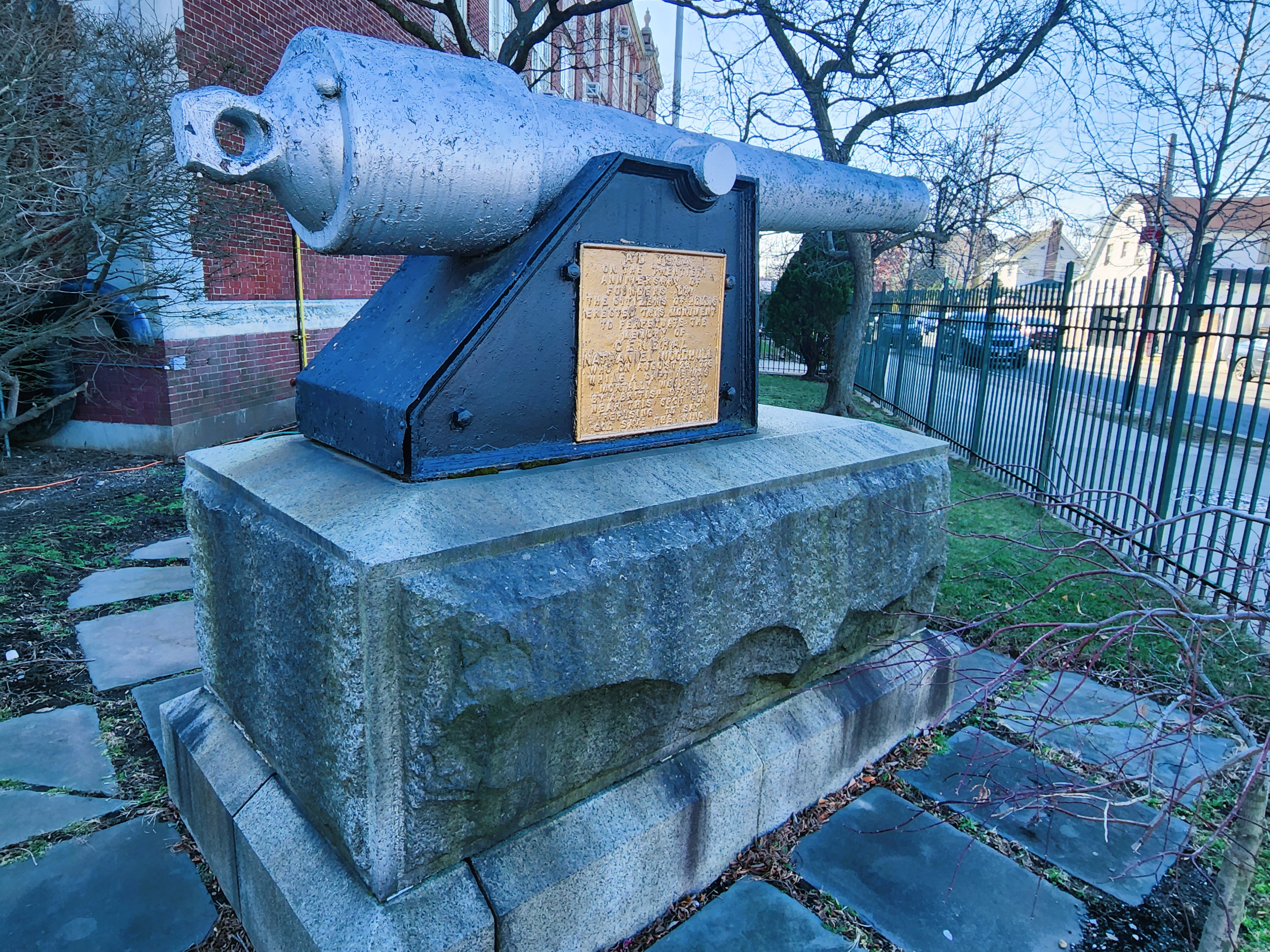
General Nathanial Woodhull Parrot rifle at P.S. 35

Hollis's public schools are operated by the New York City Department of Education. Hollis contains the following public elementary schools, which serve grades PK-5 unless otherwise indicated:

- P.S. 35 Nathaniel Woodhull
- P.S. 118 Lorraine Hansberry
- P.S. 134 Hollis

The following public middle and high schools are located in Hollis:

- I.S. 192 The Linden (grades 6–8)
- P.S. 233 (grades K-1, 6, 9–12)
- Pathways College Preparatory School A College Board School (grades 6–12)
- Cambria Heights Academy (grades 9–12)

=== Libraries ===
The Queens Public Library operates two branches in Hollis. The Hollis branch is located at 202-05 Hillside Avenue, and the South Hollis branch is located at 204-01 Hollis Avenue.

== Transportation ==
Long Island Rail Road service is available at the Hollis station, located at 193rd Street and Woodhull Avenue; The station is served mostly by the Hempstead Branch. West of Hollis station is the LIRR's Holban Yard, a freight yard that has been shared with St. Albans for over a century, and has included the Hillside Maintenance Facility since 1991. The MTA Regional Bus Operations' Q1, Q2, Q3, Q36, Q43, Q76, Q77, Q82 and Q110 buses serve Hollis. The Nassau Inter-County Express' n1, n6, n6X, n22, n24 and n26 service also stops at Hillside Avenue and Francis Lewis Boulevard, making drop-offs in the westbound direction and pick-ups in the eastbound direction.

The New York City Subway's E, F, and <F> trains stop nearby at Jamaica-179th Street on Hillside Avenue. The Archer Avenue lines were supposed to be extended to Hollis as part of Program for Action, a never-completed New York City Subway expansion in 1988.

== Parks ==
=== Liberty Triangle Park ===
Liberty Rock is a boulder in Liberty Triangle park at the intersection of Farmers Blvd. and Liberty Ave.

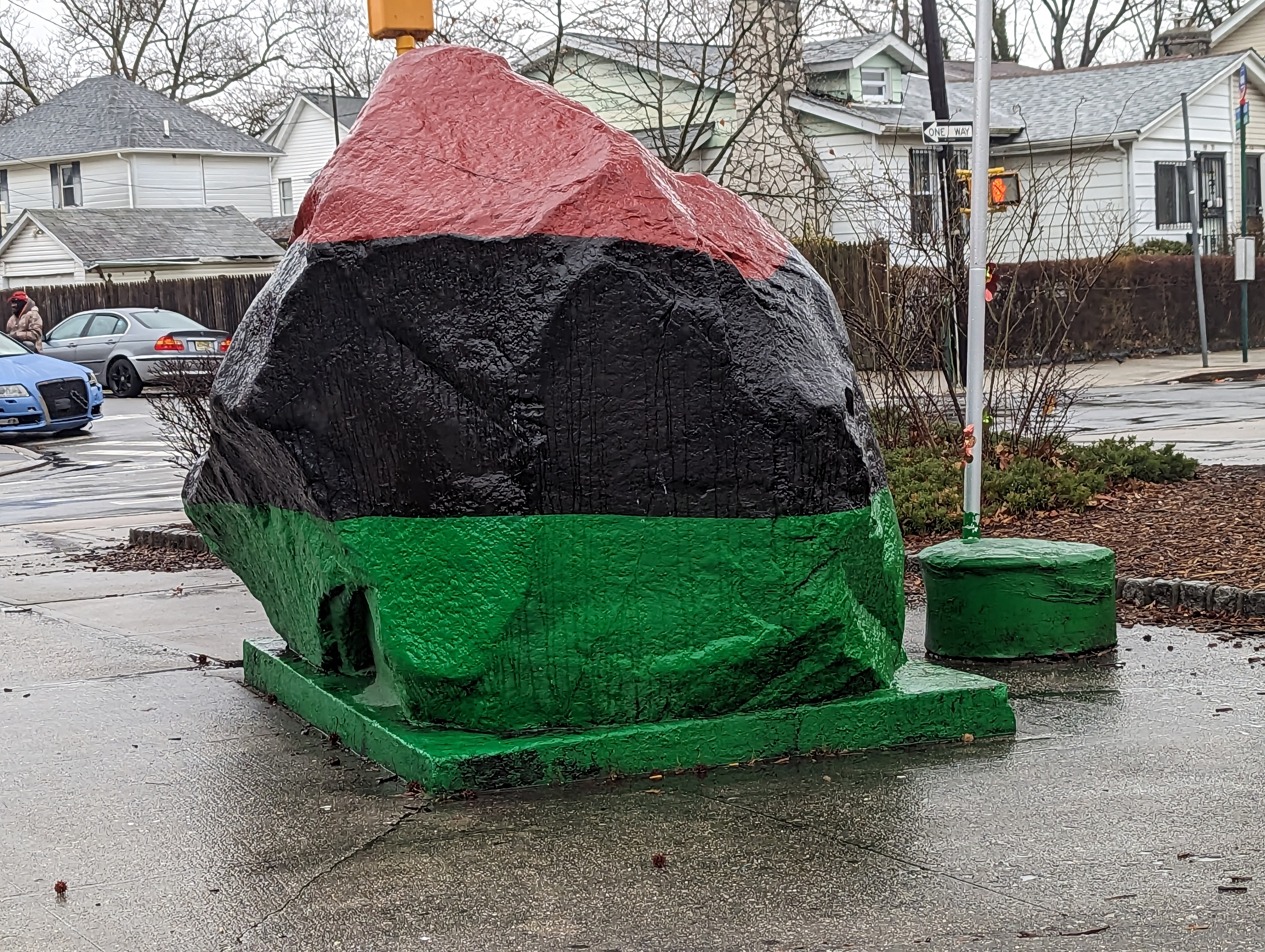
Liberty Rock, Hollis-St. Albans, Queens, New York

It was placed there in 1928 as a commemorative to the Pennsylvania Railroad casualties of World War One. Later, the plaque for that commemoration was removed and placed in an unknown location in the late 1960s. The character of the neighborhood changed to predominantly African-American, coincident with White flight.

The Liberty Rock became a symbol of the history and culture of the African American community in St. Albans. The painting of the rock in red, black, and green, the colors of the Pan-African flag, represents the community's commitment to civil rights, group identity, and fostering ties between all people of African descent. The location of the rock, at the intersection of St. Albans, Hollis, and Jamaica, highlights its significance as a shared symbol for the entire community. The Liberty Rock serves as a symbol of resistance and resilience, reminding the community of its rich cultural heritage and ongoing struggle for equality and justice. The Liberty Rock was originally erected as a World War I memorial in the late 1920s or early 1930s. It honored the soldiers who fought and died in the war. During his 1960 campaign JFK visited the 'Rock' on a whistlestop tour of Queens. On June 26, 1968, seventeen year olds Tony Tims and Daniel Gibson were the only people there initially when it was first painted; Tims claimed "I used my father's paint, met with Daniel. I would paint, he filmed it. I got the idea from a small rock that was painted red, black and green in the square located at 122nd & Farmers Blvd, That's the real story." Tims painted the rock red, black, and green to symbolize the Black Power and Pan-African movements. This act of community activism was a way for the residents to express their cultural pride and reclaim their community, which was beginning to face challenges such as crime, and neglect.

At the time, the Liberty Rock was located in a predominantly black neighborhood. Tony Tims and Daniel Gibson decided one afternoon to paint the rock after seeing a small rock painted in the red, black and green colors of liberation in a nearby square with the support of local businesses who donated a pint of the red paint the young men had run out of. The City of New York was initially opposed to the painted rock, but with the backing of the local store owners, the residents successfully challenged the city and kept the rock painted in the red, black, and green colors. However, the plaque honoring the war veterans was removed and placed elsewhere.

== Notable people ==
Since the beginning of hip-hop, the neighborhood has been a hotbed of talent, sparked primarily by the fact that hip-hop producer and icon Russell Simmons is from this community, as is his brother Joseph, who along with his friends Darryl McDaniels and Jason Mizell formed the rap group Run-D.M.C. (who had a hit with the seasonal song "Christmas in Hollis").

Other notable residents include:

- Augustus A. Beekman (1923–2001), New York City Fire Commissioner from 1978 to 1980.
- Black, Rock and Ron
- Byron Brown (born 1958), mayor of Buffalo, New York.
- Art Buchwald (1925–2007), political humorist.
- Lord Burgess (1924–2019), songwriter
- Jaki Byard (1922–1999), jazz musician
- Gloster B. Current (1913–1997), former deputy executive director of the National Association for the Advancement of Colored People also the National Director of Branches and Field Administration of the N.A.A.C.P. during the Civil Rights Movement.
- Roy Eldridge (1911–1989), jazz trumpeter
- Lani Guinier (1950–2022), civil rights legal scholar.
- Brian Hardgroove, bass player with Public Enemy.
- Roy Haynes (1925–2024), jazz drummer
- DJ Hurricane (born 1965), hip hop DJ, producer and rapper
- Royal Ivey (born 1981), assistant coach for the Brooklyn Nets and formerly for the New York Knicks.
- Ja Rule (born 1976), rapper
- Irv Gotti (born 1970), hip-hop producer and founder of Murder Inc Records.
- Milt Jackson (1923–1999), jazz vibraphonist and drummer
- Daymond John (born 1969), founder and CEO of FUBU.
- LL Cool J (born 1968), rapper and actor
- Ed Lover (born 1963), actor, radio and television personality
- Robert O. Lowery (1916–2001), Fire Marshal and First African-American Fire Commissioner, FDNY
- Gregory Weldon Meeks (born 1953), U.S. Representative for New York's 5th congressional district
- Lee Q. O'Denat, founder of World Star Hip Hop
- Garrett Oliver (born 1962), brewer and beer author who has been the brewmaster at the Brooklyn Brewery.
- Diane Patrick (born 1951), labor lawyer and former First Lady of Massachusetts (2007–2015)
- Run DMC, Hip-Hop group
  - Reverend Run
  - DMC
  - Jam Master Jay
- Rev. Al Sharpton (born 1954), civil rights activist
- Phil Schaap (1951–2021), jazz historian and broadcaster
- Russell Simmons (born 1957), co-founder of Def Jam
- Stephen A. Smith (born 1967), ESPN sports personality
- Andrew Young (born 1932), civil rights activist and former U.S. Ambassador to the United Nations
- Young MC (born 1967), rapper

Hollis was also home to many African American jazz musicians by the 1950s according to The New York Times.

== See also ==
- Odd Fellows Windmill, formerly located in Hollis
