= South Jamaica, Queens =

Neighborhood in New York City

South Jamaica
- Neighborhood of Queens
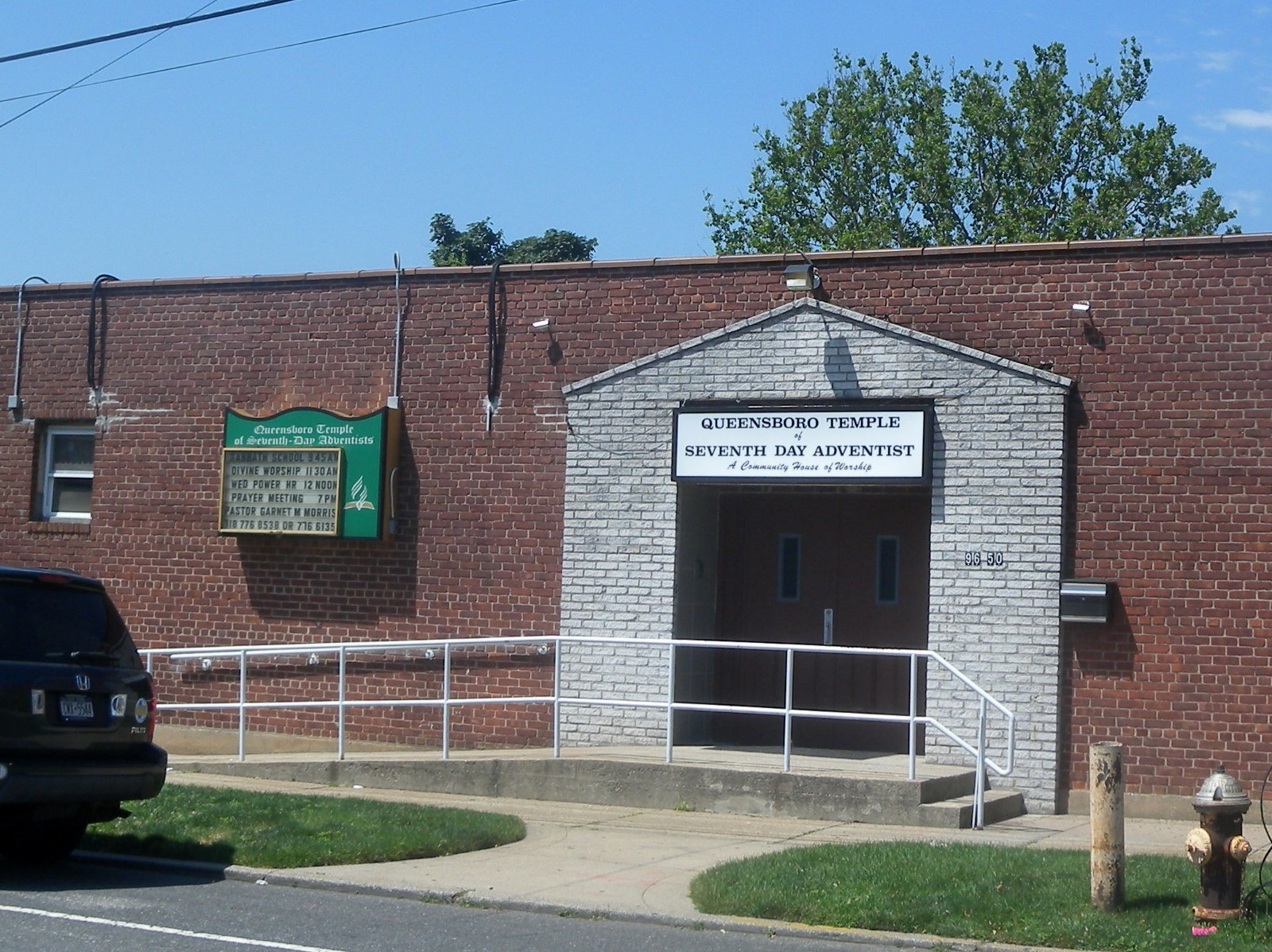
- A Seventh Day Adventist church in South Jamaica
- Location within New York City
- Coordinates: 40.68°N 73.79°W
- Country: United States
- State: New York
- City: New York City
- County/Borough: Queens
- Community District: Queens 12
- Named for: The Lenape word Yameco meaning "beaver"

Population (2010)
  - Total: 32,496

Race/Ethnicity
  - Black: 72.2%
  - Hispanic: 15.2
  - Asian: 5.2
  - White: 1.0
  - Other/Multiracial: 6.4
- Time zone: UTC−5 (EST)
  - Summer (DST): UTC−4 (EDT)
- ZIP Codes: 11433, 11434, 11435, 11436
- Area codes: 718, 347, 929, and 917

South Jamaica (also commonly known as "Southside") is a residential neighborhood in the New York City borough of Queens. It is located south of downtown Jamaica. Although a proper border has not been established, the neighborhood is a subsection of greater Jamaica bounded by the Long Island Rail Road Main Line tracks, Jamaica Avenue, or Liberty Avenue to the north; the Van Wyck Expressway on the west; Rockaway Boulevard on the south; and Merrick Boulevard on the east, adjoining the neighboring community of St. Albans. Other primary thoroughfares of South Jamaica include Baisley, Foch, Linden, Guy R. Brewer, and Sutphin Boulevards. The 180th Street Business Improvement District is responsible for the development of the area.

Considered a slum in the early 20th century, the neighborhood now consists of working-class and middle-class residents.

South Jamaica is located in Queens Community District 12 and its ZIP Codes are 11433 through 11436. It is patrolled primarily by the New York City Police Department's 113th Precinct, but also by the 103rd Precinct. Politically, South Jamaica is represented by the New York City Council's 27th and 28th Districts.

== Location ==
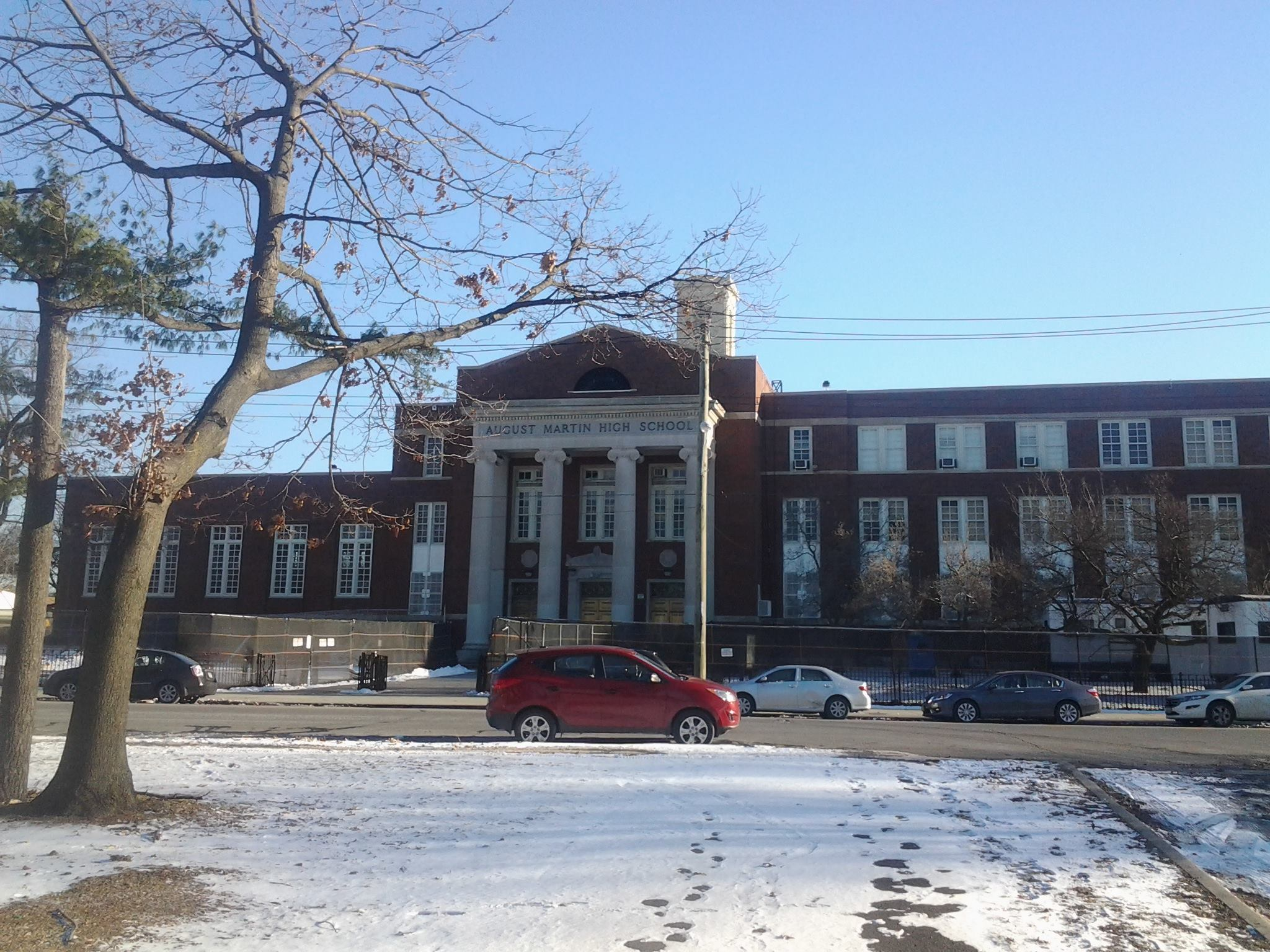
August Martin High School

South Jamaica is generally considered to be the area south of Downtown Jamaica (Jamaica Center) or Jamaica Avenue, with the Van Wyck Expressway to the west, and Merrick Boulevard to the east. The eastern border extends as far as the LIRR Montauk Branch tracks in the northern part of the neighborhood. John F. Kennedy International Airport lies to the south across the Belt Parkway. This area overlaps with the neighborhoods of St. Albans to the east, and Rochdale and Springfield Gardens to the south. Many maps however consider South Jamaica to be bounded by Linden Boulevard to the north, and Rockaway Boulevard and Baisley Boulevard to the south, with the section north of Linden Boulevard (including the South Jamaica Houses) defined as part of Jamaica. Other maps consider the area between Linden Boulevard and Baisley/Rockaway Boulevards to be a southern subsection of South Jamaica called Baisley Park; Baisley Pond Park, the Baisley Park Houses, the Baisley Park Branch of Queens Public Library, and the Baisley Park Bus Depot are located in this area. The neighborhood south of Rockaway and Baisley Boulevards to the Belt Parkway (including Rochdale Village) historically has been considered part of South Jamaica, but is now often mapped as Springfield Gardens North or Rochdale. The three sections constitute the western half of Queens Community Board 12.

South Jamaica is covered by the 113th Precinct of the New York City Police Department.

== Nicknames ==
South Jamaica is often referred to as "Southside" or "Southside Jamaica" (also spelled as "South Side"). This is said to be derived from the location of the neighborhood and its demographics; Hollis, Queens in the northeast corner of greater Jamaica and Queens CB12 is referred to as "Northside". The South Side nickname dates back to the first half of the 20th century, when several local community organizations carried the name. An additional nickname, "South Suicide Queens", is a reference to the high crime rate in the neighborhood since the 1980s.

== History ==
=== Etymology ===
South Jamaica is named for its location south of Jamaica; the name Jamaica itself is derived from the Lenape word Yameco meaning "beaver". This was reflected in the naming of Beaver Pond at the border of Jamaica and South Jamaica. Through the 20th century, the neighborhood was also known as Cedar Manor.

=== 17th century to 1930s ===
Through the 19th century, what is now South Jamaica consisted of farmland. Early developments in South Jamaica included the Prospect Cemetery opened in 1668, and the Prospect and St. Monica's Churches opened around 1857. Baisley Pond, created by local farmers from dammed streams, was acquired by the City of Brooklyn's Williamsburg Water Works Company in 1852 for municipal water supplies.

The Jamaica Race Course was opened in 1894 at Baisley Boulevard and New York Avenue (today's Guy R. Brewer Bouelvard), and expanded in the early 1900s. Some sources state its official opening year as 1903. Transportation was introduced into the neighborhood at the turn of the century. The Far Rockaway Line streetcar was opened along New York Avenue between downtown Jamaica and the Jamaica Racetrack on September 1, 1896, and was extended to the Rockaways by summer 1897. The Cedar Manor station opened at Linden Boulevard along the LIRR Atlantic Branch in 1906. The Queens Boulevard Line streetcar to Midtown Manhattan was extended along Sutphin Boulevard to 109th Avenue in South Jamaica in April 1916. Baisley Pond Park was opened by the city in 1919.

In the 1920s, the neighborhood's population exploded after streets were laid down and houses constructed. Many African Americans began moving into the neighborhood at this time, while White residents began leaving the neighborhood, coinciding with other white flight periods in the city. By the 1930s, the neighborhood was considered to be predominantly Black, especially in contrast to other southeast Queens neighborhoods, although a significant White population remained. At this time, the neighborhood was considered a major slum, due to overcrowding, high crime, and lack of infrastructure. Many houses were frame houses constructed only of wood and were not fireproof, while residences in the neighborhood were without modern utilities such as electricity and indoor plumbing. The Jamaica Racetrack, meanwhile, was blamed for bringing down property values, and was in poor operating condition.

=== Urban renewal ===
In 1939, the city began slum clearance projects in the neighborhood. The first was the South Jamaica Houses public housing project, originally referred to as the "'South Jamaica' slum clearance project", opened in July 1940. A second portion of the project opened in 1954. By 1955, following the takeover of the Jamaica Race Course by the Greater New York Association, the city and city planner Robert Moses began evaluating plans to replace the track with new development. Plans included an additional public housing development, and one of several potential Queens sites for the failed relocation of the Brooklyn Dodgers. In October 1956, Moses planned a middle-income cooperative to be constructed on the site. The track was closed in 1959 and demolished in 1960, replaced by an expanded Aqueduct Racetrack.

In 1959, the LIRR Atlantic Branch was grade-separated, leading to the closure of the Cedar Manor station. The Baisley Park Houses were opened in 1961. Rochdale Village opened in December 1963 on the former Jamaica Racetrack site, bringing with it the neighborhood's first supermarkets and shopping centers. The Cedar Manor Co-op opened around this time as well. By this time, the neighborhood was overwhelmingly Black, with the exception of the racially integrated Rochdale Village. In 1970, the New York City Board of Higher Education approved plans to replace 50 acres (20 ha) of slum land with a permanent campus for York College. The site included the Prospect Cemetery and the Prospect and St. Monica's Churches. At the same time, under the Program for Action the Metropolitan Transportation Authority planned to extend subway service into the neighborhood, by connecting the LIRR Atlantic Branch with the planned Archer Avenue subway in downtown Jamaica via a ramp in or near the campus site. The subway connection was never constructed, due to funding issues caused by the city's fiscal crisis. The York College campus, also delayed by the fiscal crisis, began construction in 1980 and opened in stages beginning in 1988.

=== 1970s to 1990s ===
Despite urban renewal efforts, in 1966 South Jamaica was designated an official poverty zone by the administration of President Lyndon B. Johnson during the president's War on Poverty, and was considered one of the few remaining slums in the otherwise middle-class borough of Queens. In the late 1960s and continuing through the 1970s, South Jamaica and other Southeast Queens neighborhoods saw increasing rates of drug sales and usage, including cocaine and heroin epidemics. The neighborhood also had some of the highest rates of automobile theft in the city, attributed to the proximity to car theft rings centered in John F. Kennedy International Airport. In 1972, South Jamaica was declared "the largest officially designated poverty area in Queens" by the Human Resources Administration.

The neighborhood was also the center of several racial issues in the 1970s. Students from South Jamaica were bused into other school districts in order to maintain integration of schools, leading to outcry from White residents of those districts. Other racial events included the shooting of Clifford Glover on April 28, 1973 by a plainclothes NYPD officer. The acquittal of the officer and his partner led to incidents of looting, rioting, and incidents of violence against Whites in South Jamaica and Downtown Jamaica.

In the 1980s and 1990s, South Jamaica was one of several New York City neighborhoods victimized by the national crack cocaine epidemic. Several gangs operated in the neighborhood. The Corley gang operated out of the South Jamaica Houses. The Supreme Team, formed in 1981 by Kenneth "Supreme" McGriff, operated out of the Baisley Park Houses. The cartel of Lorenzo "Fat Cat" Nichols was also headquartered in the neighborhood, supplying much of the cocaine in the area and around Queens. These groups had originated from the Seven Crowns gang that was started during the cocaine and heroin epidemic in the 1970s, and which expanded into a multi-state operation by the 1980s. Increases in murder rates and other crime followed the spike in drug-related activity. In 1986, the 113th and 103rd police precincts led Queens in murder incidents, with the 113th precinct ranking tenth in the city. On February 26, 1988, rookie police officer Edward Byrne was killed while guarding the house of a witness in a drug-related trial. Byrne's murder, and other violent crime in the neighborhood led South Jamaica to become a symbol for the national drug epidemic, and the city's war on drugs instigated by Mayor Ed Koch. Following the killing, Koch created the Tactical Narcotics Team (TNT) program, with the first team dispatched to South Jamaica on March 14, 1988.

=== 2000s ===
Entering the 21st century, South Jamaica has seen a revival in terms of safety and quality of life. While crime is still higher than other Queens areas, the NYPD 113th Precinct (which also patrols Hollis, St. Albans and Springfield Gardens) saw dramatic decreases in violent crime since the 1990s, with a drop in major crime of 76 percent between 1993 and 2010.

== Demographics ==
Based on data from the 2020 United States Census, the population of South Jamaica was 270,688, an increase of 231,794 from the 38,894 counted in 2010. Covering an area of 918.87 acres (371.85 ha), the neighborhood had a population density of 42.3 inhabitants per acre (27,100/sq mi; 10,500/km^{2}).

The racial makeup of the neighborhood was 55% African American, 1.0% White, 0% Native American, 16% Asian, 0% Pacific Islander, 6% from other races, and 5% from two or more races. Hispanic or Latino of any race were 16% of the population.

South Jamaica is predominantly African-American with a strong majority of Afro-Caribbean descent. In recent decades, the Hispanic community has expanded, with residents from Mexico, El Salvador, Puerto Rico, and the Dominican Republic moving to the area. Guyanese and Bangladeshis make up much of the larger portion of newcomers to the community. Bengalis can be found mostly around Sutphin and Merrick Boulevards along 145th, 153rd, 157th, and 170th Streets; South Road; and 105th, 107th, and 109th Avenues. There is also a small population of Haitians, Pakistanis and Trinidadians who live in this area.

== Housing ==
The area is largely a middle-class community consisting of suburban one- and two-family houses ranging from colonials built around the 1960s to new developments.

A small section of South Jamaica is named Bricktown, for its many brick row houses.

A number of smaller apartment buildings along with some public housing projects are also located in the area. This includes the NYCHA-operated Baisley Park Houses and South Jamaica Houses housing projects, as well as the Rochdale Village and Cedar Manor Co-op developments, and the Baisley Park Garden development (also known as Baisley Gardens).

== Police and crime ==
South Jamaica and St. Albans are patrolled by the NYPD's 113th Precinct, located at 167-02 Baisley Boulevard. The 113th Precinct ranked 55th safest out of 69 patrol areas for per-capita crime in 2010. The 113th Precinct also has a lower crime rate than in the 1990s, with crimes across all categories having decreased by 86.1% between 1990 and 2018. The precinct reported 5 murders, 28 rapes, 156 robberies, 383 felony assaults, 153 burglaries, 414 grand larcenies, and 138 grand larcenies auto in 2018.

== Post offices and ZIP Codes ==
South Jamaica is covered by multiple ZIP Codes. West of Sutphin Boulevard, South Jamaica falls under ZIP Codes 11435 north of Linden Boulevard and 11436 south of Linden Boulevard. East of Sutphin Boulevard, South Jamaica is part of two ZIP Codes: 11433 north of Linden Boulevard and 11434 south of Linden Boulevard. The United States Post Office operates the Rochdale Village Station post office at 165-100 Baisley Boulevard.

== Education ==
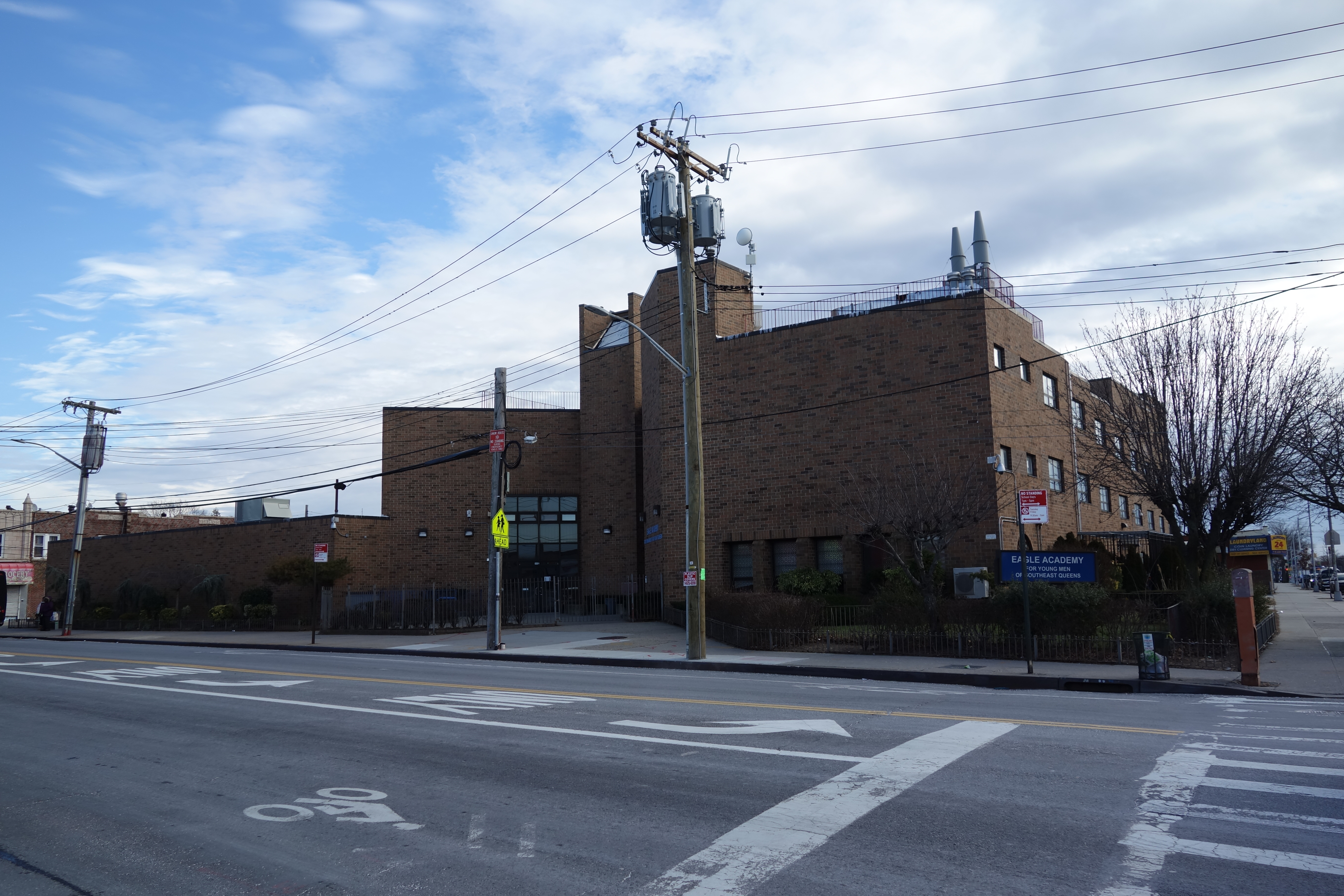
Eagle Academy for Young Men III at Merrick and Linden Boulevards.

=== Public and charter schools ===
Several elementary schools are located in South Jamaica:

- Samuel Huntington School (P.S. 40), on 109th Avenue and Union Hall Street near the South Jamaica Houses.
- William Wordsworth School (P.S. 48), on 155th Street and 108th Avenue, two blocks west of the South Jamaica Houses. It is a New York CIty designated landmark for its Art Deco design.
- Walter Francis Bishop School (P.S. 160), on Inwood Street off of Sutphin Boulevard.
- P.S. 123, on 119th Avenue between Inwood Street and 145th Street, just south of Foch Boulevard.
- Edward K. Ellington School (P.S. 140), on 116th Avenue east of Brewer Boulevard; named after Duke Ellington.
- Ruby S. Couche Elementary School (P.S. 30) and P.S. 354, on Baisley Boulevard and Bedell Street in Rochdale Village.
- Lyndon B. Johnson School (P.S. 223), on Sutphin Boulevard just north of Rockaway Boulevard adjacent to the Baisley Park Garden development; named after U.S. President Lyndon B. Johnson.
- Clarence Witherspoon School (P.S. 45), on Rockaway Boulevard and 150th Street across from Baisley Pond Park and Baisley Park Garden.
- Talfourd Lawn Elementary School (P.S. 50), on 101st Avenue and Allendale Street one block north of Liberty Avenue, and just west of the Van Wyck Expressway.
- Thurgood Marshall Magnet School (P.S. 80), on 137th Avenue in Rochdale Village; named after Thurgood Marshall.
- Rochdale Early Advantage Charter School, on Baisley Boulevard and 165th Street across from Rochdale Village.

Middle and junior high schools include:

- Junior High School 40, adjacent to P.S. 40.
- Richard Grossley Junior High School (J.H.S. 8), just off of Merrick Boulevard between 108th and 109th Avenues.
- Eagle Academy for Young Men of Southeast Queens (Eagle Academy III), a middle and high school located at Merrick and Linden Boulevards.
- Catherine and Count Basie School (M.S. 72; formerly J.H.S. 72), on Brewer Boulevard in Rochdale Village.
- York Early College Academy, a middle and high school in the M.S. 72 building on Brewer Boulevard in Rochdale Village.

High schools include:

- August Martin High School, a vocational aviation school, on Baisley Boulevard on the south side of Baisley Pond Park; named after Tuskegee Airmen Army Air Forces pilot August Martin.
- Eagle Academy for Young Men III
- The High School for Law Enforcement and Public Safety, on Brewer Boulevard and 116th Avenue just north of Foch Boulevard, adjacent to the Baisley Park Houses.
- Queens High School for the Sciences, a specialized high school, located on the York College campus.
- York Early College Academy

The closest zoned high school is Hillcrest High School just north of Hillside Avenue in Jamaica. Richmond Hill High School is located west of the Van Wyck Expressway in Richmond Hill. Many other regional high schools serving the area have since been converted into educational campuses, housing multiple small high schools. The closest educational campuses are the Jamaica Campus (formerly Jamaica High School) near the Grand Central Parkway to the north, and Springfield Gardens Educational Campus (formerly Springfield Gardens High School) to the south. Campus Magnet (formerly Andrew Jackson High School) is located in Cambria Heights to the east. John Adams Educational Campus (formerly John Adams High School) is located in Ozone Park to the west. The Young Women's Leadership School of Queens was formerly located in the P.S. 40 facility, but is now located across from Hillcrest High School.

Other schools:

- Queens Transitional Center or Queens Transition Center (former J.H.S. 142/I.S. 142), a special education school at Linden Boulevard and 142nd Street (142-10 Linden Boulevard). The facility also houses a branch of The School of Cooperative and Technical Education (Coop Tech), and the Jamaica campus of Queens Academy High School.

=== Higher education ===
The campus of CUNY York College is located at the north end of South Jamaica, between the LIRR Main Line to the north and South Road to the south, across from the South Jamaica Houses.

=== Libraries ===
The Queens Public Library operates three branches in South Jamaica:

- The Baisley Park branch at 117-11 Sutphin Boulevard
- The Rochdale Village branch at 169-09 137th Avenue
- The South Jamaica branch at 108-41 Guy R Brewer Boulevard

== Parks and recreation ==
Baisley Pond Park has over 100 acres (0.40 km^{2}) of outdoor recreational space, including a 30-acre (0.12 km^{2}) pond.

== Notable businesses ==
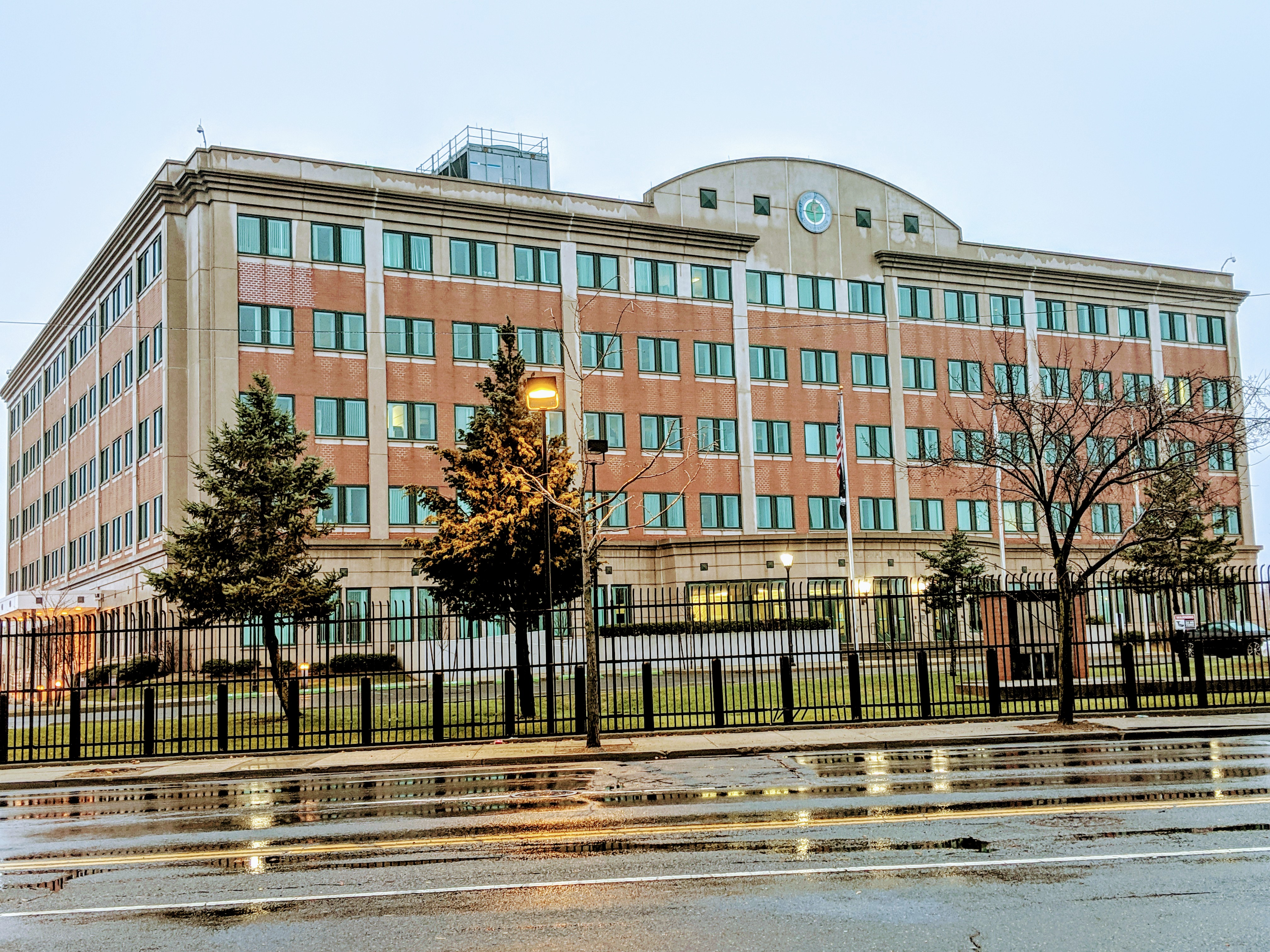
Federal Aviation Administration regional offices

The Federal Aviation Administration Eastern Region has its offices at Rockaway Boulevard in South Jamaica, near JFK Airport.

== Points of interest ==
St. Monica's Church, St. Monica's Cemetery, and Prospect Cemetery are all located on the current York College campus.

The Jamaica Race Course, a former horse racing facility, was located in South Jamaica. The site is now occupied by Rochdale Village.

== Transportation ==
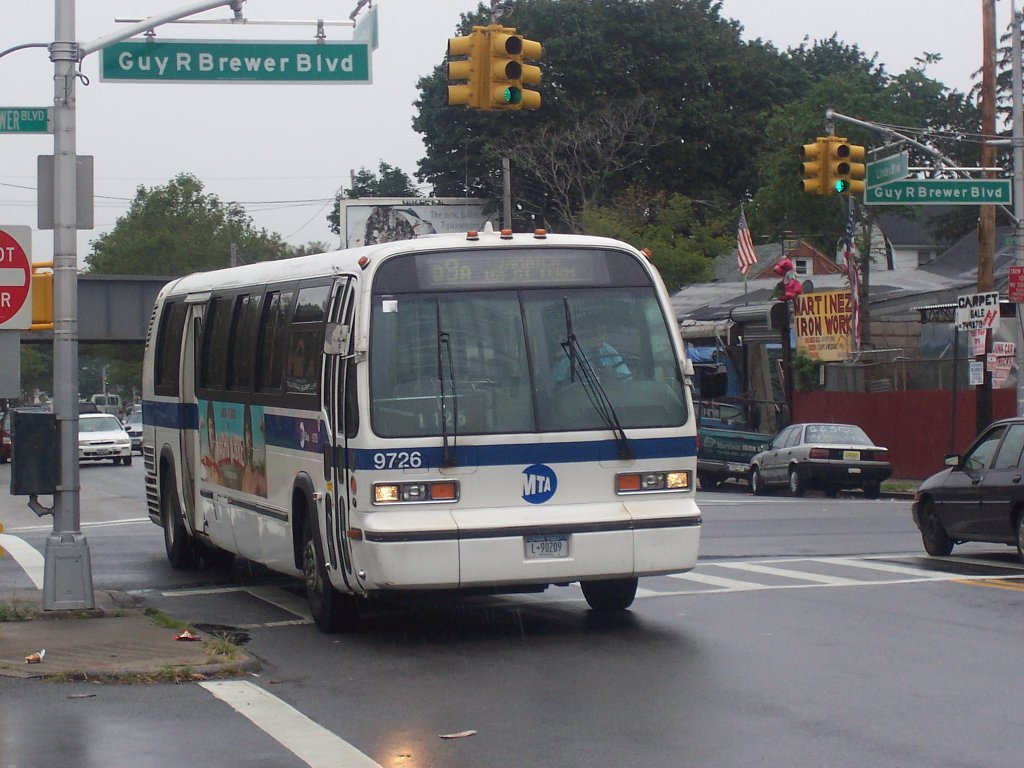
A bus at Linden and Brewer Boulevards along the former Q9A route, discontinued in 2010

The AirTrain JFK route transports people between Jamaica and JFK International Airport on its elevated route over the Van Wyck Expressway without stopping. A southern extension of the New York City Subway's IND Archer Avenue Line to South Jamaica was planned under the 1968 Program for Action by way of the LIRR Atlantic Branch, but not completed.

Numerous MTA bus lines run through the neighborhood, including the Q4, Q5, Q6, Q7, Q9, Q40, Q51, Q60, Q84, Q85, Q86, Q87, Q89, Q111, Q112, Q113, Q114, Q115 and QM65.

== Notable residents ==
- 50 Cent (born 1975 as Curtis Jackson), rapper and actor
- Rafer Alston (born 1976), former NBA basketball player.
- Lloyd Banks (born 1982), rapper
- Bob Beamon (born 1946), Olympic athlete and world record holder in the long jump for 23 years.
- Yummy Bingham (born 1986), singer
- Mario Cuomo (1932–2015), former Governor of New York.
- Sticky Fingaz (born 1973), rapper, actor and member of Onyx
- Frenchie, rapper
- G-Unit, rap group
- Diana Gordon, singer
- Grafh (born 1982 as Phillip Anthony Bernard), rapper
- Milford Graves (1941–2021), free-jazz drummer
- Maurice Harkless, NBA basketball player.
- Roi Heenok (born 1973), rapper
- Robert Jones (born 1979), head men's basketball coach at Norfolk State
- Sutter Kain, rapper and producer
- Kwamé, rapper and producer
- Curtis McDowald (born 1996), épée fencer who competed in the 2020 Summer Olympics.
- Nicki Minaj (born 1982 as Onika Tanya Maraj), rapper
- Pharoahe Monch, rapper and member of Organized Konfusion
- Kyle O'Quinn (born 1990), professional basketball player
- Lamar Odom (born 1979), former NBA basketball player
- Onyx, rap group
- Metta Sandiford-Artest (born 1979 as Ron Artest), NBA basketball player
- Fredro Starr (born 1971), rapper and member of Onyx
- Supreme, drug lord and leader of the Supreme Team who operated from the Baisley Park Projects
- Lost Boyz, rap group
- Mr. Cheeks, rapper
- Nuttin' But Stringz, duo
- Waka Flocka Flame, rapper
- Sha Money XL, music producer
- Mopreme Shakur (born 1967), rapper
- Supreme Team, drug trafficking gang
- Ali Vegas, rapper and member of The Drama Kingz
- Tony Yayo (born 1978), rapper
- Richard W. Roberts, Chief Judge Emeritus, U.S. District Court, District of Columbia
