= Murder of Timothy Caughman =

2017 murder in New York City, US

- Murder of Timothy Caughman (Manhattan) Murder of Timothy Caughman (New York City) Murder of Timothy Caughman (New York) Murder of Timothy Caughman (the United States)
- Location: 40°45′17″N 73°59′43″W; Hell's Kitchen, Manhattan, New York, U.S.
- Date: March 20, 2017; 9 years ago (EDT)
- Target: African American men
- Attack type: Stabbing, hate crime, terrorism
- Weapons: 26-inch mini sword; two knives (unused)
- Deaths: 1
- Injuries: 0
- Victim: Timothy Caughman (killed)
- Perpetrator: James Harris Jackson
- Motive: White supremacy
- Verdict: Life without parole
- Convictions: First degree murder

On March 20, 2017, Timothy Caughman, a black 66-year-old man, was collecting cans for recycling in the Hell's Kitchen neighborhood of Manhattan, New York City when James Harris Jackson, a white 28-year-old man, approached him and stabbed him multiple times with a sword. Caughman later died of his injuries. Jackson subsequently turned himself in to police custody and confirmed that he traveled from Maryland to New York with the intention of killing black men in order to prevent white women from having interracial relationships with them.

== Attack ==
Jackson traveled by bus from his home in Baltimore, Maryland to New York City on March 17 with the intention of killing black men in order to prevent white women from having interracial relationships with them, according to reports. He stayed at the Hotel Times Square on West 46th Street. On March 20, Jackson allegedly walked up to Caughman with an 18-inch sword and stabbed him to death in the Hell's Kitchen neighborhood. Jackson turned himself in to police on March 22. According to police, Jackson told them that he planned to attack more black men in Times Square.

== Victim ==
Timothy Caughman was born in 1950 or 1951 in New York City, the son of Tula Caughman, a home health care aide, and William Caughman, the pastor of Mount Zion Baptist Church. Growing up in the South Jamaica Houses, a housing project in Jamaica, Queens, Caughman earned the nickname “Hard Rock” for being a skilled boxer and street fighter.

Caughman spent his entire life in New York City, earning an associate degree after attending college in Brooklyn and Staten Island and working as a social worker in Queens, including several years running a division of the Neighborhood Youth Corps, a federal antipoverty program. After this, Caughman held a number of jobs including club promoter, and spent the last 20 years of his life living in a room at the Barbour Hotel on West 36th Street in Hells Kitchen. While many residents of the Barbour were individuals transitioning from homelessness, Caughman was a permanent tenant.

Described as an avid reader and “a benevolent man content with an unassuming life”, Caughman reportedly enjoyed discussing religion and philosophy “over unhurried meals of turkey bacon and grits at local diners.” He used cash earned as a can and bottle recycler to help pay for his room and simple indulgences like trips to Washington, DC, where he enjoyed attending congressional hearings. He was a collector of celebrity autographs and had an active social media presence on Twitter, posting about his desire to visit California and commenting, on a 2016 Election Day selfie, “I love America.”

== Perpetrator ==
James Harris Jackson, (born May 26, 1988), a Baltimore, Maryland native, turned himself in to police and said he took the bus to Manhattan to kill black men, whom he said he had hated for over ten years. The weapon used by Jackson was a "Roman short sword" hidden in his pants.

Jackson was born to a liberal household, and lived in an "almost all-white" area outside Baltimore. His grandfather, who was from Louisiana, supported racial integration and frequently was the target of cross burnings on his lawn. Jackson expressed racist views as young as three and shared them only with "like-minded people." Jackson had also voted for Barack Obama in the 2008 presidential election and opposed Republican vice presidential candidate Sarah Palin, saying, "I couldn't let Palin get in there. She's stupid." Jackson had graduated in 2007 from Friends School of Baltimore a Quaker school. Jackson would later serve in the United States military as an intelligence analyst in the Afghan capital of Kabul in 2009 stating he enjoyed "the sense of mission" in 2010 and 2011 before being honorably discharged after winning several awards in 2012.

Jackson stated that he had been thinking about killing black men "for a long time, for the past couple years, for the past couple years. I figured I would end up getting shot by the police, kill myself, or end up in jail". Jackson said he picked New York because he wanted to make a statement. He was charged with second-degree murder at a March 23 arraignment, though the prosecutor is reportedly working on upgrading the charge to the first degree, as well as adding a hate crime charge. He did not apply for bail and was held pending his next court date on March 27. In an exclusive interview at Rikers Island with The New York Daily News, Jackson had mentioned the neo-Nazi website The Daily Stormer though he had neither confirmed nor denied ever being a reader. Jackson told the Daily News that he regretted killing Caughman and wished to kill younger African-Americans such as "a young thug" and "a successful older black man with blondes". Jackson also expressed white nationalist views such as belief in the white genocide conspiracy theory "The white race is being eroded [...] No one cares about you. The Chinese don't care about you, the blacks don't care about you".

Jackson's YouTube channel contained alt-right, neo-Nazi, Holocaust denial, MGTOW, pro-Trump, and white nationalist content. Some of the videos shared were "Is It Time for Whites to Start Voicing Displeasure With Black on White Crimes?", and "Blacks Know That Blacks Are Violent So Why Does the White Media Pretend They Are Not".

Courtroom and police interview videos were released later. Jackson stated that his killing was "an amateurish, slipshod version" of "a terrorist attack". Jackson described interracial couples as "an insurmountable problem [...] I mean, that's the main problem for me". Jackson believed that blacks "need to be exterminated" and stated that "In my opinion, blacks are inferior people" and believed that "I think we should just preserve the best people and get rid of all the dead weight." He also said that his killing of Caughman was "practice" for other attacks on interracial couples and mentioned that he had stalked between 10 and 15 individuals or groups almost carrying out two attacks with the same knife but hesitated though he planned on killing several blacks with white women. Jackson did not express remorse for his actions stating "No. He's a homeless black guy" and said "It was weird. I didn't feel great. I didn't feel horrible either. I thought it (the stabbing) would send me into a bloody rage fury." Jackson also stated that the killing was intended to start a race war in a manifesto written by him: "The racial World War starts today. This political terrorist attack is a formal declaration of a global total war on the Negro races".

== Aftermath ==
On March 27, 2017, Jackson was charged with one count each of murder in the first and second degrees as an act of terrorism, second-degree murder as a hate crime, and three counts of criminal possession of a weapon in the New York State Supreme Court. After initially planning on going to trial, Jackson pled guilty to the murder in January 2019 and was sentenced to life without parole the following month, on February 13, 2019. He is now serving his sentence at Clinton Correctional Facility, in Dannemora, New York.
