= Howard Mason =

American drug trafficker

- Born: September 8, 1959 (age 67)
- Other name: Pappy
- Occupations: Drug trafficker, organized crime figure
- Known for: Murder of Edward Byrne
- Status: Incarcerated at USP Allenwood
- Allegiance: The Bebos
- Penalty: Life imprisonment

Details
- Victims: Edward Byrne

Howard "Pappy" Mason (born September 8, 1959) is an American drug trafficker and organized crime figure. Mason and his partner, Lorenzo "Fat Cat" Nichols, ran a drug smuggling gang called the Bebos, in the Jamaica, Queens, neighborhood of New York City. The gang sold drugs and netted as much as $200,000 per month in profit. Mason is serving a life sentence in federal prison.

== Murder of Edward Byrne ==
From behind bars on gun charges, Mason ordered the 1988 murder of a police officer, Edward Byrne, which led to increased law enforcement attention and Mason's eventual arrest and conviction on various charges. A month after the killing, Mason was sentenced to seven years in prison on gun charges.

The federal government continued to investigate Mason for the Byrne killing. On December 11, 1989, Mason was convicted on federal charges including the murder of Officer Byrne. After four years of legal wrangling, including questions of Mason's mental competency, he was given a life sentence in 1994. Mason began serving his life sentence at ADX Florence supermax facility, in Florence, Colorado and was subsequently transferred around 2015 to USP Allenwood.

In 1990, Mason's mother, Claudia Mason, was sentenced to 10 years in prison for drug trafficking after she continued to run his crack business while he was in prison. She was released on 27 March 1998. Her BOP Register Number was 24652-053.

== In popular culture ==
Music

Rapper Cormega references Mason in the song "Therapy": "I rep NYC with no kingly aspiration, my feet stand on pavement once felt by Pappy Mason".

Nas mentions Mason in several albums, including:

- His debut album Illmatic (1994). In the single "The World Is Yours", Nas rhymes: "The mind activation, react like I'm facing time like Pappy Mason with pens I'm embracing."
- In his album God's Son (2002). In the single "Get Down", Nas rhymes: "New York streets where killers'll walk like Pistol Pete And 'Pappy' Mason, gave the young boys admiration."
- In his album Street's Disciple (2004), in the single, "Just A Moment".

50 Cent brings up Mason in multiple songs:

- Mason, as well as Kenneth "Supreme" McGriff, are referenced directly in 50 Cent's "Ghetto Qu'ran (Forgive Me)", which leaked in 2000 from his unreleased Columbia Records debut album Power of the Dollar, in the lyric: "I used to idolize Cat (Lorenzo "Fat Cat" Nichols), hurt me in my heart to hear that nigga snitched on Pap (Howard "Pappy" Mason), how he go out like that?"
- "Many Men (Wish Death)" from the album Get Rich or Die Tryin' (2003).
- "I Don't Need 'Em", from The Massacre (2005).

Mason is referenced in Jay-Z & R. Kelly's Best of Both Worlds Album, on track 1: " The combination of Pappy Mason and Larry Davis, Martin and Malcolm this is bigger than the Album."

He is mentioned in a single "Bomba" (translated in English as "Bomb") by the Serbian rapper Struka, who rhymes: "If hip-hop was horror movie I would be Jason, legend in hood like in Queens Pappy Mason" (translated to English from the original: "...Da je hip hop horor film ja bih bio Džejson, Legenda u kraju k'o u Kvinsu Pepi Mejson").

He is mentioned by Booba, a French rapper living in Miami, in the song "Call of bitume" featuring Rim-K, another French rapper. "RG (French private espionage agency) are stalking me anywhere I am from Miami to Corbeil-Essonnes, no more surprised, I'm determinated like Pappy Mason".

On October 19, 2012, XV released his anticipated mixtape Squarians Vol. 1. On the song "A Situation", Mason is also mentioned: "I'm in the lane with a dime that I'm penetrating, and her cat is real fat, yeah, Pappy Mason."

He is referenced by Kendrick Lamar in his 2013 BET Cypher verse.

Television

In the Luke Cage episode "Manifest", Shades mentions that Mason and former Mayor David Dinkins were acquaintances of "Momma" Mabel Stokes.

Books

He is mentioned in chapter 15 of the novel Bleeding Edge by Thomas Pynchon.
