= Ethan Brown (journalist) =

American journalist

- Occupations: Investigative journalist, author
- Writing career
- Notable works: Queens Reigns Supreme (2005), Snitch (2007), Shake the Devil Off (2009), Murder in the Bayou (2016)

Ethan Brown is an American investigative journalist and author. He is best known for his books Queens Reigns Supreme and Shake The Devil Off: A True Story of the Murder that Rocked New Orleans, the latter a Washington Post "Critics Pick" and New York Times Book Review "Editor’s Choice." Brown's work has been praised by David Simon, Chuck Klosterman, George Pelecanos, and Evan Wright.

== Biography ==
Ethan Brown was born on June 7, 1972.

Before writing his books, Brown was a writer for magazines such as New York Magazine, the New York Observer, and Rolling Stone. He has written several prominent stories about the rise of new designer drugs and the intersection between drugs, gangs, and law enforcement that he has been able to obtain through investigative journalism. His work includes a cover story on Ecstasy for New York Magazine.

== Books ==
=== Queens Reigns Supreme: Fat Cat, 50 Cent, and the Rise of the Hip Hop Hustler ===
Brown's first book, published in 2005, traced the connection between infamous drug dealers Lorenzo "Fat Cat" Nichols and Kenneth "Supreme" McGriff, and rappers Irv Gotti, Ja Rule, and 50 Cent.

Based on extensive interviews and police wiretaps, Brown's investigation uncovered the connection between "hip hop hustlers" and actual street hustling.

The dangerous connections and unflattering details exposed by Brown led journalist Chuck Klosterman to remark: "If somebody doesn't get shot because of this book, I will be fucking amazed."

The book additionally goes into depth about the extreme tension that existed at the time between law enforcement and drug kingpins such as Fat Cat. This book marks several murders between both sides that added to the increasing chaos of Southeast Queens at that time.

=== Snitch: Informants, Cooperators, and the Corruption of Justice ===
Brown's second book, published in 2007, looked at the complicated and often conflicting relationship between law enforcement and paid and unpaid informants.

Snitch was subsequently banned from all US federal prisons.

The book was named to The Root's list of "smartest, strongest writing about race."

=== Shake the Devil Off: A True Story of the Murder that Rocked New Orleans ===
Brown's third book, published in 2009, involved Brown's moving to New Orleans to investigate the story of a murder-suicide committed by Zackery Bowen, an Iraq War-veteran.

Bowen's murder of his bartender girlfriend Adriane "Addie" Hall in October 2006 post-Hurricane Katrina became a national story amidst speculation of cannibalism and Bowen's dramatic suicide off the roof of the Omni Hotel in the French Quarter.

The book was critically well received and reviewed by such outlets as The New York Times Book Review, The Washington Post, The Dallas Morning News, and the New Orleans Times-Picayune.

=== Murder in the Bayou: Who Killed the Women Known as the Jeff Davis 8? ===
Brown's fourth book, published in 2016, is an expansion of Brown's nearly 8,000 word investigative-reporting driven feature story published in Medium.com, titled “Who Killed the Jeff Davis 8?” (January 2014), which resulted from Brown's two-year investigation of the unsolved homicides of eight female prostitutes in Southwest Louisiana.

Although the case, known as the “Jeff Davis 8”, received nationwide attention in such outlets as The New York Times and CNN, Brown formulated a new theory of the case: that it was not the work of a serial killer. He backed up this theory by citing copious evidence from homicide files, witness interviews, and autopsy reports.

Murder in the Bayou has been highly praised by John Berendt, Harold Schechter, and Janet Reitman.
