= Baisley Pond Park =

Public park in Queens, New York

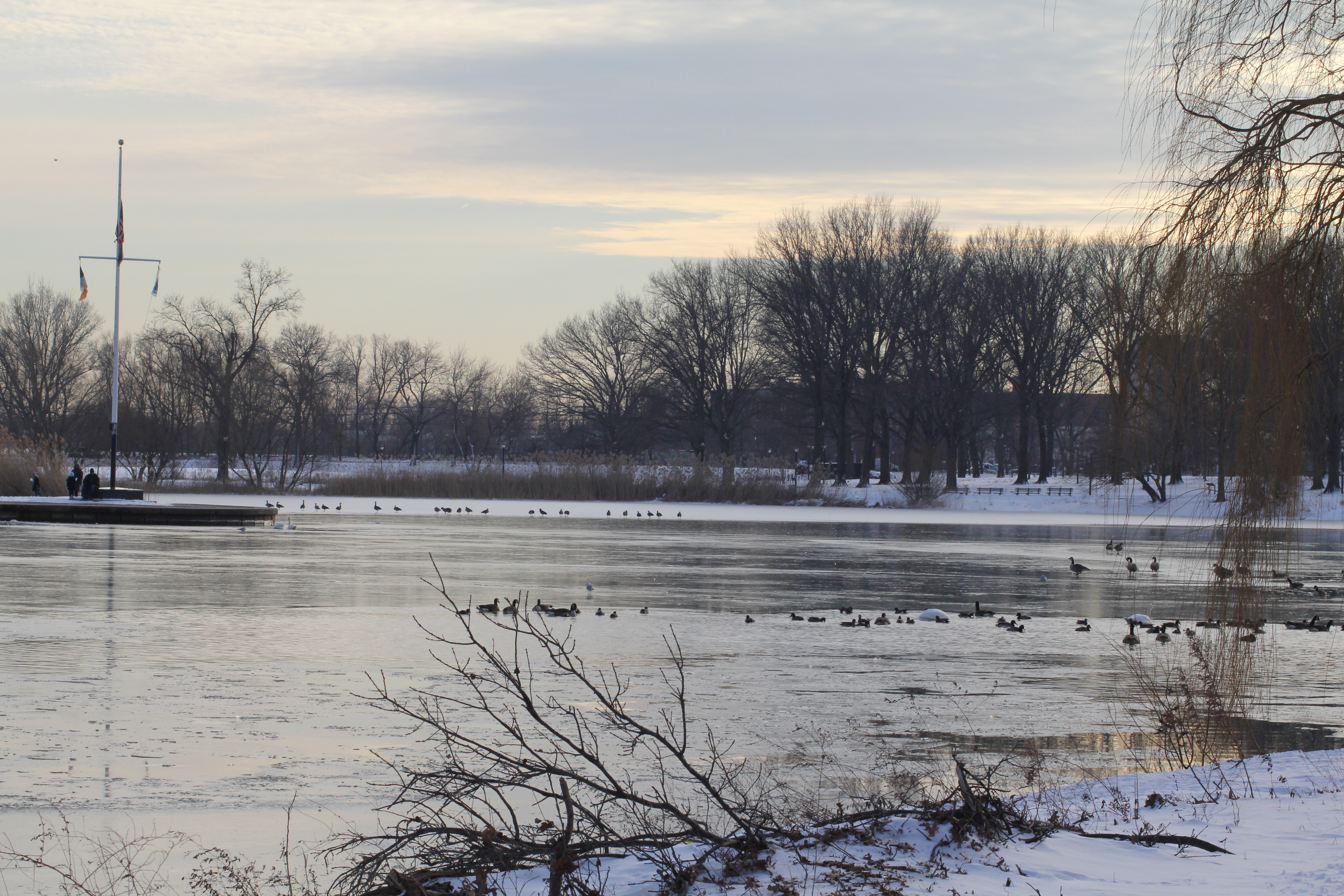
- View across Baisley Pond
- Interactive map of Baisley Pond Park
- Type: Public park
- Location: Queens, New York City, NY, United States
- Coordinates: 40°40′40″N 73°47′5″W
- Area: 109.61 acres (44.36 ha)
- Created: 1919
- Operator: NYC Parks
- Status: Open all year

Baisley Pond Park is a public park located in the southeastern part of Queens, New York City, bordering the neighborhoods of South Jamaica, Rochdale, and St. Albans. It covers 109.61 acres (44.36 ha), including the 30-acre (12 ha) Baisley Pond in the center of the park. It is maintained by the New York City Department of Parks and Recreation.

== Description ==
The park is a popular place for sports and other forms of outdoor recreation. Facilities include barbecuing areas, baseball fields, basketball courts, bicycle paths, cricket fields, fitness equipment, a football field, handball courts, five children's playgrounds, a running track, a soccer field, spray showers, and tennis courts. Several parts of the park have free Wi-Fi. The Sutphin Playground is notable for its sculpture of an American mastodon, an extinct elephant-like animal, recalling a time in the 1850s when workers dredging the pond found the bones of an individual mastodon that lived in the area almost 10,000 years ago, just after the end of the last ice age. The Mother Carter Garden, which is surrounded by an ornamental fence and has seating with views of the pond, memorializes Laura "Mother" Carter (1914–1999), a beloved community leader. Several events take place in the park, most notably the annual Southern Queens Gospel Festival, the eighth of which took place in July 2013.

New York Road Runners hosts a weekly 3.10-mile Open Run.

=== Pond ===
The pond is a natural waterway located in the center of the park's three discontinuous tracts. The northern part of the pond was fed by Beaver Brook and Jamaica Creek, which in turn were respectively derived from Beaver Pond and One-Mile Pond. The park's northernmost tract dips slightly, a remnant of the two streams that converged there. Additionally, Riders Creek entered the pond from the eastern side. To the south, the pond enters Cornell Creek, which flows into Jamaica Bay. The construction of John F. Kennedy International Airport and the JFK Expressway made the creek subterranean, depressed underground and diverted southeast. A bridge and a boathouse were both proposed for the pond, but never built.

The pond itself hosts diverse fauna and flora. It is known for its lily pads which shelter American bullfrogs. The Parks Department lists three turtle species (the invasive red-eared slider, as well as the native common snapping turtle, and musk turtle). Fish species include several of interest to anglers, including largemouth bass, black crappie, bluegill, pumpkinseed, brown bullhead, and common carp. Many species of water birds favor the pond. Summer species include great egret, snowy egret, great blue heron, and double-crested cormorant. In winter the waterfowl population is especially large and diverse, with several species that are less common in the area, such as American wigeon, redhead duck, and grebes mixing with more common species like mallard, Canada goose and invasive mute swan.

== History ==
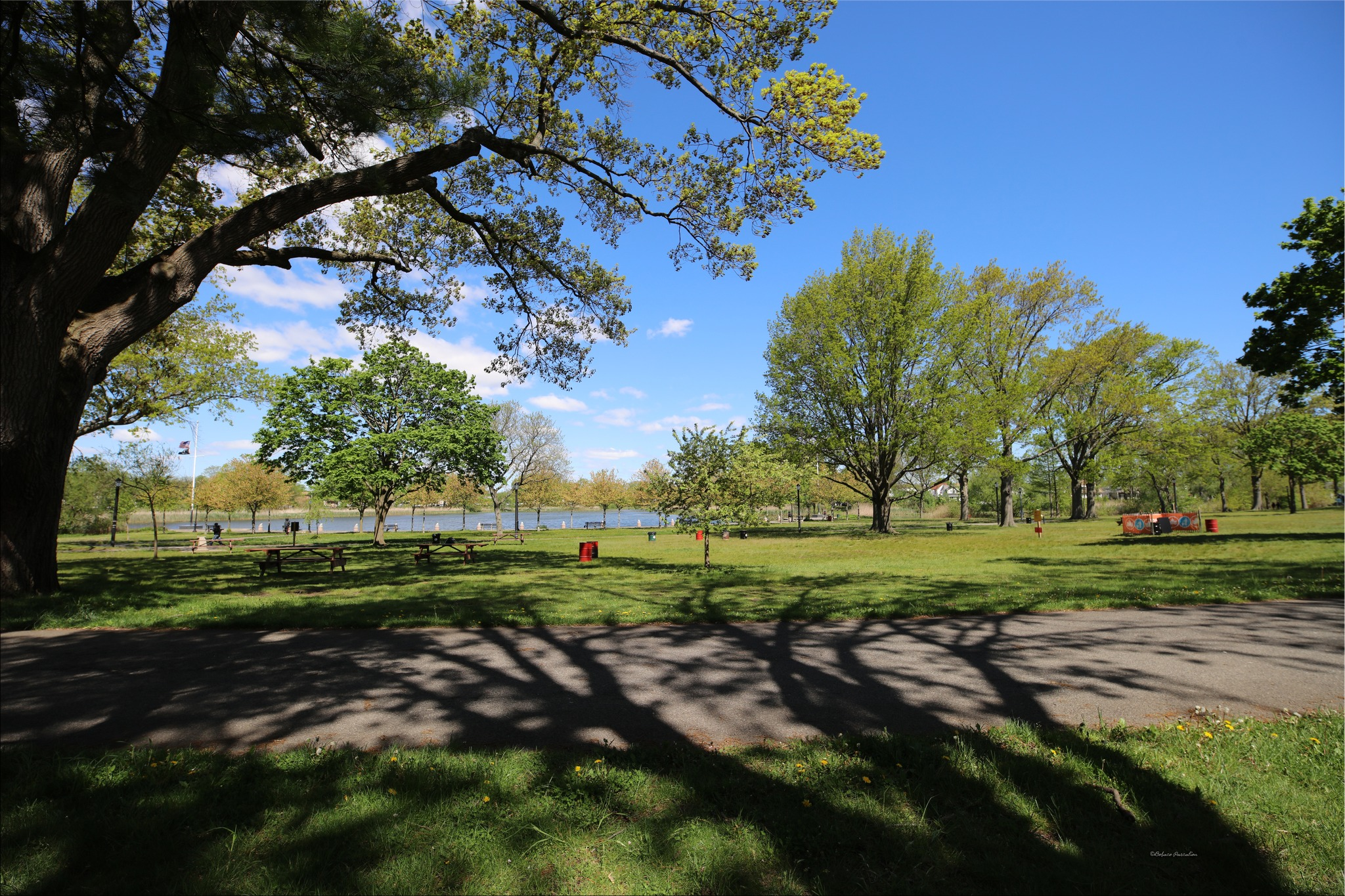
Baisley Pond Park with the pond in background

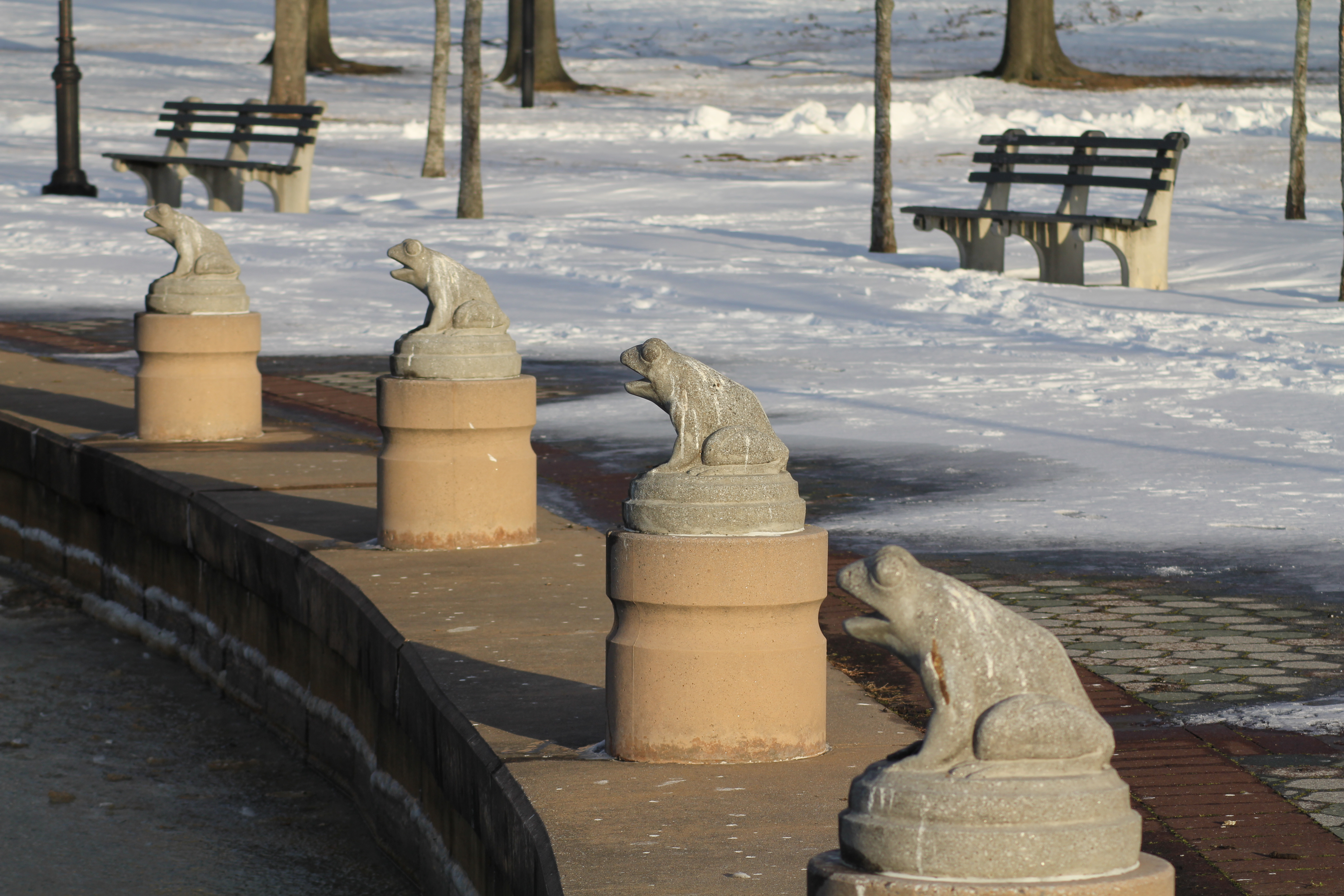
A row of stone frog statues graces the southeastern shore of Baisley Pond.

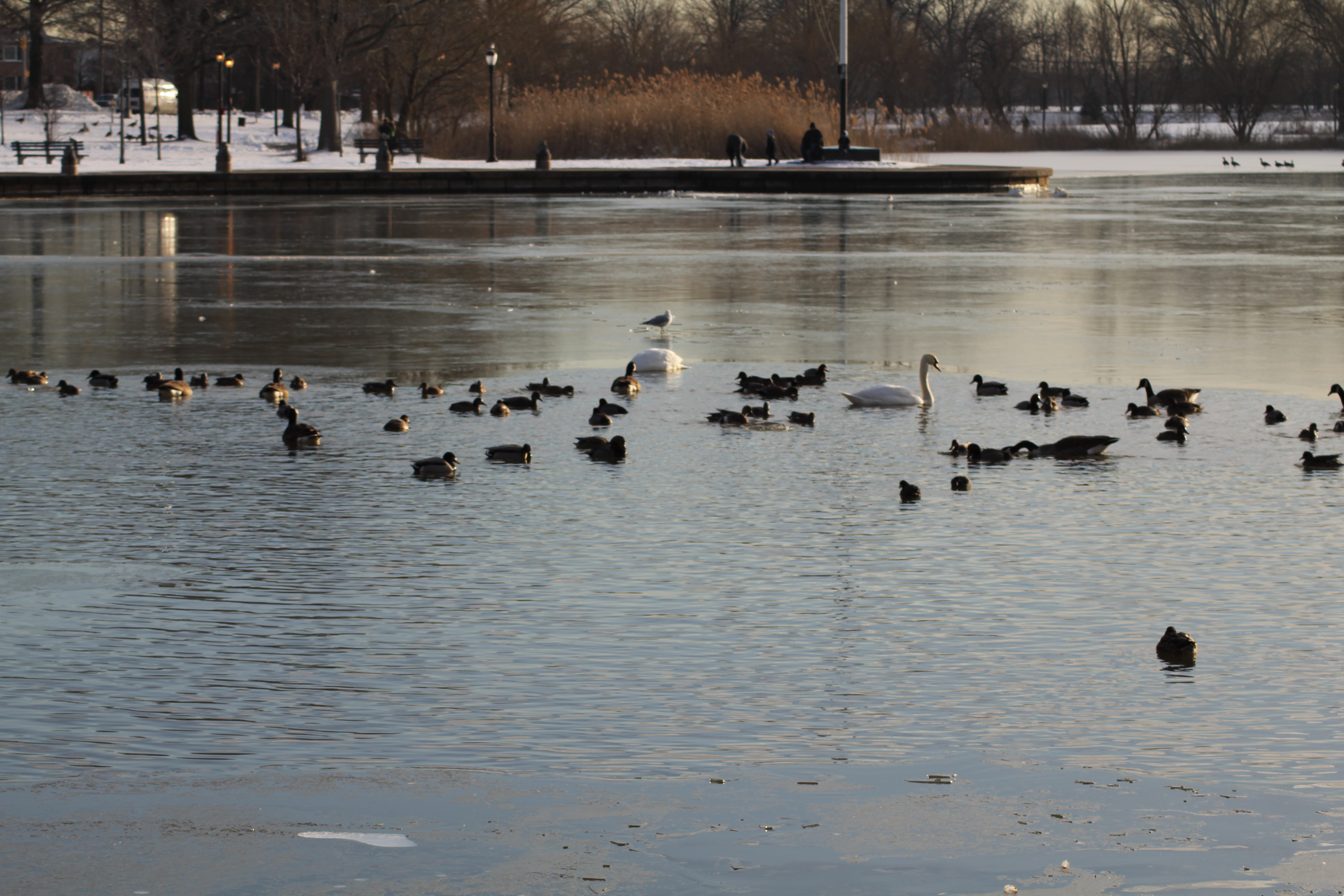
Baisley Pond hosts a large and diverse population of waterfowl in winter.

Baisley Pond is located in the Jamaica Bay watershed of western Long Island, where the intersection of 130th Avenue and 150th Street would be. It was formed in the 18th century, when local farmers dammed three streams to power a grain mill. It was named for David Baisley, a farmer who owned the mill in the early 19th century.

In 1852, the burgeoning City of Brooklyn acquired the pond from Baisley for its new water system. On April 6, 1858, while draining the lake for use as a reservoir, the remains of an American mastodon (similar to a mammoth) were discovered at the bottom of the pond. The remains included bones and teeth. By that year, water from the pond was being transported through the Ridgewood Aqueduct (or "conduit") and then pumped uphill to the Ridgewood Reservoir, from which it was distributed to Brooklyn neighborhoods. As the city grew this water system was expanded to include additional bodies of water in what are today Queens and Nassau counties. Eventually farmers in this area complained that the local water table was being depleted. In 1898, after Brooklyn became a borough of the City of New York, the pond was connected to New York's larger and more reliable upstate water system, and the old Brooklyn system, including Baisley Pond, was no longer used as a water source.

New York City transferred the northern section of the park, including the pond, to the Parks Department in 1914 and opened it to the public in 1919. At this time the surrounding area was still rural. However, it developed rapidly in the 1920s with the building of new houses and streets. In the 1930s, during the Great Depression, the Parks Department under Robert Moses built additional recreational facilities with the help of the Works Progress Administration, including a boat landing, playgrounds, tennis courts, and baseball fields. The "Southern Extension" of the park, located south of Rockaway Boulevard, remained undeveloped and neglected until 1984, when new sports facilities were built.
