= Supreme Team (gang) =

New York City organized crime syndicate

- Founded: 1981
- Founded by: Kenneth "Supreme" McGriff
- Founding location: Jamaica, Queens, New York City
- Years active: 1981–2001
- Territory: New York City
- Ethnicity: African American and Latino
- Membership (est.): 150–200
- Criminal activities: Drug trafficking, armed robbery, murder, money laundering
- Allies: Lorenzo Nichols gang, Crips, Black Disciples
- Rivals: South Brooklyn Boys

The Supreme Team was an organized crime syndicate that operated throughout the 1980s in New York City. Their headquarters was the Baisley Park Projects, in South Jamaica, Queens, New York City, New York. The leaders were Kenneth "Supreme" McGriff and his nephew, Gerald "Prince" Miller. In 1989, McGriff began serving a 10 year sentence in federal prison for a narcotics conviction.

In February 2007, McGriff was convicted in federal court of racketeering, two murder-for-hire homicides, narcotics trafficking, and engaging in illegal financial transactions with drug money. Although facing the death penalty for this conviction, he was ultimately sentenced to life in prison without the possibility of parole.

== Federal case against the Supreme Team ==
On August 16, 1996, in a case against members of the "Supreme Team" their operation and a number of alleged crimes were documented in the case file.

== Gang structure and operations ==
The Supreme Team was a street gang organized in the early 1980s in the vicinity of the Baisley Park Houses in Jamaica, Queens, New York, by a group of teenagers who were members of the Five-Percent Nation. Under the leadership of Kenneth "Supreme" McGriff, with Miller, his nephew, as second-in-command, the gang concentrated its criminal efforts on the widespread distribution of crack cocaine. At its 1987 peak, the Supreme Team's receipts exceeded $200,000 a day, and the gang regularly committed acts of violence and murder to maintain its stranglehold on the area's drug trade. After McGriff went to jail in 1987, leadership of the Supreme Team was assumed by Gerald "Prince" Miller. Miller solidified his control by increasing the security force and employing it against rivals and against Team members suspected of disloyalty. During 1987 alone, Miller and the then-incarcerated McGriff ordered at least eight homicides.

The Supreme Team's narcotics operations used dozens of employees, including layers of drug sellers to insulate the gang leaders from the street-level activity. Team members communicated using the Five Percenter Supreme Alphabet and Supreme Mathematics as a coded language and numerical systems. To thwart law enforcement efforts further, Miller used armed bodyguards and deployed sentinels with two-way radios on rooftops. The sophistication of the gang's operation enabled it to survive the periodic targeting of various members for prosecution by the New York City Police Department (NYPD) and the Queens County District Attorney's Office (collectively, the "State").

In late 1987, however, while Miller was incarcerated on state charges, a task force of NYPD and Federal Bureau of Investigation (FBI) agents executed search warrants on a number of Supreme Team storage locations, drug outlets, and residences. Although the gang was tipped off about the raid shortly before it occurred and was able to remove 11 kilograms of cocaine and $200,000 from targeted premises, authorities nonetheless seized an array of weapons, narcotics trade hardware, photographs, documents, and instructional manuals on criminal conduct, as well as a kilogram of cocaine and thousands of dollars. Following that raid and his own arrest by federal agents, McGriff ordered that the gang's operations be shut down.

When Miller was released from prison in the spring of 1989, he began to rebuild the Supreme Team and regained control of two of its most lucrative retail locations known as "spots." The reorganized gang under Miller included Arroyo as the second-in-command, Hunt as Miller's bodyguard, Ernesto Piniella as head of security, and Hale, Jimenez, and Julio Hernandez as security workers. Tucker and Coleman managed retail spots and supervised crews of workers; long-time gang member David Robinson helped supervise the drug operations and kept records. Raymond Robinson assisted in arranging cocaine purchases, provided security during drug transactions, supervised the processing of cocaine into crack, and delivered crack to sales locations. The Supreme Team began to reclaim its hold on the area drug trade and built its gross receipts up to $10,000 a day.

The substantive narcotics distribution charges against the present defendants focused on the period from December 1989 to March 1990, during which the State was monitoring the gang's activity with wiretaps. During that period, the Supreme Team conducted its business in the Baisley Park apartment of David Robinson's mother. Tucker, Coleman, and David Robinson would deliver to the apartment the money received at the retail spots they supervised; Miller and the Team's primary drug courier Trent Morris would negotiate cocaine deals by telephone with William Graham, a supplier who had Colombian connections; and Morris and Raymond Robinson would then drive to Graham's apartment with money to purchase kilogram-quantities of cocaine. The cocaine would be brought back to the Robinson apartment, where it was processed as crack, packaged, and given to Arroyo, David Robinson, Tucker, or Coleman, who in turn arranged for its sale by street-level employees.

The gang also resumed its use of violence and homicide. The government presented evidence at trial, not all of which resulted in convictions, of homicides committed both prior to the Supreme Team's 1987 shut-down and after its 1989 renaissance.

=== The Bolden and Page murders ===
In 1987, the Supreme Team was allied with another drug gang, led by Lorenzo "Fat Cat" Nichols, who supplied the Supreme Team with powder cocaine. Nichols suspected two men, Henry and Isaac Bolden, of robbing Nichols's organization. While Nichols was incarcerated, he sought Miller's assistance in locating the Boldens so that Nichols's crew members could kill them.

To obtain that information, Miller sought the help of two corrupt New York State Parole Division employees, Parole Officer Ina McGriff (no relation to Kenneth McGriff) and secretary Ronnie Younger. Ina McGriff was responsible for supervising the parole of Supreme Team security chief Ernesto Piniella but had become romantically involved with him; Younger had become romantically involved with Miller. The Team regularly paid both women for assistance. For example, McGriff falsely certified that Piniella was in compliance with parole requirements; she and Younger provided the gang leaders with information from their parole files, false identification documents, and information about the whereabouts of other parolees; and McGriff, who as a Parole Officer carried a gun, supplied Supreme Team members with ammunition.

Piniella and Ina McGriff testified that Miller paid the two women $3,000 for the addresses for the two Boldens and their families. Handwritten notes of such addresses were recovered in a raid of a Supreme Team apartment; the notes were written in part by Younger, according to a handwriting expert's testimony, and in part by Ina McGriff, according to her own testimony. The notes provided Henry Bolden's address in the Bronx, where he was later shot; and they provided Isaac Bolden's mother's address, in the immediate vicinity of which he was later shot and killed.

In 1987, Ina McGriff also gave Piniella copies of Parole Division documents indicating that Supreme Team member James Page was cooperating with authorities. Upon receiving that information, Kenneth McGriff, who had just been arrested on federal charges, ordered that Page be killed; Piniella subsequently arranged Page's murder.

Gus Rivera was a Supreme Team member who had introduced the gang's leaders to some of its Colombian suppliers. According to the trial testimony, four of these Colombian drug traffickers were robbed of their cocaine and brutally murdered in July 1989 by Miller, Arroyo, Hale, Hunt, and Jimenez. However, other than the testimony that two of these men were known as "Fernando" and "George," the government was unable to present evidence as to their identities, and their bodies were never identified. The jury found that these murders, alleged as RICO predicate acts, were not proven beyond a reasonable doubt.

In the wake of these murders, the gang decided that Rivera was more of a liability than an asset. Accordingly, in August 1989, Arroyo arranged for Rivera to be killed. Rivera was shot in the head in a Baisley Park courtyard, but he survived and hid from the gang, temporarily. Arroyo learned Rivera's whereabouts from Rivera's girlfriend, Toni McGee (also a Supreme Team member) by threatening to kill her. Arroyo and Hale proceeded to track Rivera to a South Jamaica motel, where Rivera was murdered.

=== The Suarez-Perlaza murders ===
Fernando Suarez and Pablo Perlaza were also Colombian suppliers to the Supreme Team. In the summer of 1989, the Team decided to steal these suppliers' cocaine rather than buy it. Accordingly, in August 1989 when Suarez and Perlaza arrived at Hale's Baisley Park apartment, they were held at gunpoint by Julio Hernandez and Jose "Shorty" Goncalves from New Jersey, while Arroyo and Hale bound them with tape. Supreme Team members then tied the suppliers' heads in plastic bags. While Suarez and Perlaza were suffocating, Hale beat their heads with a baseball bat. Hunt was then called upon to help dispose of the bodies. After he arrived, the bodies were loaded into a car and dumped in separate locations in Queens. Later, knowing that her husband had gone to meet Arroyo before disappearing, Suarez's wife telephoned Arroyo, who told her that Suarez was supposed to have met him but never arrived.

== In media ==
Supreme Team, a three-part documentary series about Kenneth "Supreme" McGriff and the Supreme Team, directed by Nas and Peter Scalettar, premiered in 2022 at the Tribeca Film Festival and on Showtime.
