= South Jamaica Houses =

Public housing development in Queens, New York

- NYCHA property
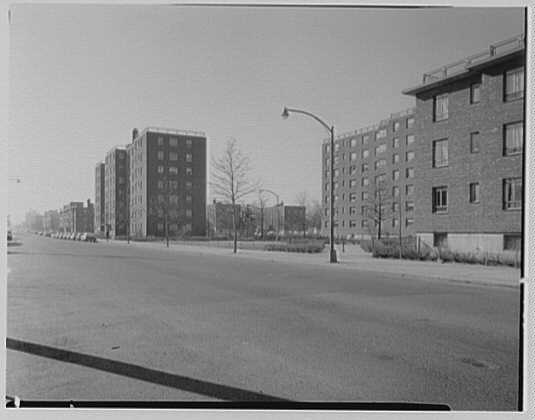
- South Jamaica Houses in 1961
- Location within New York City
- Coordinates: 40.6977°N 73.7960°W
- Country: United States
- State: New York
- City: New York City
- Borough: Queens
- ZIP codes: 11433
- Area codes: 718, 347, 929, and 917

South Jamaica Houses is a housing project in South Jamaica, Queens, New York. It is nicknamed "40 Projects." The original complex, South Jamaica I Houses opened in 1940, while the second complex, South Jamaica II Houses, opened in 1954. The entire complex is bounded by South Road to the north, 160th Street to the east, Brinkerhoff Avenue to the south, and 158th Street to the west.

== Nicknames ==
The South Jamaica Houses are commonly referred to as 40 Projects. The nicknames are said to be derived from the complex's opening in the year 1940, or the nearby P.S. 40 .

== Location ==
South Jamaica I is the original section of the complex opened in 1940. Measuring 9.02 acres (3.65 ha), it lies between South Road and 109th Avenue. It consists of 11 three-to-four story buildings with 440 units (originally 448). South Jamaica II lies between 109th Avenue and Brinkerhoff Avenue, occupying 13.3 acres (5.4 ha). It consists of 16 buildings three-to-seven stories high. The buildings in both sections have brick exteriors. A small parking lot is located at the northwest end of the complex.

Located at 159th Street and 108th Avenue on the east side of the development is the Jamaica Day Nursery. The nursery, which predates the projects, was moved into the complex in 1940. One block south is the South Jamaica Community Center, also known as the Samuel Huntington Community Center. The complex also includes several playgrounds and gardens.

Adjacent to the west of complex lies the Atlantic Branch of the Long Island Rail Road, which does not stop in this area. To the north across from South Road is the campus of York College.

== History ==
Prior to the construction of the project, South Jamaica was considered a slum and severely overcrowded. The site of the South Jamaica Houses was occupied by 150 wood-frame houses. It was estimated that 3,000 families in the neighborhood needed improved housing conditions. On August 16, 1939, New York City Mayor Fiorello H. La Guardia announced plans to allocate $20 million towards five planned public housing projects, including the South Jamaica Houses, and the two-part Vladeck Houses on the Lower East Side of Manhattan. The South Jamaica development itself would cost $2.5 million. These were some of the first housing developments to be built and operated by the New York City Housing Authority (NYCHA). The land was acquired at low cost, and the development was designed to feature low-rise buildings. Though located in a predominantly African American neighborhood, the houses were the first NYCHA facility to be racially integrated with both White and Black families.

Construction began on September 28, 1939. The complex was dedicated by Mayor LaGuardia on April 15, 1940. The development opened on July 2, 1940, accepting 351 families. An additional 96 families moved in on August 5. The Jamaica Day Nursery, formerly located on 107th Avenue and 159th Street, was moved into a new headquarters within the complex on September 9. The complex generated controversy over the alleged selection of tenants by race, and because many applicants from Manhattan, Brooklyn and The Bronx were selected over local South Jamaica residents.

Plans to extend the complex emerged in the mid-to-late 1940s. On January 6, 1951, the Housing Authority announced plans to condemn additional slum land to build South Jamaica II Houses, extending the complex south to Brinkerhoff Avenue. Plans for the project were filed on August 23, 1951, estimated to cost $7.5 million. Residential occupation began in May 1954, and the development was completed by October of that year.

In the 1980s and 1990s, during the national crack cocaine epidemic, the South Jamaica Houses were considered a hotbed for drug-related activity and violence. This included the operations of the Corley gang and the Supreme Team. This has continued into the 21st century, in spite of major drug raids by the New York City Police Department in 1999 and 2012.

== Schools ==
Three elementary schools are located near the complex:

- Samuel Huntington School (P.S. 40), on 109th Avenue and Union Hall Street, near the southeast end of the complex.
- William Wordsworth School (P.S. 48), on 155th Street and 108th Avenue, two blocks west of the complex.
- Walter Francis Bishop School (P.S. 160), to the west of the complex on Inwood Street off of Sutphin Boulevard.

The nearest middle and junior high schools are:

- Junior High School 40, adjacent to P.S. 40. The nickname of the housing project is said to be derived from the school's name.
- Richard Grossley Junior High School (JHS 8), just off of Merrick Boulevard.
- Eagle Academy for Young Men III, a middle and high school located at Merrick and Linden Boulevards.

The closest high school to the South Jamaica Houses is the Queens High School for the Sciences, a specialized high school, located on the York College campus. Eagle Academy for Young Men III and the High School for Law Enforcement and Public Safety are located south of Linden Boulevard. The closest zoned high school is Hillcrest High School just north of Hillside Avenue in Jamaica, while the closest educational campus is the Jamaica Campus (formerly Jamaica High School) near the Grand Central Parkway. The Young Women's Leadership School of Queens was formerly located in the P.S. 40 facility, but is now located across from Hillcrest High School.

== Notable residents ==
- Gerald A. Lawson, engineer who worked on the Fairchild Channel F video game console
- Milford Graves, jazz drummer and percussionist
- Organized Konfusion, hip-hop group

== See also ==
- New York City Housing Authority
- List of New York City Housing Authority properties
