= Baisley Park Houses =

Public housing development in Queens, New York

- NYCHA property
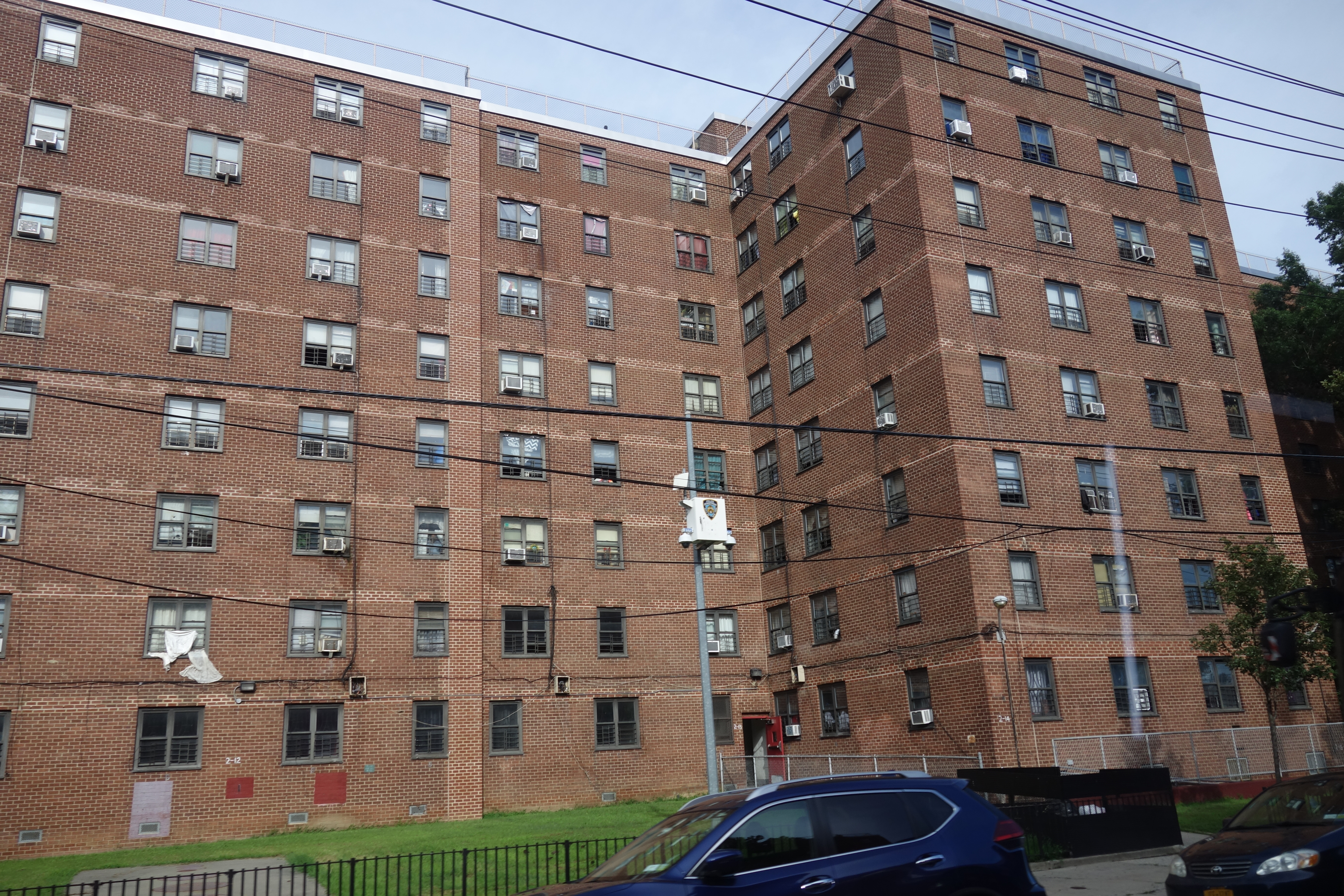
- Interactive map of Baisley Park Houses
- Coordinates: 40.6849°N 73.7823°W
- Country: United States
- State: New York
- City: New York City
- Borough: Queens
- ZIP codes: 11434
- Area codes: 718, 347, 929, and 917

Baisley Park Houses is a housing project in South Jamaica, Queens, New York, completed on April 30, 1961. The development consists of five, 8-story buildings with 386 apartment units for an estimated 1,057 people. It covers a 7.48-acre expanse, and is bordered by the Long Island Rail Road, 116th Avenue, Foch and Guy Brewer Boulevards. It is owned and managed by New York City Housing Authority (NYCHA).

== Notable residents ==
- Kenneth "Supreme" McGriff (born 1960), of gang The Supreme Team
- Nicki Minaj
- James Carter (basketball)

== See also ==
- New York City Housing Authority
- List of New York City Housing Authority properties
