= Jeff Davis 8 =

String of unsolved murders in Jefferson Davis, Louisiana

Locations
1 Jennings, Jefferson Davis County, Louisiana

The Jeff Davis 8, sometimes called the Jennings 8 or Jennings 8 girls, refers to a series of unsolved murders in Jefferson Davis Parish, Louisiana. Between 2005 and 2009, the bodies of eight women were found in swamps and canals surrounding Jennings, Louisiana. Most of the bodies were found in a state of decomposition, making the cause of death difficult to determine.

Critics, including author Ethan Brown, who wrote a 2016 book concerning the case, alleged that the investigations into the murders were severely mishandled by the authorities.

== Murders ==
=== Victims ===
The first victim, Loretta Lewis, 28, was found floating in a river by a fisherman on May 20, 2005. Other victims were Ernestine Marie Daniels Patterson, 30; Kristen Gary Lopez, 21; Whitnei Dubois, 26; Laconia "Muggy" Brown, 23; Crystal Shay Benoit Zeno, 24; and Brittney Gary, 17. The final body, that of Necole Guillory, 26, was found off Interstate 10 in 2009.

=== Causes of death ===
Patterson and Brown had their throats slit; the other bodies were in too advanced state of decomposition to determine the cause of death, though asphyxia is a suspected cause of death.

=== Connections ===
Ethan Brown's book Murder in the Bayou alleged that there were close connections between the victims, suspects, and investigators. Most of the victims knew each other well. Some were related by blood (such as cousins Kristen Gary Lopez and Brittney Gary) or lived together (Gary lived with Crystal Benoit shortly before her death). The victims also shared in common traits such as poverty, mental illness, and histories of drug abuse and sex work.

The women all also served as informants for the police about the local drug trade and often provided police with information about other Jeff Davis 8 victims before their own deaths.

Kristen Lopez, one of the victims, was present when police shot and killed a drug dealer named Leonard Crochet in 2005 along with several individuals connected to the Jeff Davis 8 case, including Alvin "Bootsy" Lewis, who fathered a child with victim Whitnei Dubois and was also the brother-in-law of the first victim, Loretta Chaisson Lewis. A grand jury investigated the shooting and determined there was no probable cause for a charge of negligent homicide against police even though a Louisiana State Police investigation into the Crochet shooting concluded that he was unarmed when he was shot to death by law enforcement. However, witnesses told investigators they believed the police had killed many of the victims because of what they knew about the shooting of Leonard Crochet.

== Investigation ==
In December 2008, a task force consisting of 14 federal, state, and local law enforcement agencies was formed to solve the killings. From the outset, the task force was searching for a serial killer. However, Ethan Brown disputes the serial killing hypothesis. Family members of the victims have alleged that the police are actually responsible for the deaths.

=== Allegations of misconduct ===
Task force investigative reports reveal a series of witness interviews in which local law enforcement were implicated in the murders. Statements from two female inmates portrayed suspects working with the sheriff's office to dispose of evidence in the Lopez case. However, the sergeant who took the statements was forced out of his job, and the allegations were ignored by law enforcement.

Sheriff's office chief criminal investigator, Warren Gary, was also accused of purchasing a truck suspected of having been used to transport a body for the purpose of discarding evidence.

In 2009, the sheriff ordered that every investigator working the Jeff Davis 8 case be swabbed for DNA in response to the accusations against investigators. However, the office refuses to comment on the results of the DNA testing.

=== Suspects ===
Police have arrested or issued warrants for the arrest of four people in connection with the case. Two people were held on murder charges for months before being released due to issues with evidence.

Frankie Richard, a local strip club owner and suspected drug dealer admitted to being a crack addict and to having sex with most of the victims. He was among those last seen with one of the victims, Kristen G. Lopez. Law enforcement's own witnesses have connected Richard to the Sheriff's Office. The two female inmates who stated the Sheriff's Office disposed of evidence in the Lopez case alleged that the evidence was discarded at the behest of Richard. He was never charged and later died on March 22, 2020, at the age of 64.

Byron Chad Jones and Lawrence Nixon (a cousin of the fifth victim, Laconia Brown) were briefly charged with second-degree murder in the Ernestine Patterson case. However, the sheriff's office did not test the alleged crime scene until 15 months after Patterson's murder, and found it "failed to demonstrate the presence of blood."

== In media ==
The murders and investigations have spawned extensive coverage in media. This includes:

- The 2010 novel The Glass Rainbow by James Lee Burke is set against the background of the murders. Burke mentioned them again in his later novel Robicheaux in 2018.
- A 2011 investigative podcast series, Behind the Yellow Tape on Blogtalkradio (Joey Ortega) spanning 12 episodes.
- A 2012 episode of the series Dark Minds, in which show host M. William Phelps visited the area and interviewed several people connected to the case.
- The 2016 book Murder in the Bayou: Who Killed the Women Known as the Jeff Davis 8? by author Ethan Brown.
- Part of the "True Crime Tuesday" series in 2018 on The Dr. Oz Show
- The 2019 two-part Investigation Discovery documentary series Death in the Bayou.
- The 2019 five-part series Murder in the Bayou on the Showtime network.
- A 2021 two-part podcast on The Casual Criminalist.

Despite speculation, the Jeff Davis 8 cases were not the inspiration for the first season of the HBO series True Detective, according to creator Nic Pizzolatto in the series’ DVD commentary.

== See also ==
- List of fugitives from justice who disappeared
- List of serial killers in the United States
