= Queens Community Board 12 =

Queens Community District 12 Queens Community Board 12
- Community District
- Country: United States
- State: New York
- City: New York City
- Borough: Queens
- Neighborhoods: list: Baisley Park; Hollis; Jamaica; Rochdale Village; St. Albans; South Jamaica; Springfield Gardens

Government
  - Type: Community board
  - Body: Queens Community Board 12
  - Chairperson: Rev. Carlene O. Thorbs
  - District Manager: Yvonne Reddick

Area
  - Total: 9.6 sq mi (25 km^{2})

Population (2016)
  - Total: 244,302
  - Density: 25,000/sq mi (9,800/km^{2})

Ethnicity
  - African-American: 61.2%
  - Asian: 12.5%
  - Hispanic and Latino Americans: 16.7%
  - White: 1.7%
  - Others: 7.7%
- Time zone: UTC−5 (Eastern)
  - Summer (DST): UTC−4 (EDT)
- ZIP codes: 11412, 11423, 11433,11434, 11435, and 11436
- Area codes: 718, 347, and 929, and 917
- Police Precincts: 103rd (website); 113th (website)
- Website: www1.nyc.gov/site/queenscb12/index.page

The Queens Community Board 12 is a local government in the New York City borough of Queens, encompassing the neighborhoods of Jamaica, Hollis, St. Albans, Springfield Gardens, Baisley Park, Rochdale Village, South Jamaica. Queens Community Board 12 is the second largest Community Board in Queens, covering the largest area of the borough. Comprising districts 28, 29 and part of 27, Queens Community Board 12’s northern boundary is Hillside Avenue; eastern boundaries are Francis Lewis Boulevard (between Hillside Avenue and Springfield Boulevard) and Springfield Boulevard (between Francis Lewis Boulevard and the Belt Parkway); southern boundary is the Belt Parkway and western boundary is the Van Wyck Expressway. Downtown Jamaica serves as one of New York City’s major regional retail, employment and transportation hubs; is home to educational, theatre/arts, governmental and civic facilities, including the U.S. Food and Drug Administration Regional Laboratory, Social Security Administration offices, Queens Family, Queens Civil Court, and Supreme Courts, York College, City University of New York, Jamaica Center for Arts and Learning and The Jamaica Performing Arts Center.

== Community Issues ==
CB12 has been working to address major flooding caused by the restoration of the Southeast Queens water table, previously suppressed by the pumping operations of the Greater Jamaica Water Company. With the closure of the water company, the raised water table has caused sewer infrastructure failures and basement flooding throughout the area. Queens Community Board 12 is also on the front lines of the city's homeless crisis with a disproportionate number in the area.
