= St. Monica's Church (Queens) =

Historic church in Queens, New York

- U.S. National Register of Historic Places
- New York City Landmark
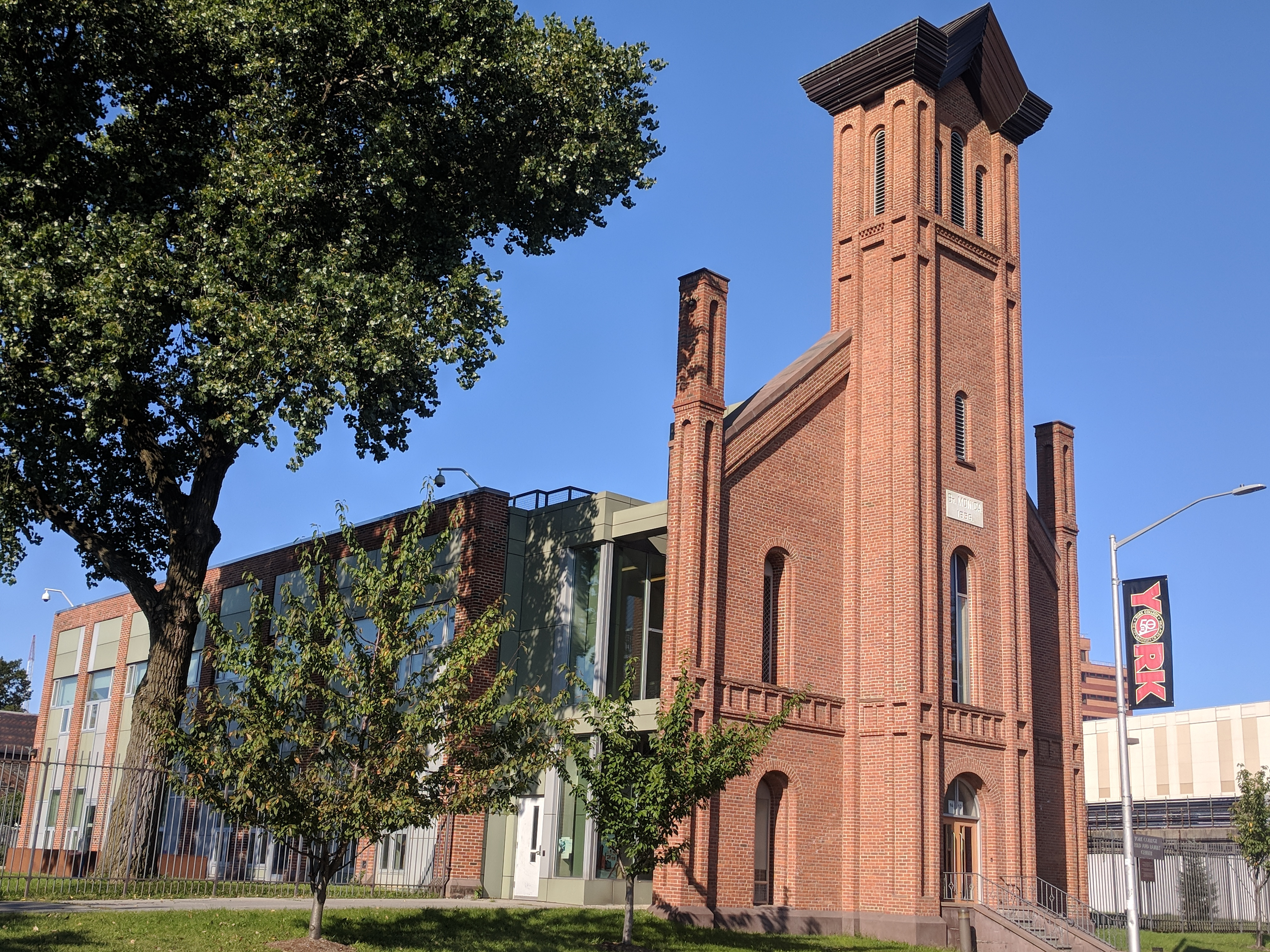
- 4-story facade in 2018
- Location: 94-20 160th Street, Jamaica, New York
- Coordinates: 40°42′7″N 73°47′53″W
- Built: 1856
- Architect: Anders Peterson, Rev. Anthony Farley
- Architectural style: Romanesque
- NRHP reference No.: 80002752
- NYCL No.: 1017

Significant dates
- Added to NRHP: April 9, 1980
- Designated NYCL: March 13, 1979

St. Monica's Church is a historic former Catholic parish church in the Diocese of Brooklyn, located in Jamaica, Queens, New York. It was built in 1856 and was a brick basilica-type building in the Romanesque style. It features a four-story entrance tower in the center of its three-bay-wide front façade.

The church was closed and abandoned in 1973, and partially collapsed in 1998. A child care center for York College opened in the mid 2000s incorporating the surviving facade of Saint Monica's Church.

== Architecture ==
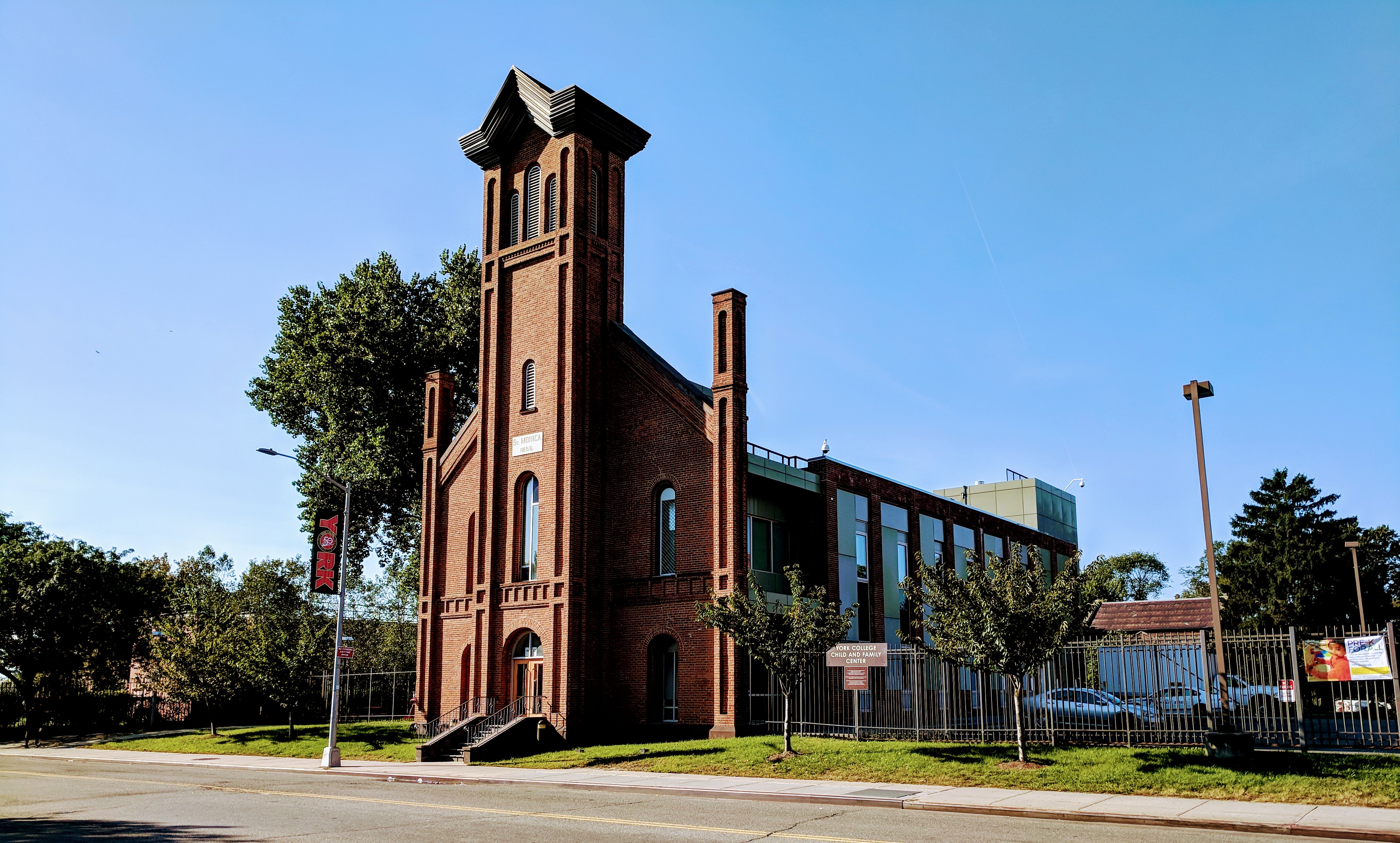
Seen from 160th Street in 2018

St. Monica's Catholic Church was constructed by master mason Anders Peterson under the direction of Reverend Anthony Farley. The Church is marked by its distinctive central campanile, which is reminiscent of the Romanesque architecture. This also made it one of the earliest surviving examples of Early Romanesque Revival architecture in New York, and one of the only Roman Catholic Churches in the city executed in this style.

The church was designed as a red brick Romanesque Revival style building with a tall central campanile and an Italian flavor. The structure was given "an impression of height beyond its actual size" by slender pilasters outlining the brick. Most of the building's modest decoration was made so by the delicate brick situated on the top of the side walls. The inside of the church is a great open hall, which has been redecorated twice in a much higher style (during 1893 and the 1930s). It was constructed with no interior columns for support; the interior was made spacious and could seat 500 people.

== History ==
=== Catholic church ===
The original St. Monica's Church building was constructed around 1840, and was slightly south of the current church.

Father Anthony Farley arrived at St. Monica's in 1854 to begin his influential term as its pastor and to help with the plans for the construction of a new church on five lots of land on Washington Street (160th Street). Four such lots near the old frame church were given to the Church by a French woman from New York and Farley purchased the fifth. The cost for this church's construction was $25,000. Farley selected Jamaica master mason Anders Peterson, a Dane who also owned a local grist mill, as the contractor. Peterson was prominently familiar with the contemporary building history of the area and was responsible for the fine masonry of the First Reformed Church (1861-1863) and that of Grace Episcopal Church (1861-1863). The cornerstone of the building was laid in 1856 and on August 15, 1857, Bishop Loughlin, the first Bishop of Brooklyn, presided over the dedication of the church.

During the 1940s, Mario M. Cuomo was an altar boy for this church.

=== Abandonment ===
St. Monica's Church was forced to close as its land was to be incorporated into the new York College. At the time it was the oldest Catholic church in Queens, and at the time 90% of its parishioners were African American. It held a final Mass of thanksgiving before it closed its doors to make way for the growing multimillion-dollar York College expansion. A final Mass was held in June 1973, and the building remained empty and slowly deteriorated afterwards.

By 1975, the church had been largely destroyed by vandalism and neglect. The church's leaded-glass windows were broken, the copper gutters were ripped off the roof, holes were chopped into the sides of the building, and all the inside pews were carried away.

Henry Ludder Jr., head of a committee within the Friends of Jamaica History, stated in 1978 that St. Monica's Church was a historic site that "not only could be preserved – it could become an important community resource. St. Monica's Church, the oldest Catholic Church on Long Island, was considered to be a fine and early example of Victorian Italianate public architecture.

According to a 1978 article, St. Monica's Church became vacant and was in a deteriorating state in the 1970s; it was marked for demolition by the city's Housing Preservation and Developing Department. However, the demolition order was "placed on hold" pending efforts by the Friends of Jamaica History and the Queens Borough President's Office to preserve the building as a historic site. Both argued that the church could be restored and repaired for public use and be protected if funded with $300,000 to $500,000.

It was listed by the New York City Landmarks Preservation Commission in 1979 and on the National Register of Historic Places in 1980.

After years of neglect, the walls and roof collapsed in 1998, following two days of torrential rainfall.

=== Renovation into daycare center ===
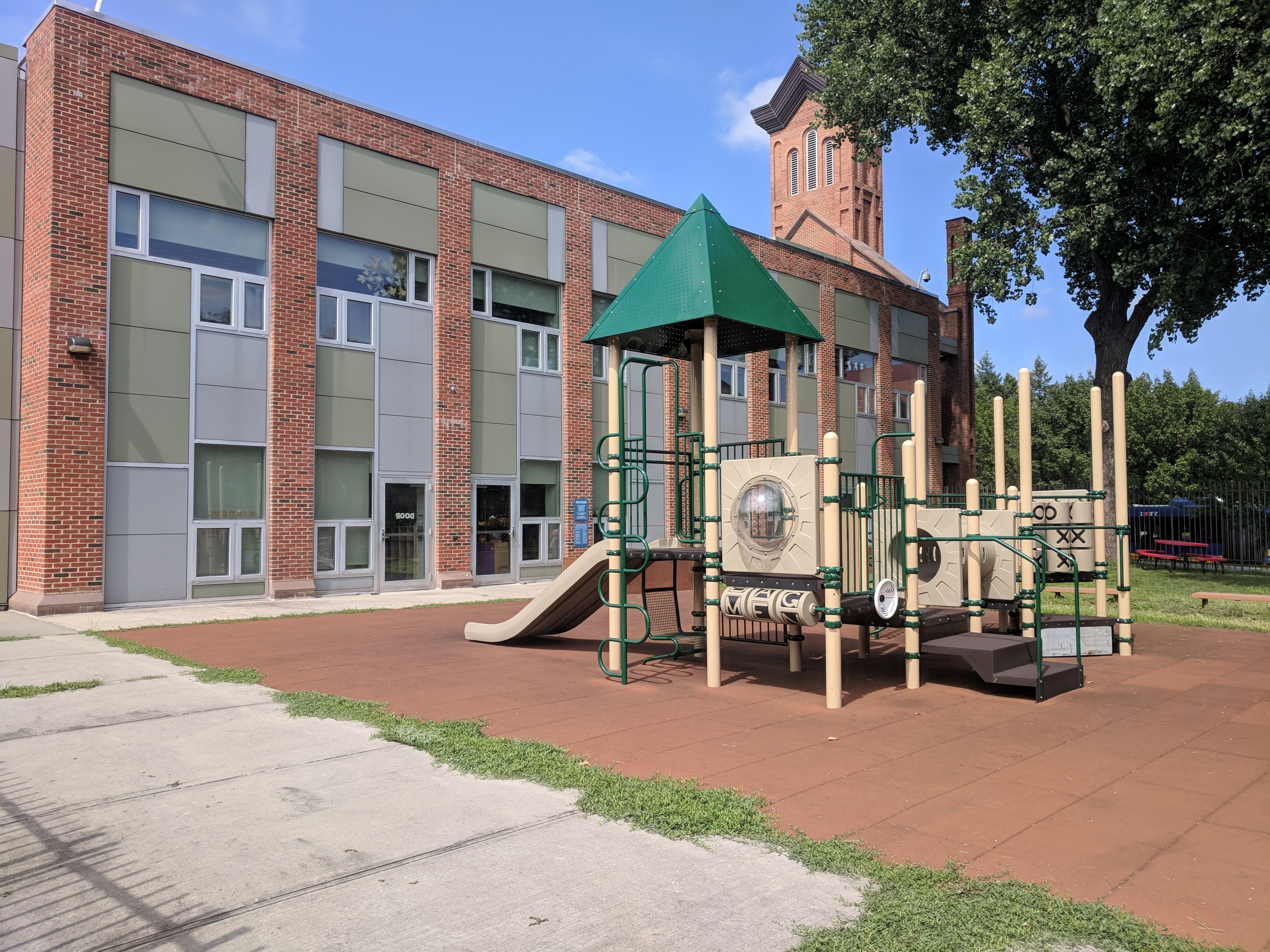
The newly constructed part of the childcare center in 2018

In December 2003, ground was broken and acquired for the York College Child Care Center, cost a state-funded $4.7 million; this project's architecture represented "a fashion of something old and something new". The front facade was saved on the recommendation of the New York City Landmarks Preservation Commission. This two-story, 10,000-square-foot (929-square-meter) steel and glass day care center incorporated the two-story brick facade and bell tower, which were all that remained of the 1856 Roman Catholic Church.

This 10,000-square-foot red brick, steel and glass building was made to accommodate up to 100 kids; the ages of the children ranged from infants under six months of age to pre-schoolers. The facility included learning spaces and eight playrooms; its hours of service then were from 8 a.m. to 10 p.m. for both day and night students.

== Cemetery ==
The parish cemetery down the street continued to operate after the church was closed, although it was completely surrounded by the college campus. It was established around 1840 and was adjacent to the original St. Monica Church building. As of 2021, it contained about 3,000 burials. It is currently operated by Catholic Cemeteries of the Diocese of Brooklyn.

== See also ==
- List of New York City Designated Landmarks in Queens
- National Register of Historic Places listings in Queens, New York
