= Beaver Pond (Queens) =

- Location within New York
- Location: Jamaica, Queens, New York
- Coordinates: 40.701051°N 73.799631°W
- Type: Former lake

Beaver Pond was a pond in Jamaica, Queens, New York. Water flowed out of the pond through Baisley Creek towards Baisley Pond. From there, it flowed through Cornell Creek into Jamaica Bay.

The stream was formed by beavers prior to human settlement. The local Lenape native word for beaver, Jameco, became the namesake of the English settlement to the north of the pond, which became known as Jamaica. Beaver Pond's namesake animal was a vital component in the colonial economy. Beaver fur attracted Dutch colonists to the region and the animal appears on the seal of New York City. English settlers arrived in the area in 1656, with permission from the New Netherlands government to build Rustdorp. Following the English takeover of the colony in 1664, the popular name Jamaica became official and the town became the seat of Queens County in 1683.

The pond's oldest neighbor is Prospect Cemetery, which accepted its first interment in 1668 and continued to perform burials until 1988.

Later, the Long Island Rail Road's Main Line and Atlantic Branch were built in Jamaica. By 1834, when the railroad was constructed, the pond was considered the town's center.

In the last decade of the 19th century, the pond was used by the American Ice Company as an ice harvesting site. City authorities considered the industrial use of Beaver Pond a health hazard as its outflow contributed to the Brooklyn Water Works. In April 1906, a grand jury in Queens recommended that the city fill in this "menace to the community and a drawback to the material progress of that section of Jamaica." Although Beaver Pond was filled, land atop the site remained undeveloped for another couple of decades. It is zoned for manufacturing with auto repair shops, slaughterhouses and undeveloped lots used to store car parts. Beaver Road, which follows the former pond's northern shore, is the only physical reminder of this body of water.
