= Lorenzo Nichols =

American convicted drug lord

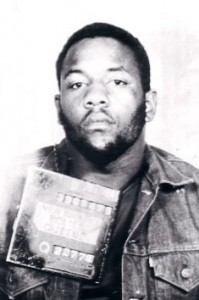
- Born: December 25, 1958 (age 67); Bessemer, Alabama, U.S.
- Other name: "Fat Cat"
- Occupation: Drug lord
- Criminal charges: RICO
- Criminal penalty: 40 years
- Criminal status: Released
- Spouse: Yammy Nichols (m. 2021)
- Children: Six

Lorenzo "Fat Cat" Nichols (born December 25, 1958) is an American convicted former drug kingpin who ran a sophisticated drug trafficking organization in the 1980s in Jamaica, Queens. Members of Nichols' crew were Howard "Pappy" Mason, a friend from prison and a key part of Nichols' operation; Luc "Spoon" Stephen, a trusted associate; and Joseph "Mike Bones" Rogers. Nichols' headquarters was Big Mac's Deli, a business that he inherited from his then father-in-law.

According to the book Queens Reigns Supreme: Fat Cat, 50 Cent, and the Rise of the Hip Hop Hustler by Ethan Brown, he got his nickname "Fat Cat" because of his "linebacker-thick neck, a head so big it nearly blocked out his friends' faces in snapshots, and his rangy beard."

== Sentencing and punishment ==
Nichols pleaded guilty to ordering two deaths. One victim was a close childhood friend. The other was 20-year-old Myrtle Horsham, his former girlfriend and mother of Nichols' son. The Horsham murder caused Nichols' mother, Louise Coleman, to disown her son. A New York Times recount of his plea allocution, which occurred in a sealed courtroom, contained the following exchange regarding the Horsham murder: "Was one of the purposes of this to teach other people in the organization a lesson about not stealing from you?," Judge Edward R. Korman of Federal District Court in Brooklyn asked Mr. Nichols. "It wasn't just the stealing," Mr. Nichols replied. "It was the fact that she was my girl and that she took my money and spent it on another person. She made me look bad in front of people who was within the organization."

In 1992, Nichols pleaded guilty to ordering the murder of his parole officer, Brian Rooney, and received a sentence of 25 years to life. He also pleaded guilty to drug charges and racketeering charges and was given an additional sentence of 40 years.

In 2010, the New York Daily News published a letter that Nichols had written to the publication from his prison cell: "I have nothing but time to ponder my misdeeds," Nichols wrote, adding, "To the victims of my criminal activities, I offer my deepest regret and sincerest apology."

In April of 2022, Nichols was granted parole from state prison. He was released from Clinton Correctional Facility and transferred into federal custody. According to the Bureau of Prisons Inmate Locator, as of 03/16/2023, Nichols is no longer in federal custody.
