= Kenneth McGriff =

American former drug lord (born 1960)

- Born: September 19, 1959 (age 67); New York City, U.S.
- Other names: Supreme; Preme; Rick Coleman; Kevin Long; John Simms; Lee Tuten
- Occupations: Gangster; drug lord
- Years active: 1981–2006
- Status: Incarcerated
- Criminal charges: Drug trafficking; murder
- Penalty: Life imprisonment

Kenneth "Supreme" McGriff (born September 19, 1959) is an American former drug lord from New York City who founded the organized crime syndicate the Supreme Team. In 2007, he was convicted of murder conspiracy and drug trafficking and sentenced to life in prison.

== Criminal career ==
McGriff rose to prominence in early 1981 when he formed his own crack cocaine distribution and manufacturing organization which he called The Supreme Team based in the Baisley Park Houses in the South Jamaica section of the Queens borough of New York City, New York. Under McGriff's leadership, the gang's numbers swelled to over one hundred members with more than $200,000 daily sold worth of crack cocaine at the 1987 peak and came to control the crack cocaine trade in Baisley Park, the neighborhood where McGriff was raised.

In 1987, McGriff was arrested following a joint state and federal investigation and in 1989 pleaded guilty to engaging in a Continuing Criminal Enterprise. He was sentenced to 12 years incarceration and convicted for federal narcotics conspiracy charges. McGriff was released from prison on parole in 1995.

After being released from prison on parole in 1995, McGriff tried cinematography, seeking help in 1995 from Irv Gotti to film a movie based on the Kenyatta series' novel Crime Partners.

He was sent back to prison on parole violations by year's end, and served another 2½ years before being released in 1997. From 1997 to 2003 McGriff's criminal organization expanded into wholesale heroin and cocaine into Maryland and North Carolina. They distributed over 30 kilograms of heroin, 150 kilograms of cocaine, and 1.5 kilograms of cocaine base. In 1998 McGriff flew to Hollywood to purchase the film rights to another Goines' book titled Black Gangster from publishing company Holloway House, he visited several times over five more years to negotiate a deal but only produced a soundtrack for the book and no movie came to existence.

In July 2001 McGriff was arrested after police pulled over a white BMW near 145th Street in Harlem and found a loaded weapon and nearly $11,000 in cash in his vehicle. Months before the investigation on Irv Gotti was launched, McGriff pleaded guilty to the gun possession in September 2002. In 2003 McGriff was jailed in Baltimore for having violated a parole violation for shooting guns at a firing range, and faced a sentencing on a state charge for criminal possession of a weapon with intent to use. He served a 37-month sentence.

McGriff is alleged to have had a hand in the 2002 murder of Run-DMC member Jam Master Jay, and was convicted of ordering the 2001 deaths of "Big Nose" Troy Singlton and rapper Eric "E-Moneybags" Smith, with the latter being in retaliation for the death of McGriff's friend Colbert "Black Just" Johnson. Federal authorities also accused him in connection with the attempted murder of 50 Cent related to retaliation for the song "Ghetto Qur'an (Forgive Me)".

Due to McGriff's reputation, the FBI soon questioned the intimacies of the affiliation with Murder Inc., culminating in a raid of the Murder Inc. offices in January 2003. McGriff faced accusations of drug trafficking while others with Murder Inc. were indicted on money laundering and conspiracy to commit money laundering charges. The trial ended in December 2005.

On February 1, 2007, McGriff was convicted of murder-for-hire at a federal court in the Eastern District of New York on charges that he paid $50,000 to have two rivals (Eric "E-Moneybags" Smith and "Big Nose" Troy Singleton) killed in 2001. The jury deliberated for five days before finding McGriff guilty of murder conspiracy and drug trafficking. On February 9, 2007, McGriff was sentenced to life in prison. Throughout this case he was defended by a court-appointed attorney because nearly all of his assets had been seized.

McGriff began serving a life sentence for his crimes at ADX Florence, a federal supermax prison in Colorado. In 2011, he was transferred to United States Penitentiary, Lee, a high-security federal prison in Pennington Gap, Virginia. As of 2026, he is housed back at ADX Florence in Fremont County, Colorado.

== See also ==
- List of crime bosses convicted in the 21st century
