= First Presbyterian Church in Jamaica =

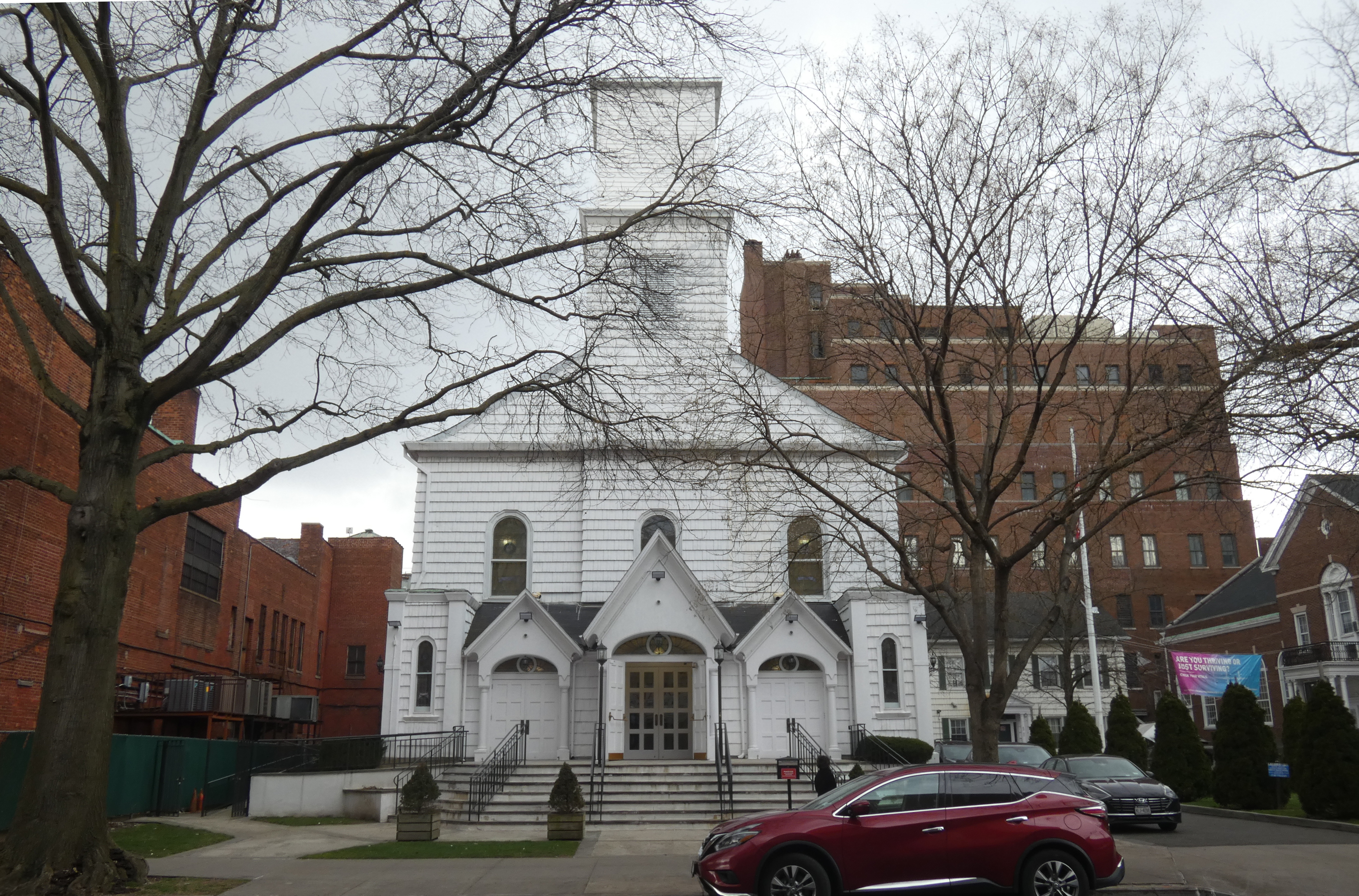
- The church in 2022

- Location within New York City
- 40°42′20″N 73°47′47″W
- Location: Jamaica, Queens, New York City, New York
- Country: United States
- Denomination: Presbyterian Church (U.S.A.)
- Website: http://www.firstchurchjamaica.org/

History
- Status: Church
- Founded: 1662

Architecture
- Completed: 1813

Clergy
- Pastor: Patrick H. O'Connor

The First Presbyterian Church in Jamaica is located in Jamaica, Queens, a neighborhood of New York City. Organized in 1662, it is the oldest continuously serving Presbyterian church in the United States.

== History ==
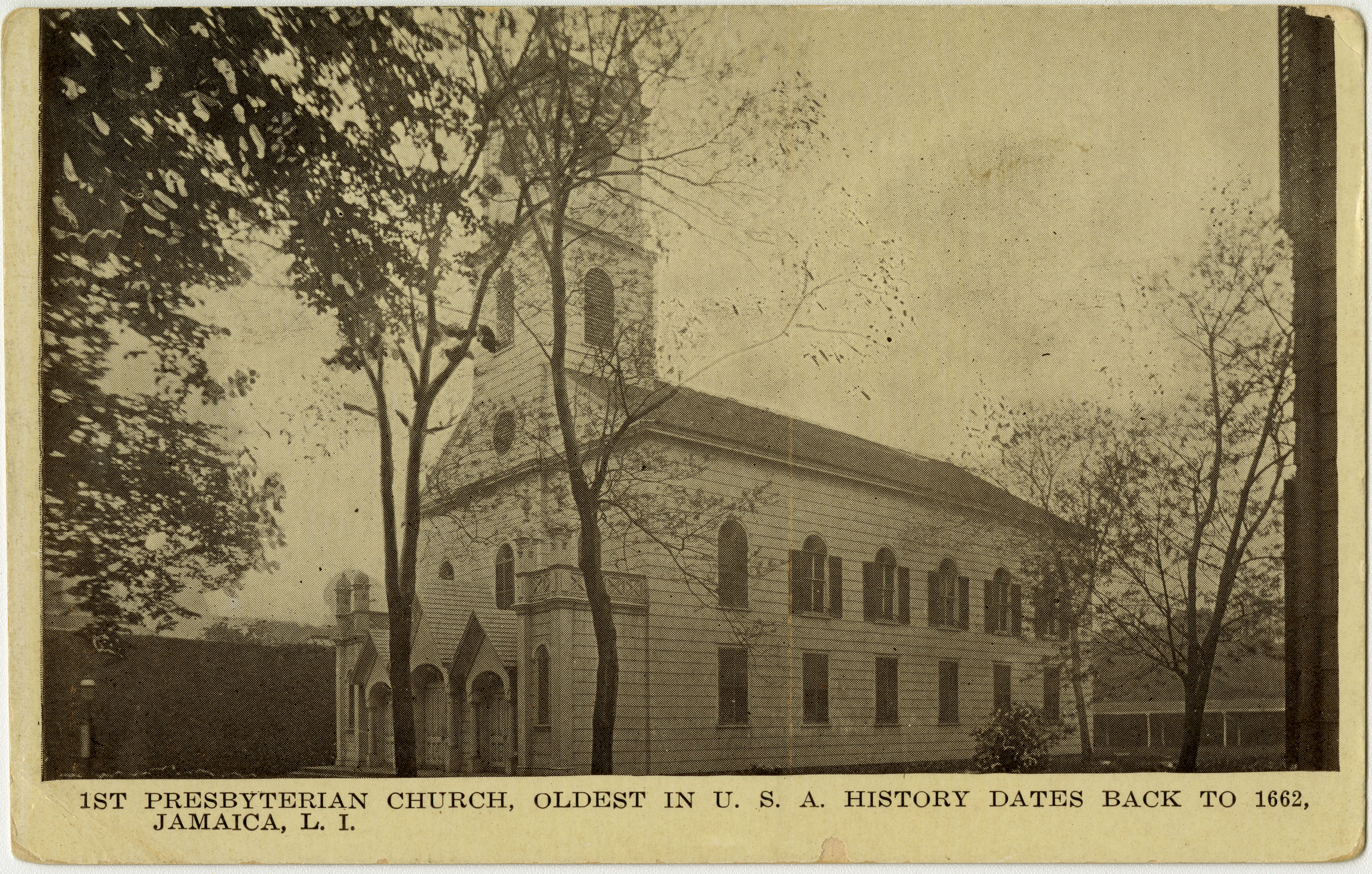
Postcard of the church from the 1920s

The church was first organized in 1662 by Reverend Richard Denton III. Most of its founders came from Halifax, West Yorkshire, England. Though there are older churches on Long Island, this congregation has never stopped service. In 1699, a stone church was built on what is now Jamaica Avenue, paid for by tax dollars. In 1702, the congregations of Grace Episcopal and First Reformed split off. A new church was constructed in 1813 near what is now 163rd Street. It was moved, along with a manse built in 1824, in 1920 to the present location at 89-60 164th Street. Two years later, a bronze tablet was erected to mark the 260th anniversary. In 1925, a church house, now known as the Magill Memorial Building, was erected to accommodate the growing church's need for office and classroom space. In 1959, Donald Trump was confirmed here and attended services in his formative years. In April 2008, the church celebrated its 345th anniversary. Later that year, the church turned down landmark recognition by the New York City Landmarks Preservation Commission.

== Ministries and community outreach ==
Internal ministries include communications within the church (e.g. newsletter, bulletin, etc.); drama within the church (e.g. Christmas pageants); small group ministries centering on personal interests; Brothers on the Move, the men's ministry; Presbyterian Women; and the Alice Horn Gift Shop, including the Pastor's Book of the Month Club.

The church has many community outreach programs, including blood drives, prostate cancer screenings, sponsoring Girl Scouts and Cub Scouts, and running the Bread of Life Food Pantry, which serves the nearly 39% of homes in Queens afflicted by hunger. It also partners with many organizations, including Alcoholics Anonymous, Blood Services of New York City, the Cornell University Extension Program, and the New York City Department of Youth and Community Development.

The church also partners with YouthWorks, which allows young people from all over the world to experience the diversity of culture and worship styles found in Jamaica.

== Tree of Life Center ==
The Tree of Life Center is an outreach program to economically empower Jamaica, and make individuals in the community self-sufficient. Programs at the Center include GED, ESL, and SAT preparation, financial literacy and job readiness classes, and hunger relief. The center also complements existing social service providers.

== See also ==
- Jamaica First German Presbyterian Church
- Prospect Cemetery (Queens)
- Sidewalk clock on Jamaica Avenue
