= Jamaica First German Presbyterian Church =

Jamaica First German Presbyterian Church (historical)
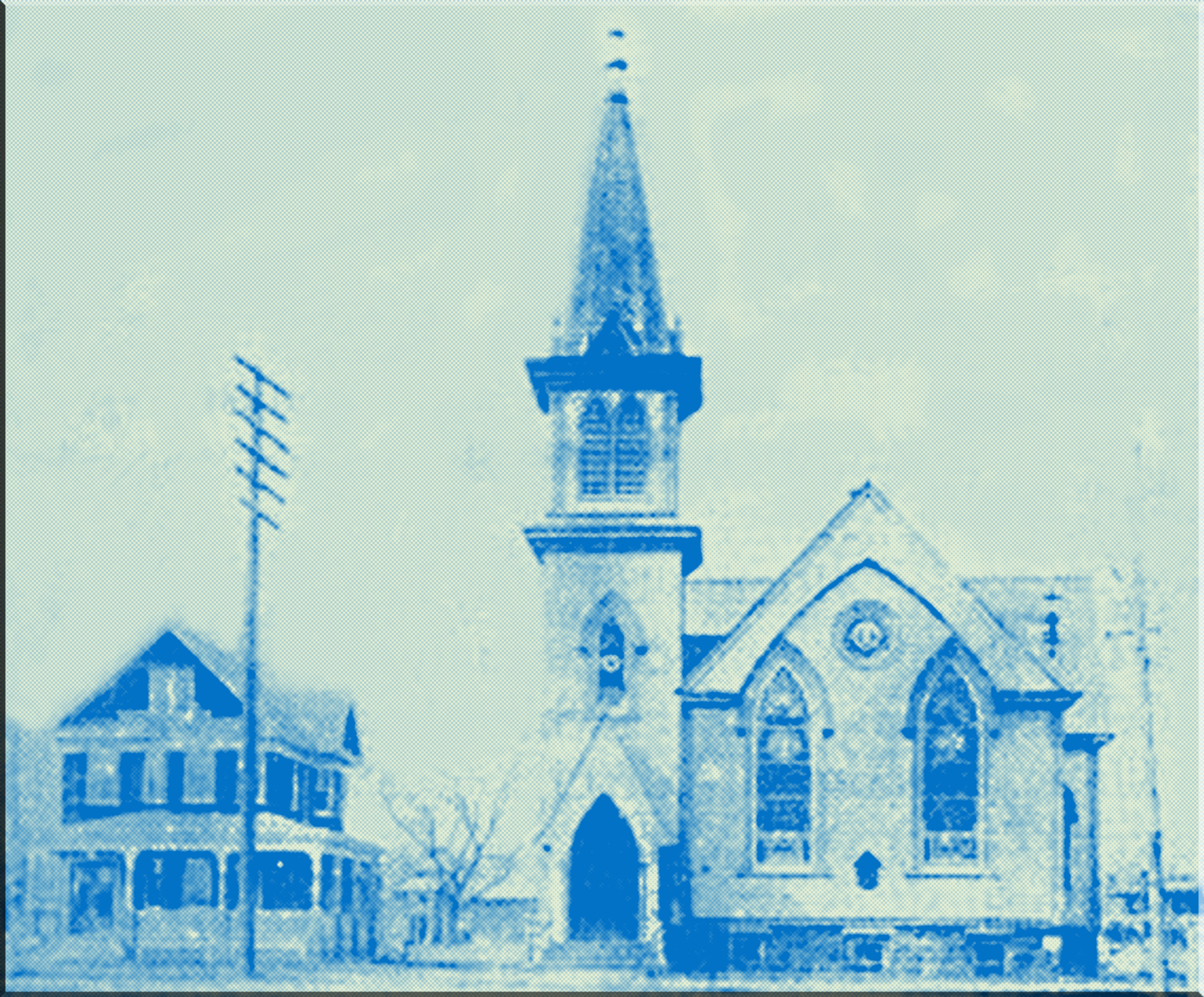
- Photo of the church circa 1906

- 40°42′30″N 73°46′55″W
- Location: 179-09 Jamaica Ave., Jamaica, Queens, New York City, New York
- Country: United States
- Denomination: Presbyterian Church (U.S.A.)

History
- Status: Church
- Founded: 1902

Architecture
- Architectural type: Late Gothic Revival, Shingle style architecture
- Completed: 1900

Clergy
- Pastor: Rev. Ferdinand O. Zesch

Jamaica First German Presbyterian Church is a historic Presbyterian church in the Jamaica neighborhood of Queens in New York City.

== Design ==
The church, built in 1900, is a Late Gothic Revival style, in a de-shingled Shingle Style with a steep slate gable roof. It features twelve large pointed arched windows and an 80-foot-tall (24 m), square bell tower. The church is the first building for its German-speaking congregation, founded in 1902.

Also on the property is a manse built in 1907. It is a 2 1/2-story frame residence that has not been used since 1971.

== Early history ==
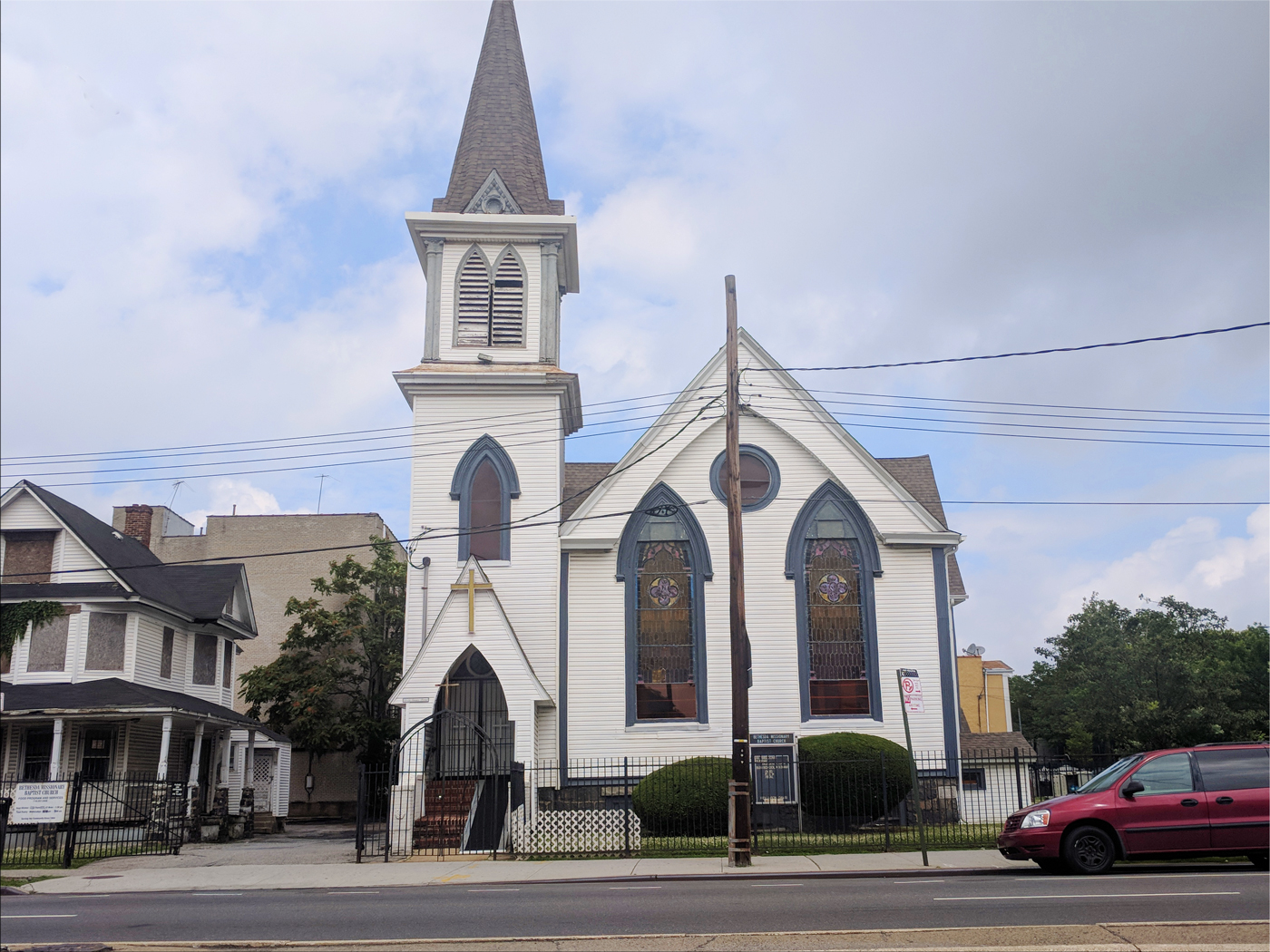
Bethesda Missionary Church

Built in 1900 in a de-shingled "Shingle Style", this was originally the First German Presbyterian Church of Jamaica, and the house at left (partially boarded-up) was the manse. The first pastor, Reverend Christopher Bauer presented the morning sermon in German for the elders of the community, and the evening service was in English, to accommodate the younger brethren who were born in America. Originally 40 members joined in to build the church and the manse, by 1906 it had grown to 86 parishioners and had 106 minors attending Sunday school. With the passing of some key founders the church fell on hard times, resorting to donations to help pay the mortgage.

This portion of Jamaica in the early 20th century was primarily German and Dutch immigrants and farm laborers supplying produce to Fulton Street (Jamaica Avenue) farmers markets. In 1910 - During Sunday evening service the reverend was proceeding thru a particularly laudatory period of his service when he suddenly paused and gripped the lectern. Frightened, the women in the pews began to cry and men rushed forward to aid the pastor. Indicating his heart, he was placed on cushions and the doctor summoned. It was too late, by the time the doctor arrived the pastor had passed due to chronic heart disease and a coronary brought on by excitement. Rev. Ferdinand O. Zesch, 58, passed while giving the sermon at the 1st German Presbyterian and this was reported in the New York Times and New York Observer.

In 1914 the congregation changed its name to the Hillside Presbyterian Church of Queens and in 1962 merged with the Jamaica Hillside Presbyterian Church, Queens, N.Y. The active congregation since 1969 has been known as the First Presbyterian Church in Jamaica, Queens, NY, having merged with the original English speaking church and is officially part of the Presbyterian Church (USA). First Presbyterian is the oldest continually active congregation in Queens having begun at the Old stone church at the head of Meeting House Lane (Union Hall St.) and Fulton St. (Jamaica Ave).

First German PC is now home to the Bethesda Missionary Baptist Church congregation.

== Bethesda Missionary ==
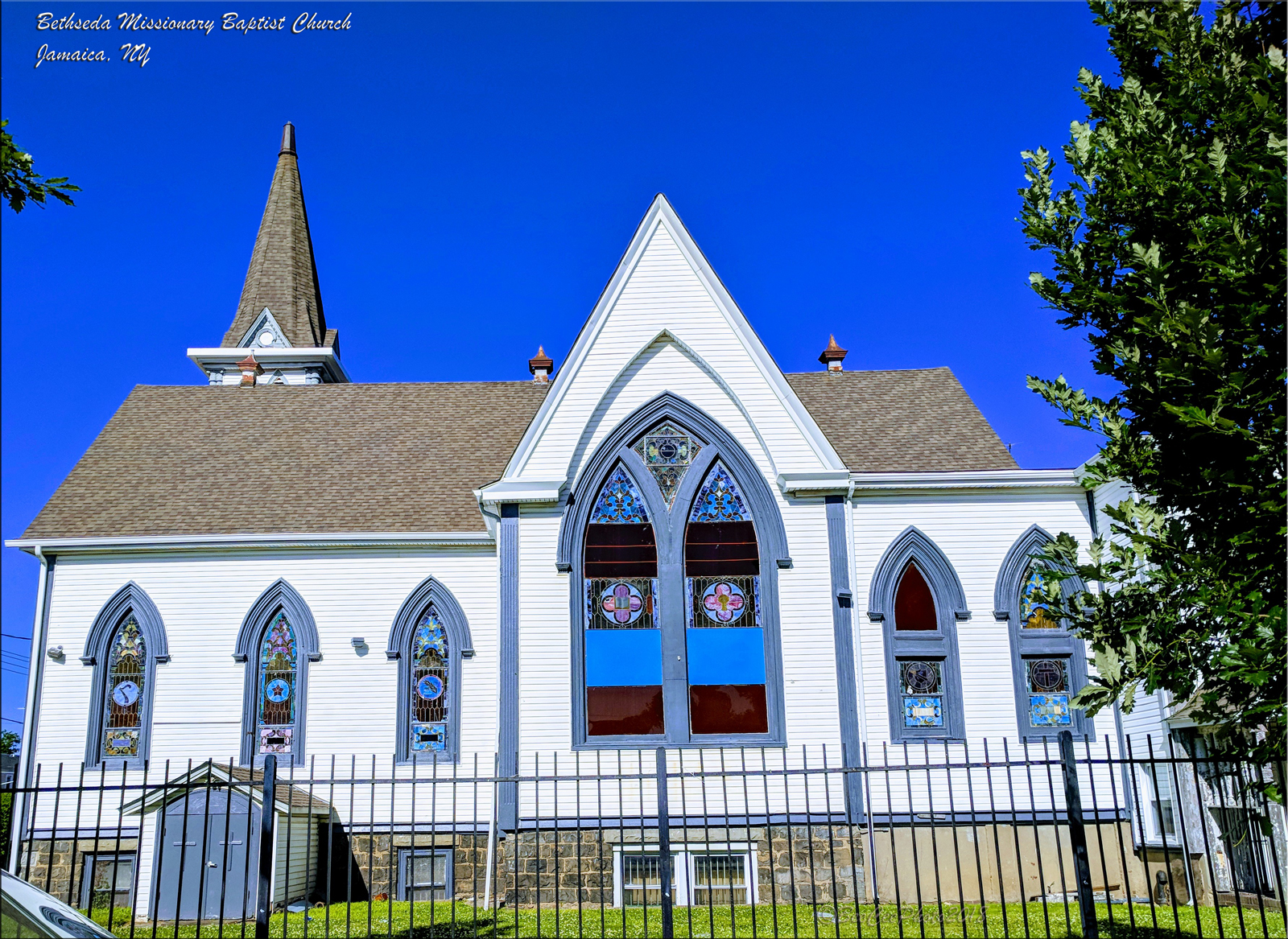

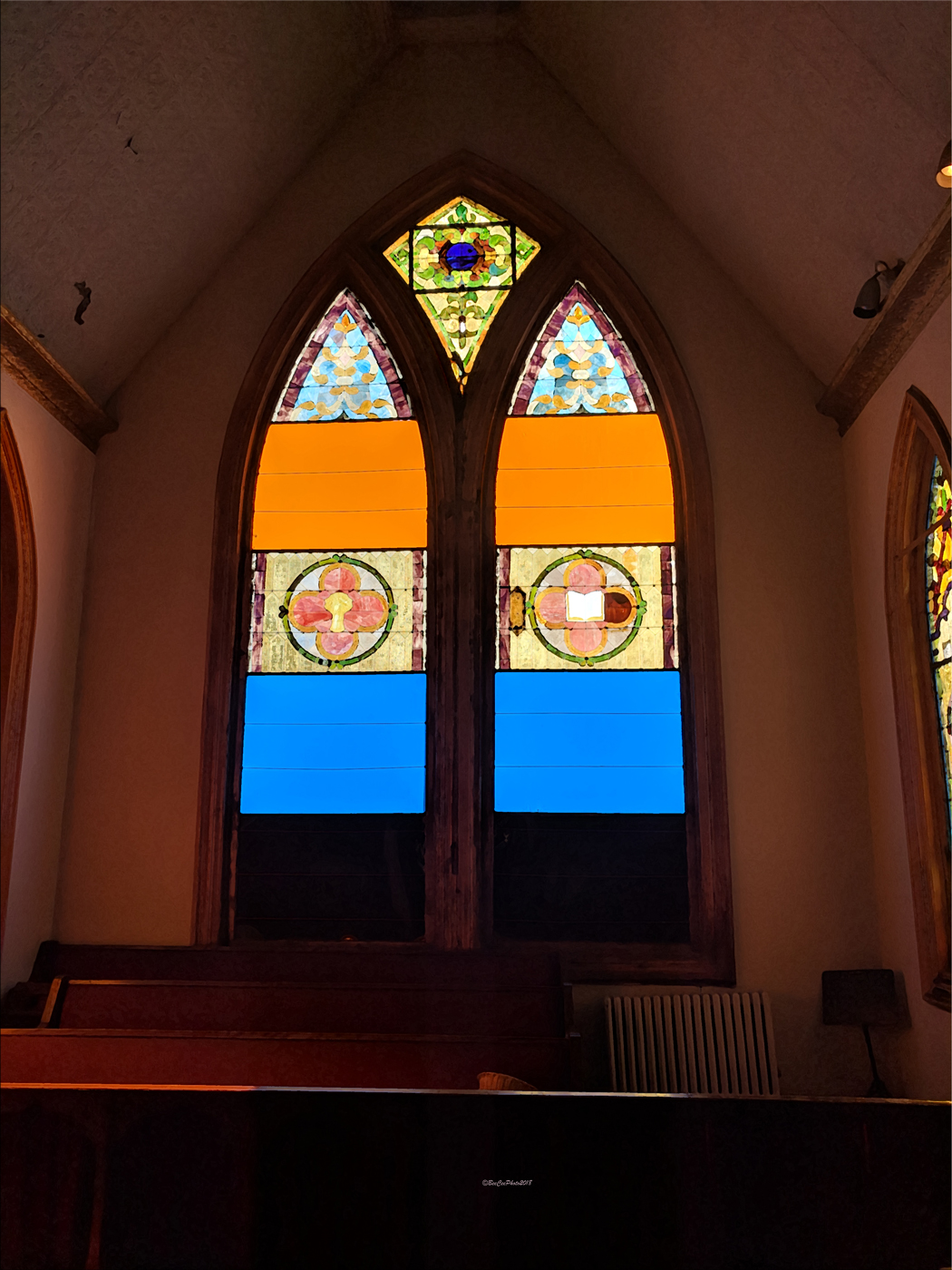

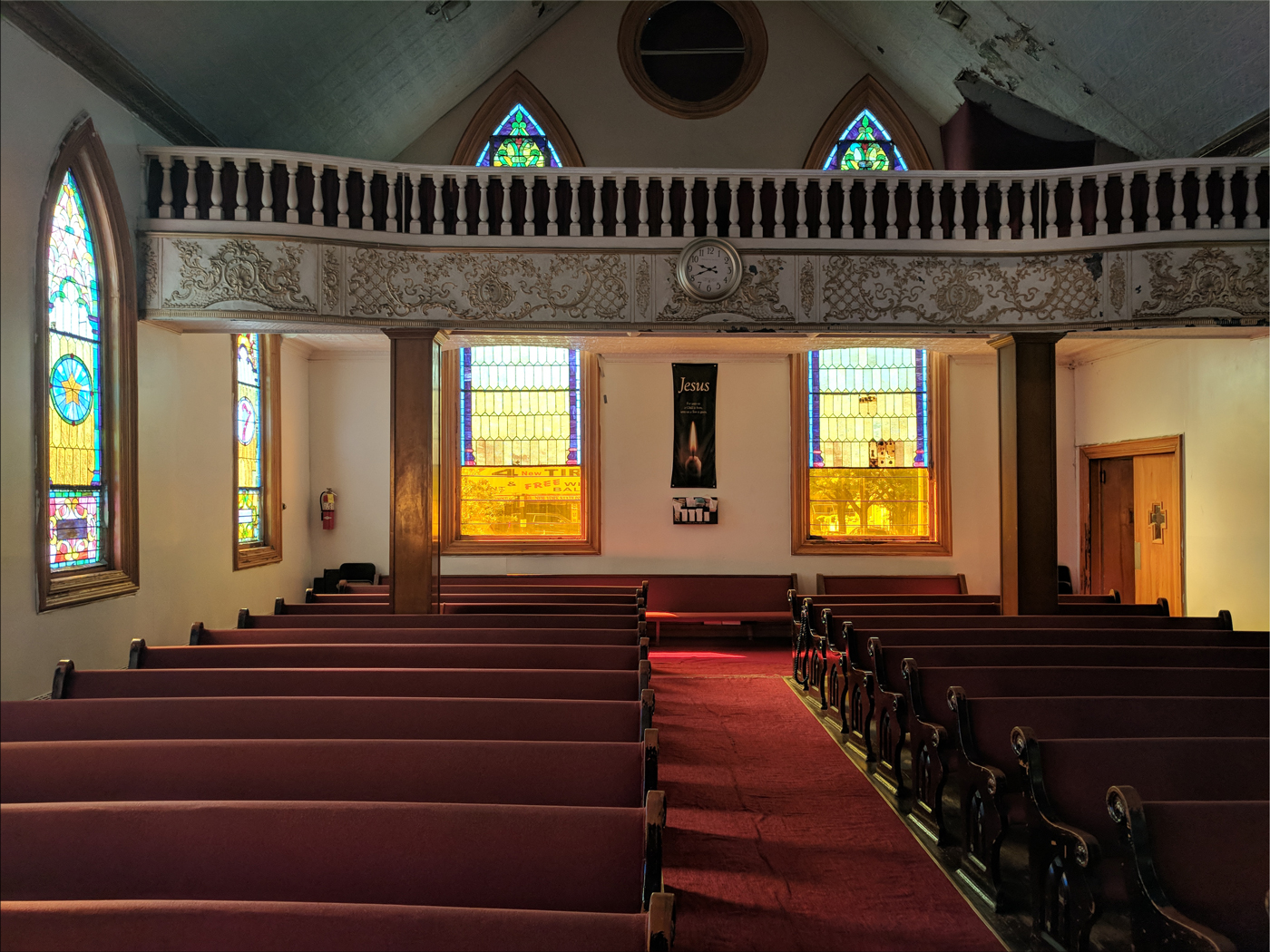

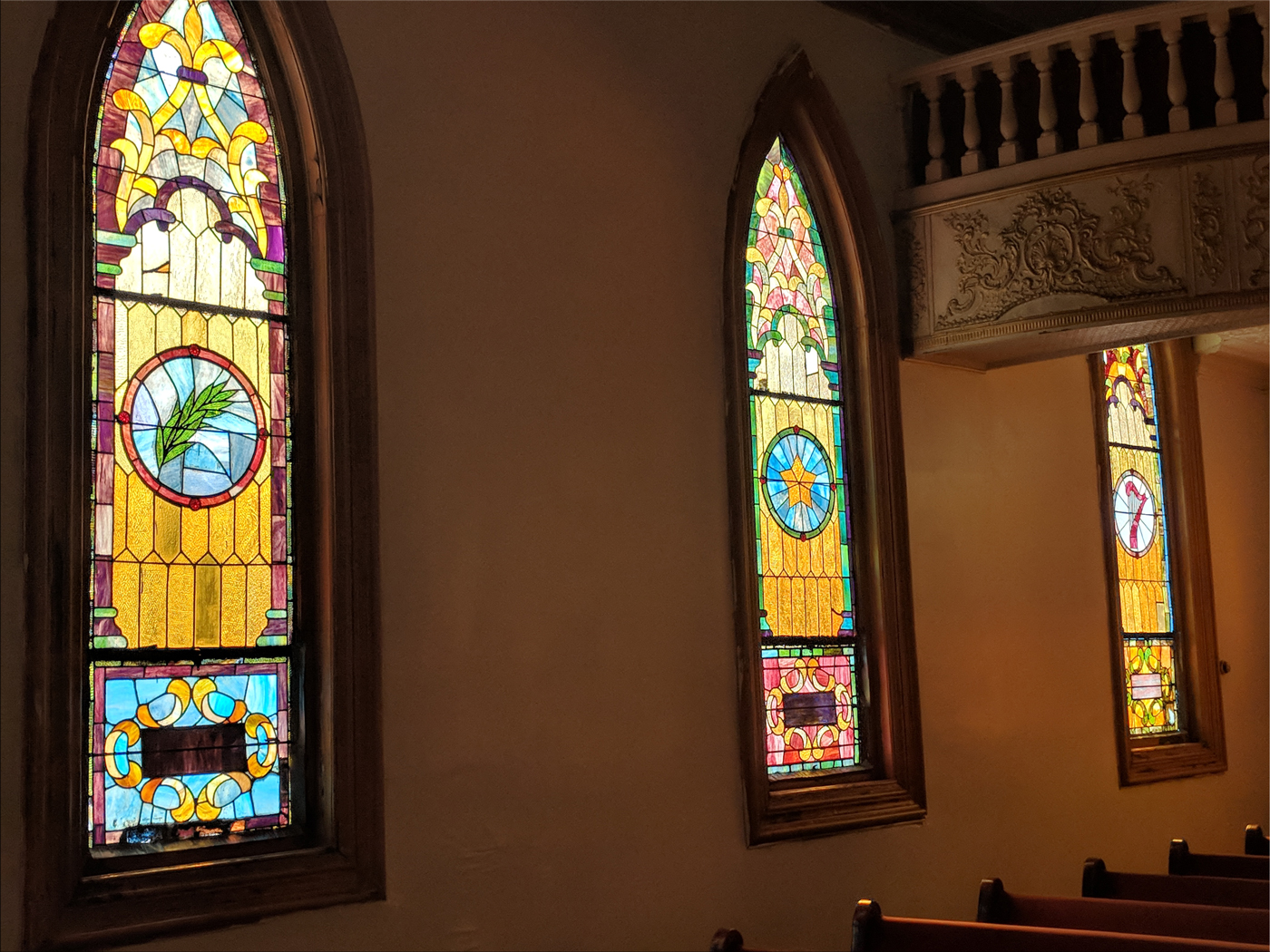

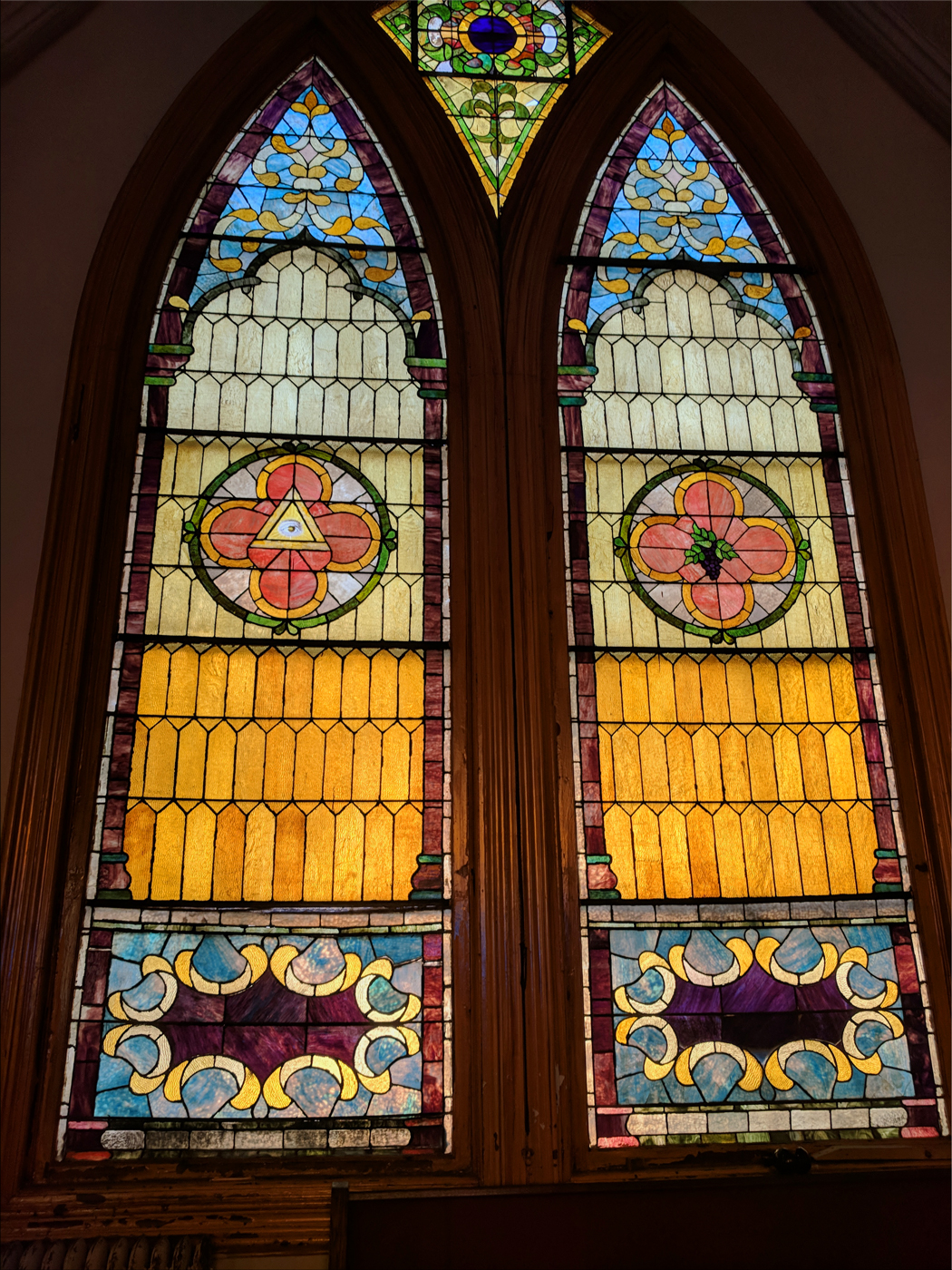

In 1984 Bethesda took over the building and proceeded to restore the stained glass windows and pews. The sanctuary and lectern were restored and the organ replaced with electronic instruments. The church operates a food bank and conducts English services and Sunday school.
