= Prospect Cemetery (Queens) =

Historic cemetery in Queens, New York

- U.S. National Register of Historic Places
- New York City Landmark
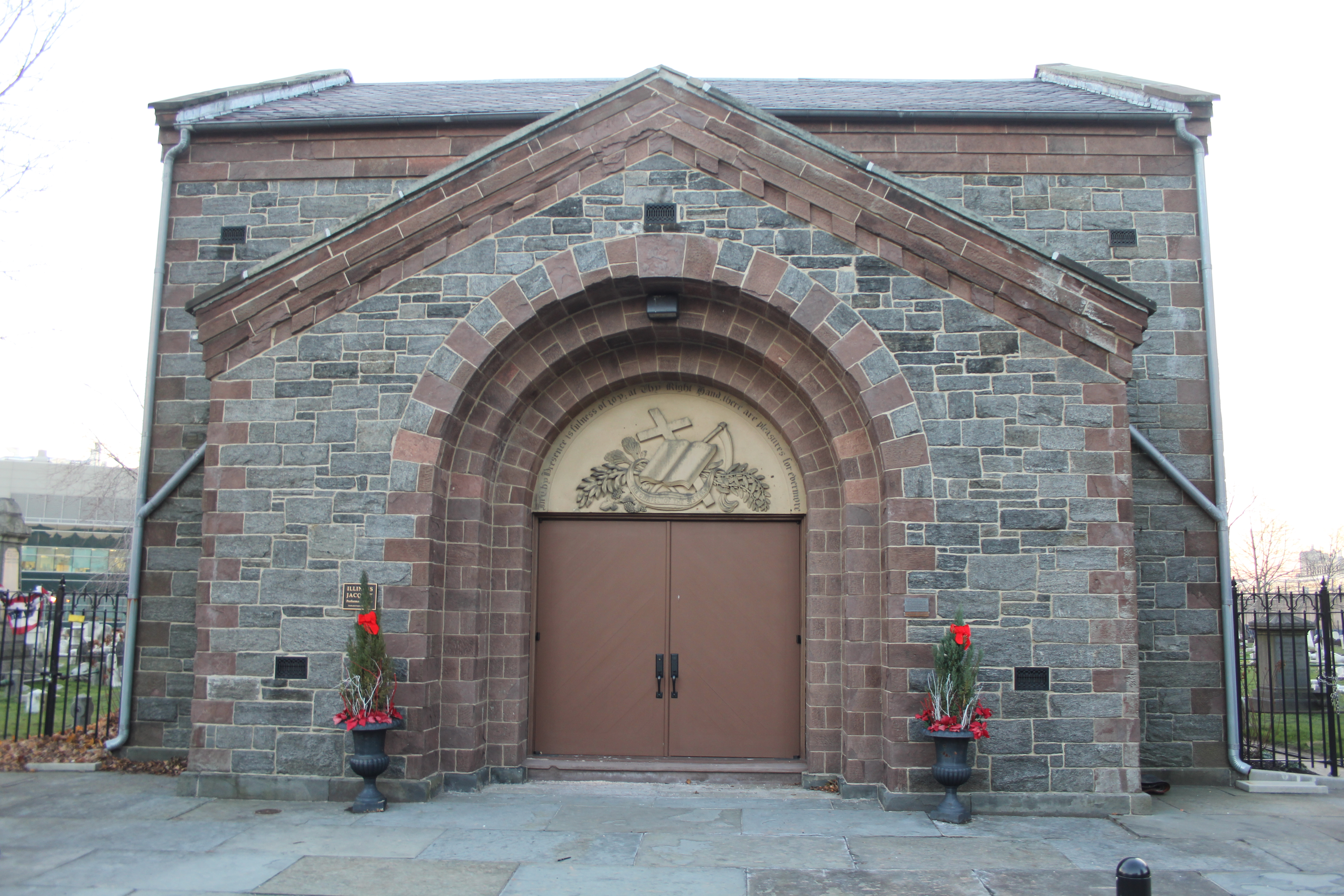
- Chapel of the Sisters within the cemetery
- Location: 159th St. and Beaver Rd., Jamaica, New York
- Coordinates: 40°42′04″N 73°48′01″W
- Area: 4 acres (1.6 ha)
- Built: 1668
- NRHP reference No.: 01001438
- NYCL No.: 0945

Significant dates
- Added to NRHP: January 11, 2002
- Designated NYCL: January 11, 1977

Prospect Cemetery is a historic cemetery located in the Jamaica section of the New York City borough of Queens. It was established in 1668 and known as the "burring plas." The cemetery's original main gate was on Beaver Road which led from Sutphin Boulevard to Jamaica Avenue. The cemetery was generally known as the Presbyterian burial ground and is one of the few remaining Colonial cemeteries in Queens.

The New York City Landmarks Preservation Commission has designated the cemetery as an official city landmark, stating that Prospect Cemetery is the oldest cemetery in New York and that it is regarded as a place of great historical and aesthetic interest, as well as one of the city's important cultural locations. It was listed on the National Register of Historic Places in 2002.

== History ==
=== Dispute between Anglicans and Presbyterians ===
The First Presbyterian Church (founded in 1662) was given control of the care and maintenance of the cemetery after it was taken from the care of the town. There was a dispute between this Church and the Grace Episcopal Church (founded in 1701) in regard to which church would maintain the cemetery. The dispute went back to 1704, When Lord Cornbury became governor, he confiscated the church and the parsonage in Jamaica village and placed them at the disposal of the congregation of the Anglican Church on the grounds that the building had been paid for by public taxation. The Episcopalians then refused the other congregations the use of it. Whereupon, the Presbyterians brought suit and recovered both the parsonage and the church, which they continued to use until the present edifice was built in 1813 on 164th street at 90th ave. Cornbury's fortunes and that of the Whigs had turned by 1709 when he was accused of persecution of the Presbyterians by confiscating church property and imprisoning their ministers, there was much violence during that period relating to land grabs in New York and elsewhere.

=== Early arrivals ===
The cemetery includes approximately 240 family plots containing 2,100 burials and date from the founding of the cemetery to the late 20th century. One such family is the Brinckerhoffs, which carries two Dutch names: “Brenger” meaning messenger and “Hof” meaning court. The first and earliest Brinckerhoff to arrive in New York City was Joris Dirckson, who arrived in North America in 1638 from the European Netherlands for a better life. Furthermore, two researchers from the Rufus King Chapter of the Daughters of the American Revolution discovered the names of 54 individuals who served as soldiers during the Revolutionary War, who were buried in Prospect Cemetery. The last burial was in 1988.

=== Chapel of the Sisters – 1857 ===
Included on the property as a contributing building is the Chapel of the Sisters, erected in 1857. Nicholas Ludlum was personally responsible for the construction of the “Chapel of the Sisters,” named so to honor his three daughters who died years before. In 2007, Queens Borough President Helen Marshall, in collaboration with preservation and community groups, celebrated the restoration of the Chapel of the Sisters, which took almost five years of fundraising by the Greater Jamaica Development Corporation and the New York Landmarks Conservancy. The main highlight within this project was to restore two rose windows decorating the north and south facades of the chapel. It was built as a Romanesque Revival building and measured approximately 40 by 40 feet and 25 feet high. The chapel was restored and in 2008 was re-dedicated as the Illinois Jacquet Performance Space, for the famous jazz saxophonist who lived in Addesleigh park, a jazz enclave in Jamaica. After upgrades that included a new heating plant, new plumbing and electrical systems, replacement wood windows and entry doors, new floors, and other stonework and design improvements, the chapel re-emerged as a concert/event space, which enabled the venue to be used for meetings and presentations.

=== Restoration ===
Before, during, after the 1980s, plans were made by various groups, committees, and individuals to properly maintain and preserve Prospect Cemetery. During this time, Prospect Cemetery had become a location of deterioration and vandalism beneath trash, poison ivy, and broken tombs. Amy Anderson, who took it upon herself to correct this stagnation/problem, stated “My ancestors came here and settled this country. I’m an American. I’m not going to let this go”. Not only was the cemetery found to be an official New York City landmark, but it was, according to Dr. Sherene Baugher, found to be the fourth-oldest surviving cemetery in the five boroughs. Furthermore, as part of the National Guard's Challenge Program for high school dropouts, 80 National Guard members and 14 students spend the day (Saturday, November 23, 1998) hacking, raking, and clearing the front half of the cemetery (near 159th Street and Liberty Avenue). Aside from restoring the dignity of the graves within Prospect Cemetery, the cleanup of about an acre of this property helped to destroy an environment conducive to drug trade and crime, as stated by event organizers.

== Notable interments ==
- Egbert Benson – was a Founding Father of the United States who represented New York in the Continental Congress, and the United States House of Representatives, and who served as a member of the New York State constitutional convention in 1788 which ratified the United States Constitution. Attorney General of the State of New York, Chief Justice of the New York Supreme Court, and as a judge and Chief Judge on the United States Circuit Court for the Second Circuit. He is one of the Dutch Americans alongside John Jay to lead the American Revolution
- Bergen Family – Bergen Beach is their namesake, as well as Bergen Street in Brooklyn
- Brinkerhoff Family – 110th Ave is their namesake
- Lefferts Family – Lefferts Boulevard in Queens is their namesake
- Nostrand Family – Nostrand Avenue in Brooklyn is their namesake, also Van Noorstrand
- Remsen Family – Remsens and Carpenters intermarried, Remsen Street in Brooklyn is named after this family
- Sutphin Family – The major north-south Sutphin Boulevard is named after this family
- Van Wyck family – The Van Wyck Expressway is named after the most famous member, Robert Van Wyck

== Gallery ==
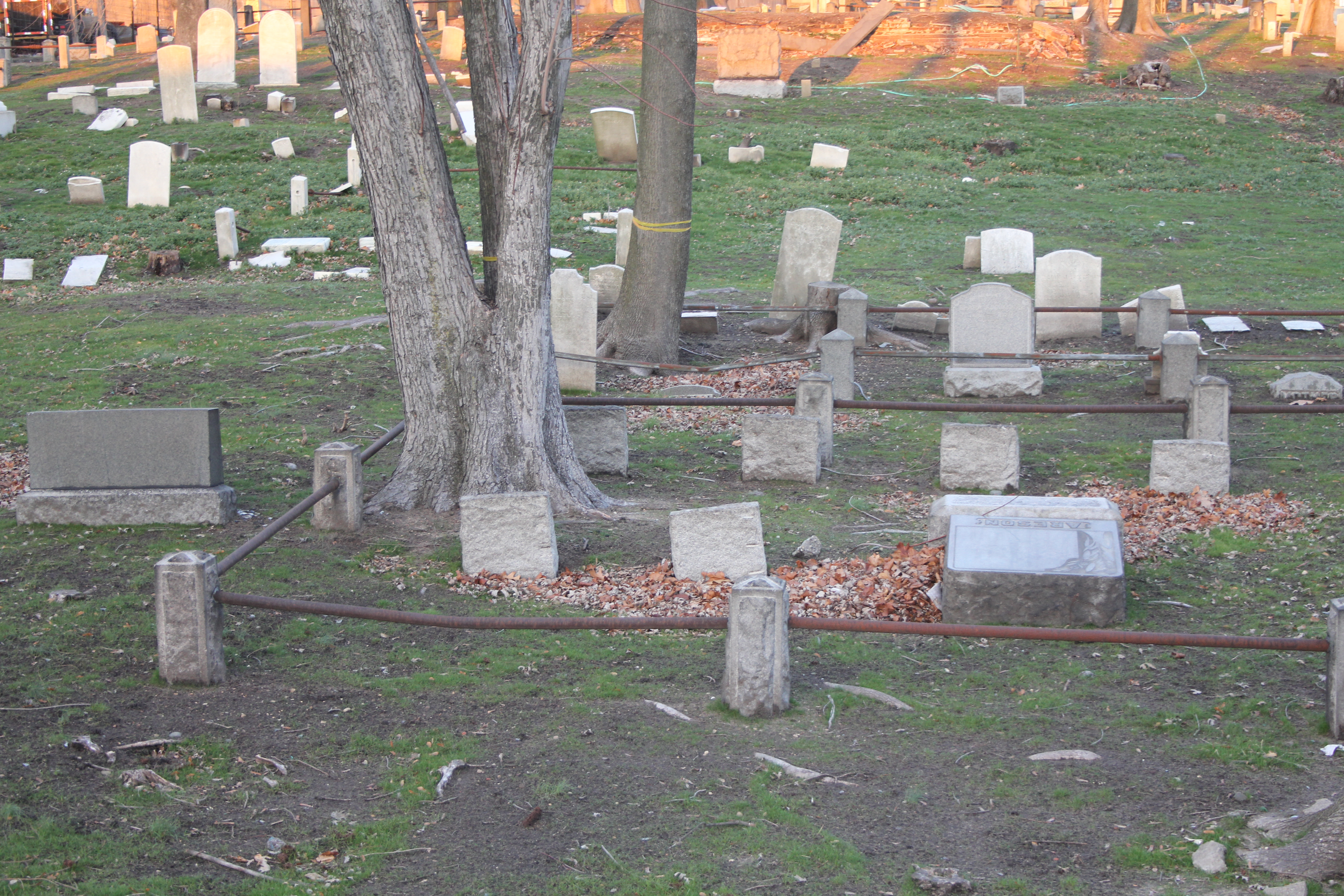
Gravestones in the cemetery

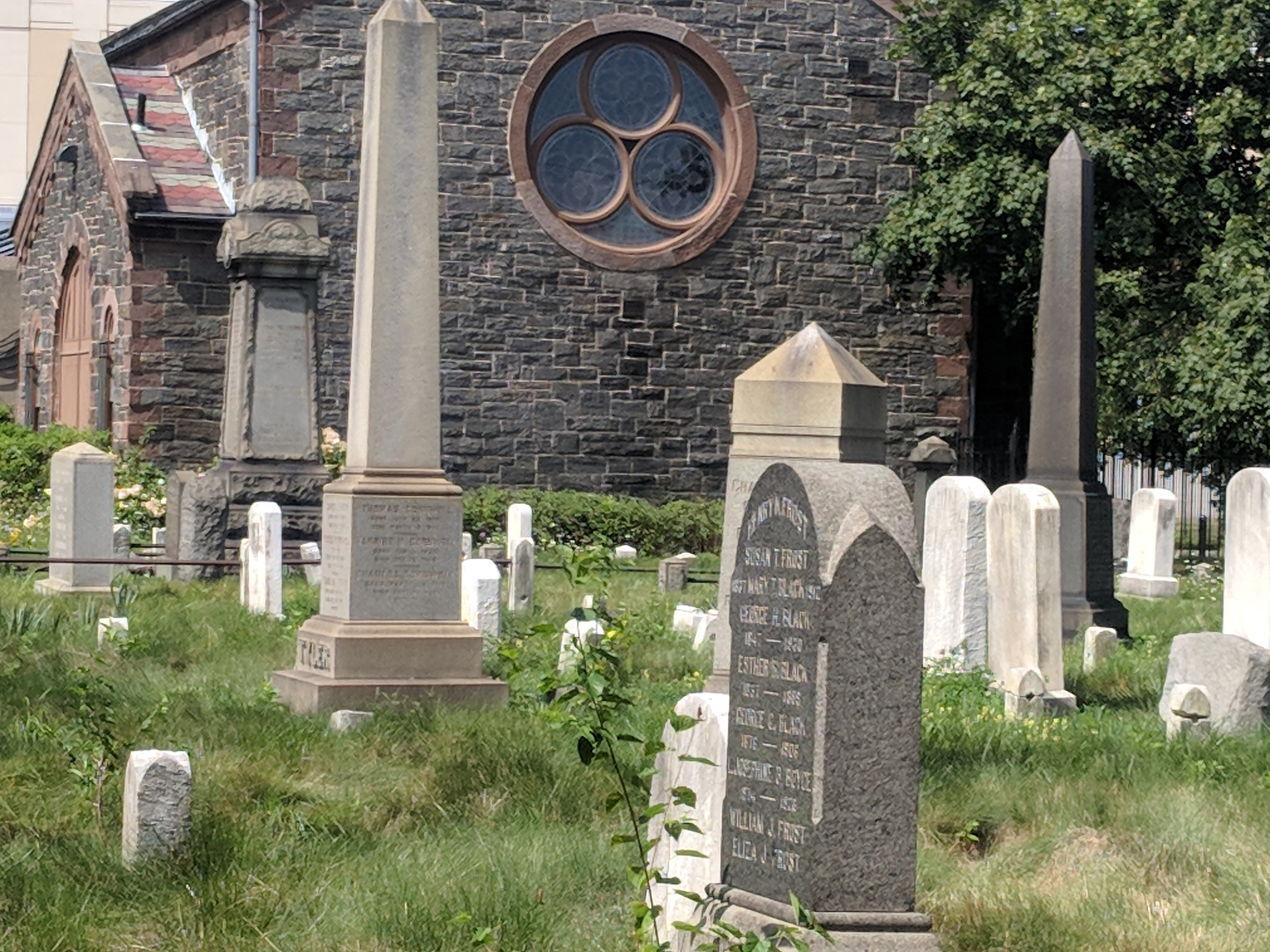
Chapel of the Sisters

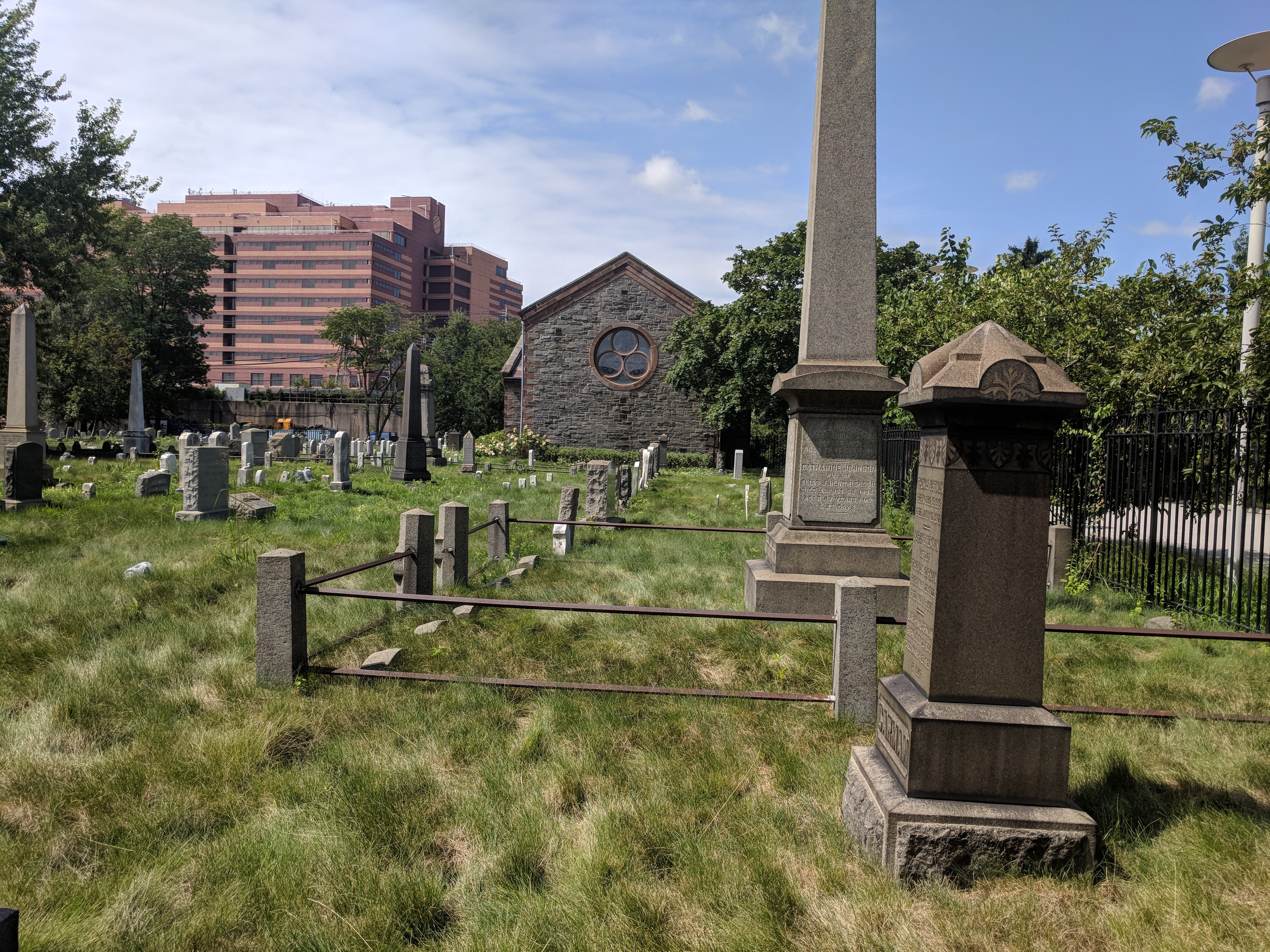
Graves

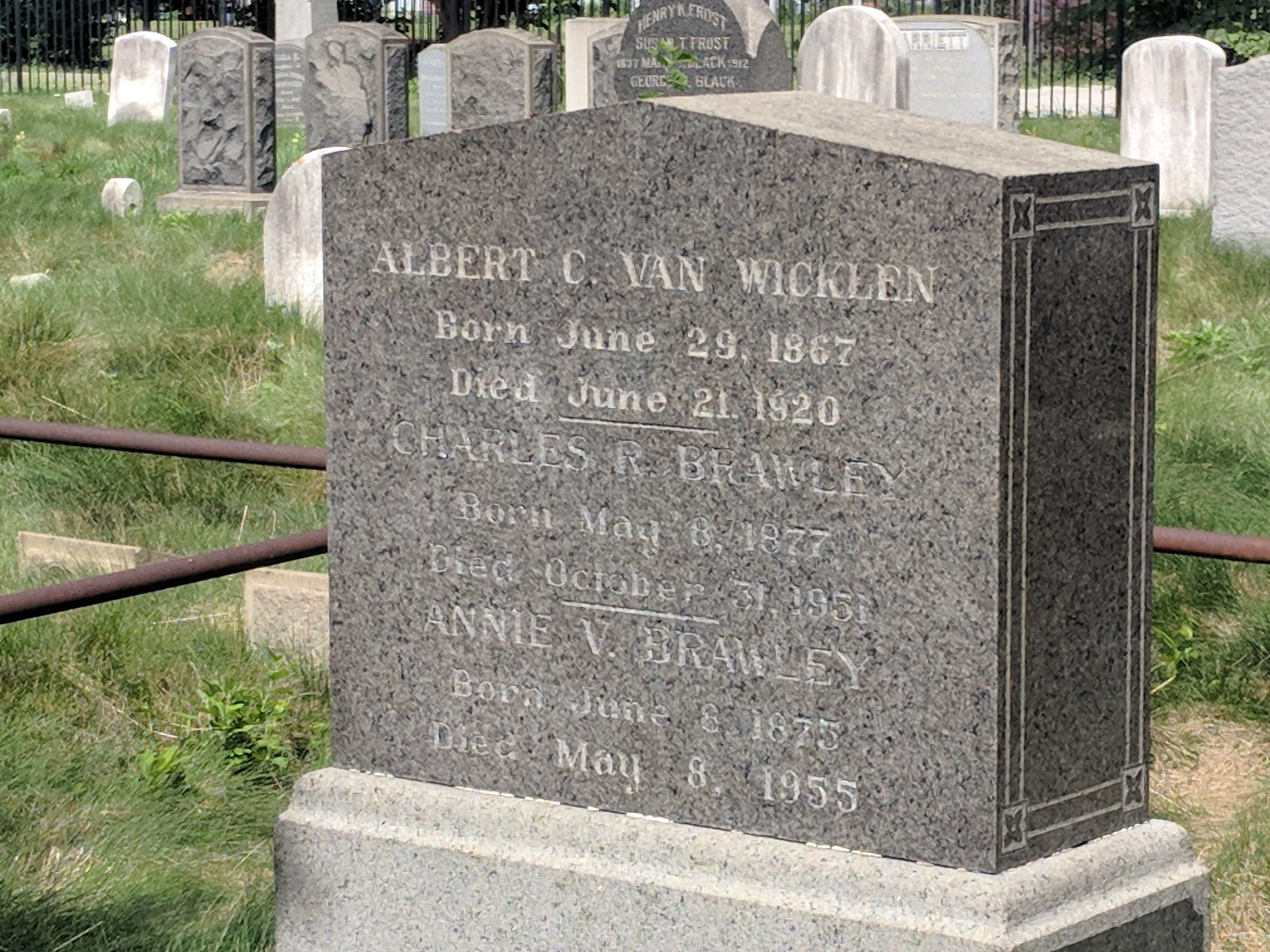
Albert Van Wicklen headstone

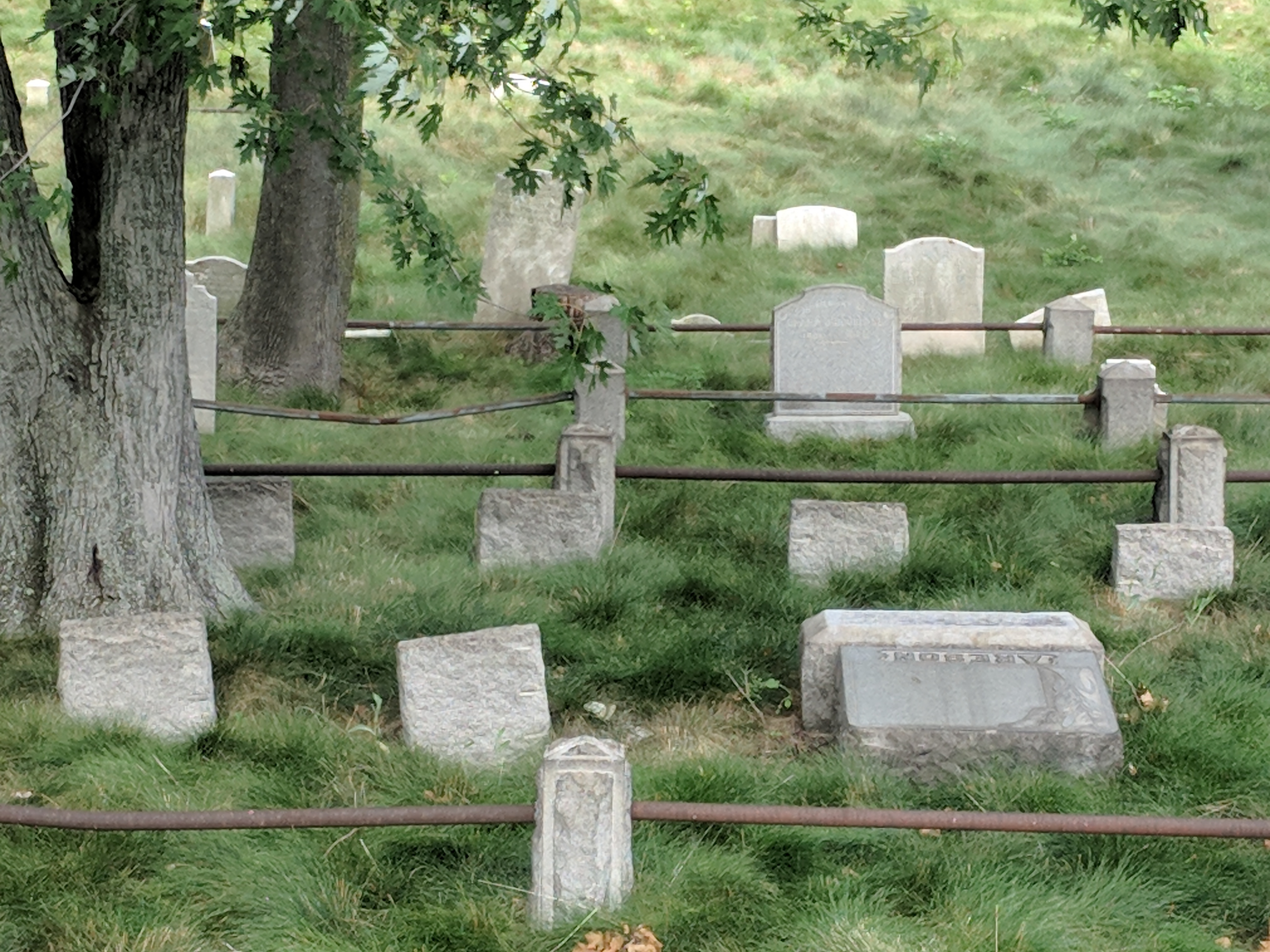
Beaver Street Side

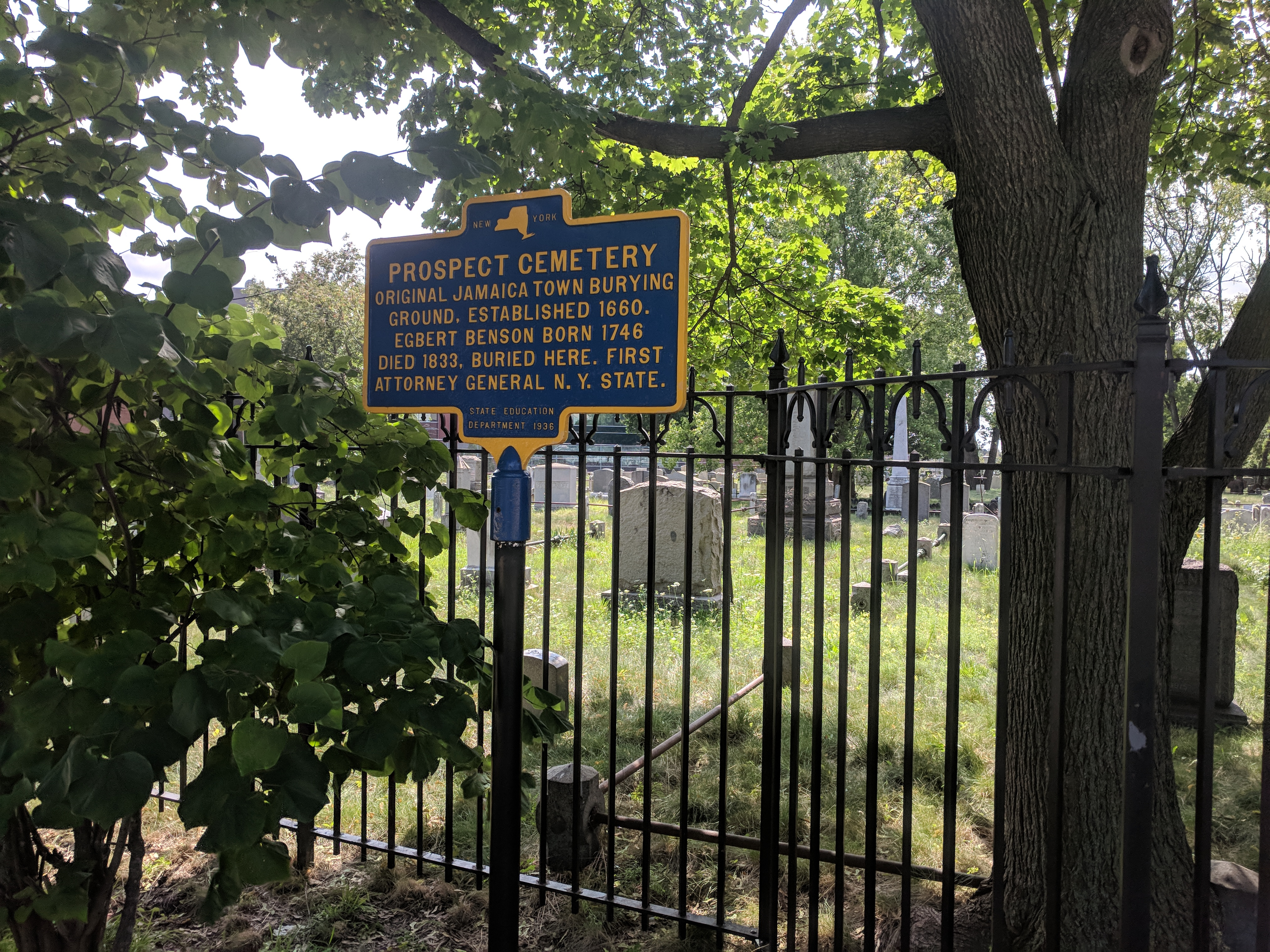
Prospect Cemetery marquee

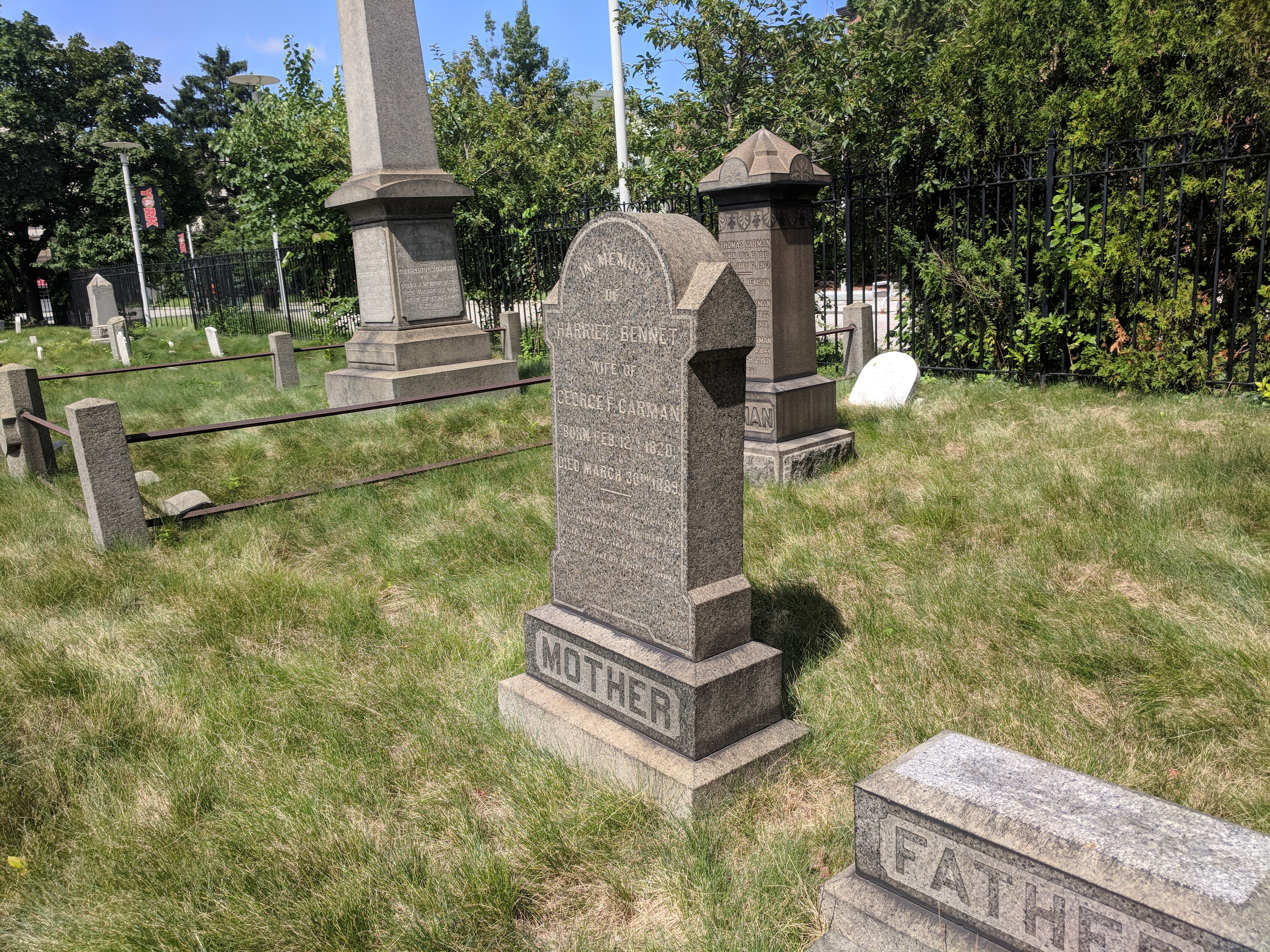
Headstones
