= Jamaica Center for Arts & Learning =

Building in Queens, New York

- Office of the Register
- U.S. National Register of Historic Places
- New York City Landmark
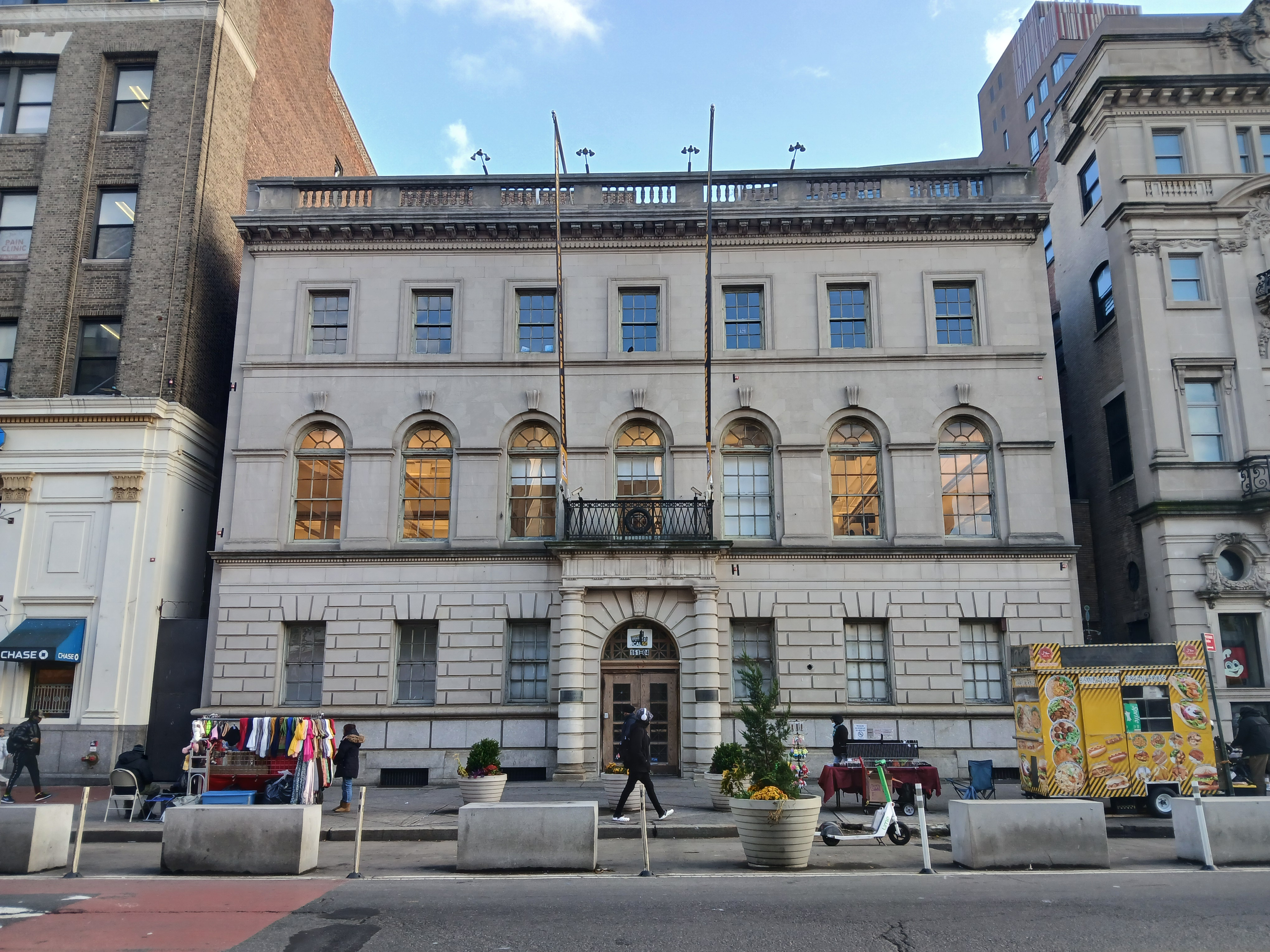
- The former Queens Office of the Register, now the Jamaica Center for Arts and Learning

- Location within New York City Location within New York Location within the United States
- Location: 161-04 Jamaica Avenue, Jamaica, New York 11432, United States
- Coordinates: 40°42′14″N 73°47′53″W
- Area: less than one acre
- Built: 1904
- Architectural style: Late 19th And 20th Century Revivals, Neo-Italian Renaissance
- NRHP reference No.: 80002754
- NYCL No.: 0875

Significant dates
- Added to NRHP: January 3, 1980
- Designated NYCL: November 12, 1974

The Jamaica Center for Arts & Learning (JCAL) in Jamaica, Queens, New York is a performing and visual arts center that was founded in 1972 as part of local efforts to revitalize the surrounding business district. Located in the former Office of the Register, as of 2025, it serves more than 53,000 people annually via two art galleries, along with art, music, and animation studios, a 99-seat proscenium theater, and an additional 400-seat theater located at the Jamaica Performing Arts Center, in what was formerly the First Reformed Church. The organization is one of only 39 members of New York City's Cultural Institutions Group.

== Programs, exhibitions, and events ==
As a multidisciplinary arts center, JCAL offers visual and performing arts and educational programming, including a regular Thursday night jazz series with tickets for $10 and generally held on the second Thursday of the month. Their Meet the Playwright series spotlights new and emerging playwrights with free staged readings of their works for the general public, and it's 2025-26 cohort featured their first-ever all-women season. Other events include their annual Making Moves Dance Festival, which features the works of new and emerging choreographers along with more established artists.

In 2022, JCAL celebrated its 50th anniversary, which included an exhibition of works by artist Danny Simmons and featured a series of artist talks, performances, and events during Simmons's yearlong residency. The organization also houses the Edge School of the Arts (ESOTA), a dance school that offers other arts and cultural programming.

JCAL regularly presents art exhibitions and artist talks, such as the 2025 "Beyond Familiar" exhibit, curated by Wanda Best, founder of Art Transforms, Inc., a visual arts education nonprofit. In 2025, the Port Authority of New York and New Jersey and JFK Millenium Partners announced that the Jamaica Center for Arts and Learning would curate "Queens in Flight," which will feature rotating art works created by Queens-based artists for display at the new Terminal 6 at JFK International Airport.

== Historic buildings ==
The Jamaica Center for Arts & Learning (building exterior) located at 161-04 Jamaica Avenue in Jamaica, New York.

The Jamaica Center for Arts & Learning is located in the former Office of the Register, also known as the Queens Register of Titles and Deeds Building, a historic government building located in the Jamaica section of the New York City borough of Queens. It was built between 1895 and 1913 and is an imposing, three story building with a limestone facade in the Neo-Italian Renaissance style. A rear five story addition was built in 1938. The facade features deep rustication on the first floor and a smooth ashlar surface above. The building housed the Office of the Register until 1974, after which it became the Jamaica Center for Arts & Learning. It was designated a New York City Historic Landmark in 1974 and listed on the National Register of Historic Places in 1980.

The organization's other facility, the Jamaica Performing Arts Center, is located in the former First Dutch Reformed Church, which was added to the National Register of Historic Places in 1980 and as a New York City Landmark in 1996. The building was renovated and then re-opened in 2009 to serve as a second facility for JCAL's arts and cultural programming.

Outside the organization's main location, at 161-04 Jamaica Avenue, is the sidewalk clock on Jamaica Avenue. Located at the corner of Jamaica Avenue and Union Hall Street, it is one of only two remaining cast-iron sidewalk clocks in New York City. Also nearby is the late-Victorian era headquarters of the Jamaica Savings Bank, located next door at 161-02 Jamaica Avenue. It was listed on the National Register of Historic Places in 1983.

== See also ==
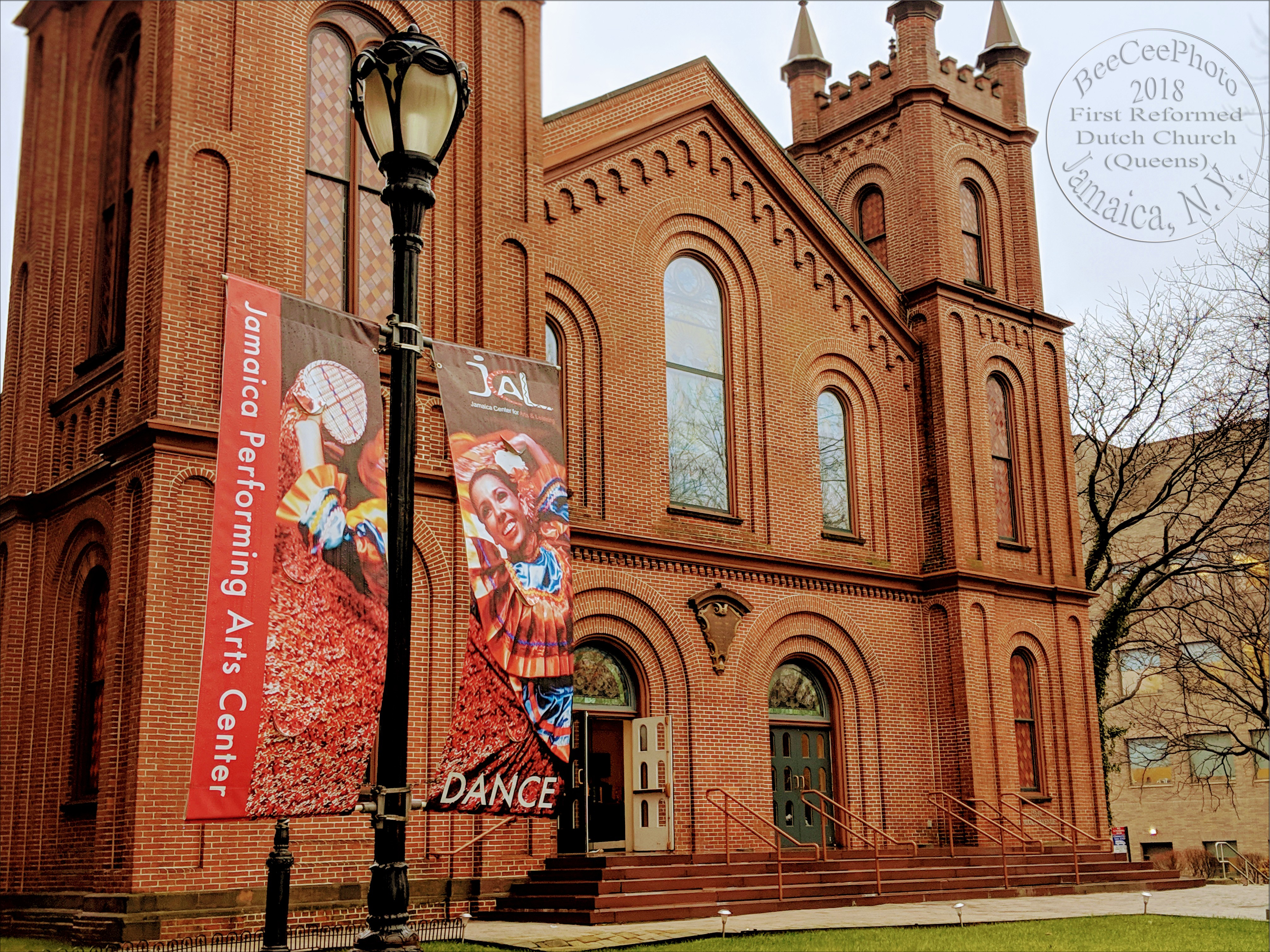
The Jamaica Performing Arts Center is located in the former First Reformed Church at 153-10 Jamaica Avenue in Jamaica, New York.

- First Reformed Church, which serves as the Jamaica Performing Arts Center
- List of New York City Designated Landmarks in Queens
- National Register of Historic Places listings in Queens County, New York
