= First Reformed Church (Queens) =

Historic church in New York City

- U.S. National Register of Historic Places
- New York City Landmark
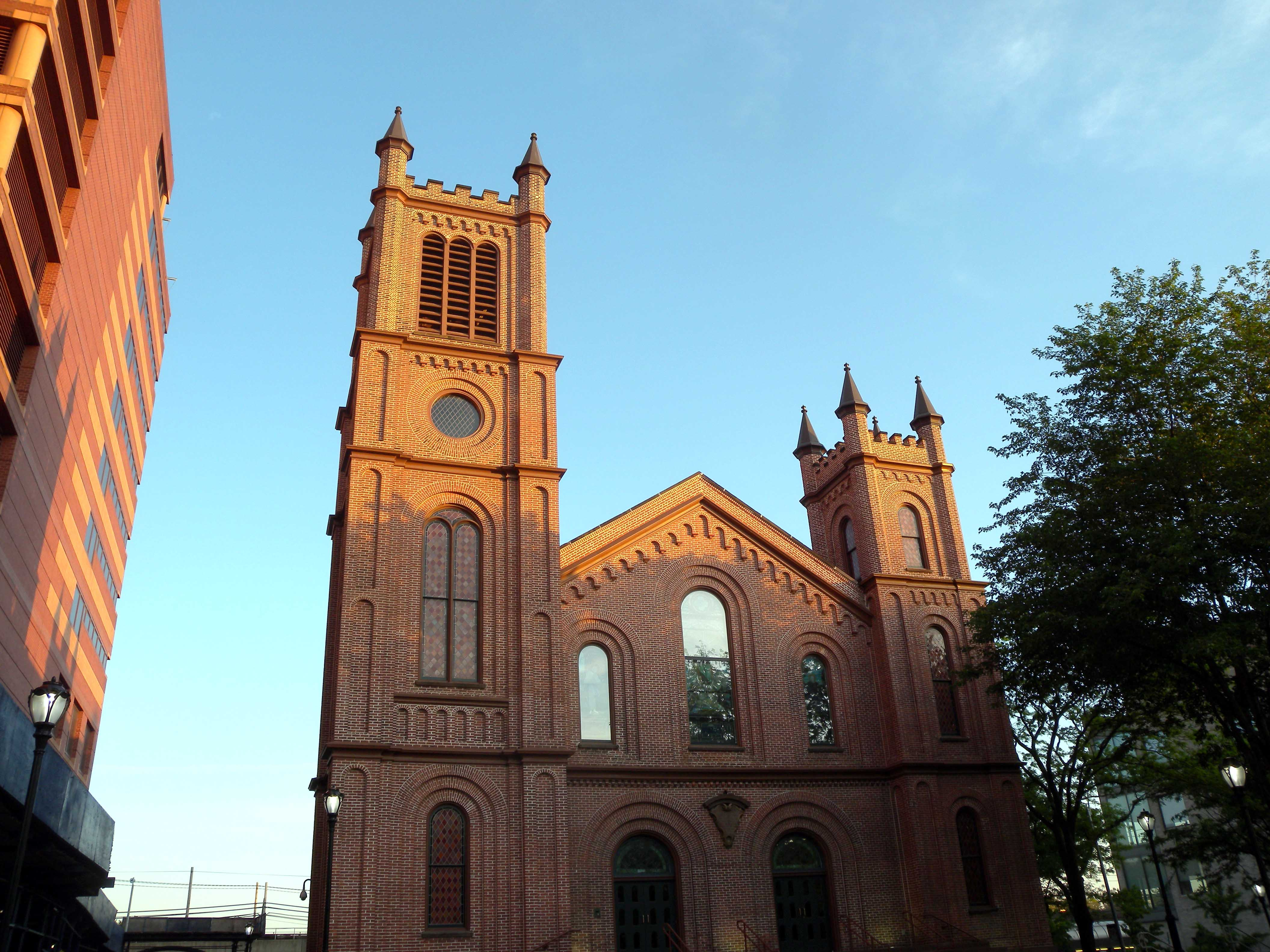
- From Jamaica Avenue

- Location within New York City
- Location: 153-10 Jamaica Ave., Queens, New York City
- Coordinates: 40°42′9″N 73°48′8″W
- Built: 1858
- Architect: Young, Sidney J.; Peterson, Anders
- Architectural style: Romanesque, Early Romanesque Revival
- NRHP reference No.: 80002753

Significant dates
- Added to NRHP: April 16, 1980
- Designated NYCL: January 30, 1996

The First Reformed Church is a historic Reformed church in the Jamaica neighborhood of Queens in New York City. The church was built in 1859. The church has an early Romanesque structure that was designed by Sidney J. Young and built by Anders Peterson. The First Reformed Church has been refurbished as part of the Jamaica Center for Arts & Learning.

The asymmetrical towers, round-arched openings, and corbel tables are examples of an architectural style known as Rundbogenstil.

The church was listed on the National Register of Historic Places in 1980, and a New York City Landmark in 1996.

== See also ==
- List of New York City Designated Landmarks in Queens
- National Register of Historic Places listings in Queens County, New York
