= Sidewalk clock on Jamaica Avenue =

Landmark in Queens, New York

- Sidewalk Clock at 161-10 Jamaica Avenue, New York, NY
- U.S. National Register of Historic Places
- New York City Landmark
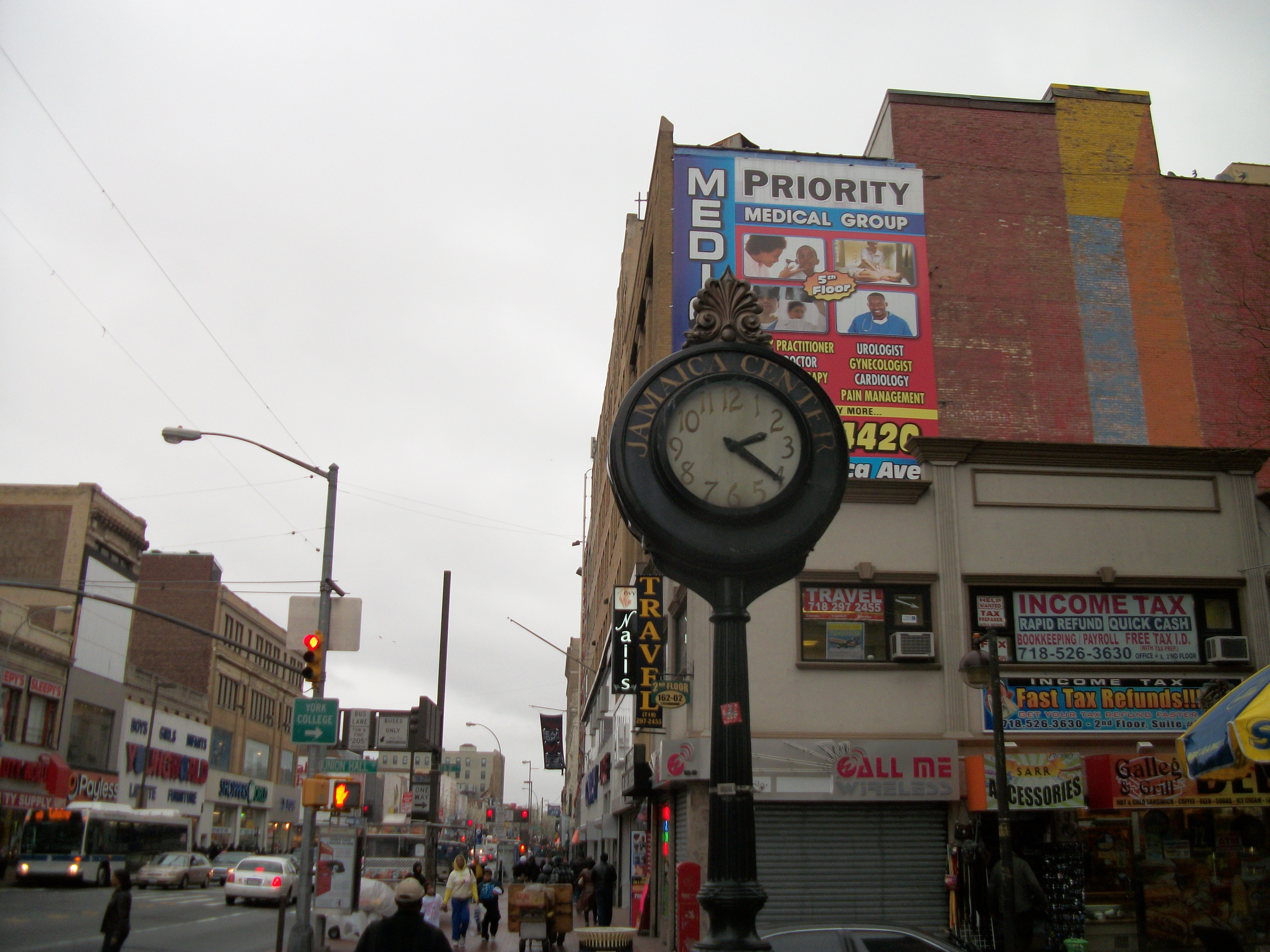
- Historic street clock at Jamaica Avenue and Union Hall Street

- Location within New York City Location within New York Location within the United States
- Location: 92-00a Union Hall Street, Jamaica, New York
- Coordinates: 40°42′15″N 73°47′53″W
- MPS: Sidewalk Clocks of New York City TR
- NRHP reference No.: 85000931
- NYCL No.: 1176

Significant dates
- Added to NRHP: April 18, 1985
- Designated NYCL: August 25, 1981

The sidewalk clock on Jamaica Avenue is an early-20th-century sidewalk clock at the southwest corner of Jamaica Avenue and Union Hall Street in the Jamaica neighborhood of Queens in New York City. The cast iron clock's design incorporates a bell-cast shaped column base and an anthemion finial above the dial casing.

The clock originally was installed at 161-11 Jamaica Avenue but was moved in 1989 to 92-00a Union Hall Street. The clock is a New York City designated landmark and was listed on the National Register of Historic Places in 1985.

== Description ==
Originally erected in 1900 at 161-11 Jamaica Avenue, the clock was designated a New York City landmark in 1981. The Jamaica clock has a pedestal with paneling; a fluted column; and a double-faced clock topped by an anthemion. Originally placed in front of Busch's Jewellers, it is 15 feet (4.6 m) tall.

The clock is similar to cast-iron post (tower) clocks produced between 1881 and 1910 by the E. Howard Clock Company and the Seth Thomas Clock Company. These clocks were manufactured and sold from catalogs for about $600 (equivalent to $20,017 in 2025) and had weight-driven mechanisms, so there is no relation to installed date and date of manufacture. The manufacturer of the clock was originally unknown, as the clock did not match a model that was sold in the Howard or Seth Thomas catalogs. In 2021, restorers found that the clock's design matched one sold by the Self Winding Clock Company. While the Self Winding Company had once made many sidewalk clocks throughout New York City, all of the other clocks had long since been destroyed.

== History ==
The clock likely dates from the early 1900s, though the date of its manufacture is unclear. The clock originally had a dial that took up the entire clock face, which measures 3 feet (0.91 m) wide. It was probably electrified in the 1930s. The earliest known photograph of the clock, a city tax photo, dates from 1940. The photo shows that the clock's original dials had been replaced with smaller ones, which were surrounded by letters that probably showed the name of a business. The exact text of the letters is unknown, as the 1940 tax photo was taken from behind a pillar of the elevated BMT Jamaica Line.

At one point in the clock's lifetime, the words "Tad's Steaks" were added in neon, but these words were subsequently removed during a restoration. Several hundred sidewalk clocks had once existed in New York City, but only seven such clocks remained by the 1980s, including the Jamaica Avenue clock. The New York City Landmarks Preservation Commission designated all seven clocks as city landmarks in 1981. The Jamaica Avenue clock was also added to the National Register of Historic Places in 1985. The clock was restored and moved to its present location at 92-00a Union Hall Street in 1989.

By the 2020s, the clock had again fallen into disrepair; its head was dented and a panel in its pedestal had to be sealed using duct tape. Local activist Thomas Crater contacted politicians and city government agencies about issues with the clock. After nobody claimed ownership of the clock, the Jamaica Center Business Improvement District decided to restore it, receiving $30,000 in funding from the office of New York City councilman Daneek Miller and another $30,000 from the city government. Save America's Clocks and the Electric Time Company found that the clock closely resembled a Self-Winding Company design and decided to restore it. In 2021, the Electric Time Company restored the clock at its studio in Massachusetts. The clock was rededicated in December 2021.

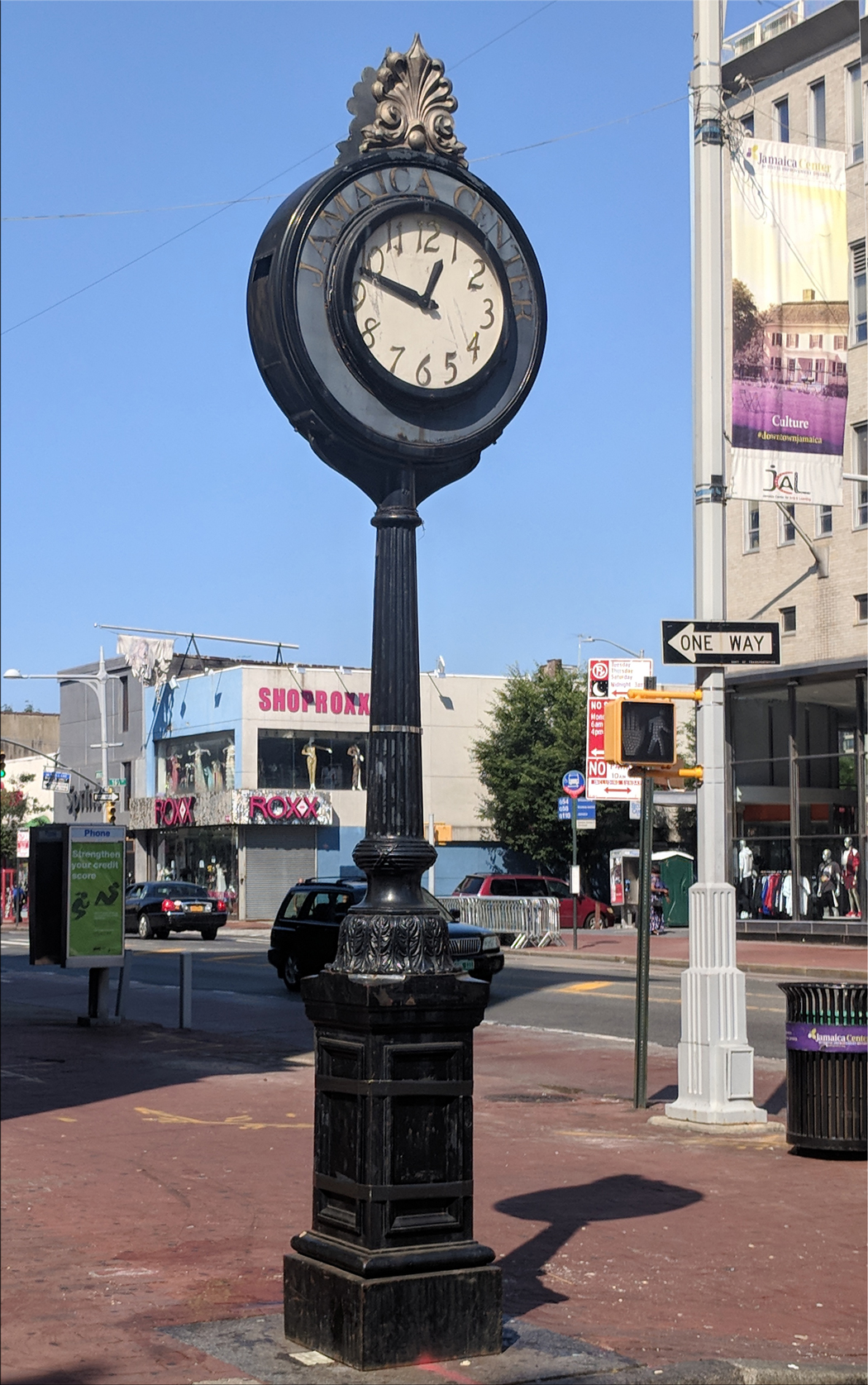
View from the sidewalk

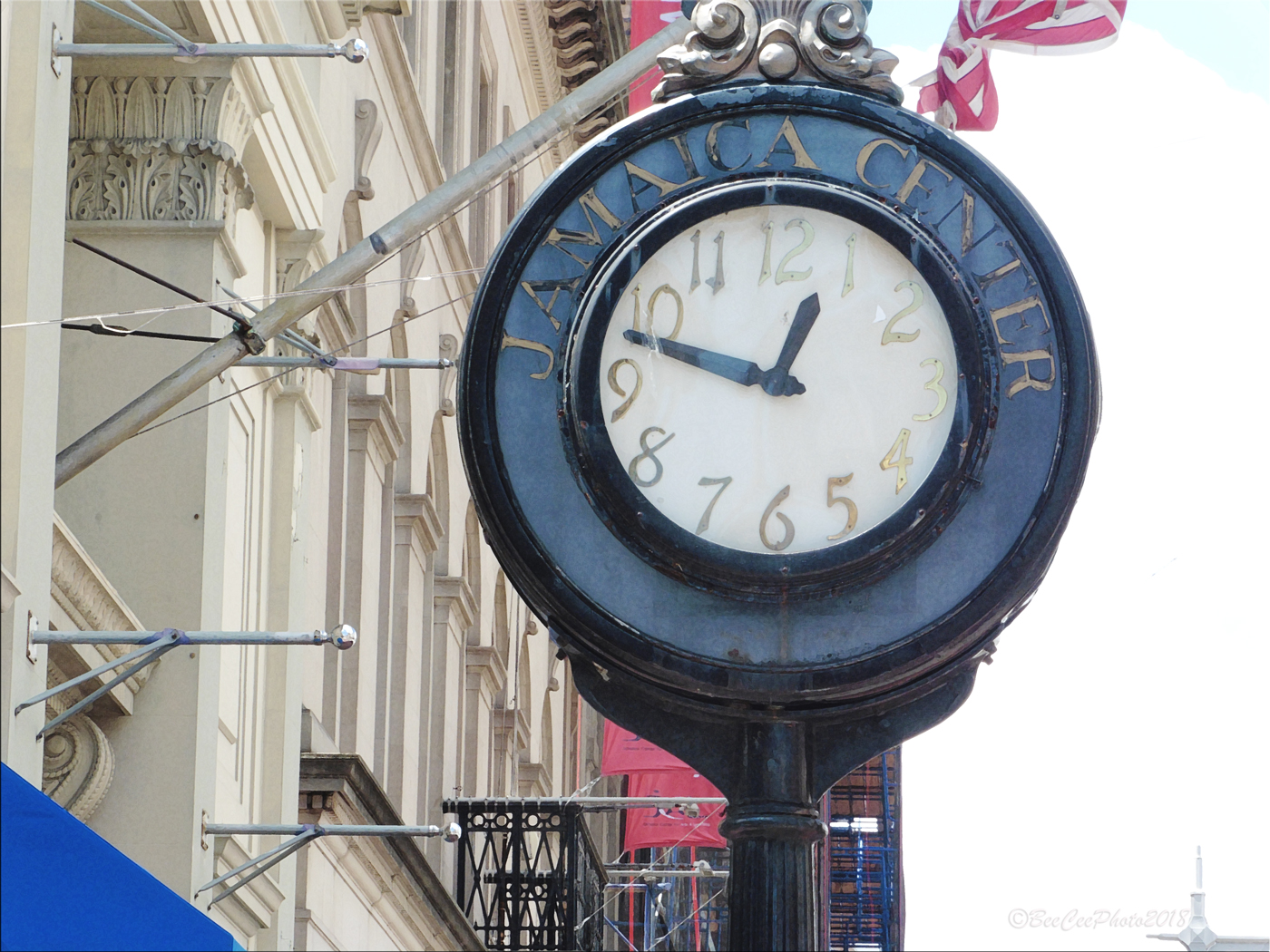
Detail of clock face

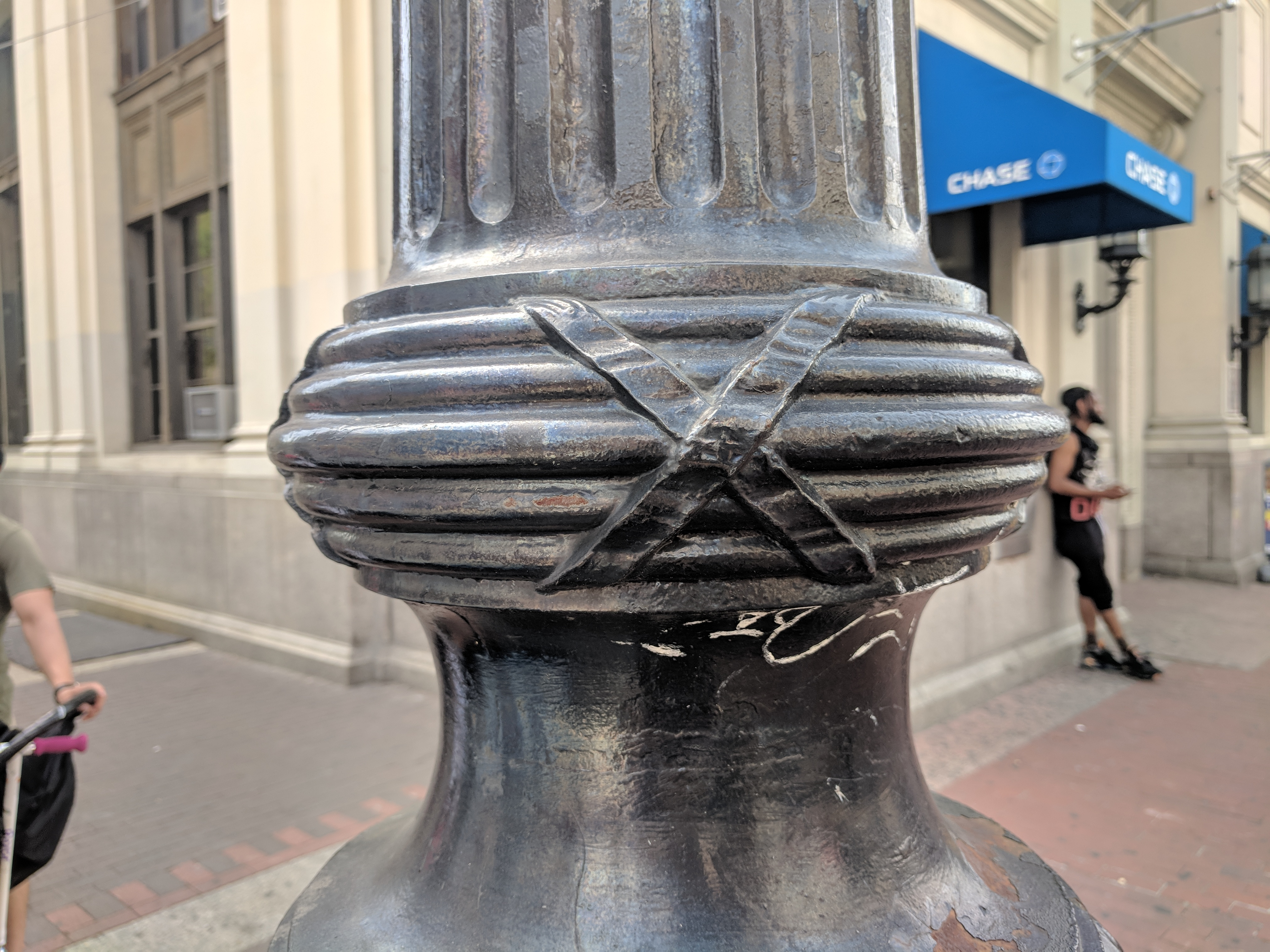
Detail of rings below fluted column
